= 1991 in comics =

Notable events of 1991 in comics.

== Events ==
=== Year overall ===
- Publishers Cartoon Books, Comic Zone Productions, Personality Comics, and Boneyard Press all enter the arena; First Comics stops publishing.
- Egmont UK bought Fleetway Publications. They merge it with London Editions to form Fleetway Editions.

=== January ===
- January 7: Big Nate debuts.
- The Indian comics magazine Target discontinues Ajit Ninan's detective comic Detective Moochhwala.
- Checkmate is canceled by DC Comics with issue #33.
- El Diablo vol. 2 is canceled by DC with issue #16.
- Count Duckula is canceled by the Marvel Comics imprint Star Comics with issue #15.
- Alien Legion: On The Edge is canceled with issue #3.
- Avengers Spotlight is cancelled with #40.
- Tuareg by Guido Nolitta and Roberto Diso (Mister No series; Bonelli).

=== February ===
- February 24: The final episode of Ralph Graczak's Our Own Oddities is published.
- The Amazing Spider-Man #344 - First appearance of Cletus Kasady, who later becomes the super-villain Carnage.
- Frank by Jim Woodring debuts in the second issue of Buzz.
- New Mutants #98 - Introduction of Deadpool, Domino, and Gideon. (Marvel Comics)
- Power Pack is canceled by Marvel with issue #62.
- Heathcliff is cancelled with issue #56.
- Gian Luigi Bonelli ends his run as comics author, more than fifty years long, with a Tex Willer’s adventure, Il medaglione spagnolo (designed by Guglielmo Letteri).

=== March ===
- "Weapon X" begins in Marvel Comics Presents.
- With #12, Stalkers is cancelled by Epic Comics.
- With #4, The Last American is cancelled by Epic Comics.

=== April ===
- New Mutants #100, the title's final issue, featuring the debut of X-Force (Marvel Comics).
- With #6 Cadillacs & Dinosaurs is cancelled.
- With #5, Hollywood Superstars is cancelled.
- First issue of Seth's Palookaville
- Nightcat a one-shot comic book published by Marvel featuring real-life singer Jacqueline Tavarez. Written by Barry Dutter and drawn by Denys Cowan and Jimmy Palmiotti. The cover art by Joe Jusko was also used on the compact disc and cassette tape release of Tavarez's music album.

=== May ===
- May 11: The British girls' comics magazine Mandy merges with Judy.
- W. B. Park receives the National Cartoonist Society Advertising and Illustration Award.
- Little Archie #1, relaunched as The New Little Archie that only ran for nine issues.

=== June ===
- June 15: In Turnhout, Belgium, a statue of Adhemar (from Marc Sleen's The Adventures of Nero) is revealed, made by Frank-Ivo Van Damme.
- The final issue of Françoise Mouly and Art Spiegelman's Raw is published.
- Armageddon 2001 crossover event.
- Agente speciale Alfa by Antonio Serra and Claudio Castellini, first album of the Nathan Never series (Bonelli).

=== July ===
- July 13: René Windig and Eddie de Jong (Heinz) receive the Stripschapprijs. The Jaarprijs voor Bijzondere Verdiensten (nowadays the P. Hans Frankfurtherprijs) goes to publishing company Big Balloon.
- In Brussels, Belgium, the first mural depicting a famous Belgian comics series (Frank Pé's Broussaille), is inaugurated. This launches the Brussels' Comic Book Route project.
- Superman: The Man of Steel #1 - debut issue of fourth ongoing Superman title. Written by Louise Simonson and drawn by Jon Bogdanove, Tom Grummett, Bob McLeod, Dan Jurgens, Dennis Janke, Jerry Ordway, and Brett Breeding.
- Wizard publishes its premiere issue.
- The Marvel Comics event "Muir Island Saga" begins.
- With #10, Mighty Mouse is cancelled.
- With #80, The Transformers is cancelled by Marvel Comics.
- With #25, Yummy Fur moves to Drawn & Quarterly
- La casa degli uomini perduti by Tiziano Sclavi and Giampiero Casertano (Dylan Dog series; Bonelli)

=== August ===
- New Gods vol. 3 is canceled by DC with issue #28.
- With #19, Cloak & Dagger is cancelled.

=== September ===
- Alpha Flight #100: "The Final Option, Part Four: Decisions of Trust," written by Fabian Nicieza.
- With #2, Impossible Man Summer Vacation Spectacular is cancelled.
- With #4, Car Warriors is cancelled.
- With #3, Samurai Cat is cancelled.
- With #4, Damage Control v3 is cancelled.
- Everything's Archie is canceled by Archie Comics with issue #157.

=== October ===
- In the Dutch monthly magazine Doen, Marnix Rueb's comic series Haagse Harry makes its debut. It will grow from a cult hit into a nationally popular phenomenon.
- Crisis is canceled by Fleetway with issue #63.
- With #2, Legion of Night is cancelled.
- With #3, Terminator 2: Judgment Day is cancelled.
- With #4, Alpha Flight Special is cancelled.
- With #6, Sweet XVI is cancelled.
- With #10, Foolkiller v1 is cancelled.

=== November ===
- November 21 – the Marathi comic strip Chintoo is first published.
- Alpha Flight #102: Introduction of Wild Child as Weapon Omega.
- Maze Agency is canceled by Innovation Comics with issue #23.
- With #12, Marvel Comics' Zorro is cancelled.
- Daniel Clowes' Art School Confidential is prepublished in Eightball.

=== December ===
- December 1: In the Italian Disney magazine Topolino, the first episode of the Mickey Mouse story Topolino e un favore da nulla, by Carlo Panaro and Corrado Mastantuono is published. It marks the debut of Pierino and Pieretto, the two nephews of Peg-Leg Pete.
- December 31: The final episode of Marten Toonder's Panda is published. Running for 45 years it was his longest-running series in syndication.
- The Incredible Hulk #388: Jim Wilson revealed to be HIV-positive.

=== Specific date unknown ===
- The final episode of Costa Rican artist Fernando Zeledón Guzmán's satirical comic strip La Semana en Serio in the communist magazine Adelante is published.
- Belgian comic artists Edouard Aidans, Guy Bara, François Craenhals, Bob De Moor, André-Paul Duchâteau, André Franquin, Fred & Liliane Funcken, Michel Greg, Raymond Macherot, Jacques Martin, Eddy Paape, Tibet and Albert Weinberg are all knighted in the Order of Leopold II.
- In the Greek newspapaer Eleftherotypia, debut of the strip Χαμηλές πτήσεις (Low flights) by Arkas.

== Deaths ==
=== January ===
- January 1: Dean Miller, American comics artist (Mighty O' Malley, continued Vic Flint), dies at age 52.
- January 5: John Lehti, American comics artist (Tommy of the Big Top), dies at age 78.
- January 16: Maurieta Wellman, American illustrator, painter and comics artist (Goofus and Gallant), dies at age 88.
- January 19: Giovanni Sinchetto, Italian comic artist (member of EsseGesse, co-creator of Captain Miki, Il Grande Blek, Comandante Mark, Kinowa and Alan Mistero), dies at age 68.
- January 24: J.H. Koeleman, jr., Dutch illustrator and comics artist (Pinkie Pienter, aka Ronny Roberts), dies at age 64.

=== February ===
- February 11: Michel Mahy, Belgian comics artist (De Spookjes, assisted on Bessy), dies at age 42.
- February 15: Hans Borrebach, Dutch comic artist, dies at age 87.
- February 16: Franco Bignotti, Italian comics artist (Il Piccolo Centauro, drew comics for Sergio Bonelli and Amalgamated Press), dies at age 60.
- February 19: Gradie Knipscheer, Dutch comics artist and musician (Keesje Konijntje), dies at age 76.

=== March ===
- March 15: Govindan Aravindan, Indian film director and comic artist (Cheriya Manushyarum Valiya Lokavum, Ramuvinte Sahasika Yathrakal, Guruji), dies at age 56.
- March 29: Sytze Henstra, Dutch illustrator, cartoonist and painter (sports cartoons for De Telegraaf), dies at age 96.

=== April ===
- April 4: Graham Ingels, American comics artist (EC Comics), dies at age 75 from stomach cancer.
- April 17: Jacques Armand, French comics artist (Gérard Lambert, Black-Out, Ric Brio, Le Corporal Rouge, Le Roi Vert), dies at age 33.
- April 19:
  - Frederik Bramming, Danish animator and comics artist (Frederik, Chas, Motorskatten), dies at age 79.
  - Charles Popineau, French comic artist and illustrator (worked on Le Crime Ne Paie Pas and Les Amours Célèbres), dies at age 65.

=== May ===
- May 1: Adolfo Samper, Colombian comics artist (Mojicón, La Hermana de Mojicón, Los Filipicines, Godofredo Cascarrabias, Don Amancise), dies at age 91.
- May 6: Guido Martina, Italian comics writer (L'Inferno di Topolino), dies at age 85.
- May 8: Kathleen O'Brien, Australian comics artist (Wanda the War Girl), dies at age 76.
- May 10: Adolfo Aizen, Brazilian journalist and comic publisher, dies at age 83.
- May 14: Joy Batchelor, British animator and film director (Halas & Batchelor), dies at age 77.
- May 20: Milko Bambič, Slovene illustrator, painter, novelist and comics artist (Zamorček Bu-ci-bu, in English best known as Little Negro Bu-ci-bu), dies at age 86.
- May 27: Ed Dodd, American comics artist (Mark Trail), dies at age 88.
- May 29:
  - Hans Brouwer, aka Ipse, Dutch comics artist (Fed en Vetertje), dies at age 74.
  - Harry Haenigsen, American comics artist (Simeon Batts, Our Bill, Penny), dies at age 90.
- May 31: Paul Campani, Italian comic artist (Mister X, Gey Carioca, Tita Dinamita, Bull Rocket, worked on Asso di Picche), dies at age 67.

=== June ===
- June 3: Vince Colletta, Italian-American comics artist and inker (drew many romance comics and worked for Marvel Comics and DC Comics), dies at age 67.
- June 6: Gianni De Luca, Italian comics artist (Commissario Spada), dies at age 64.
- June 10: Jean Bruller, aka Vercors, French novelist, illustrator and comics artist (Le Mariage de Monsieur Lakonik), dies at age 89.
- June 10: Milorad Dobrić, Yugoslavian (Serbian) comics artist (Pera Pesak, Ljuba Truba, Kurir Fica, Slavuj Gilsa, Inspektor Zuca), dies at age 66.
- June 27: Virginia Huget, American comics artist (Gentlemen Prefer Blondes, Babs in Society, Campus Capers, Miss Aladdin, Molly the Manicure Girl, continued Skippy and Oh Diana!), dies at age 91.

=== July ===
- July 4:
  - Fernand Cheneval, Swiss-Belgian comics artist and publisher (founder of the magazine Heroïc Albums), dies at age 73.
  - Art Sansom, American comics artist (The Born Loser), dies at age 70.
- July 6: Nicholas P. Dallis, American comics writer (Rex Morgan, M.D., Judge Parker, Apartment 3-G), dies at age 89.
- July 9: Petr Sadecký, Czech comics artist (Octobriana), dies.
- July 11: Paul McCarthy, American comics artist (Gertie O'Grady), Silly-Ettes, drew Sad Sack, Fun At The Zoo and Holly of Hollywood), dies at age 81.
- July 18: Robert B. Leffingwell, American comics artist (assisted on Little Orphan Annie, continued Little Joe), dies at age 80.
- July 31: Jess Benton, American comics artist (Jasper Jooks), dies at age 90.

=== August ===
- August 10: Jerzy Wroblewski, Polish comic artist (Risk, Underground Front, Captain Zbik), dies at age 50.
- August 18: Rick Griffin, American underground comix artist (Flying Eyeball, Murphy, Man From Utopia) dies at age 47 in a motorcycle accident.
- August 24: Reynold Brown, American poster designer and comics artist (continued Tailspin Tommy), dies at age 73.
- Specific date in August unknown: James De Carlo, American comic artist (Archie Comics), dies at age 43.

=== September ===
- September 4: Bing Coughlin, Canadian advertising illustrator and comics artist (Herbie), dies at age 86.
- September 5: Carol Kalish, American comics publisher and vice President of New Product Development at Marvel Comics, dies at age 36 from a brain aneurysm.
- September 13: Edmond Good, Canadian illustrator and comics artist (Rex Baxter, Johnny Law, Sky Ranger, assisted on Scorchy Smith, Bruce Gentry - Daredevil of the Skies, Casey Ruggles and Dixie Dugan), dies at age 81.
- September 18: Vinicio Berti, Italian painter and comics artist (Atomino, Chiodino, Ciondolino, Gian Burrasca), dies at age 70.
- September 24:
  - Dom Orejudos, American illustrator and comics artist (Meatman, Startrick), dies at age 58 from AIDS.
  - Dr. Seuss, American children's novelist, illustrator, animator and comics artist (Hejji), dies at age 87.

=== October ===
- October 2: George Vakalo, Greek painter, set designer, costume maker, writer and comic artist, dies at age 86 or 87 .
- October 16: Henricus Kannegieter, Dutch illustrator and comics artist (made various one-shot comics in the 1930s), dies at age 93.
- October 23: Antonio Canale, Italian comics artist (Amok), dies at age 76.

=== November ===
- November 7: Tom of Finland, Finnish comics artist and illustrator, dies at age 71.
- November 11:
  - Franziska Bilek, German comics artist and illustrator (worked for Simplicissimus), dies at age 85.
  - Mikhail Kupriyanov, Russian painter, illustrator and poster designer (member of the collective Kukryniksy), dies at age 88.
- November 18: Reg Parlett, British comics artist (Ivor Lott and Tony Broke, Mustapha Million), dies at age 87.
- Specific date unknown: Neville Colvin, British comics artist (Ginger & Co., comic strip based on James Bond, continued Modesty Blaise), dies at age 72.

=== December ===
- December 3: Alex Graham, Scottish comics artist (Fred Basset), dies at age 78.
- December 21: Sheldon Mayer, American comics artist (J. Worthington Blimp, The Strange Adventures of Mr. Weed, Scribbly, Sugar and Spike, ghosted Bobby Thatcher, Mutt & Jeff), dies at age 74.
- December 29: Tony Strobl, American animator and comics artist (Disney comics, Looney Tunes comics, Hanna-Barbera comics), dies at age 76.

=== Specific date unknown ===
- Albert Edgard Beard, British comics artist and illustrator (The Gaisby Knights), dies at age 88 or 89.
- Gordon Boshell, British novelist, journalist and comics writer (Garth), dies at age 81 or 82.
- Jaap Lamberton, Dutch illustrator and comics artist (worked on Panda), dies at age 45.
- Charles Popineau, French illustrator and comics artist (worked on the Le Crime ne Paie Pas and Les Amours Célèbres series), dies at age 65 or 66.
- Alberto Romero, Argentine comics artist (Roberto, un as del Deporte, continued El Vengador), dies at age 75 or 76.
- Eugen Taru, Romanian illustrator, caricaturist and comics artist ('Barbăcot), dies at age 78.

== Conventions ==
- April 27–28: WonderCon (Oakland Convention Center, Oakland, California) — guests include Kevin Eastman, Mark Bodé, Miguel Ferrer, Bill Mumy, Steve Leialoha, and Max Allan Collins
- June: Heroes Convention (Charlotte, North Carolina)
- June 21–23: Comix Fair (Holiday Inn-Medical Center, Houston, Texas) — ninth annual convention; guests include Russ Heath, Nestor Redondo, Jeff Millar, Bill Hinds, and Richard Klaw
- June 21–23: Chicago Comicon (Ramada O'Hare, Rosemont, Illinois) — guests include Jim Steranko, Kevin Eastman, and Chris Claremont
- July: Tri-State Con (New York City) — guests include Michael Avon Oeming, Evan Dorkin, Nat Gertler, Romeo Tanghal, Paul Ryan, Bob Wiacek, and Mike Manley
- July 4–7: San Diego Comic-Con (San Diego Convention Center and Pan Pacific Hotel, San Diego, California): 15,000+ attendees; official guests: Clive Barker, Dan DeCarlo, Harlan Ellison, Neil Gaiman, Keith Giffen, Joe Haldeman, Lynn Johnston, Joe Kubert, Jim Lee, Don Maitz, Sheldon Moldoff, Rick Sternbach, and Janny Wurts
- July 12–14: Dragon Con/Atlanta Comics Expo (Atlanta Hilton & Towers, Atlanta, Georgia) — 5,200 attendees; guests include Philip José Farmer and Frank Miller
- July 19–21: Dallas Fantasy Fair (Dallas, Texas) — presentation of the Harvey Awards
- July 26–28: Atlanta Fantasy Fair (Atlanta Hilton & Towers, Atlanta, Georgia) — official guests include Marina Sirtis, Dean Stockwell, Marc Singer, Matt Wagner, Julius Schwartz, Greg Bear
- September 21–22: Miamicon (Ft. Lauderdale Design Center Sheraton Hotel, Ft. Lauderdale, Florida; and Miami Marriott, Miami, Florida) — guests include Chris Warner, Evan Dorkin, Bob Schreck, and Matt Wagner
- November: Mid-Ohio Con (Ohio)

== First issues by title ==
=== DC Comics ===
- Deathstroke the Terminator
- Superman: The Man of Steel

==== Limited series ====
- Black Canary

Release: November.

=== Dark Horse Comics ===
- Star Wars: Dark Empire

=== Marvel Comics ===
- Barbie

Release: January

- Barbie Fashion

Release: January.

- Bill & Ted's Excellent Comic Book

Release: December.

- Captain Planet and the Planeteers

Release: October.

- Darkhawk

Release: March.

- Deathlok v2

Release: July.

- The Destroyer v3

Release: December.

- Double Dragon

Release: July.

- Original Ghost Rider Rides Again

Release: July.

- NFL SuperPro

Release: October.

- Sleepwalker

Release: June.

- Sweet XVI

Release: May.

- The Toxic Avenger

Release: April.

- Wonder Man

Release: September.

- X-Force v1

Release: August.

- X-Men v2

Release: October.

==== Limited series ====
- Adventures of Captain America

Release: September.

- Alpha Flight Special

Release: July.

- Captain Confederacy

Release: November by Epic Comics.

- Car Warriors

Release: June by Epic Comics.

- Damage Control

Release: June.

- Deadly Foes of Spider-Man

Release: May.

- Deathlok Special (reprint of Deathlok v1)

Release: May.

- The Infinity Gauntlet

Release: July.

- Legion of Night

Release: September.

- The Pirates of Dark Water

Release: November.

- Samurai Cat

Release: June by Epic Comics.

- Spider-Man Saga

Release: November.

- Terminator 2: Judgment Day

Release: September.

- The Transmutation of Ike Garuda

Release: July by Epic Comics.

- Weaveworld

Release: December by Epic Comics.

=== Independent ===
- Bone

Release: July by Cartoon Books

- Dirty Plotte

Release: January by Drawn & Quarterly

- Palookaville

Release: April by Drawn & Quarterly

- Rubber Blanket

Release: by Rubber Blanket Press

== Initial appearance by character name ==
=== DC Comics ===
- Abattoir in Detective Comics #625
- Alexandre LeRoi in Batman: Master of the Future
- Atomic Skull in Adventures of Superman #483
- Bloody Mary in Hawk and Dove vol. 2 #21 (February)
- Donna Cavanaugh in The Sandman #32 (November)
- Chantinelle in Hellblazer #43 (July)
- Destruction of the Endless in The Sandman Special #1 (November)
- Electrocutioner in Detective Comics #626 (February)
- General Glory in Justice League America # 46 (January)
- King Snake in Robin #2 (February)
- Linear Men in Adventures of Superman #476 (March)
- Lynx in Robin v1 #1 (January)
- Mirage in The New Titans #79
- Monarch in Armageddon 2001 #2 (October)
- Nightrider in New Titans Annual #7
- Pantha in New Titans #73 (February)
- Speed Queen in Hawk and Dove vol. 2 #21 (February)
- Terra in New Titans #79 (September)
- Ron Troupe in Adventures of Superman #480 (July)
- Malice Vundabar in Hawk and Dove vol. 2 #21 (February)
- Waverider in Armageddon 2001 #1 (May)
- Paul Westfield in Superman Vol. 2, #58 (August)

=== Marvel Comics ===
- 8-Ball in Sleepwalker #1 (June)
- Helmut in The Incredible Hulk #379 (March)
- Bishop in Uncanny X-Men #282 (November)
- G. W. Bridge in X-Force #1 (August)
- Copycat in New Mutants #98 (February)
- Abraham Cornelius in Marvel Comics Presents #73 (March)
- Fabian Cortez in X-Men vol. 2, #1 (October)
- Cyber in Marvel Comics Presents #85 (September)
- Darkhawk in Darkhawk #1 (March)
- Deadpool in The New Mutants #98 (February)
- Devos the Devastator in Fantastic Four #359 (December)
- Marco Delgado in X-Men v. 2, #1 (October)
- Wyndell Dichinson in Web of Spider-Man #81 (October)
- Feral in New Mutants vol. 1, #99 (March)
- Firebrand in Web of Spider-Man vol. 1, #77 (June)
- Trevor Fitzroy in Uncanny X-Men #281 (October)
- Gauntlet in X-Factor #65 (April)
- Gideon in New Mutants #98 (February)
- Impala in Captain America #388 (July)
- Krugarr in Guardians of the Galaxy Annual #1
- Lodestone in Darkhawk #7 (September)
- Fabian Marechal-Julbin in New Warriors #9 (March)
- Nox in Doctor Strange, Sorcerer Supreme #31 (July)
- Paibok in Fantastic Four Vol. 1, #358 (November)
- Phobos in Dr. Strange, Sorcerer Supreme #32 (August)
- Phoenix (Giraud) in Guardians of the Galaxy #11 (April)
- Protégé in Guardians of the Galaxy #15 (August)
- Psynapse in X-Factor #65 (April)
- Rancor in Guardians of the Galaxy #8 (January)
- Replica in Guardians of the Galaxy #9 (February)
- Shatterstar in New Mutants vol. 1, #99 (March)
- Shinobi Shaw in X-Factor #67 (June)
- Sleepwalker in Sleepwalker #1
- Speedfreek in The Incredible Hulk #388 (December)
- Squirrel Girl in Marvel Super-Heroes Special vol. 2, #8 (Winter)
- Jeremy Stevens in Uncanny X-Men #283 (December)
- Carl Stricklan in Daredevil Annual #9
- Talon in Guardians of the Galaxy #18 (November)
- Tusk in X-Factor #65 (April)
- Nathan Taylor in The Incredible Hulk #379 (December)
- Weapon X in X-Force v. 1, #2 (September)
- Buford Wilson in New Warriors vol. 1, #9 (March)
- John Wraith in Wolverine (vol. 2) #48 (November)
- Zodiak in Ghost Rider Vol. 3, #10 (February)

=== Other publishers ===
- Detective-Judge Armitage in Judge Dredd Megazine v.1, #9 (Fleetway, June)
- Lady Death in Evil Ernie #1 (Chaos! Comics, December)
- Erica Pierce in Solar, Man of the Atom v. 2, #1 (Valiant Comics, September)
