= Reilly Brown =

American comic book artist and writer

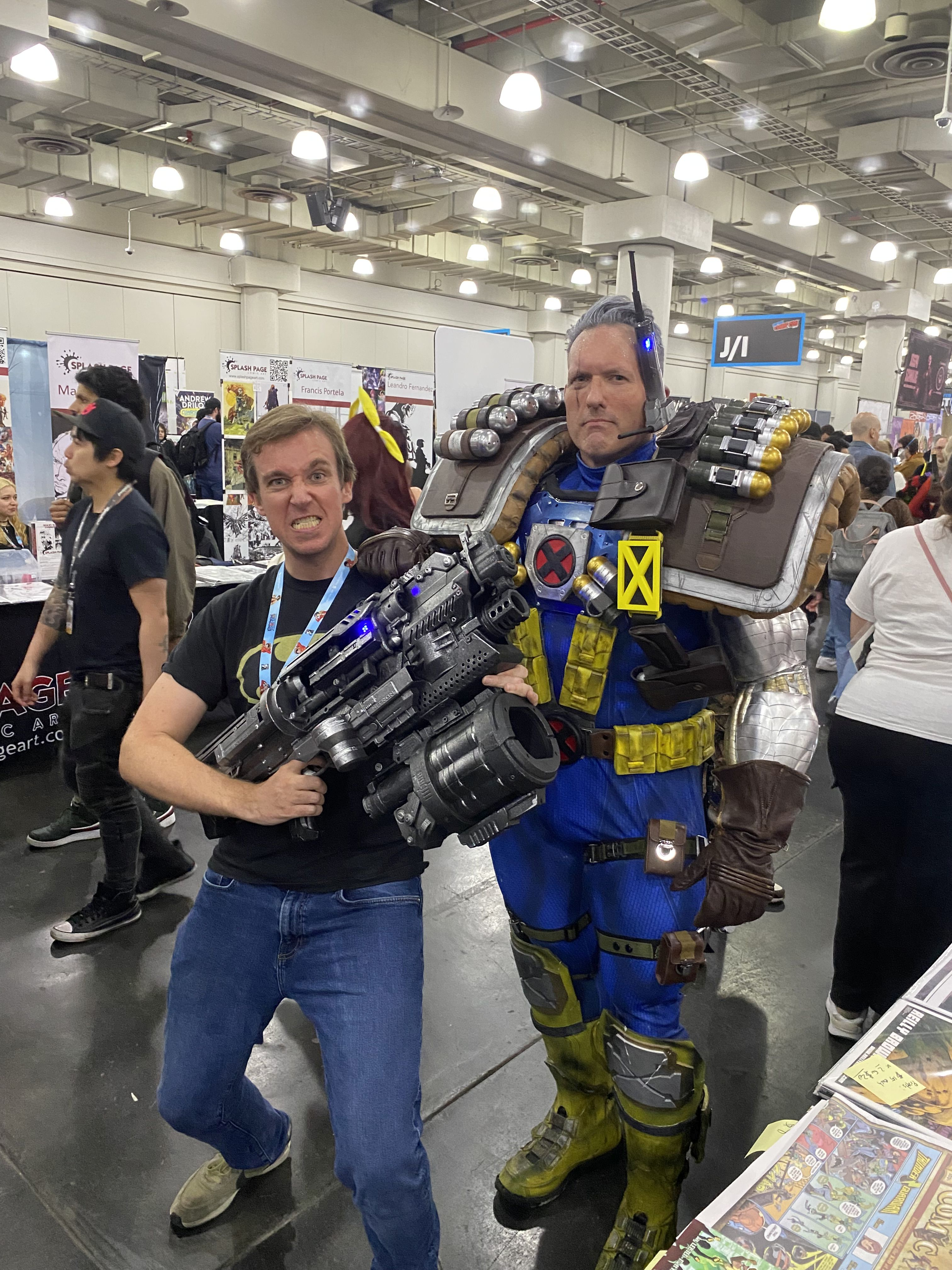
Reilly Brown on Day 1 of the 2014 New York Comic Con

Reilly Brown (born August 5, 1981) is an American comic book artist and writer. Following his graduation from Virginia Commonwealth University in 2003, he has drawn various comics for Marvel Comics including The Amazing Spider-Man, New Warriors, and Incredible Hercules, as well as the digital comic AvX. He's mostly known for his work as an artist and writer on Cable & Deadpool and Deadpool: Dracula's Gauntlet, in which Brown co-created the characters Bob, Agent of Hydra and Shiklah. He also co-created the digital comic Power Play with writer Kurt Christenson in 2011 and drew Saint George for Dark Horse Comics in 2013. In 2015 Brown pencilled Lobo for DC Comics as part of the company's New 52 branding. From 2018 to 2022, he drew the WEBTOON series Outrage with Fabian Nicieza.

Brown co-founded Ten Ton Studios with several other comic book artists in 2004 and Hypothetical Island Studios in 2010. He is on the staff of the Comics Experience.
