= Super Pro =

Super Pro or variant, may refer to:

- Hammarlund Super Pro (radioset), the "Super Pro", a radio receiver made by Hammarlund
- Randy Rose (born 1956) pro wrestler with the ring name "Super Pro"
- NFL SuperPro (comic book), a comic book published by Marvel Comics starring the eponymous character
  - NFL SuperPro (character), a comic book character featured on the eponymous Marvel Comics comic book NFL SuperPro
- Super Pro (class), a driver classification in British Drift Championship
- Super Pro (class), a driver classification in drag racing
- McCulloch Super Pro (chainsaw), a chainsaw model line built by McCulloch Motors Corporation
- Ricochet Super Pro (MT-4A), a home videogame console made by Ricochet Electronics, see List of first generation home video game consoles

== See also ==
- Super-Pro Wrestling, a wrestling tour, see List of professional wrestling promoters in the United States
- Super (disambiguation)
- Pro (disambiguation)
