= Deadpool (comic book) =

Marvel comic book first published in 1997

- Deadpool and Siryn, by Karl Kerschl; Deadpool issue #56 (Series 3)

Publication information
- Schedule: Monthly
- Format: (The Circle Chase, vol. 1 & 2) Limited series (vol. 3–9) Ongoing
- Publication date: August 1993 – October 2023
- No. of issues: List: Deadpool: The Circle Chase : 4; Deadpool: Sins of the Past: 4; Vol. 1: 69; Vol. 2: 63; Vol. 3: 45; Vol. 4: 36; Vol. 5: 14; Vol. 6: 15; Vol. 7: 10; Vol. 8: 10; Vol. 9: 15
- Main character(s): Wade Wilson / Deadpool; Ellie Camacho / Deadpool

Creative team
- Written by: List: (The Circle Chase) Fabian Nicieza (Sins of the Past) Mark Waid (vol. 1) Joe Kelly (−1, 0, 1–33, Annual #1997–1998), Christopher Priest (34–45) (Vol. 2) Daniel Way (Vol. 3) Brian Posehn & Gerry Duggan (Vol. 4) Gerry Duggan (Despicable Deadpool) Gerry Duggan (Vol. 6) Skottie Young (Absolute Carnage vs. Deadpool) Frank Tieri (Vol. 7) Kelly Thompson (Vol. 8) Alyssa Wong (Vol. 9) Cody Ziglar

Deadpool is the name of multiple comic book titles featuring the character Deadpool and published by Marvel Comics, beginning with the original Deadpool comic book series which debuted in 1997. The first eight volumes follow Wade Wilson as the original Deadpool, while the ninth volume follows Wilson training his daughter Ellie Camacho as a new Deadpool.

== Publication history ==
=== Volume 1 ===
In 1997, Deadpool was given his own ongoing title, initially written by Joe Kelly, with then-newcomer Ed McGuinness as an artist. Deadpool became an action comedy parody of the cosmic drama, antihero-heavy comics of the time. The series firmly established his supporting cast, including his prisoner/den mother Blind Al and his best friend Weasel. The ongoing series gained cult popularity for its unorthodox main character and its balance of angst and pop culture slapstick and the character became less of a villain, though the element of his moral ambiguity remained. Kelly noted, "With Deadpool, we could do anything we wanted because everybody just expected the book to be cancelled every five seconds, so nobody was paying attention. And we could get away with it." Reportedly, Kelly introduced the comic's fourth wall breaking gimmick.

The series was taken over by Christopher Priest who noted that he found Kelly's issues to be "complex and a little hostile to new readers like me" and by issue 37, he realized that "it was okay to make Deadpool look stupid." Kelly may have introduced Deadpool to breaking the fourth wall, but Priest "could be credited for establishing it as an essential part of the character's personality and worldview." Priest left the series after only one year at issue #45.

For a time, writers who followed generally ignored the fourth wall entirely, until Gail Simone took over with issue #65. Her version is remembered for the frequent use of the "little yellow boxes." Deadpool lasted until issue #69, at which point it was relaunched as a new title by Simone with a similar character called Agent X in 2002. This occurred during a line wide revamp of X-Men related comics, with Cable becoming Soldier X and X-Force becoming X-Statix. Simone notes that 'When I took the Deadpool job, the revamp hadn't been planned, so it was a complete surprise. Thankfully, we heard about it in time to make adjustments to the early scripts'. It appeared that Deadpool was killed in an explosion fighting the supervillain Black Swan. Deadpool's manager, Sandi Brandenberg later founded Agency X with a mysterious man called Alex Hayden, who took the name dubbed Agent X. Deadpool later returned to the series. Simone left the title after seven issues due to creative differences with the series editor, but then returned to conclude with issues 13–15.

=== Volume 2 ===
Deadpool

Publication information
- Publisher: Marvel Comics
- Schedule: Monthly
- Format: Ongoing series
- Publication date: September 2008 – October 2012
- No. of issues: 63 (+ 1 Annual, 2 #.1 issues (#33.1-49.1))
- Main character: Deadpool

Creative team
- Written by: Daniel Way

A new Deadpool ongoing series written by Daniel Way with artist Paco Medina began as a Secret Invasion tie-in. In the first arc, the character is seen working with Nick Fury to steal data on how to kill the Skrull queen Veranke. Norman Osborn steals the information that Deadpool had stolen from the Skrulls, and subsequent stories deal with the fallout from that. Writer Daniel Way explained, "the first thing Osborn does to try and take care of the situation is to bring in a hired gun to take Deadpool down, which would be Tiger-Shark. That would be the standard thing to do, but of course everything about Deadpool is non-standard. So it goes completely awry and Norman has to get more serious about things." The story also sees the return of Bob, Agent of Hydra, "I don't want the book to become 'Deadpool and Friends' so characters will drift in and out, but Bob was someone I definitely wanted to bring in. It just had to be at the perfect moment and when I was putting this storyline together that moment presented itself." This all led directly to a confrontation with the new Thunderbolts in "Magnum Opus" which crossed over between Deadpool vol. 2 #8–9 and Thunderbolts #130–131. Thunderbolts writer Andy Diggle said, "it's a natural progression for Deadpool to go after Norman, and for Norman to send his personal hit-squad after Deadpool." In Deadpool #15, Deadpool decides to become a hero resulting in conflicts with proper heroes like Spider-Man (who he had recently encountered in The Amazing Spider-Man #611 as part of "The Gauntlet") and leading to a 3-issue arc where he takes on Hit-Monkey, a character who debuted in the same month in a digital, then print, one-shot.

A special anniversary issue titled Deadpool #900 was released in October 2009. It features stories written by several authors, with the main feature written by the original Deadpool series writer Joe Kelly and drawn by Deadpool's creator Rob Liefeld.

==== Story Arcs ====
===== "One of Us" (#1-3) =====
- Published: September 2008 - October 2008
- Plot Outline: The Merc with a Mouth is back, even deadlier and more deranged than before! The planet has been invaded by Skrulls, everything's gone topsy-turvy...but, in Deadpool's world, that just means it's Monday! Crazy times call for crazy men, but c'mon, this guy's insane! Like it or not, Deadpool may be the only person on the planet who can save us...but who's to say he wants to?

===== "Horror Business" (#4-5) =====
- Published: November 2008 - December 2008
- Plot Outline: His mission in "Secret Invasion" completed, Deadpool goes back to business as usual, completely unaware that he's been sold up the river by a villain of incalculable guile—a villain who won't soon forget—or forgive—Wade's sins. As the Skrull War winds to its climactic conclusion, the Merc with a Mouth has no idea that the worst for him is yet ahead.

===== "How Low Can You Go?" (#6-7) =====
- Published: January 2009 - February 2009
- Plot Outline: Remember when Deadpool saved the Earth from those pesky Skrulls? Well, the guy who stole the intel Deadpool worked so hard to acquire - and positioned himself as Earth's Number One War Hero - wants to make sure you don't. The last thing this guy needs is a certain "Merc with a Mouth" letting everyone know the truth of how he saved the day, and he's hired a certain maniacal man-eater to make sure Deadpool never does. Here comes Tiger-Shark! Plus, a surprise appearance by a certain palindromic pal!

===== "Magnum Opus" (#8-9) =====
- Published: March 2009 - April 2009
- Plot Outline: SPECIAL CROSSOVER WITH THUNDERBOLTS! Deadpool unleashes his most insane plan yet: a full-on assault against Norman Osborn! As Deadpool storms his way to the top of Avengers Tower, Osborn is forced to pull out all the stops to save his own skin—and that means deploying the brand new Thunderbolts! Plug your ears, kids—this is gonna be loud!

===== "Bullseye" (#10-12) =====
- Published: May 2009 - July 2009
- Plot Outline: Norman Osborn is through playing around with Deadpool—it's time to send in the big guns. The big, crazy guns that never, ever miss. He may be wearing a new costume, but he's still the same ol' psychopath...

===== "Wave of Mutilation" (#13-14) =====
- Published: August 2009
- Plot Outline: Deadpool has ceased to exist, he's given his good-byes, he's driven his car into the ocean. They'll think he's dead, but he'll sail away. Then, he becomes a pirate!

===== "Want You to Want Me" (#15-18) =====
- Published: September 2009 - December 2009
- Plot Outline: Now that he knows that a pirate's life isn't for him, Deadpool's now starting to seriously question this whole "mercenary" thing. Maybe there's something else he could do with his life. He doesn't know what that could be, but then he turns on the television, and he knows exactly where he needs to be, and who needs him most. Hello, San Francisco!

===== "Whatever a Spider Can" (#19-21) =====
- Published: January 2010 - March 2010
- Plot Outline: The X-Men? Pfft! Not really Deadpool's style. Though he's still committed to doing this "hero" thing, Wade's more of a "lone wolf" kinda guy, out there doing his own thing. Y'know…thwp-thwp.

===== "Do Idiots Dream of Electric Stupidity?" (#22) =====
- Published: April 2010
- Plot Outline: Somewhere in rural North Georgia, a brazen band of brigands have made the mistake of robbing Deadpool's bus, stagecoach-style. But en route to delivering a hefty comeuppance to these redneck rogues, Deadpool makes a "shocking" discovery…as will you, intrepid reader. Brace yourself for the introduction of Appalachia's own vilest of villains, the disgraceful WHITE LIGHTNIN'!

===== "Tricky" (#23-25) =====
- Published: May 2010 - July 2010
- Plot Outline: Deadpool's been described as many things over the years, but "trendsetter"? That's a new one. Here he is, trying to get his hero on and guess what? Suddenly, everyone else is, too! Seems like everyone's wanting to jump on the Deadpool bandwagon lately, doesn't it?

===== "Sinner Sinner, Chicken Dinner" (#26) =====
- Published: August 2010
- Plot Outline: Deadpool's quest to become a hero isn't exactly going well, mostly because…well, let's face it: Deadpool's just not a "good guy." He's done a lot of really bad stuff in the past, things that can't just be swept under the rug. But what if he was given the chance to do just that? What if he was given the chance to confront all of his past sins? What if Ghost Rider showed up in this book?

===== "I'm Your Man" (#27-29) =====
- Published: September 2010 - November 2010
- Plot Outline: This may be the Heroic Age and all, but the sad fact is that sometimes the good guys, in order to do good, have to do some things that are very bad. And when they do, well…that's when they hollah atcha boy.

===== "I Rule, You Suck" (#30-31) =====
- Published: December 2010 - January 2011
- Plot Outline: Deadpool blowing away vampires—how @#$%ing cool is that?! Wait…he's not blowing away vampires? He's protecting vampires? That doesn't sound cool at all.

===== "Send in the Clowns" (#32) =====
- Published: January 2011
- Plot Outline: Did you hear? Deadpool‘s done, outta the merc game. But there's a new player in town, and this cat is baaaad. He's got crazy space-guns, an intergalactic hooptie, and a rep that's getting bigger by the day and just about the coolest name ever. And he's here on earth to let everybody know…starting with Deadpool!

===== "The Price Is Right" (#33.1) =====
- Published: March 2011
- Plot Outline: Deadpool has risen to prominence, thanks to the immense talent of Daniel Way. And if you haven't been reading Deadpool, now is the time to delve into the Merc With A Mouth's twisted world! The Wrecker, an immensely powerful psychopath, is on the loose and wreaking havoc. There's only one person to call…Deadpool!

===== "Space Oddity" (#33-35) =====
- Published: February 2011 - April 2011
- Plot Outline: Deadpool, everyone's favorite fun-loving killer-for-hire, is back in business, taking on a new gig – in space! Will this job cement his rep as the best merc in the solar system, or will things like lack of oxygen and zero-gravity throw him off his game? One word: Maybe!

===== "Homecoming!" (#36) =====
- Published: April 2011
- Plot Outline: He's baa-aaack! No, not Deadpool (though he is back, from outer space)--Macho Gomez! And this time, he's brought friends. His friends? Nope...Deadpool's friends. And every single one of them has an axe to grind with our boy Wade for how he's treated them in the past. No, really—they have axes!

===== "In Between Worlds" (Annual #1) =====
- Published: May 2011
- Plot Outline: Deadpool teams up with Deadpool (well…Deathwish) in this alternate reality doppelganger extravaganza! The trip to a perfect world continues here from last month's Spider-Man Annual and features occasional attempts at serious subplot storytelling with guest stars Spider-Man and Hulk. But nothing is as it seems and all will be revealed!

===== "Operation Annihilation" (#37-39) =====
- Published: May 2011 - June 2011
- Plot Outline: The end begins here! Deadpool has now fixated on achieving the one thing that's always been beyond his reach—death. Not an easy thing for an un-killable man to achieve, but that's not gonna stop him from trying. But first, he must figure out the all-important question: How? What in the world can kill Deadpool? It has to be big. It has to be powerful beyond description. It has to be…green?

===== "Institutionalized" (#40-42) =====
- Published: July 2011 - August 2011
- Plot Outline: After the fallout (nuclear and otherwise) of Deadpool's antics out in Arizona, the federal government is faced with an impossible question: What to do with Deadpool? Luckily, Deadpool's gamma-powered legal defense team provides an answer: Stick him in an institution! When you think about it, it might be the only solution—after all he really does need some professional help as well as protection from the enemy; himself.

===== "You Complete Me" (#43-44) =====
- Published: September 2011 - October 2011
- Plot Outline: After a brief stint in a maximum-security mental institution, Deadpool is back on the streets and back on track, running headlong toward oblivion as fast as his little red feet can take him. But something causes him to stumble…or, rather, someone. Guess what, True Believers? Deadpool's about to get a girlfriend! Unfortunately, she's a total psychopath and Deadpool finds her utterly repulsive—but that's not gonna stop her! Actually, nothing can stop her. Prepare yourselves for the most disturbing love story ever told!

===== "Evil Deadpool" (#45-49) =====
- Published: October 2011 - January 2012
- Plot Outline: What would happen if a collection of Deadpool's frozen, severed body parts saved by Dr. Ella Whitby were to be thrown into a dumpster and then, once thawed, fuse together to form a new—and totally evil—Deadpool? Well, we could tell you…but it'd be way cooler if you read it for yourself!

===== "Deadpool: The Musical" (#49.1) =====
- Published: January 2012
- Plot Outline: Deadpool is about to be DEAD. Jump onboard readers, just as we kill our titular hero Deadpool!

===== "DEAD" (#50-54) =====
- Published: February 2012 - May 2012
- Plot Outline: Has everyone's favorite Merc With A Mouth finally made an appointment with Lady Death? Deadpool's lease on life is about to expire and those around him are going to feel the consequences including X-Force! See Wade Wilson make a monumental decision that will forever change who he is.

===== "Deadpool: Reborn" (#55-57) =====
- Published: May 2012 - July 2012
- Plot Outline: Deadpool survived the "Dead" storyline but he's now the same person he was. He might feel more alive than ever but that could end up biting him in the butt.

===== "Blacklisted!" (#58-#60) =====
- Published: July 2012 - September 2012
- Plot Outline: Deadpool still doesn't have his healing factor. This isn't a good thing when old enemies start gunning for him.

===== "The Salted Earth" (#61-63) =====
- Published: October 2012
- Plot Outline: Deadpool's nemeses take their revenge! Wade comes to a terrible realization! Daniel Way's epic run comes to a screeching halt! All this and the 4-year series comes to an end! Wait- didn't we say that already?

==== Collected Editions ====
The series has been collected into a number of individual volumes:

- Volume 1: Secret Invasion (collects Deadpool (vol. 2) #1-5, 120 pages, Marvel Comics, hardcover, March 2009, ISBN 0-7851-3273-2, softcover, July 2009, ISBN 0-7851-3273-2)
- Volume 2: Dark Reign (collects Deadpool (vol. 2) #6-7 and 10-12, 112 pages, Marvel Comics, hardcover, September 2009, ISBN 0-7851-3980-X, softcover, December 2009, ISBN 0-7851-3274-0)
- Dark Reign: Deadpool/Thunderbolts (collects Deadpool (vol. 2) #8-9 and Thunderbolts #130-131, 96 pages, Marvel Comics, softcover, July 2009, ISBN 0-7851-4090-5)
- Volume 3: X Marks the Spot (collects Deadpool (vol. 2) #13-18, 144 pages, Marvel Comics, March 2010, hardcover, ISBN 0-7851-4311-4, softcover, ISBN 0-7851-4040-9)
- Volume 4: Monkey Business (collects Deadpool (vol. 2) #19-22, and Hit-Monkey One-Shot, 120 pages, Marvel Comics, hardcover, July 2010, ISBN 0-7851-4530-3, softcover, December 2010, ISBN 0-7851-4531-1)
- Volume 5: What Happens in Vegas (collects Deadpool (vol. 2) #23-26, 120 pages, Marvel Comics, hardcover, October 2010, ISBN 0-7851-4532-X, softcover, March 2011)
- Volume 6: I Rule, You Suck (collects Deadpool (vol.2) #27-31, 120 pages, Marvel Comics, hardcover, March 2011, softcover, July 2011)
- Volume 7: Space Oddity (collects Deadpool (vol.2) #32-35, 33.1, 120 pages, Marvel Comics, hardcover, June 2011, softcover, November 2011)
- Volume 8: Operation Annihilation (collects Deadpool (vol. 2) #36-39, and Deadpool (vol. 3) #4, 112 pages, Marvel Comics, hardcover, October 2011, softcover, April 2012)
- Volume 9: Institutionalized (collects Deadpool (vol. 2) #40-44, 120 pages, Marvel Comics, hardcover, January 2012)
- Volume 10: Evil Deadpool (collects Deadpool (vol. 2) #45-49, 49.1, 144 pages, Marvel Comics, hardcover, April 2012)
- Volume 11: DEAD (collects Deadpool (vol. 2) #50-63, 328 pages, Marvel Comics, hardcover, December 2012, ISBN 0-7851-6242-9)

=== Volume 3 ===
As part of Marvel's Marvel NOW! initiative a new Deadpool ongoing series was launched, written by Brian Posehn and Gerry Duggan and illustrated by Tony Moore. In the 27th issue of his new series, as part of "All-New Marvel NOW!", Deadpool was married for the third time. Initially a secret, his bride was revealed in the web comic Deadpool: The Gauntlet to be Shiklah, Queen of the Undead. Deadpool also discovers that he has a daughter by the name of Eleanor "Ellie" Camacho from a former flame of Deadpool named Carmelita Camacho.

Deadpool's death occurs in Deadpool #250 "The Death of Deadpool", involving story ideas that cowriters Gerry Duggan and Brian Posehn have had in mind since the beginning of the NOW series. Issue #250 was technically issue #45 but was so named as it was the cumulative 250th issue of the character's solo series. Deadpool faces off in a final showdown with ULTIMATUM and Flag-Smasher, killing all of them, and gives up the "Deadpool" identity, wishing to have a better life. He, along with his family and friends, (and presumably everyone on Earth) are all killed when the Earth collides with an alternate universe's Earth. Deadpool laments that the Secret Wars should have stayed an Avengers event, but then dies at peace, content that everybody else is dying with him.

=== Volume 4 ===
Deadpool Vol. 4 began in 2015, lasting for 36 issues and written by Gerry Duggan.

=== Volume 5: Despicable Deadpool ===
Deadpool Vol. 5 began in 2017, lasting for 14 issues. This Volume was subtitled Despicable Deadpool, was written by Gerry Duggan and included issue #300.

=== Volume 6 ===
Deadpool Vol. 6 began in 2018, was written by Skottie Young and lasted for 15 issues.

=== Volume 7: King Deadpool ===
Deadpool Vol. 7 began in 2019, was written by Kelly Thompson and lasted for 10 issues.

=== Volume 8 ===
Deadpool Vol. 8 began in 2022, was written by Alyssa Wong and lasted for 10 issues.

=== Volume 9 ===
Deadpool Vol. 9 began in 2024, was written by Cody Ziglar and lasted for 15 issues. This volume included issue #350.

=== Volume 10 ===
In 2026, a new volume of Deadpool will begin after the end of the crossover storyline Age of Revelation, titled Wade Wilson: Deadpool. It will be written by Benjamin Percy.
