= Gideon (comics) =

- Cover to X-Force #12 featuring Gideon (above) and Crule (below); Art by Mark Pacella.

Publication information
- Publisher: Marvel Comics
- First appearance: The New Mutants #98 (February 1991)
- Created by: Rob Liefeld, Fabian Nicieza

In-story information
- Alter ego: Gideon
- Species: Human mutant
- Team affiliations: Externals; High Lords
- Abilities: Ability to copy and amplify the advanced skills, talents, or powers of nearby people or mechanical beings and redirect them

Gideon is a fictional character, a mutant supervillain appearing in American comic books published by Marvel Comics. He was created by Rob Liefeld and Fabian Nicieza. Gideon was a member of the Externals, a unique type of immortal mutant, and an adversary of the X-Men spin-off group X-Force. He first appeared in The New Mutants #98 (February 1991).

== Fictional character biography ==
Gideon was once a sailor with the Spanish armada sailing for the Americas several hundred years ago. He died from scurvy and was buried when the ship reached land. A few hours later, Gideon awakened, discovering that he was immortal. Over several centuries, Gideon amassed a vast personal wealth. He also encountered and allied himself with several other Externals, a group of fellow immortal mutants. At the end of the 20th century, the group begins seeking out their newest member, whom Gideon erroneously believed to be Roberto da Costa, a young mutant who had joined the New Mutants as Sunspot. Gideon had known Roberto from a young age, having business relations with his father, businessman Emmanuel da Costa. Gideon has his servant Eve kill Emmanuel, then takes Roberto under his care.

Gideon mentors Sunspot for a short while, until it was discovered that not Sunspot but his New Mutants teammate and best friend, Sam Guthrie (Cannonball) was the new External they had been seeking. Gideon meets with the other Externals, and proposes sending Crule to capture Cannonball. He contacts Crule, and then gives Sunspot over to one of his scientific labs, where he is experimented on and has his powers augmented. Gideon forces Cannonball to promise not to interfere with External affairs in return for Sunspot's life.

== Powers and abilities ==
Gideon is a mutant with the ability to temporarily copy the abilities of any being in his proximity. He scans and replicates his target's energy signatures and genetic templates, granting him a full understanding of the potential applications of the powers he acquires and enabling him to overwhelm an opponent with a superior mastery of their own powers. Gideon is an External, meaning he is immortal and that he can regenerate injured or missing cells from even near-fatal injuries.

Gideon wears body armor, and has access to androids, advanced vehicles, and other advanced technology developed by Ophrah Industries.
