= Adventures of Captain America =

Comic book limited series by Marvel Comics

- Cover for the first issue

Publication information
- Publisher: Marvel Comics
- Format: Limited series
- Genre: Superhero, war
- Publication date: September 1991-January 1992
- No. of issues: 4

Creative team
- Written by: Fabian Nicieza

Adventures of Captain America, also known in trade as The Adventures of Captain America: Sentinel of Liberty, is a comic book limited series which was published by Marvel Comics. It was a four issue limited series written by Fabian Nicieza. The first two issues were drawn by Kevin Maguire while Kevin West was brought in to help out with the third and complete the story with the final issue.

== Publication history ==
1. First Flight Of The Eagle (September 1991)
2. Betrayed By Agent X (November 1991)
3. Battleground: Paris (December 1991)
4. Angels Of Death Angels Of Hope (January 1992)

== Plot ==
The storyline re-tells the early years of Steve Rogers' turn as the Star-Spangled Avenger.

== See also ==
- 1991 in comics
