= Lojze Spazzapan =

Italian painter

Lojze Špacapan, (Italian: Luigi Spazzapan) (Gradisca d'Isonzo, 18 April 1889 – Turin, 18 February 1958) was an Italian painter from the Slovene community in Italy, considered one of the most important postwar Italian exponents of Abstract Art.

He was born as the third of five children to father Gustav Špacapan (Italianized Giustino Spazzapan), a prison guard, and Josipina Mervič (Italianized Giuseppina Mervi).

In 1920 he worked as a teacher of mathematics at the middle schools of Idrija, where one of his pupils was the author of the first Slovene comic strip Milko Bambič. Spazzapan left teaching to devote himself entirely to his passion, painting.

In 1923 he participated in Padua in an exhibition of futurism art movement which he had recently met through the group founded by artists Giorgio Carmelich, Sophronius Pocarini, and Mario Mirko Vucetich.

His artistic training was accomplished through several journeys he undertook in his youth in the major art centers, including Munich with Kandinsky, assimilating styles of Art Nouveau, Futurism, Expressionism, and Abstract Art.

In 1928 he moved to Turin, where his meeting the Group of Six of Turin allowed him to create a personal style in his work. In 1936 he was invited to the Venice Biennale, where, in 1954, had a solo show distinguishing himself as a notable artist.
