= The Blackburne Covenant =

- Cover of The Blackburne Covenant trade paperback Art by Stefano Raffaele

Publication information
- Publisher: Dark Horse Comics
- Schedule: Monthly
- Format: Limited series
- Genre: Horror
- Publication date: April – July 2003
- No. of issues: 4
- Main character(s): Richard Kaine

Creative team
- Created by: Fabian Nicieza; Stefano Raffaele
- Written by: Fabian Nicieza
- Artist(s): Stefano Raffaele
- Letterer(s): Mike Heisler
- Colorist(s): Elena Sanjust
- Editor(s): Scott Allie; Matt Dryer

Collected editions
- Hardcover: ISBN 1-56971-889-X

The Blackburne Covenant is a four-issue horror fiction comic book limited series published in 2003 by Dark Horse Comics.

All four issues are written by Fabian Nicieza with the art by Stefano Raffaele.

== Plot ==
Horror writer Richard Kaine has just succeeded in writing his first best selling novel, Wintersong, about a medieval nature worshipping cult that is destroyed by an organization named the Blackburne Covenant. While celebrating, Richard begins to exhibit the supernatural ability to contact a lifeforce of nature called the Greenway.

Over the course of the series Richard discovers that his novel is not the fiction he thought it was. He must discover just what the Greenway is and survive the assassination attempts by agents of the still existing Blackburne Covenant.

== Collected editions ==
The series has been collected into a single volume:

- The Blackburne Covenant (104 pages, hardcover, January 2004, ISBN 1-56971-889-X)
