= Stefano Raffaele =

Italian comics book artist

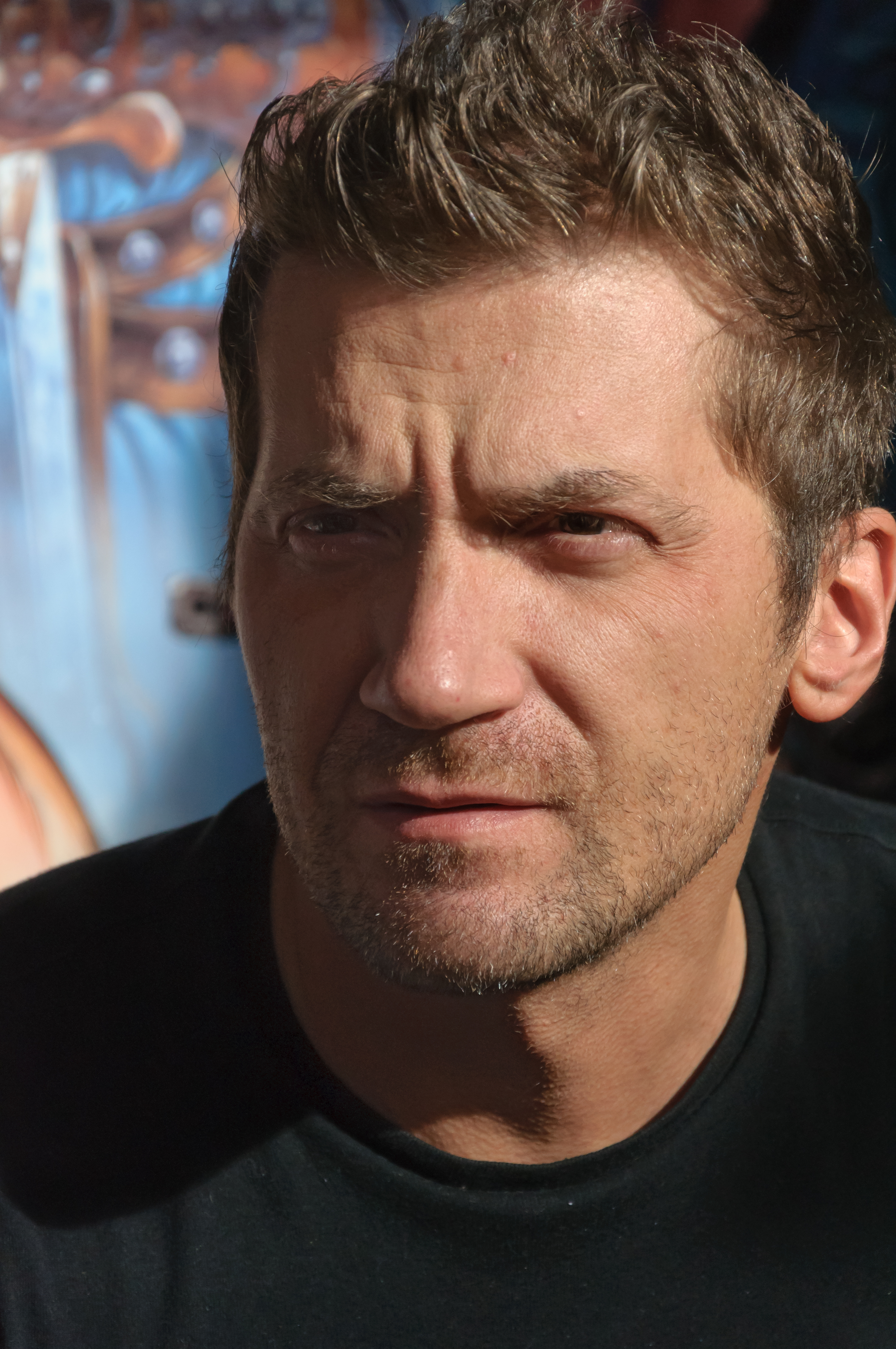
- Stefano Raffaele, at the 40th Angoulême International Comics Festival, 2013.
- Born: March 15, 1970 (age 56) Milan
- Areas: Writer, Penciller, Inker

Stefano Raffaele (born March 15, 1970) is an Italian comics book artist.

== Biography ==
Born in Milan, his first published work was in Lazarus Ledd #4 in 1994. From the following year, he worked for American comics series such as New Gods, Birds of Prey, Batman, X-Men Adventures, X-Factor and Conan the Barbarian. In 2000, he penciled Arkhain, a science-fiction mini-series published by Marvel Italia. He also wrote and drew Fragile which appeared in Metal Hurlant magazine.

In 2007, it was announced that Fragile would be made into a film to be directed by Eduardo Rodriguez.

== Bibliography ==
Comics work includes:

- X-Factor #125(with writer Howard Mackie, and penciller Jeff Matsuda, Marvel, 1986)
- X-Men Adventures #7(with writer Ralph Macchino, and cover artist Bryan Hitch, Marvel, 1995)
- Hawkeye #1-7(Marvel, 2003)
- The Blackburne Covenant (with writer Fabian Nicieza, 4-issue mini-series, Dark Horse Comics, 2003, hardcover, ISBN 1-56971-889-X)
- Fragile (script and art, in Metal Hurlant magazine, #4, 7–8, 10–14, 2003–2004, tpb, DC Comics, 168 pages, 2005, ISBN 1-4012-0645-X)
