= List of Deadpool titles =

Deadpool is a comic book anti-hero in the Marvel Universe. Since 1993 he has starred in several ongoing series, as well as a number of limited series and one-shots.

== Primary series ==
LGY	Issues	Writer(s)	Publication	
Deadpool: The Circle Chase
#1-4	Deadpool The Circle Chase #1–4	Fabian Nicieza	August 1993	November 1993
Deadpool (1994)
#5-8	Deadpool (1994) #1–4	Mark Waid	August 1994	November 1994
Deadpool (1997)
#9-15	Deadpool (1997) #1-7	Joe Kelly	May 1997	August 1997
	Daredevil/Deadpool '97 Annual	Joe Kelly	September 1997	
#16-25	Deadpool (1997) #8-17	Joe Kelly	September 1997	June 1998
	1998 Annual Starring Deadpool and Death	Joe Kelly	July 1998	
#26-41	Deadpool (1997) #18-33	Joe Kelly	July 1998	October 1999
#42-53	Deadpool (1997) #34-45	Christopher Priest	November 1999	October 2000
#54-63	Deadpool (1997) #46-55	Jimmy Palmiotti	November 2000	August 2001
#64	Deadpool (1997) #56	Buddy Scalera	September 2001	
#65-72	Deadpool (1997) #57-64	Frank Tieri	October 2001	May 2002
#73-77	Deadpool (1997) #65-69	Gail Simone and UDON	May 2002	September 2002
Agent X
#78-84	Agent X #1-7	Gail Simone and UDON	September 2002	March 2003
#85-86	Agent X #8-9	Christopher Priest	April 2003	May 2003
#87-88	Agent X #10-11	Jimmy Palmiotti	June 2003	July 2003
#89	Agent X #12	Buddy Scalera	August 2003	
#90-92	Agent X #13-15	Gail Simone and UDON	November 2003	December 2003
Cable & Deadpool
#93-142	Cable & Deadpool #1-50	Fabian Nicieza	May 2004	April 2008
Deadpool (2008)
#143-158	Deadpool (2008) #1-16	Daniel Way	September 2008	December 2009
	Deadpool (2008) #900	Various	December 2009	
#159-167	Deadpool (2008) #17-25	Daniel Way	January 2010	September 2010
	Deadpool (2008) #1000	Various	October 2010	
#168-178	Deadpool (2008) #26-36, 33.1	Daniel Way	October 2010	June 2011
	Deadpool Annual #1	John Layman	July 2011	
#179-205	Deadpool (2008) #37-63, 49.1	Daniel Way	July 2011	December 2012
Deadpool (2013)
#206-224	Deadpool (2013) #1-19	Brian Posehn & Gerry Duggan	January 2013	January 2014
	Deadpool (2013) Annual #1	Ben Acker & Ben Blacker	January 2014	
#225-233	Deadpool (2013) #20-28	Brian Posehn & Gerry Duggan	February 2014	July 2014
	Deadpool (2013) Annual #2	Christopher Hastings	July 2014	
#234-239	Deadpool (2013) #29-34	Brian Posehn & Gerry Duggan	July 2014	November 2014
	Deadpool Bi-Annual #1	Paul Scheer & Nick Giovannetti	November 2014	
#240-250	Deadpool (2013) #35-45	Brian Posehn & Gerry Duggan	November 2014	June 2015
Deadpool (2015)
#251-286	Deadpool (2015) #1-36, 3.1	Gerry Duggan	November 2015	September 2017
The Despicable Deadpool
#287-300	The Despicable Deadpool #287-300	Gerry Duggan	October 2017	July 2018
Deadpool (2018)
#301-315	Deadpool (2018) #1-15	Skottie Young	June 2018	September 2019
	Deadpool (2018) Annual #1	Dana Schwartz	October 2019	
Deadpool (2019)
#316-325	Deadpool (2019) #1-10	Kelly Thompson	November 2019	January 2021
Deadpool (2022)
#326-335	Deadpool (2022) #1-10	Alyssa Wong	November 2022	May 2023
Deadpool (2024)
#336-350	Deadpool (2024) #1-15	Cody Ziglar	April 2024	June 2025
Wade Wilson: Deadpool
#351-	Wade Wilson: Deadpool #1-	Benjamin Percy	February 2026	

== Spin-off series ==
- Deadpool: Merc With a Mouth #1–13 (September 2009 – September 2010)
- Deadpool Team-Up #899–883 (December 2009 – May 2011). Title released in reverse since #899.
- Hit Monkey #1 (April 2010)
- Prelude to Deadpool Corps #1–5 (May 2010)
- Deadpool Corps #1–12 (June 2010 – May 2011)
- Deadpool MAX #1–12 (December 2010 – September 2011)
- Deadpool MAX II #1–6 (October 2011 – March 2012)
- Gwenpool Holiday Special #1 (December 2015)
- Spider-Man/Deadpool #1–50 (March 2016 – May 2019)
- Deadpool & The Mercs for Money Vol. 1 #1–5 (April 2016 – August 2016)
- Deadpool & The Mercs for Money Vol. 2 #1–10 (September 2016 – June 2017)
- Deadpool/Wolverine #1-10 (Jan 2025-Oct 2025)

== Limited series ==
Deadpool Suicide Kings	#1–5	June 2009 – October 2009
Deadpool: Wade Wilson's War	#1–4	August – November 2010
Deadpool Pulp	#1–4	November 2010 – February 2011
Fear Itself: Deadpool	#1–3	August – October 2011
Deadpool Kills the Marvel Universe	#1–4	October 2012
Deadpool Killustrated	#1–4	March – June 2013
Deadpool Kills Deadpool	#1–4	July – October 2013
Night of the Living Deadpool	#1–4	January – March 2014
Deadpool Vs. Carnage	#1–4	June – August 2014
Deadpool: Dracula's Gauntlet	#1–7	July – August 2014
Deadpool Vs. X-Force	#1–4	July – September 2014
Hawkeye Vs. Deadpool	#0–4	September 2014 – January 2015
Deadpool's Art of War	#1–4	October 2014 – January 2015
Return of the Living Deadpool	#1–4	February – May 2015
Deadpool's Secret Secret Wars	#1–4	May 2015 – August 2015
Mrs. Deadpool and the Howling Commandos	#1–4	September 2015 – November 2015
Deadpool vs. Thanos	#1–4	September 2015 – October 2015
Deadpool & Cable: Split Second	#1–3	December 2015 – February 2016
Deadpool v Gambit	#1–5	August 2016 – November 2016
Deadpool Back in Black	#1–5	December 2016 – February 2017
Deadpool Too Soon?	#1–4	December 2016 – March 2017
Deadpool The Duck	#1–5	March 2017 – May 2017
Deadpool vs. The Punisher	#1–5	June 2017 – August 2017
Deadpool Kills The Marvel Universe Again	#1–5	July 2017 – September 2017
Deadpool vs. Old Man Logan	#1–5	October 2017 – February 2018
You are Deadpool	#1–5	May 2018
Deadpool: Assassin	#1–6	June 2018 – August 2018
Deadpool: Secret Agent Deadpool	#1–6	September 2018 – November 2018
Black Panther vs. Deadpool	#1–5	October 2018 – February 2019
Absolute Carnage vs. Deadpool	#1–3	August 2019 – October 2019
Deadpool: Black, White & Blood	#1-4	August 2021 – November 2021
Deadpool Samurai	#1-2	Feb 2022
Deadpool Bad Blood	#1-4	April 2022 – June 2022
Deadpool Badder Blood	#1-5	April 2023 – Aug 2023
Deadpool and Wolverine: WWIII	#1-3	May 2024 – Aug 2024
Deadpool Team-Up	#1-5	Aug 2024 – Dec 2024
Venom War: Deadpool	#1-3	Sep 2024 – Nov 2024
Deadpool Kills the Marvel Universe One Last Time	#1-5	Apr 2025 – Aug 2025
Wolverines and Deadpools	#1-3	Jul 2025 – Sep 2025

== Digital series ==
- Deadpool: The Gauntlet Infinite Comic #1–13 (January – April 2014)
- Deadpool & Cable: Split Second Infinite Comic #1–6
- Deadpool: Too Soon? Infinite Comic #1–8

== One-shots ==
- Encyclopædia Deadpoolica (December 1998)
- Baby's First Deadpool Book #1 (December 1998)
- Deadpool Team-Up Starring Deadpool and Widdle Wade #1 (December 1998)
- Deadpool/GLI: Summer Fun Spectacular (September 2007)
- Deadpool: Game$ of Death #1 (May 2009)
- Deadpool Corps: Rank and Foul (March 2010)
- Lady Deadpool #1 (July 2010)
- X-Men Origins: Deadpool #1 (July 2010)
- What If Venom Possessed Deadpool? #1 (February 2011)
- Deadpool/Cable #26 (February 2011).
- Deadpool Family #1 (April 2011)
- Wolverine/Deadpool: The Decoy #1 (July 2011)
- Deadpool Max-mas #1 (December 2011)
- Deadpool Bi-Annual #1 (September 2014)
- Death of Wolverine: Deadpool & Captain America #1 (October 2014)
- Deadpool: Last Days of Magic #1 (May 2016)
- Cable/Deadpool Annual #1 (August 2018)
- Season's Beatings #1 (December 2018)
- Deadpool: The End #1 (January 2021)
- Deadpool Nerdy 30 #1 ( March 2021)
- X-Force: Killshot #1 (Jan 2022)
- Deadpool Seven Slaughters #1 (Nov 2023)

=== Graphic novels ===
- Deadpool: Bad Blood (112 pages, Marvel Comics, hardcover, May 2017, 978-1302901530)

== Collected editions ==
=== Epic Collections ===
#	Subtitle	Years covered	Issues collected	Legacy	Writers	Artists	Pages	Released	ISBN
1	The Circle Chase	1991-1994	New Mutants #98; X-Force #2, 11, 15; Nomad #4; Deadpool: The Circle Chase #1-4; Secret Defenders #15-17; Deadpool #1-4; material from Avengers #366; Silver Sable & the Wild Pack #23	#1-8	Rob Liefeld, Fabian Nicieza, Mark Waid	Rob Liefeld, Joe Madureira, Ian Churchill	472	9 Nov 2021	New Mutants #98 cover: 978-1302932053
2	Mission Improbable	1994-1997	Wolverine #88; X-Force #47 & 56; Deadpool (vol. 2) #1-9 & -1; Daredevil/Deadpool Annual 1997; material from Wolverine Annual 1995	#9-17	Jeph Loeb, Joe Kelly	Adam Pollina, Ed McGuinness, Bernard Chang	448	25 Oct 2022	Deadpool (vol. 2) #2 cover: 978-1302948177
3	Drowning Man	1997-1998	Deadpool (vol. 2) #10-20; Deadpool/Death Annual '98; Heroes for Hire #10-11; Baby's First Deadpool Book #1; Amazing Spider-Man #47	#18-28	Joe Kelly, John Ostrander	Pete Woods, Walter McDaniel, Tony Harris	464	9 Jan 2024	Deadpool (vol. 2) #15 cover: 978-1302953324
4	Dead Reckoning	1998-1999	Deadpool (vol. 2) #0, 21–33; Deadpool Team-Up #1; Encyclopaedia Deadpoolica #1	#29-41	Joe Kelly, James Felder	Pete Woods, Walter McDaniel, David Brewer	472	4 Jul 2023	Deadpool (vol. 2) #21 cover: 978-1302951825
5	Johnny Handsome	1999-2000	Deadpool (vol. 2) #34-45; Black Panther (vol. 3) #23; Wolverine (vol. 2) #154-155; Heroes Reborn: Remnants #1; Fight Man #1; material from Wolverine Annual 1999	#42-53	Christopher Priest	Paco Diaz, Jim Calafiore, Rob Liefeld, Evan Dorkin	488	3 Sep 2024	Wolverine (vol. 2) #155 cover: 978-1302959579
7	Agent X	2002-2003	Deadpool (vol. 2) #65-69; Agent X #1-15	#73-92	Gail Simone, Buddy Scalera, Evan Dorkin	Udon Studios, Mitch Breitweiser, Juan Bobillo	496	8 Jul 2025	Agent X #15 cover: 978-1302964078

=== Modern Era Epic Collections ===
==== Deadpool ====
#	Subtitle	Years covered	Issues collected	Legacy	Writers	Artists	Pages	Released	ISBN
1	Magnum Opus	2008-2009	Wolverine: Origins #21-25; Deadpool (vol. 3) #1-12; Thunderbolts #130-131	#143-154	Daniel Way	Paco Medina, Steve Dillon	472	13 Jan 2026	978-1302965419
2	X X Baby	2009-2010	Deadpool (vol. 3) #13-31	#155-173	Daniel Way	Paco Medina, Carlo Barberi, Shawn Crystal, Jose Pimentel	464	7 Jul 2026	978-1302967147
5	In Wade We Trust	2012-2013	Deadpool (vol. 4) #1-19	#206-224	Brian Posehn, Gerry Duggan	Tony Moore, Scott Koblish, Mike Hawthorne, Declan Shalvey	448	6 May 2025	Deadpool (vol. 4) #15 cover: 978-1302964511

==== Deadpool and Cable ====
#	Subtitle	Years covered	Issues collected	Legacy	Writers	Artists	Pages	Released	ISBN
1	Ballistic Bromance	2004-2005	Cable & Deadpool #1-18	#93-110	Fabian Nicieza	Patch Zircher, Mark Brooks, Marvin Law	424	7 Aug 2024	Cable & Deadpool #1 cover: 978-1302960902

==== Spider-Man/Deadpool ====
#	Subtitle	Years covered	Issues collected	Writers	Artists	Pages	Released	ISBN
1	Isn't It Bromantic?	2016-2018	Spider-Man / Deadpool #1-14, 17–18, 1.MU	Joe Kelly, Scott Aukerman, Gerry Duggan, Penn Jillette, Paul Scheer, Nick Giovannetti, Joshua Corin	Ed McGuinness, Reilly Brown, Scott Koblish, Todd Nauck, David Walker	400	31 Oct 2023	Spider-Man / Deadpool #13 cover: 978-1302951641
2	Til Death Do Us	2017-2018	Spider-Man / Deadpool #15-16, 19-32; Deadpool (vol. 6) #28-29; Deadpool And The Mercs For Money #9-10	Gerry Duggan, Joshua Corin, Christopher Hastings, Elliott Kalan, Robbie Thompson	Salva Espin, Scott Koblish, Iban Coello, Will Robson, Todd Nauck, Chris Bachalo, Scott Hepburn, Elmo Bondoc	440	3 Sep 2024	Spider-Man / Deadpool #31 cover: 978-1302959838
3	Road Trip	2019-2020	Spider-Man / Deadpool #33-50	Robbie Thompson	Matt Horak, Jim Towe, Scott Hepburn, Flaviano Armentaro, Nick Roche	416	2 Sep 2025	Spider-Man / Deadpool #33 cover: 978-1302965600

=== Limited series ===
Title	Material collected	Pages	Publication Date	ISBN
Deadpool: The Circle Chase	Deadpool: The Circle Chase #1–4	96	March 1997	ISBN 0-7851-0259-0
Deadpool II: Sins of the Past	Deadpool #1–4	96	January 1997	ISBN 0-7851-0554-9

=== First series (1997) and Deadpool Classic ===
Title	Material collected	Pages	Publication Date	ISBN
Volume 1	New Mutants #98, Deadpool: The Circle Chase, Deadpool: Sins of the Past, and Deadpool (vol. 1) #1	264	May 2008	ISBN 978-0785131243
Volume 2	Deadpool (vol. 1) #2–8 and -1, and Daredevil/Deadpool Annual 1997	256	April 2009	ISBN 0-7851-3731-9
Volume 3	Deadpool (vol. 1) #9–17, and Amazing Spider-Man #47	280	November 2009	ISBN 0-7851-4244-4
Volume 4	Deadpool (vol. 1) #18–25, #0, and Deadpool & Death Annual 1998	296	February 2011	ISBN 0-7851-5302-0
Volume 5	Deadpool (vol. 1) #26–33, Baby's First Deadpool Book, and Deadpool Team-Up #1	272	June 2011	ISBN 0-7851-5519-8
Volume 6	Deadpool (vol. 1) #34–45 and Black Panther #23	312	February 2012	ISBN 978-0785159414
Volume 7	Deadpool (vol. 1) #46–56 and X-Men Unlimited #28	272	August 2012	ISBN 978-0785162384
Volume 8	Deadpool (vol. 1) #57–64	182	March 2013	ISBN 978-0-7851-6732-7
Volume 9	Deadpool (vol. 1) #65–69 and Agent X #1–6	271	December 2013	ISBN 0-7851-8513-5
Volume 10	Agent X #7–15 and Fight-Man #1	266	November 2014	ISBN 0-7851-9046-5
Volume 11: Merc with a Mouth	Deadpool Merc With a Mouth #1–13 and Lady Deadpool #1	366	June 2015	ISBN 0-7851-9730-3
Volume 12: Deadpool Corps	Deadpool Prelude to Deadpool Corps #1–5, Deadpool Corps #1–12 and Deadpool Family #1	481	August 2015	ISBN 0-7851-9731-1
Volume 13: Deadpool Team-Up	Deadpool Team-Up #1, Deadpool Team-up #899–883	448	October 2015	ISBN 0-7851-9732-X
Volume 14: Suicide Kings	Deadpool: Games of Death #1, Deadpool: Suicide Kings #1–5, Deadpool #900 and #1000, X-Men Origins: Deadpool and materials from Marvel Digital Holiday Special 2 and Marvel Spotlight: Deadpool	392	December 2015	ISBN 0-7851-9733-8
Volume 15: All the Rest	Captain America: Who Won't Wield the Shield #1, Cable #25, Deadpool & Cable #26, Amazing Spider-Man Annual #38, Deadpool Annual #1, Incredible Hulks Annual 1, Wolverine/Deadpool: The Decoy #1, Fear Itself: Deadpool #1–3 and Deadpool Corps: Rank and Foul #1	360	March 2016	ISBN 0-7851-9690-0
Volume 16: Killogy	Deadpool Kills the Marvel Universe #1–4, Deadpool Killustrated #1–4, and Deadpool Kills Deadpool #1–4	280	June 2016	ISBN 978-0785195412
Volume 17: Headcanon	Deadpool: Wade Wilson's War #1–4, Deadpool Pulp #1–4, Night of The Living Deadpool #1–4, and Return of The Living Deadpool #1–4	384	March 2017	ISBN 978-1302904302
Volume 18: Deadpool vs. Marvel	Deadpool vs. X-Force #1–4, Deadpool Annual #1–2, Deadpool vs. Thanos #1–4, Deadpool vs. Carnage #1–4, Hawkeye vs. Deadpool #0–4	488	July 2017	ISBN 978-1302906856
Volume 19: Make Love, Not War	Deadpool Bi-Annual #1, Deadpool's Art of War #1–4, Deadpool's Secret Secret Wars #1–4, Mrs. Deadpool and the Howling Commandos #1–4	328	October 2017	ISBN 978-1302907709
Volume 20: Ultimate Deadpool	Ultimate Spider-Man #91–94, Heroes Reborn: Remnants #1, Exiles #5–6, 12-13, 66-68, Venom/Deadpool: What If? Ronin #1–5, Marvel Adventures Super Heroes #4, Marvel Universe Ultimate Spider-Man: Web Warriors #8 and materials from J2 #11, Secret Wars: Battleworld #3 and Secret Wars, Too #1	504	January 2018	ISBN 978-1302907662
Volume 21: DvX	Deadpool & Cable: Split Second #1–3, Deadpool V Gambit #1–5, Deadpool: Too Soon? #1–5 and materials from Gwenpool Special #1 and Gwenpool Holiday Special: Merry Mix-Up #1	368	January 2018	ISBN 978-1302910105
Volume 22: Murder Most Fowl	Deadpool The Duck #1–5, Deadpool Vs. The Punisher #1–5 and Deadpool Kills The Marvel Universe Again #1–5	344	May 2018	ISBN 978-1302504519
Volume 23: Mercs For Money	Deadpool & The Mercs For Money (vol. 1) #1–5, Deadpool & The Mercs For Money (vol. 2) #1–8 and Deadpool: Back In Black #1–5	432	March 2019	ISBN 978-1302916046
Companion Volume 1	Nomad (vol. 2) #4; Secret Defenders #15–17; Wolverine (vol. 2) #88, 154–155; X-Force #47, 56; Heroes for Hire #10–11; Material from Avengers #366; Silver Sable & the Wild Pack #23, 30; Wolverine Annual '95, '99; Contest of Champions II 2; Marvel Comics Presents #10; Breaking into Comics the Marvel Way #2	328	April 2015	ISBN 978-0785192947
Companion Volume 2	Identity Disc #1–5; Ms. Marvel (2006) #40–41; Hulk (2008) #14–17 and #21; Amazing Spider-Man (1999) #611; Doomwar #5–6; Hulked-Out Heroes #1–2; Material From Shang-Chi: Master Of Kung Fu (2009) #1; X-Force Annual (2009) #1 and World War Hulks #1	496	May 2018	978-1302912437
Deadpool by Joe Kelly Complete Collection Volume 1	Deadpool #1-11, -1; Daredevil/Deadpool Annual '97; Amazing Spider-Man #47		2019	
Deadpool by Joe Kelly Complete Collection Volume 2	Deadpool (1997) #0, 12-20; Deadpool and Death Annual '98; Baby's First Deadpool Book #1; Encyclopaedia Deadpoolica #1		2021	
Deadpool by Joe Kelly Omnibus	Deadpool (1997) #1–33, -1 & 0; Daredevil/Deadpool Annual '97; Deadpool & Death '98; Baby's First Deadpool Book; Amazing Spider-Man #47 & 611; material from Deadpool #900		January 2014	978-0785185604
Deadpool Classic Omnibus Volume 1	Deadpool (1997) #34–69; Black Panther (1998) #23; Agent X #1–15; Fight-Man #1; and material from X-Men Unlimited (1993) #28		January 2016	978-0785196747

=== Cable & Deadpool (2004) ===
Title	Material collected	Pages	Publication Date	ISBN
Volume 1: If Looks Could Kill	Cable & Deadpool #1–6	136	December 2004	ISBN 0-7851-1374-6
Volume 2: The Burnt Offering	Cable & Deadpool #7–12	144	May 2005	ISBN 0-7851-1571-4
Volume 3: The Human Race	Cable & Deadpool #13–18	144	November 2005	ISBN 0-7851-1763-6
Volume 4: Bosom Buddies	Cable & Deadpool #19–24	144	April 2005	ISBN 0-7851-1869-1
Volume 5: Living Legends	Cable & Deadpool #25–29	144	August 2006	ISBN 0-7851-2041-6
Volume 6: Paved With Good Intentions	Cable & Deadpool #30–35	144	May 2007	ISBN 0-7851-2233-8
Volume 7: Separation Anxiety	Cable & Deadpool #36–42	176	September 2007	ISBN 0-7851-2523-X
Volume 8: Deadpool vs The Marvel Universe	Cable & Deadpool #43–50	192	May 2008	ISBN 0-7851-2524-8
Deadpool & Cable Ultimate Collection Volume 1	Cable & Deadpool #1-18		March 2010	
Deadpool & Cable Ultimate Collection Volume 2	Cable & Deadpool #19-35		July 2010	
Deadpool & Cable Ultimate Collection Volume 3	Cable & Deadpool #36-50, Deadpool/GLI: Summer Fun Spectacular		October 2010	
Deadpool & Cable Epic Collection Volume 1: Ballistic Bromance	Cable & Deadpool #1-18		August 2024	978-1302952709
Cable & Deadpool Omnibus	Cable & Deadpool #1–50; Deadpool/GLI Summer Fun Spectacular; and material from Deadpool (2012) #27		November 2014	978-0785192763

=== Second series (2008) by Daniel Way ===
Title	Material collected	Pages	Publication Date	ISBN
Volume 1: Secret Invasion	Deadpool (vol. 2) #1–5	120	July 2009	ISBN 978-0785132738
Volume 2: Dark Reign	Deadpool (vol. 2) #6–7 and 10–12	112	December 2009	ISBN 978-0785132745
Dark Reign: Deadpool/Thunderbolts	Deadpool (vol. 2) #8–9 and Thunderbolts #130–131	96	July 2009	ISBN 978-0785140900
Volume 3: X Marks the Spot	Deadpool (vol. 2) #13–18	144	March 2010	ISBN 978-0785140405
Volume 4: Monkey Business	Deadpool (vol. 2) #19–22 and Hit-Monkey #1	120	December 2010	ISBN 978-0785145318
Volume 5: What Happened in Vegas	Deadpool (vol. 2) #23–26	120	March 2011	ISBN 978-0785145332
Volume 6: I Rule, You Suck	Deadpool (vol. 2) #27–31	120	July 2011	ISBN 978-0785151364
Volume 7: Space Oddity	Deadpool (vol. 2) #32–35, 33.1	120	November 2011	ISBN 978-0785151388
Volume 8: Operation Annihilation	Deadpool (vol. 2) #36–39	112	April 2012	ISBN 978-0785158905
Volume 9: Institutionalized	Deadpool (vol. 2) #40–44	120	June 2012	ISBN 978-0785158929
Volume 10: Evil Deadpool	Deadpool (vol. 2) #45–49	144	April 2012	ISBN 978-0785160113
Volume 11: DEAD	Deadpool (vol. 2) #50–63	328	December 2012	ISBN 978-0785162421
Deadpool by Daniel Way: The Complete Collection Vol. 1	Wolverine Origins #21-25, Deadpool (vol. 2) issues #1-12, Thunderbolts #130–131	472	August 13, 2013	ISBN 978-0785185321
Deadpool by Daniel Way: The Complete Collection Vol. 2	Deadpool (vol. 2) issues #13-31	464	December 24, 2013	ISBN 978-0785185475
Deadpool by Daniel Way: The Complete Collection Vol. 3	Deadpool (vol. 2) issues #32-49, 33.1, 49.1	448	May 20, 2014	ISBN 978-0785188889
Deadpool by Daniel Way: The Complete Collection Vol. 4	Deadpool (vol. 2) issues #50-63	320	August 17, 2014	ISBN 978-0785160120
Deadpool by Daniel Way Omnibus Volume 1	Deadpool (2008) #1–26; Wolverine: Origins #21–25, Thunderbolts (1997) #130–131, Hit-Monkey (2010a) #1, Hit-Monkey (2010B) #1–3 and Deadpool Saga		February 2018	978-130291006-8
Deadpool by Daniel Way Omnibus Volume 2	Deadpool (2008) #27–63, #33.1 and #49.1		August 2018	978-1302911416

=== Third series (2012) by Brian Posehn and Gerry Duggan ===
Title	Material collected	Pages	Publication Date	ISBN
Volume 1: Dead Presidents	Deadpool (vol. 3) #1–6	136	June 2013	ISBN 978-0785166801
Volume 2: Soul Hunter	Deadpool (vol. 3) #7–12	136	August 2013	ISBN 978-0785166818
Volume 3: The Good, The Bad and The Ugly	Deadpool (vol. 3) #13–19	144	December 2013	ISBN 978-0785166825
Volume 4: Deadpool VS S.H.I.E.L.D.	Deadpool (vol. 3) #20–25	136	May 2014	ISBN 978-0785189329
Volume 5: Wedding of Deadpool	Deadpool (vol. 3) #26–28, Deadpool Annual #1	144	August 2014	ISBN 978-0785189336
Volume 6: Original Sin	Deadpool (vol. 3) #29–34	144	December 2014	ISBN 978-0785189343
Volume 7: AXIS	Deadpool (vol. 3) #35–40	136	March 2015	ISBN 978-0785192435
Volume 8: All Good Things...	Deadpool (vol. 3) #41–44, 250	176	June 2015	ISBN 978-0785192442
Deadpool by Posehn & Duggan Volume 1	Deadpool (vol. 3) #1-12		2015	
Deadpool by Posehn & Duggan Volume 2	Deadpool (vol. 3) #13-25		2015	
Deadpool by Posehn & Duggan Volume 3	Deadpool (vol. 3) #26-34, Annual #1		2015	
Deadpool by Posehn & Duggan Volume 4	Deadpool (vol. 3) #35–44, 250		2015	
Deadpool by Posehn & Duggan Complete Collection Volume 1	Deadpool (2012 3rd Series) #1-14, 20, 26		January 2018	
Deadpool by Posehn & Duggan Complete Collection Volume 2	Deadpool (2012 3rd Series) #15-19, 21-25, Deadpool: Dracula's Gauntlet #1-7		March 2018	
Deadpool by Posehn & Duggan Complete Collection Volume 3	Deadpool (2012 3rd Series) #27-34, Hawkeye vs. Deadpool #0-4		July 2018	
Deadpool by Posehn & Duggan Complete Collection Volume 4	Death of Wolverine: Deadpool & Captain America #1, Deadpool (2012 3rd series) #35-45, material from Deadpool Annual #1 (2016)	376	2018	ISBN 978-1302911409
Deadpool By Posehn & Duggan Omnibus	Deadpool (2012) #1–45, Deadpool: Dracula's Gauntlet #1–7 and Death Of Wolverine: Deadpool & Captain America #1		December 2016	978-1302902285

=== Fourth series (2016) by Gerry Duggan ===
Title	Material collected	Pages	Publication Date	ISBN
Volume 1: Millionaire With A Mouth	Deadpool: World's Greatest #1–5	112	April 2016	ISBN 978-0785196174
Volume 2: End of an Error	Deadpool: World's Greatest #3.1: Tres Punto Uno, #6–7	112	June 2016	ISBN 978-0785196181
Volume 3: Deadpool Vs. Sabretooth	Deadpool: World's Greatest #8–12	116	September 2016	ISBN 978-0785196198
Volume 4: Temporary Insanitation	Deadpool: World's Greatest #13, Deadpool: Last Days of Magic #1	112	October 2016	ISBN 978-1302900915
Volume 5: Civil War II	Deadpool: World's Greatest #14–19	136	January 2017	ISBN 978-1302901486
Volume 6: Patience: Zero	Deadpool: World's Greatest #20–25	152	May 2017	ISBN 978-1302902438
Volume 7: Deadpool Does Shakespeare	Deadpool: World's Greatest #26–27	112	June 2017	ISBN 978-1846538049
Volume 8: Til Death Do Us	Deadpool: World's Greatest #28–29, Deadpool & The Mercs for Money #9–10, Spider-Man/Deadpool #15–16	136	September 2017	ISBN 978-1302905439
Volume 9: Deadpool in Space	Deadpool: World's Greatest #30	112	September 2017	ISBN 978-1302907600
Volume 10: Secret Empire	Deadpool: World's Greatest #31–36	136	November 2017	ISBN 978-1302907617
Deadpool: World's Greatest Hardcover Volume 1	Deadpool: World's Greatest #1-7 and 3.1: Tres Punto Uno	264	January 2017	
Deadpool: World's Greatest Hardcover Volume 2	Deadpool: World's Greatest #8-13 and Deadpool: Last Days of Magic	232	October 2017	
Deadpool: World's Greatest Hardcover Volume 3	Deadpool: World's Greatest #14-20, 22-25; material from Deadpool #21	272	January 2018	
Deadpool: World's Greatest Hardcover Volume 4	Deadpool: World's Greatest #26–29, Spider-Man/Deadpool #15-16, Deadpool and the Mercs for Money #9-10; material from Deadpool #21	248	June 2018	
Deadpool: World's Greatest Hardcover Volume 5	Deadpool: World's Greatest #30-37 and Deadpool Secret Comic Variants #1-21	248	September 2018	

=== Despicable Deadpool (2017) by Gerry Duggan ===
Title	Material collected	Pages	Publication Date	ISBN
Volume 1: Deadpool Kills Cable	Despicable Deadpool #287–291	136	March 2018	ISBN 978-1302909949
Volume 2: Bucket List	Despicable Deadpool #292–296	112	May 2018	ISBN 978-1302909956
Volume 3: The Marvel Universe Kills Deadpool	Despicable Deadpool #297–300	112	July 2018	ISBN 978-1302910396
Despicable Deadpool Hardcover	Despicable Deadpool #287-300 and Deadpool Secret Comic Variants #23-25, 30-36	384	May 2019	

=== Sixth series (2018) by Skottie Young ===
Title	Material collected	Pages	Publication Date	ISBN
Volume 1: Mercin' Hard for the Money	Deadpool (vol. 6) #1–6	144	January 15, 2019	ISBN 978-1302911720
Volume 2: Good Night	Deadpool (vol. 6) #7–12	136	August 13, 2019	ISBN 978-1302911737
Volume 3: Weasel Goes to Hell	Deadpool (vol. 6) #13–15, Deadpool Annual #1 (2019)	112	November 12, 2019	ISBN 978-1302914400

=== King Deadpool (2019) by Kelly Thompson ===
Title	Material collected	Pages	Publication Date	ISBN
Volume 1: Hail to the King	Deadpool (vol. 7) #1–6	112	June 23, 2020	ISBN 978-1302921033
Volume 2	Deadpool (vol. 7) #7–10	112	March 16, 2021	ISBN 978-1302921040
King Deadpool By Kelly Thompson	Deadpool (vol. 7) #1–10	256	February 21, 2023	ISBN 978-1302949730

=== Eighth Series (2022) by Alyssa Wong ===
Title	Material collected	Pages	Publication Date	ISBN
Volume 1	Deadpool (vol. 8) #1–5, New Mutants (2018) 30 (Deadpool story)	128	June 6, 2023	ISBN 978-1302930288
Volume 2	Deadpool (vol. 8) #6–10	141	November 21, 2023	ISBN 978-1302930295

=== Ninth Series (2024) by Cody Ziglar ===
Title	Material collected	Pages	Publication Date	ISBN
Blood Bond	Deadpool (vol. 9) #1–5	128	November 26, 2024	ISBN 978-1302958893
The Death of Wade Wilson	Deadpool (vol. 9) #6–10	112	May 2025	ISBN 978-1302958909
Miles Morales: Spider-Man/Deadpool: Pools of Blood	Deadpool (vol. 9) #11–12, Miles Morales: Spider-Man (vol. 2) #30-31	112	November 2025	ISBN 978-1302964924
The Revenge of Wade Wilson	Deadpool (vol. 9) #13–15, Annual 2025	112	December 2025	ISBN 978-1302963392

=== Deadpool Team-Up (2009) ===
Title	Material collected	Pages	Publication Date	ISBN
Volume 1: Good Buddies	Deadpool Team-Up #899–894 and Marvel Spotlight Deadpool	144	December 2010	ISBN 978-0785145295
Volume 2: Special Relationship	Deadpool Team-Up #893–889	192	June 2011	ISBN 978-0785147121
Volume 3: BFF's	Deadpool Team-Up #888–883 and Wolverine/Deadpool: The Decoy #1	168	November 2011	ISBN 978-0785151401
Deadpool Classic Volume 13: Deadpool Team-Up	Deadpool Team-Up #1, Deadpool Team-up #899–883	448	October 2015	ISBN 0-7851-9732-X
Deadpool & Co. Omnibus	Deadpool: Merc With A Mouth #1–13, Lady Deadpool #1, Prelude To Deadpool Corps #1–5, Deadpool Corps #1–12, Deadpool Family #1, Deadpool Team-Up #899–883; Marvel Zombies 4 #1–4 and material from Marvel Zombies 3 #1		January 2018	978-1302910051
Deadpool Team-Up	Deadpool Team-Up (2024) #1-5	120	April 2025	

=== Deadpool Corps (2010) ===
Title	Material collected	Pages	Publication Date	ISBN
Deadpool Corps Prelude	Prelude to Deadpool Corps #1–5	120	January 2011	ISBN 978-0785147527
Volume 1: Pool-pocalypse Now	Deadpool Corps #1–6	168	April 2011	ISBN 978-0785148241
Volume 2: You Say You Want A Revolution	Deadpool Corps #7–12	144	December 2011	ISBN 978-0785148272
Deadpool Classic Volume 12: Deadpool Corps	Deadpool Prelude to Deadpool Corps #1–5, Deadpool Corps #1–12 and Deadpool Family #1	481	August 2015	ISBN 0-7851-9731-1
Deadpool & Co. Omnibus	Deadpool: Merc With A Mouth #1–13, Lady Deadpool #1, Prelude To Deadpool Corps #1–5, Deadpool Corps #1–12, Deadpool Family #1, Deadpool Team-Up #899–883; Marvel Zombies 4 #1–4 and material from Marvel Zombies 3 #1		January 2018	978-1302910051
Deadpool-Verse Deadpool Corps	Deadpool Prelude to Deadpool Corps #1–5, Deadpool Corps #1–12 and Deadpool Family #1	448	November 2023	

=== Deadpool MAX (2010) ===
Title	Material collected	Pages	Publication Date	ISBN
Volume 1: Nutjob	Deadpool Max #1–6	144	December 2011	ISBN 978-0785148517
Volume 2: Involuntary Armageddon	Deadpool Max #7–12	144	December 2011	ISBN 978-0785148531
Volume 3: Second Cut	Deadpool Max II #1–6	176	May 2012	ISBN 978-0785159230
Deadpool MAX Hardcover	Deadpool MAX #1–12, Deadpool MAX #1–6 and Deadpool MAX X-Mas Special		November 2012	978-0785157076

=== Spider-Man/Deadpool (2016) ===
Title	Material collected	Pages	Publication Date	ISBN
Volume 0: Don't Call it a Team-Up	Deadpool (1997) #11, Cable & Deadpool #24, Amazing Spider-Man (1963) #611, Deadpool (2008) #19–21, Avenging Spider-Man #12–13, Deadpool (2012) #10, Deadpool Annual #2	272	May 24, 2016	ISBN 978-1302900847
Volume 1: Isn't It Bromantic	Spider-Man/Deadpool #1–5, 8	136	September 13, 2016	ISBN 978-0785197867
Volume 2: Side Pieces	Spider-Man/Deadpool #1.MU, 6–7, 11–12	120	June 20, 2017	ISBN 978-0785199922
Volume 3: Itsy Bitsy	Spider-Man/Deadpool #9–10, 13–14, 17–18	136	October 3, 2017	ISBN 978-0785197874
Volume 4: Serious Business	Spider-Man/Deadpool #19–22	112	January 16, 2018	ISBN 978-1302908065
Volume 5: Arms Race	Spider-Man/Deadpool #23–28	112	April 24, 2018	ISBN 978-1302910471
Volume 6: WLMD	Spider-Man/Deadpool #29–33	136	July 31, 2018	ISBN 978-1302910488
Volume 7: My Two Dads	Spider-Man/Deadpool #34–39	136	December 11, 2018	ISBN 978-1302910495
Volume 8: Roadtrip	Spider-Man/Deadpool #40–45	136	March 26, 2019	ISBN 978-1302911126
Volume 9: Eventpool	Spider-Man/Deadpool #46–50	112	July 23, 2019	ISBN 978-1302914639
Spider-Man/Deadpool by Joe Kelly & Ed McGuinness	Spider-Man/Deadpool #1–5, 8–10, 13-14, 17-18		March 20, 2018	978-1302903725
Spider-Man/Deadpool Epic Collection Volume 1: Isn't It Bromantic?	Spider-Man/Deadpool #1-14, 17-18, 1.MU		November 2023	
Spider-Man/Deadpool Epic Collection Volume 2: Til Death Do Us	Spider-Man/Deadpool #15-16, 19-32; Deadpool (2015) 28-29; Deadpool and the Mercs for Money #9-10		September 2024	
Spider-Man/Deadpool Epic Collection Volume 3: Road Trip	Spider-Men/Deadpool #33-50		September	

=== Deadpool & the Mercs for Money (2016) ===
Title	Material collected	Pages	Publication Date	ISBN
Volume 0: Merc Madness	Deadpool & the Mercs for Money (vol. 1) #1–5 and Deadpool: Masacre #1	136	August 2016	Paperback: 978-0785192640
Volume 1: Mo' Mercs, Mo' Monkeys	Deadpool & the Mercs for Money (vol. 2) #1–5	112	February 2017	Paperback: 978-1302902636
Volume 2: IvX	Deadpool & the Mercs for Money (vol. 2) #6–8 and Deadpool Annual #1	136	May 2017	Paperback: 978-1302908768
Deadpool Classic Volume 23: Mercs For Money	Deadpool & The Mercs For Money (vol. 1) #1–5, Deadpool & The Mercs For Money (vol. 2) #1–8 and Deadpool: Back In Black #1–5	432	March 2019	ISBN 978-1302916046

=== Other series ===
Title	Material collected	Pages	Publication Date	ISBN
Wolverine/Deadpool: Weapon X	Wolverine #162–166 and Deadpool (vol. 1) #57–60	200	August 2002	ISBN 0-7851-0918-8
Deadpool: Suicide Kings	Deadpool: Suicide Kings #1–5 and Deadpool: Game$ of Death #1	152	April 2010	ISBN 0-7851-4041-7
Deadpool: Merc With a Mouth Volume 1 – Head Trip	Deadpool: Merc With a Mouth #1–13	328	March 2010	ISBN 0-7851-4407-2
Deadpool: Wade Wilson's War	Deadpool: Wade Wilson's War #1–4	104	June 2011	ISBN 0-7851-4585-0
Deadpool Pulp	Deadpool Pulp #1–4	112	August 2011	ISBN 978-0785148715
Deadpool: The Dead-Head Redemption	Deadpool Vol. 3 #900, #1000, Captain America: Who Won't Wield The Shield, and Marvel Digital Holiday Special: Merry Freakin' Christmas	240	June 2011	ISBN 978-0785156499
Deadpool/Amazing Spider-Man/Hulk: Identity Wars	Amazing Spider-Man Annual #38, Deadpool Vol. 2 Annual #1, and Incredible Hulks Annual #1	112	September 2011	ISBN 978-0785155683
Deadpool: All in the Family	Deadpool Family, Cable (vol. 2) #25, and Deadpool and Cable #26	112	September 2011	ISBN 978-0785157830
Fear Itself: Deadpool/Fearsome Four	Fear Itself: Deadpool #1–3, and Fear Itself: Fearsome Four #1–4	168	February 2012	ISBN 978-0785158073
Deadpool Kills the Marvel Universe	Deadpool Kills the Marvel Universe #1–4	96	November 2012	ISBN 978-0785164036
Deadpool Killustrated	Deadpool Killustrated #1–4	96	July 2013	ISBN 978-0785184027
Deadpool Kills Deadpool	Deadpool Kills Deadpool #1–4	96	December 2013	ISBN 978-0785184935
Night of the Living Deadpool	Night of the Living Deadpool #1–4	96	June 2014	ISBN 978-0785190172
Deadpool vs. Carnage	Deadpool vs. Carnage #1–4, Superior Carnage Annual #1	120	September 2014	ISBN 978-1846536137
Deadpool vs. X-Force	Deadpool vs. X-Force #1–4	112	November 2014	ISBN 978-0785154372
Deadpool: Dracula's Gauntlet	Deadpool: Dracula's Gauntlet #1–7	200	November 2014	ISBN 978-1302901219
Deadpool: The Ones with Deadpool	Deadpool Bi-Annual #1, Death of Wolverine: Deadpool & Captain America #1, Deadpool Annual #1–2	128	February 2015	ISBN 978-0785193395
Deadpool vs. Hawkeye	Deadpool vs. Hawkeye #0–4	112	March 2015	ISBN 978-0785193104
Deadpool's Art of War	Deadpool's Art of War #1–4	96	March 2015	ISBN 978-0785190974
Return of the Living Deadpool	Return of the Living Deadpool #1–4	112	July 2015	ISBN 978-0785192572
Deadpool vs. Thanos	Deadpool vs. Thanos #1–4	112	December 2015	978-0785198451
Deadpool's Secret Secret Wars	Deadpool's Secret Secret Wars #1–4	128	January 2016	978-0785198673
Mrs. Deadpool and the Howling Commandos	Mrs. Deadpool and the Howling Commandos #1–4, Werewolf by Night #1	112	May 2016	978-0785198802
Deadpool & Cable: Split Second	Deadpool & Cable: Split Second #1-3	112	May 2016	978-0785195146
Deadpool v Gambit	Deadpool v Gambit #1–5	112	November 2016	978-1302901790
Deadpool: Back in Black	Deadpool: Back in Black #1–5	112	March 2017,	978-1302901882
Deadpool: Too Soon?	Deadpool: Too Soon? #1–4	136	April 2017	978-1302902988
Deadpool the Duck	Deadpool the Duck #1–5	136	June 2017	978-1302904845
Deadpool 2099	Deadpool: World's Greatest #6, 12, 19, 25	112	August 2017	978-1302900922
Deadpool vs. The Punisher	Deadpool vs. The Punisher #1–5	112	September 2017	978-1302907488
Deadpool vs. Old Man Logan	Deadpool vs. Old Man Logan #1–5	112	April 2018	978-1302909178
Deadpool: Assassin	Deadpool: Assassin #1–6	136	November 2018	978-1302911713
Deadpool: Secret Agent Deadpool	Deadpool: Secret Agent Deadpool #1–6	136	Mar 2019	978-1302913434
Black Panther vs Deadpool	Black Panther vs Deadpool #1–5	112	Apr 2019	978-1302915490
Absolute Carnage vs Deadpool	Absolute Carnage Vs. Deadpool (2019) #1–3, Absolute Carnage: Captain Marvel (2019) #1, Ravencroft stinger pages from Captain Marvel (2019) 8, Amazing Spider-Man (2018) 24, Deadpool (2018) 14, Black Cat (2019) 2	112	Jan 2020	978-1302920975
Deadpool: The Saga of Wade Wilson	Deadpool (1997) #3-5, #17-19 and #57-61; Deadpool/Death Annual '98; and Deadpool (2012) #15-19	416	December 2023	
Deadpool: Black, White and Blood	Deadpool: Black, White and Blood #1-4	136	January 2023	
Deadpool: Bad Blood	Deadpool: Bad Blood #1-4	120	September 2022	
Deadpool: Badder Blood	Deadpool: Badder Blood #1-5	144	December 2023	
Deadpool: Bad/Badder Blood	Deadpool: Bad Blood #1-4, Deadpool: Badder Blood #1-5	264	March 2025	
Deadpool/Wolverine: WWIII	Deadpool/Wolverine: WWIII		October 2024	
Venom War: Wolverine/Deadpool	Venom War: Wolverine #1-3, Venom War: Deadpool #1-3, Venom War: Carnage #1-3	200	April 2025	
Deadpool Kills the Marvel Universe One Last Time	Deadpool Kills the Marvel Universe One Last Time #1-5	120	December 2025	
Deadpool/Wolverine: A Time Of Stryfe	Deadpool/Wolverine #1-10	232	March 2026	
Wolverines & Deadpools	Wolverines & Deadpools #1-3, Deadpool/Wolverine: Weapon X-Traction #1, Deadpool vs. Wolverine: Slash 'Em Up #1	152	April 2026	

=== Marvel Omnibus ===
Title	Material collected	Publication Date	ISBN
Deadpool Beginnings Omnibus	New Mutants #98; Deadpool: The Circle Chase #1–4; Deadpool (1994) #1–4; X-Force #2, 11, 15, 47, 56; Nomad #4; Secret Defenders #15–17; Wolverine (1988) #88, 154–155, Heroes for Hire #10–11; Deadpool Team-Up (1998) #1; and material from Avengers (1963) #366, Silver Sable & The Wild Pack #23, and Wolverine Annual '95 and '99	January 2017	978-1302904296
Deadpool and X-Force Omnibus	Deadpool: The Circle Chase #1–4; Deadpool (1994) #1–4; Cable (1993) #1–8; X-Force #19–31, Annual #2; New Warriors (1990) #31; Nomad #20	November 2017	978-1302908300
Deadpool by Joe Kelly Omnibus	Deadpool (1997) #1–33, -1 & 0; Daredevil/Deadpool Annual '97; Deadpool & Death '98; Baby's First Deadpool Book; Amazing Spider-Man #47 & 611; material from Deadpool #900	January 2014	978-0785185604
Deadpool Classic Omnibus Volume 1	Deadpool (1997) #34–69; Black Panther (1998) #23; Agent X #1–15; Fight-Man #1; and material from X-Men Unlimited (1993) #28	January 2016	978-0785196747
Weapon X: The Return Omnibus	Deadpool (1997) #57–60; Wolverine (1988) #162–166, #173–174, #175 (A Story) and #176; Weapon X (2002) #1/2 and #1–28; Weapon X: The Draft — Sauron, Wild Child, Kane, Marrow And Agent Zero; Weapon X: Days Of Future Now #1–5; and material from Deadpool (2012) #27	May 2018	978-1302911829
Cable & Deadpool Omnibus	Cable & Deadpool #1–50; Deadpool/GLI Summer Fun Spectacular; and material from Deadpool (2012) #27	November 2014	978-0785192763
Deadpool by Daniel Way Omnibus Volume 1	Deadpool (2008) #1–26; Wolverine: Origins #21–25, Thunderbolts (1997) #130–131, Hit-Monkey (2010a) #1, Hit-Monkey (2010B) #1–3 and Deadpool Saga	February 2018	978-130291006-8
Deadpool by Daniel Way Omnibus Volume 2	Deadpool (2008) #27–63, #33.1 and #49.1	August 2018	978-1302911416
Deadpool: Merc With a Mouth	Deadpool: Merc With a Mouth #1–13	July 2010	
Deadpool & Co. Omnibus	Deadpool: Merc With A Mouth #1–13, Lady Deadpool #1, Prelude To Deadpool Corps #1–5, Deadpool Corps #1–12, Deadpool Family #1, Deadpool Team-Up #899–883; Marvel Zombies 4 #1–4 and material from Marvel Zombies 3 #1	January 2018	978-1302910051
Deadpool Minibus Volume 0	Deadpool: Suicide Kings #1–5, Deadpool: Wade Wilson's War #1–4, Deadpool Pulp #1–4, Amazing Spider-Man Annual #38, Deadpool Annual (2011) #1, Incredible Hulks Annual #1 and Fear Itself: Deadpool #1–3	March 2018	978-1302910112
Deadpool Minibus Volume 1	Deadpool Kills The Marvel Universe #1–4, Deadpool Killustrated #1–4, Deadpool Kills Deadpool #1–4, Night Of The Living Deadpool #1–4 and Deadpool Vs. Carnage #1–4	October 2014	978-0785190301
Deadpool Minibus Volume 2	Deadpool Vs. X-Force #1–4, Hawkeye Vs. Deadpool #0–4, Deadpool's Art Of War #1–4, Return Of The Living Deadpool #1–4 and Deadpool's Secret Secret Wars #1–4	August 2016	978-1302901974
Deadpool Minibus Volume 3	Mrs. Deadpool And The Howling Commandos #1–4, Deadpool Vs. Thanos #1–4, Deadpool & Cable: Split Second #1–3, Deadpool V Gambit #1–5 and Deadpool: Too Soon? #1–4	March 2019	978-1302915926
Deadpool MAX Hardcover	Deadpool MAX #1–12, Deadpool MAX #1–6 and Deadpool MAX X-Mas Special	November 2012	978-0785157076
Deadpool By Posehn & Duggan Omnibus	Deadpool (2012) #1–45, Deadpool: Dracula's Gauntlet #1–7 and Death Of Wolverine: Deadpool & Captain America #1	December 2016	978-1302902285
Deadpool: World's Greatest Hardcover Volume 1	Deadpool: World's Greatest #1-7 and 3.1: Tres Punto Uno	January 2017	
Deadpool: World's Greatest Hardcover Volume 2	Deadpool: World's Greatest #8-13 and Deadpool: Last Days of Magic	October 2017	
Deadpool: World's Greatest Hardcover Volume 3	Deadpool: World's Greatest #14-20, 22-25; material from Deadpool #21	January 2018	
Deadpool: World's Greatest Hardcover Volume 4	Deadpool: World's Greatest #26–29, Spider-Man/Deadpool #15-16, Deadpool and the Mercs for Money #9-10; material from Deadpool #21	June 2018	
Deadpool: World's Greatest Hardcover Volume 5	Deadpool: World's Greatest #30-37 and Deadpool Secret Comic Variants #1-21	September 2018	
Despicable Deadpool Hardcover	Despicable Deadpool #287-300 and Deadpool Secret Comic Variants #23-25, 30-36	May 2019	
Spider-Man/Deadpool by Joe Kelly & Ed McGuinness	Spider-Man/Deadpool #1–5, 8–10, 13-14, 17-18	March 20, 2018	978-1302903725
