= Outrage (webtoon) =

Webcomic and graphic novel by Fabian Nicieza

- Cover of published edition
- Author: Fabian Nicieza
- Illustrator: Reilly Brown
- Website: Outrage on WEBTOON
- Launch date: September 12, 2018
- End date: December 7, 2022
- Syndicate: Webtoon
- Publisher(s): Rocketship Entertainment; Simon & Schuster
- Genre: Superhero

Outrage is a superhero webcomic series written by Fabian Nicieza and drawn by Reilly Brown, following the story of a mysterious individual who can navigate the Internet and physically manifest at the source of the vile bile that spews throughout social media. The titular "Outrage" appears as a virus that infiltrates the devices of those who choose to be abusive across the internet, pushing his way out of the digital world and into the real world where he proceeds to exact justice on the problematic person.

Originally published via Webtoon for 56 episodes from September 12, 2018 to December 7, 2022, a paperback edition of the webcomic, published by Rocketship Entertainment and distributed by Simon & Schuster, came out on November 29, 2022. Outrage received a positive critical reception, being nominated for the 2023 Ringo Award for Best Webcomic.

== Plot ==
Set in a future only five minutes away, Outrage tells the story of a mysterious individual who can navigate the Internet and physically manifest at the source of the "vile bile" that spews throughout social media as a digital superhero/anti-hero. Armed with an array of weaponry limited by imagination, the A.I. Outrage exacts swift justice on anyone who "outrages" anyone on the Internet, manifesting from their computers or smartphones and comedically beating them to a pulp.

== Collected edition ==
Outrage collections
#	Title	Material collected	Publication date	Pages	Publisher	ISBN
Outrage		Episodes 1–56	November 29, 2022	148	Rocketship Entertainment; Simon & Schuster	978-1952126574
