= Shiklah =

Comic book character

- Shiklah with her pet, Bug.

Publication information
- Publisher: Marvel Comics
- First appearance: Deadpool: The Gauntlet #3 (January 2014)
- Created by: Brian Posehn; Gerry Duggan; Reilly Brown

In-story information
- Species: Succubus
- Place of origin: Earth
- Notable aliases: Queen of the Undead (formerly); Mrs. Deadpool (formerly); Shiklah Wilson (formerly); Mrs. Wilson (formerly); Deadpool's Wife (estranged); Dracula's Wife (currently)
- Abilities: Superhuman strength and speed Enhanced agility, reflexes and endurance Shapeshifting; Mind control Ability to project regular and ethereal flame

Shiklah is a supervillain who appears in American comic books published by Marvel Comics. She was married to Deadpool, but they became estranged, and she married Dracula instead.

== Publication history ==
Shiklah first appeared in the web comic Deadpool: The Gauntlet #3, and was created by writers Brian Posehn and Gerry Duggan and artist Reilly Brown.

== Fictional character biography ==
Shiklah is a succubus who ruled over the monsters of Earth alongside her family before humans existed. Her true form resembles a humanoid bull, but she usually takes the form of a human woman. After his kingdom was conquered by vampires, Shiklah's father sealed her in a coffin until the war had ended or she was to be wed. Deadpool is hired by Dracula to retrieve Shiklah from her coffin so he could marry her and unite the monster world under his rule.

After Shiklah saves Deadpool from being possessed by a ghost, she admits to having feelings for him. Deadpool pushes away her advances due to his worry that things would turn disastrous just like all of his past relationships. After Shiklah and Deadpool return to New York City, they are married in a ceremony officiated by Nightcrawler.

In All-New, All-Different Marvel, Shiklah is shown to have been treating Deadpool with disdain. While watching television in bed with Werewolf by Night and a gorgon, Shiklah tells them that Deadpool is one of her husbands. Deadpool later discovers that Shiklah having an affair with Werewolf by Night. Shiklah is angered that Deadpool is siding with the humans and declares war on the surface world to annex New York. During the war, Shiklah finally ends up marrying Dracula, who proposes to her.

== Powers and abilities ==
As a succubus, Shiklah possesses superhuman physical abilities and is nigh-immortal. She can generate ethereal fire, shapeshift, create dimensional portals, and drain the life force of others.

== Other versions ==
- An alternate universe version of Shiklah from Earth-16356 appears in Deadpool 2099. This version was shrunken and imprisoned in Deadpool's body following a failed attempt to conquer Earth.
- An alternate universe version of Shiklah from Earth-61610 appears in the Secret Wars tie-in Mrs. Deadpool and the Howling Commandos.
