= Mrs. Deadpool and the Howling Commandos =

2015 comic book series

Group publication information
- Publisher: Marvel Comics
- First appearance: Mrs. Deadpool and the Howling Commandos #1 (2015)

In-story information
- Type of organization: Team
- Leader(s): Shiklah

Mrs. Deadpool and the Howling Commandos

Series publication information
- Format: Ongoing series
- Genre: Horror, superhero
- Publication date: 2015
- Number of issues: 4
- Main character(s): Howling Commandos

Mrs. Deadpool and the Howling Commandos is a comic book series published by Marvel Comics.

== Publication history ==
The series was part of the "Secret Wars" event in 2015.

== Plot ==
While her husband Deadpool is dead, Shiklah is engaged to Dracula. In order to find the pieces of the Scepter of the Manticore, Shiklah persuades Dracula to let her go on this quest as he assigns his Howling Commandos (consisting of Frankenstein's Monster, Man-Thing, Marcus the Centaur, N'Kantu, the Living Mummy, Werewolf by Night) to accompany her. When Deadpool's ghost visits her, he possessed the body of Dracula's servant Joshua which enables Shiklah to kill Dracula. Afterwards, Shiklah ignores the warning from Deadpool's ghost of challenging God Emperor Doom. As a result, she and her resistance group get themselves killed by the Thor Corps who have taken notice of what happened in Monster Metropolis.

== Reception ==
The series holds an average rating of 7.2 by five professional critics on the review aggregation website Comic Book Roundup.

Doug Zawisza of CBR.com states that the writer Gerry Duggan brings in the a madcap, anything-goes type of humor into the series that he has previously used in Deadpool and that the series is everything someone would expect from a Duggan Deadpool comic with the added bonus of a lot of monsters.

== Prints ==
=== Issues ===
Issue	Title	Cover date	Comic Book Roundup rating	Estimated sales (first month)	Rated
#1	Warzones!: part 1	August, 2015	6.4 by three professional critics.	48,514, ranked 42nd in North America	PA
#2	Warzones!: part 2	September, 2015	—N/a	36,404, ranked 58th in North America	PA
#3	Warzones!: part 5	October, 2015	7.3 by one professional critic.	31,135, ranked 63rd in North America	PA
#4	Warzones!: part 6	November, 2015	8.0 by one professional critic.	28,966, ranked 62nd in North America	PA

=== Collected editions ===
Title [Tagline]	Format	Material collected	Pages	Publication date	ISBN	Estimated sales (North America)
Mrs. Deadpool and the Howling Commandos	TPB	Mrs. Deadpool and the Howling Commandos #1-4	112	May 3, 2016	0785198806; 978-0785198802	1,756, ranked 60th

== See also ==
- 2015 in comics
