= Milko Bambič =

Milko Bambič (26 April 1905 – 20 May 1991) also known by the nicknames Cvetanov and Banetov, was a prolific illustrator, cartoonist, caricaturist, inventor, children's writer, publicist, and painter from the Slovene minority in Italy (1920-1947). He is regarded as one of the most versatile Slovene artists and a prominent Italian Futurist painter. He published in both Italian and Slovene. He is known for the first Slovene comic strip Little Negro Bu-ci-bu, an allegory of Mussolini's career, and as the creator of the Three Hearts (Tri srca) brand, still used today by Radenska.

== Life ==
Bambič was born in Trieste, where he attended the elementary Cyril and Methodius School with Slovene language as language of instruction, located in Sveti Ivan, Trieste. Then, he was a pupil at the one-year German preparatory school and in the first class of the German technical high school in Trieste. In 1919, he attended the brothers Rendićs's private school, and then the Idrija Technical High School, where he got acquainted with modern art movements by the Lojze Spazzapan, a Slovene-Italian modernist painter, who at the time served in Idrija as a math and drawing teacher. Babič became the leading illustrator of Slovene press in Trieste. He was prevented by the fascists to enter the Accademia di Belle Arti in Venice in late 1920s. In 1927, he participated in an underground exhibition of Slovene Trieste artists, forbidden by the Italian Fascist government.

Bambič published his children's story on Buci-Bu, a black king who with his false wisdom leads his people to ruin. Because the Italian Fascist authorities recognised the message as politically motivated, Bambič had to leave Trieste for Yugoslavia to avoid arrest. In that year, he moved to Ljubljana, where he undertook the study of architecture, but did not finish it. In 1929, he moved to Zagreb, where he ran a graphics company and published an art review. In 1931, he designed the Three Hearts (Slovene: Tri srca) brand for Radenska. In 1932, he attended art history courses in Ljubljana. In 1935, the Mladinska matica publishing house awarded his youth picture book King Honolulu (Slovene: Kralj Honolulu). He returned to Trieste in 1943, after the capitulation of Italy, and lived there until his death. Only in 1959 did he create his second comic. He was bestowed with the Marcello Mascherini Award in 1975, and in 1978 held an exhibition in the Sežana library that raised interest in him in Slovene circles. In 1980, he had a retrospective exhibition in Villa Opicina, and a large exhibition in Trieste in 1985.

== Work ==
Overall, Bambič illustrated over 70 books, among them the poem collection Tičistan by Aleš Debeljak. In addition to his comic strips and caricatures, he also produced the first Slovene youth book in colour lithography, St. Nicholas's Night, written by Josip Ribičič. He spoke nine languages and translated poems, for example by Russian poet Alexander Blok and Italian poet Michelle Chaunier, with some work published. He held seven patents in different European countries. For the major part of his life, he was very connected with his home town of Trieste, where he was the leading Slovene illustrator. He also wrote and illustrated children's literature. His painting was based on Vienna Secession and Slovene Impressionism. His caricatures and illustrations have been described as light, innovative, humorous and anecdotal. In the Italian press, he was a valued art critic and also published articles about art, education, technology, national issues and other topics. On the hundredth anniversary of his birth, a conference and three exhibitions of his work were organised.
