= Little Negro Bu-ci-bu =

Slovenian comic strip

Bu-ci-bu's Birth. Milko Bambič, 1927, Naš glas 3(9), p. 289

Little Negro Bu-ci-bu (Slovene: Zamorček Bu-ci-bu), also mentioned as Buci-Bu, was the first Slovene comic strip. It was created by Milko Bambič and published in 1927 in the children's column of the monthly Naš glas (Our Voice) in Trieste. It is a story about an arrogant and tyrannical black king that with his false wisdom leads his people to ruin and commits suicide. It caused a controversy, because it was seen as a parody on the Italian leader Mussolini, and the author predicted his demise. The Italian Fascist authorities forbade Bambič's works. He escaped from Trieste to Yugoslavia to avoid arrest.
