= NFL SuperPro =

Comic book series published by Marvel

Publication information
- Publisher: Marvel Comics
- Format: Ongoing series
- Genre: Superhero
- Publication date: 1991 - 1992
- No. of issues: 12 + 1 Special
- Main character: Phillip "Phil" Grayfield

Creative team
- Written by: Fabian Nicieza
- Artist: Jose Delbo

NFL SuperPro is a comic book series published by Marvel Comics, centered on Phillip "Phil" Grayfield, an ex-National Football League (NFL) player who survives a freak accident and wears a near-indestructible football uniform. Produced in collaboration with the NFL and originally written by Fabian Nicieza and artist Jose Delbo, the series started publication in 1991 and ended after 12 issues.

== Outline ==
Nicieza wrote a story centering on Phil Grayfield, once an aspiring football player. His career ended when he saved a child from falling and suffered a horrific knee injury. He became a sports reporter and interviewed an eccentric football superfan, who also happened to be a scientist. This scientist designed a new, almost indestructible football uniform, which has to be molded on an individual basis and costs five million dollars to construct — so it is worth a fortune.

Suddenly interrupting the interview, thieves raid the superfan's house, overwhelm the two of them, steal a van load of NFL merchandise (but not the uniform), and torch the building. Grayfield, who is tied up and helpless, knocks over experimental chemicals, which — in combination with the fire and ultra-rare football souvenirs going up in flames — do not incinerate him, but turn him into a near-invincible superhero.

Grayfield puts on the superfan's football uniform and brings the villains to justice, dedicating his life to fighting crime and dubbing himself "SuperPro".

== Publication history ==
The first issue starring NFL SuperPro was "NFL SuperPro Special Edition # 1", cover-dated March 1991. The series began with issue "NFL SuperPro # 1" (cover-date October 1991) and ended with "NFL SuperPro # 12" (cover-date September 1992). On two occasions, NFL SuperPro featured a crossover, a common practice in comic books to boost sales; Spider-Man (in issue # 1) and Captain America (in issue # 8).

The character NFL SuperPro has not been seen since the series' cancellation. Writer Robert Kirkman reportedly wanted to use SuperPro in an issue of Marvel Team-Up, but was prevented by copyright issues concerns.

== Reception ==
NFL SuperPro has been called one of the worst comics in recent Marvel Comics history, becoming a cult object. Often cited in this claim are issues with the plot and the characters. For example, in the first issue a group of thieves incinerate valuable NFL merchandise but it is never explained why they burn it instead of selling it off. Writer Fabian Nicieza has admitted he wrote the story to gain free NFL tickets. He stated that he still receives flak for the comic.

Nicieza left SuperPro after four issues and was replaced with Buzz Dixon; one of Dixon's issues, issue 6, featured Hopi villains, drew substantial complaints from Hopi representatives, leading Marvel to recall the comic. Dixon left Superpro after three issues.

In 2005, the Chicago Sports Review called it "perhaps the worst comic book ever created".

== Supporting characters ==
- Ken Reid - Ken Reid, a cameraman, accompanies SuperPro's alter ego, Phil Grayfield, to his interviews and is therefore always present to film NFL SuperPro in action. Over time, he becomes Phil's confidant.
- Jane Dixon - SuperPro's former girlfriend, and only other person to know his secret identity.
- Protectors of the Forest - Defenders of the Brazilian rainforest.
- Repulsor - An armor-wielding ex football player.
- Felicita Oliveri
- The Happy Campers - A superhero team with four members: The Almighty Dollar (with the ability to shoot pennies out of his hands), Streak (who has super speed), Girth (who can hit people with his belly), and Calculator (who can do equations super quickly in his head).

== Villains ==
- Sanction - Crime boss Marco Sanzionare, whose dealings are constantly thwarted by SuperPro
- Carl Jennings - A former football player that used an experimental form of steroids
- Quick Kick - A field-goal kicker turned evil ninja, who appears in #2 of the series
- Instant Replay - An assassin with the ability to travel short distances through time
- Carragone - A man who owns a camp to “find your inner hero” but is really trying to figure out how to give people superpowers

== In other media ==
Phil Grayfield appears in Your Friendly Neighborhood Spider-Man, voiced by Roger Craig Smith. This version is a high school football coach for Rockford T. Bales High School.

== See also ==
- Kickers, Inc.
