= Fabian Nicieza =

Argentine-American comic book writer and editor (born 1961)

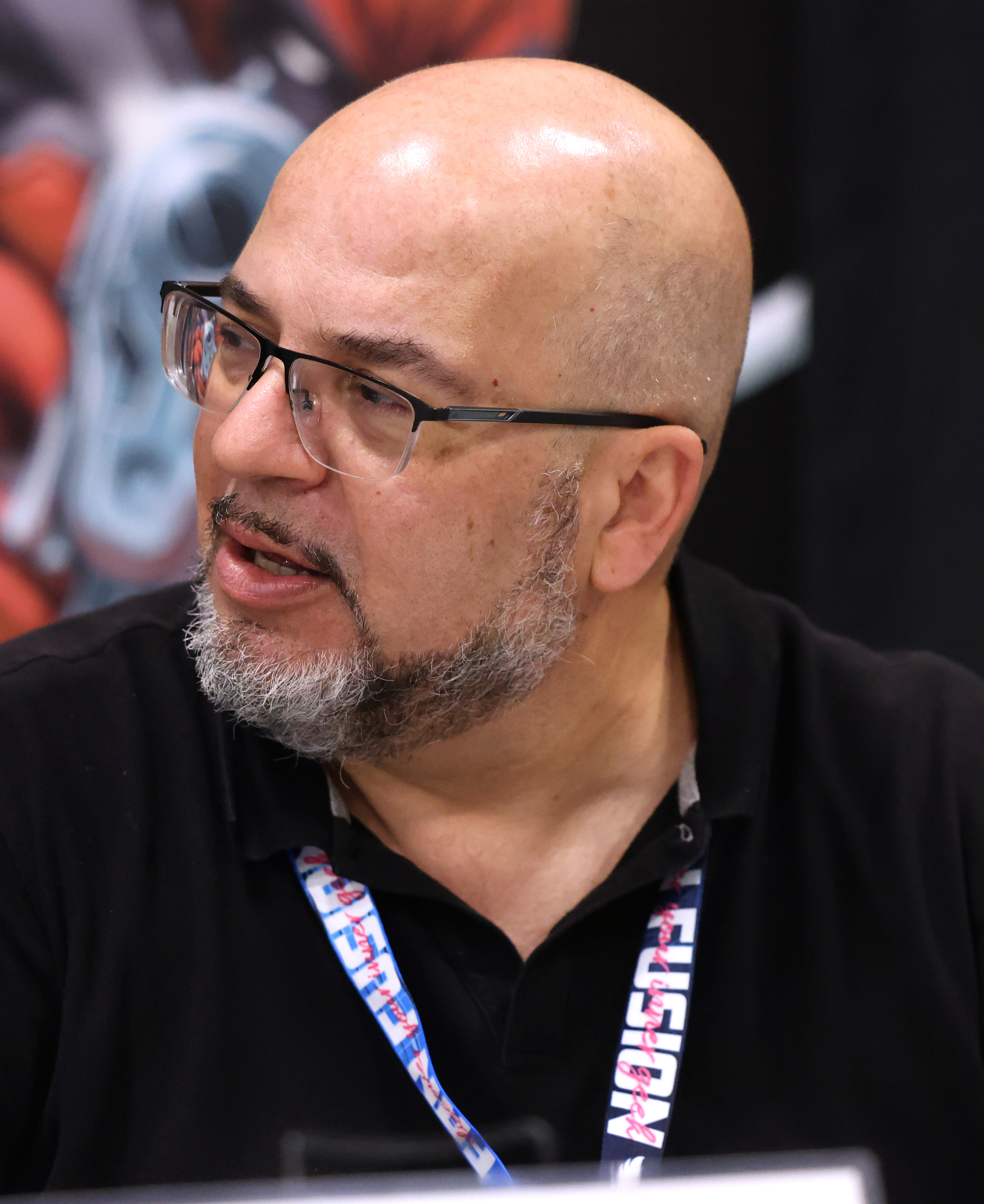
- Nicieza in 2025
- Born: December 31, 1961 (age 64) Buenos Aires, Argentina
- Areas: Writer, Editor
- Notable works: New Warriors; Thunderbolts; Nomad; X-Men; X-Force; Gambit; Deadpool; Cable & Deadpool; Outrage

Fabian Nicieza (/niːsiˈɛsə/; December 31, 1961) is an Argentine-American comic book writer and editor who is best known for his work on Marvel titles such as X-Men, X-Force, New Warriors, Nomad, Cable, Gambit, Deadpool and Thunderbolts, for all of which he helped create numerous characters, among them Adam X, Deadpool, Domino, Feral, G. W. Bridge, Kwannon, Shatterstar, and Silhouette. He also created and wrote the WEBTOON series Outrage.

== Early life ==
Nicieza was born in Buenos Aires, Argentina, the son of Omar and Irma Riguetti Nicieza. He was four years old when his family moved to the United States. Growing up in New Jersey, Nicieza learned to read and write from comic books. He lived first in Sayreville, New Jersey and moved to Old Bridge Township, where he attended Madison Central High School, from which he graduated in 1979. He studied at Rutgers University, interning at the ABC television network before graduating in 1983 with a degree in advertising and public relations. His brother is Mariano Nicieza, also a comic book writer and editor.

== Career ==
Until 1985, Nicieza worked for the Berkley Publishing Group, starting in the production department and becoming a managing editor.

=== Marvel Comics ===
In 1985, Nicieza joined the staff at Marvel Comics, initially as a manufacturing assistant, later moving to the promotions department as an advertising manager. During this period he began to take his first freelance work for Marvel, writing short articles for Marvel's promotional magazine Marvel Age.

Nicieza's first published comics story came with Psi-Force No. 9 (July 1987), a title in Marvel's short-lived New Universe imprint. This led to his becoming that title's regular writer from #16 (Feb. 1988) until #32 (June 1989), the final issue. This led to fill-in work on titles such as Classic X-Men, for which he provided backup stories, and in the Marvel Annuals' 1989 summer crossover "Atlantis Attacks".

After Tom DeFalco, then Marvel's editor-in-chief, created the superhero team the New Warriors, using existing characters, in Thor No. 412 (Dec. 1989), he selected Nicieza to write the spin-off series. Nicieza recalled, "I took the assignment for two reasons. First, I saw a lot of potential in these characters that had already been deemed useless. And secondly, I really wanted to write a monthly book." Collaborating with pencilers Mark Bagley and later Darick Robertson, primarily, Nicieza went on to write the title for most of its first 53 issues (July 1990 – November 1994). Years later, Nicieza said that he considers the first 25 issues of New Warriors to be the best work of his career.

Also in 1990 Nicieza began short runs on comics such as Alpha Flight (#87–101), Avengers (#317–325) and Avengers Spotlight, as well as the miniseries Nomad, which in turn led him to write the ongoing series Nomad vol. 2 in 1992. That year, Nicieza became editor of Marvel's children's imprint, Star Comics. Shortly afterward, he left the Marvel staff and began freelance writing for the company.

Nicieza's projects in this period included the first four issues of National Football League-approved superhero NFL SuperPro (Oct. 1991 – Feb. 1992), and, with penciler Kevin Maguire, the four-issue miniseries Adventures of Captain America (also known by its cover-logo treatment, The Adventures of Captain America: Sentinel of Liberty) (Sept. 1991 – Jan. 1992), an origin-story retelling set in the 1940s.

=== The X-Men ===
In 1991, Nicieza joined with artist Rob Liefeld in co-plotting and writing the final three issues of the New Mutants. In those issues Liefeld and Nicieza created the characters Deadpool and Shatterstar as well as the super team, X-Force. Liefeld and Nicieza then produced an ongoing X-Force title. Nicieza initially worked on the title as scripter. After the departure of Liefeld in No. 12, Nicieza became the title's full writer, which he remained until 1995. By the end of 1992, Nicieza became regular scripter for X-Men vol. 2, beginning with No. 12 (Sept. 1992), working primarily with penciler Andy Kubert throughout his run. For the next three years, Nicieza was among the writers and editors of one of Marvel's most popular superhero franchises during a time of such popular, multi-series crossover story arcs as "X-Cutioner's Song", "Phalanx Covenant" and "Age of Apocalypse".

During this period Nicieza wrote the first Cable miniseries as well as the first few issues of the character's subsequent ongoing series. He also wrote the first solo Deadpool series, Deadpool: the Circle Chase in 1993. These series expanded the characters' personalities and established key background information for both characters, all things which were later used by other writers on those characters' subsequent ongoing books.

However, in 1995, in a dispute with then editor-in-chief Bob Harras over the future direction of his plotlines on X-Force, Nicieza was fired from the X-titles, leaving X-Force with No. 43 and X-Men with No. 45. He later remarked, "I never wanted to leave [X-Force], and never felt my firing was justified. ... I don't recall being given a reason [for being fired], and I also don't recall asking for one. ... Considering it was a Top 10 selling title at the time, I felt it was a wholly unjustified decision."

=== Acclaim Comics ===
After 1995, Nicieza wrote short runs of Captain Marvel (vol. 2, 1995), Spider-Man: The Final Adventure (1995) and stories for Mighty Morphin Power Rangers before leaving the company in 1996. That year Nicieza did his first work for rival publisher DC Comics, co-writing Justice League: Midsummer Nightmare with Mark Waid which relaunched the Justice League as the JLA. He also worked for Twist and Shout Comics writing and pencilling back-up stories in X-Flies Special #1 and Dirtbag #7.

Later in 1996 Nicieza joined Acclaim Comics as senior vice-president and editor-in-chief. He was charged with revamping the companies intellectual properties which had previously formed Valiant Comics' Valiant Universe. Nicieza as editor oversaw the new version, dubbed "VH2", which re-imagined characters such as Solar, X-O Manowar, and Ninjak.

Nicieza himself wrote the Turok title as well as a new series, Troublemakers. Turok met with success as a video game adaptation, and Nicieza was promoted to president and publisher of Acclaim Comics in 1997. He also wrote a Turok novella during this period. However, after staff cuts and most of the lines' cancellation, Nicieza left Acclaim in 1999.

=== Freelance work ===
Returning to freelance work, Marvel and the X-Men, Nicieza co-wrote the Magneto Wars crossover through Uncanny X-Men #366–367 and X-Men vol. 2, #86–87, with artist Alan Davis in 1999. This led to the successive Magneto limited series Magneto Rex (1999) and Magneto: Dark Seduction (2000), as well as an ongoing Gambit (1998) series which he wrote for the first 24 issues of its 25-issue run.

Also in 1999, Nicieza began writing Thunderbolts with #34. He continued to write the book (initially with old partner Mark Bagley on art, later with Patrick Zircher and Chris Batista) up until No. 75 when the title was revamped. The revamp was unsuccessful, and in 2004 the original version of the team was resurrected, initially in an Avengers/Thunderbolts miniseries, then later in the New Thunderbolts series with Nicieza again as writer.

Nicieza also worked on several limited series at Marvel and DC around the turn of the century. At Marvel he wrote Citizen V (2001), Citizen V and the V Battalion: Everlasting (2002), X-Men Forever (2001), and X-Force vol. 2, as well as the short-lived ongoing series Hawkeye (2003); while at DC, he wrote the six-issue miniseries Supermen of America (1999) and the Elseworlds project JLA: Created Equal (2000), as well as some issues of the children's comic Justice League Adventures.

In 2003 Nicieza co-created, with artist Stefano Raffaele, the horror miniseries The Blackburne Covenant, published by Dark Horse Comics. That same year he returned to two of his old characters with the Marvel series Cable and Deadpool, of which he wrote all 50 issues.

In 2006, Nicieza returned to DC with a three-issue arc in Action Comics #841–843 (July–Sept. 2006), co-written with Kurt Busiek. Nicieza also wrote JSA Classified #28 (September 2007). He is also one of the co-writers for The 99, an "Islamic culture-based comic book" with Kuwaiti Naif Al-Mutawa, Other late-2000s DC work includes Nightwing and Robin, both titles being cancelled in connection with "Batman R.I.P." and Nicieza then wrote an Azrael : Death's Dark Knight mini-series, part of the Battle for the Cowl storyline which dealt with the "Batman R.I.P." aftermath. After Death's Dark Knight concluded, Nicieza wrote the new Azrael ongoing series from issue #1–13 (December 2009 – December 2010).

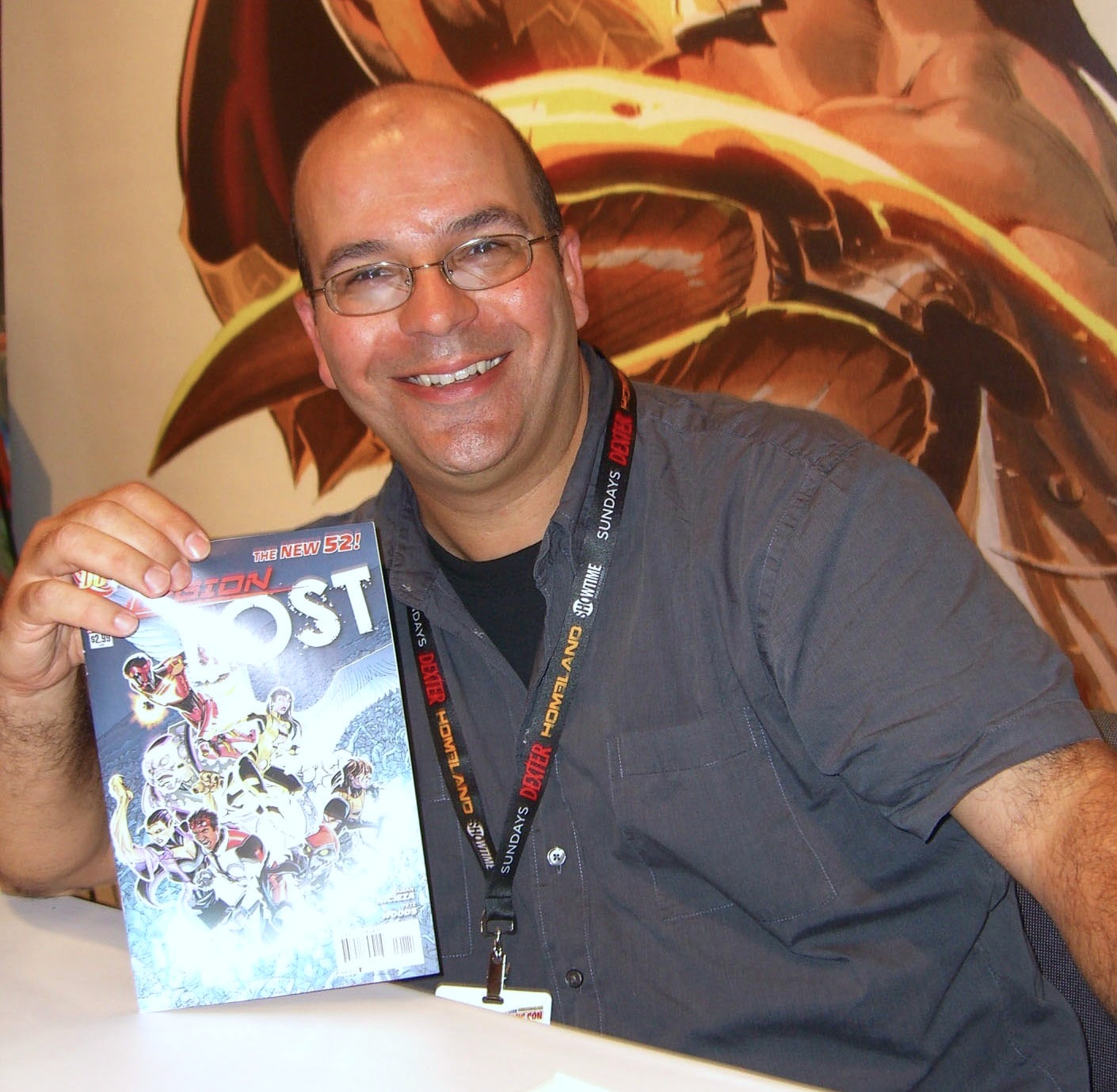
Nicieza at the 2011 New York Comic Con

Nicieza began writing the DC series Red Robin from issues #13-26, the final issue (Aug. 2010 - Aug. 2011). DC announced Nicieza would be writing Legion Lost, a spinoff of Legion of Superheroes as part of DC's line wide relaunch initiative in September 2011. Nicieza wrote the first six issues before leaving the title. In 2016, for the comics company Shatner Singularity, he adapted a Stan Lee poem into the graphic novel Stan Lee's 'God Woke'. That work won the 2017 Independent Publisher Book Awards' Outstanding Books of the Year Independent Voice Award.

In 2023, it was announced that Nicieza would be returning to the X-Men line of books to write the fifth volume of Cable, as a four-issue mini-series beginning in January, 2024.

=== Non-comics work ===
In non-comics works, Nicieza co-scripted the direct-to-DVD animated feature Hot Wheels World Race, and the animated DVD feature The Black Belt Club, based on the Scholastic book series. In 2021, Nicieza created and executive produced the animated streaming series Superhero Kindergarten, based on the comic book series of the same name by Stan Lee. In 2021, Nicieza's first non-comic book was released: Suburban Dicks, a satirical crime novel set in the New Jersey suburbs. A second book with the same characters, The Self-Made Widow, was published in 2022.

== Bibliography ==
The following is a partial bibliography of Nicieza's work as a writer and editor in comics and other media.

=== As writer ===
==== Acclaim Comics ====
- X-Flies Special #1
- Dirtbag #7
- Turok #1-4

==== DC Comics ====
- Action Comics:
  - Action Comics #841–843
  - "Family" (co-written by Nicieza , Kurt Busiek and Geoff Johns, art by Renato Guedes, in #850, 2006)
- Adventures of Superman #14
- Azrael #1–9
- Azrael: Death's Dark Knight #1-3
- Batman:
  - Batman #703, 713, Annual #27
  - Batman: Battle for the Cowl: Gotham Gazette - Batman Alive?
  - Batman: Battle for the Cowl: Gotham Gazette - Batman Dead?
  - Batman: Battle for the Cowl - The Network #1
  - Batman: Streets of Gotham #17-18
- Batwing #15-18
- Bruce Wayne: The Road Home - Batman and Robin
- Bruce Wayne: The Road Home - Ra's al Ghul
- Bruce Wayne: The Road Home - Red Robin
- Convergence: Superboy #1–2
- Convergence: Titans #1–2
- DC Universe Presents #12
- Detective Comics Annual #11
- JSA Classified #28
- Justice League Adventures #3, 24
- Justice League of America:
  - Convergence: Justice League of America #1–2
  - JLA 80-Page Giant #2
  - JLA: Created Equal #1-2
  - Justice League of America/The 99 #1-6
  - Justice League: A Midsummer's Nightmare #1–3 (co-written by Nicieza and Mark Waid, art by Jeff Johnson and Darick Robertson, 1996) collected as JLA: A Midsummer's Nightmare (tpb, 128 pages, 1996, ISBN 1-56389-338-X; hc, 2017, ISBN 1-4012-7432-3)
- Legion Lost #1-6
- Nightwing #138-139
- Nightwing #51-56
- Superman:
  - Superman #659, Annual #13
  - Superman Annual #1
  - Supermen of America #1-6
- Robin #175-183
- Red Robin #13-26
- Teen Titans #11-17
- Trinity #1-52

==== Marvel Comics ====
- Adventures of Captain America #1-4
- Age of Apocalypse #1–5
- Alpha Flight #87–101
- Alpha Flight Special #1-2, 4
- Amazing Spider-Man Annual '96
- Amazing X-Men #1-4 (1995)
- Avengers #317–324, 341-342, Annual #18
- Avengers Alliance #1-4
- Avengers Spotlight #24, 31-34
- Avengers / Thunderbolts #1-5
- Avengers West Coast #58, Annual #4
- Bill & Ted's Bogus Journey: A Most Excellent Movie Adaptation
- Black Panther: Soul of a Machine #1, 4-5, 8
- Blood Hunters #4
- Cable:
  - Cable (Vol. 1) #1-10
  - Cable (Vol. 5) #1-4
  - Cable: Blood & Metal #1-2
  - Cable & Deadpool #1–50
- Captain Marvel #1-6
- Captain Marvel #14
- Citizen V (2001)
- Citizen V and the V Battalion: Everlasting (2002)
- Codename: Spitfire #11
- Daredevil #258
- Deadpool:
  - Deadpool #27
  - Deadpool & Cable: Split Second #1-3
  - Deadpool Nerdy 30 #1
- Domino Annual #1
- Fantastic Four #50
- Gambit #1-24, Annual 1999-2000
- Gambit and the X-Ternals #1-4
- Giant-Size Fantastic Four #1
- Godzilla vs. X-Men #1
- Hawkeye (vol. 3) #1-8
- Hulk:
  - Incredible Hulk (vol. 2) #29
  - Incredible Hulk vs. The Mighty Thor: New York Jets Exclusive
- Iron Man #255, Annual #10
- Justice #26, 28-29, 31
- Justice: Four Balance #1-4
- Love Unlimited Infinity Comic #37-42
- Magneto Rex
- Magneto: Dark Seduction #1-4
- Marvel Comics Presents #14-15, 19-20, 23, 35, 42, 46, 51-53, 72, 83, 107, 122, 159-164
- Marvel Comics #1001
- New Mutants #91, 98-100, Annual #7
- New Thunderbolts #1-18
- New Warriors #1-53, Annual #1-4
- NFL SuperPro #1-7
- Night Thrasher #1-12
- Night Thrasher: Four Control #1-4
- Nomad #1-4
- Nomad (Vol. 2) #1-20, 22-25
- Nova #1-7
- Psi-Force #9, 16-32
- Secret Empire: Brave New World #2
- Silver Sable and the Wild Pack #13
- Solo Avengers #15
- Soviet Super Soldiers
- Spider-Man:
  - Spider-Man: Lifeline #1-3
  - Spider-Man: The Final Adventure #1-4
  - Spider-Man Unlimited #11
- Stryfe's Strike File
- Thunderbolts #34-75, #100-109, Annual 2000
- Thunderbolts: Life Sentences
- X-Men:
  - Uncanny X-Men #279-280, #366–367
  - X-Men (vol. 2) #12-45, #86–87
  - X-Force #1-43, Annual #1-3, Annual '99
  - X-Men Forever #1-6
  - X-Men Legends #1-2, 10
  - X-Men: Magneto War #1
  - X-Men Prime

==== Teshkeel Comics ====
- The 99 #0, 4-5, 8-12
- The 99: First Light #1

==== Other ====
- 22 Brides #1-4
- Outrage
- Star Wars Tales #13
- The Blackburne Covenant #1-4

==== As editor ====
- ALF #34-50
- Barbie #1-18
- Barbie Fashion #1-17
- Double Dragon #1-6
- Hellstorm: Prince of Lies #1-11
- Killer Instinct #2
- Mad-Dog #1-2, 6
- Marvel Age #92, 111
