= Dead pool (disambiguation) =

A dead pool is a game in which the object is guessing when someone will die.

Dead Pool, Deadpool or Deathpool may also refer to:

== Engineering ==
- The point at which a reservoir no longer has enough water to flow downstream of its dam; see List of reservoirs by volume § Terminology

== Media ==
- The Dead Pool (1988), last of the Dirty Harry series of films starring Clint Eastwood
- "The Dead Pool", a 2018 episode of the animated web series The Villain Pub
- Dead Pool (professional wrestling), a faction set up for World Championship Wrestling
- The Dead Pool, a stage in Mortal Kombat II

=== Marvel Comics ===
- Deadpool, a character in the Marvel Comics universe
  - Deadpool (comic book), multiple comic book titles featuring the Deadpool character
  - Several comic books by this name featuring this character, see List of Deadpool titles
  - Deadpool (video game), a 2013 video game
  - Deadpool (film), a 2016 superhero film
  - Deadpool (TV series), an unproduced TV series
- Deathpool, alias of Eleanor Camacho, the daughter of Deadpool and Carmelita Camacho

== See also ==
- "Death Pool 100", episode of fifth season of CSI: Miami
- Tontine, sometimes erroneously known as a deathpool or dead pool
- Wade Wilson (criminal), nicknamed the "Deadpool Killer"
