= Alvin Lee (comics) =

Canadian comic book artist

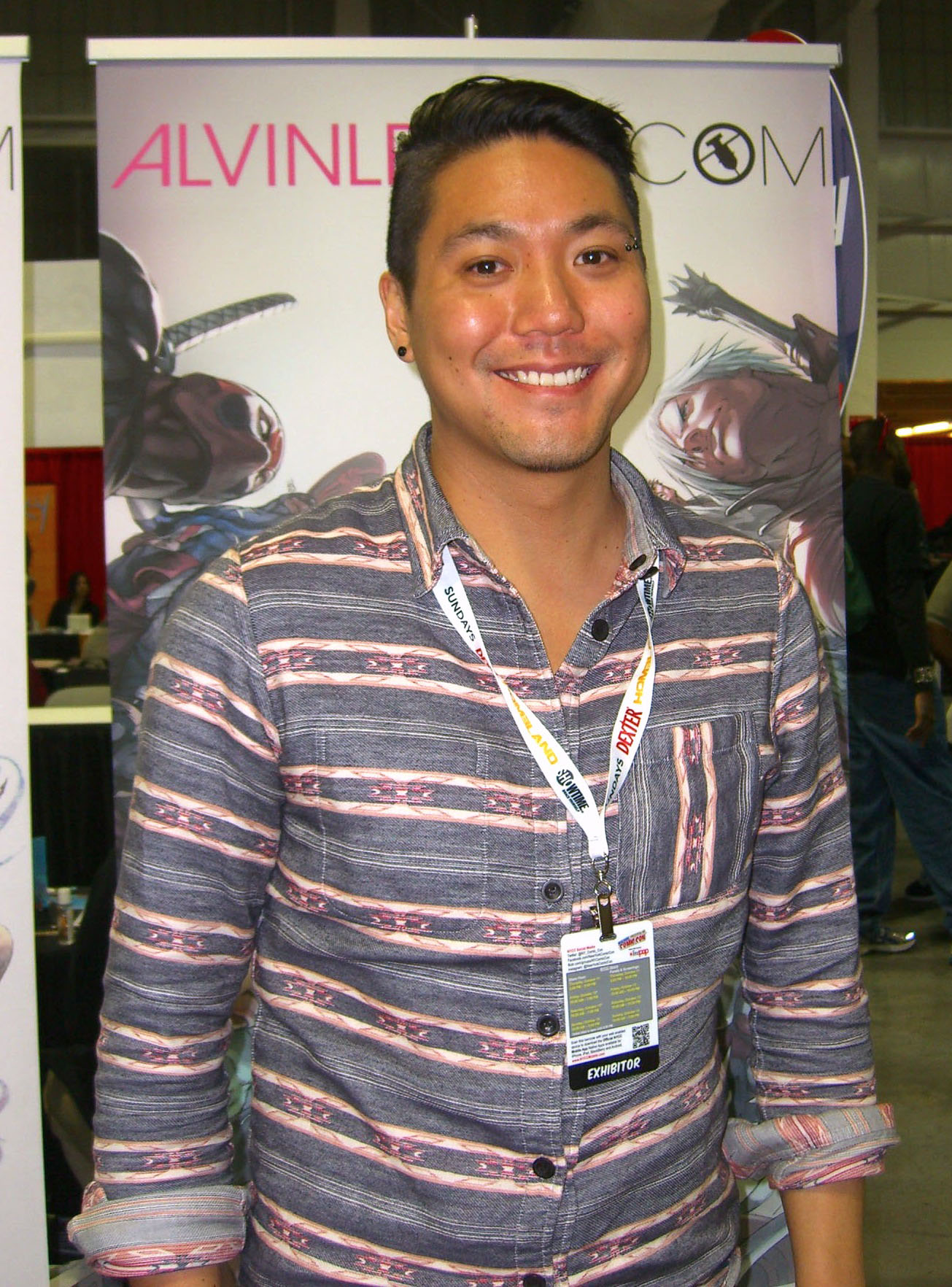
- Lee at the 2012 New York Comic Con
- Born: Windsor, Ontario
- Areas: Penciller, Inker
- Notable works: Street Fighter comics Agent X

Alvin Lee is a Canadian comic book artist known for his manga-styled art. Lee is the co-creator, along with writer Gail Simone of the character Agent X.

Lee has worked under major comic book publishers including Image Comics under the UDON label, UDON studios as an independent publisher, Marvel Comics, DC Comics and Wildstorm Productions.

== Career ==
Alvin Lee started his comic book career at 17, working as a comic book inker, mostly for Pat Lee's art, and was co-founder of now defunct Dreamwave Productions. Lee worked on titles such as Dark Minds, Neon Cyber, and Warlands. His first comic as penciller was for Warlands: Banished Knights.

In 2001, Lee joined UDON as a lead artist with the revival of Capcom's Street Fighter comic books and Darkstalkers comic books. His talent has also led to the game art of two Capcom video game titles, Capcom Fighting Evolution and the re-release of Super Street Fighter II Turbo HD Remix. UDON was also an independent publisher and worked as a contract studio releasing a few of Marvel & Wildstorm titles, Alvin was responsible for the Deadpool/Agent X redesign and Taskmaster's new costume design in 2002. He also worked on Marvel Mangaverse: Avengers Assemble! #1, X-Men: Age of Apocalypse, Fantastic Four (vol. 3) #50 and Wildstorm's Gen 13 #7.

Lee left the UDON Entertainment group as of mid-2007, and has worked with Marvel since. Most recently, Alvin has released Marvel's Heroes for Hire issues #14 & 15, filling in for Marvel penciller Clay Mann.

In September 2010, Lee re-teamed with his former Deadpool and Agent X writer Gail Simone for a run on Birds of Prey at DC Comics.

Recently, Lee has joined Riot Games as a Principal Artist.
