= Warland =

Warland may refer to:

- Betsy Warland, a Canadian writer and poet
- Ben Warland, an Australian professional footballer
- Dale Warland (born 1932), an American conductor and composer
- Warland, a hamlet in the South Pennines, England, on the border of Yorkshire and Greater Manchester

== See also ==
- Warlands
