= Deadpool in other media =

Adaptations of the Marvel character

Adaptations of Deadpool in other media
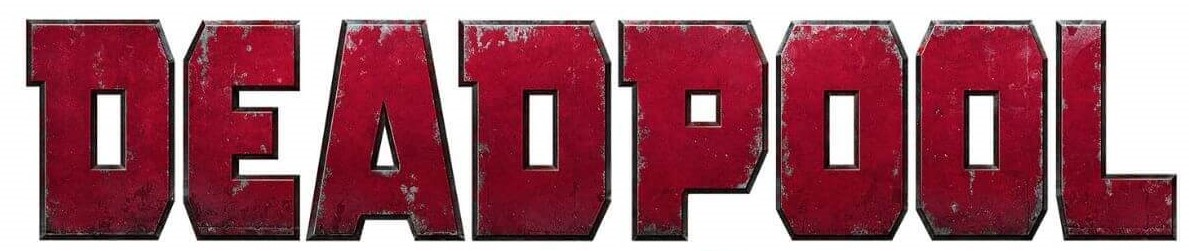
- Original source: Comics published by Marvel Comics
- First appearance: The New Mutants #98 (December 1990)

Films and television
- Film(s): Hulk Vs Wolverine (2009); X-Men Origins: Wolverine (2009); Deadpool (2016); Deadpool 2 (2018); Deadpool & Wolverine (2024)
- Television show(s): Marvel Superheroes: What the--?! (2010–14); Ultimate Spider-Man (2013); Marvel Disk Wars: The Avengers (2014); Marvel Future Avengers (2017); Lego Marvel Avengers: Mission Demolition (2024)

Games
- Video game(s): X-Men Legends II: Rise of Apocalypse; Marvel: Ultimate Alliance; Marvel Trading Card Game; X-Men Origins: Wolverine; Marvel: Ultimate Alliance 2 Marvel Pinball; Pinball FX2; Spider-Man: Shattered Dimensions; Marvel vs. Capcom 3: Fate of Two Worlds; Ultimate Marvel vs. Capcom 3 Marvel Super Hero Squad Online; Marvel Avengers Alliance; Marvel War of Heroes; Marvel Heroes; Deadpool; Lego Marvel Super Heroes; Marvel Puzzle Quest; Marvel Contest of Champions; Disk Wars Avengers: Ultimate Heroes; Marvel: Future Fight; X-Men: Battle of the Atom; Pinball FX 3 Deadpool; Marvel Powers United VR; Marvel Strike Force; Marvel Ultimate Alliance 3: The Black Order; Marvel Snap; Marvel Super War; Marvel Realm of Champions; Marvel Future Revolution; Marvel's Midnight Suns; Marvel's Deadpool VR

The Marvel Comics character Deadpool has appeared in various other media since his debut in The New Mutants #98 (December 1990). Deadpool has been the focus of various animated series and video games. The character made its live-action film debut in X-Men Origins: Wolverine (2009), portrayed by Ryan Reynolds. A Deadpool live-action feature film also starring Reynolds and directed by Tim Miller was released in 2016, with Reynolds also appearing as the character in the two sequels Deadpool 2 (2018) and Deadpool & Wolverine (2024).

== Television ==
- Deadpool makes non-speaking cameo appearances in X-Men: The Animated Series and its sequel show X-Men '97.
- Deadpool makes a cameo appearance in the Marvel Anime: X-Men episode "Destiny – Bond".
- Deadpool appears in Marvel Superheroes: What the--?! (2010–14).
- Deadpool appears in the Ultimate Spider-Man episode "Ultimate Deadpool", voiced by Will Friedle. This version is an orphan who Nick Fury took in as a child and trained to become a hero. However, Deadpool left Fury to become a mercenary, deciding it was easier to do so than living according to moral ideas and a conscience. Believing he was a freelance hero, Spider-Man joins forces with Deadpool to stop Taskmaster after he acquires sensitive S.H.I.E.L.D. data, only for the web-slinger to fight Deadpool as well after discovering the latter's willingness to kill. The episode is also notable for coining the term "unalive", used by Deadpool as a stand-in for "kill", and later adopted by mainstream social media over the 2020s.
- Deadpool appears in Marvel Disk Wars: The Avengers, voiced by Takehito Koyasu in Japanese and Jason Spisak in English.
- In May 2017, FXX placed a series order for a Deadpool animated series with Donald and Stephen Glover as showrunners, executive producers, and writers for the series. In late March 2018 however, it was announced that FXX would not move forward with the series due to creative differences. Stephen later admitted that the "creative difference" in question involved an episode revolving around Taylor Swift, which FXX stated was the "last straw".
- Deadpool appears in Marvel Future Avengers, voiced again by Takehito Koyasu in Japanese and Jason Spisak in English.
- Deadpool appears in Lego Marvel Avengers: Mission Demolition, voiced by Jason Mantzoukas.

== Film ==
=== Animation ===
- Deadpool appears in Hulk Vs Wolverine, voiced by Nolan North. This version is a member of Weapon X's Team X.

=== Live-action ===
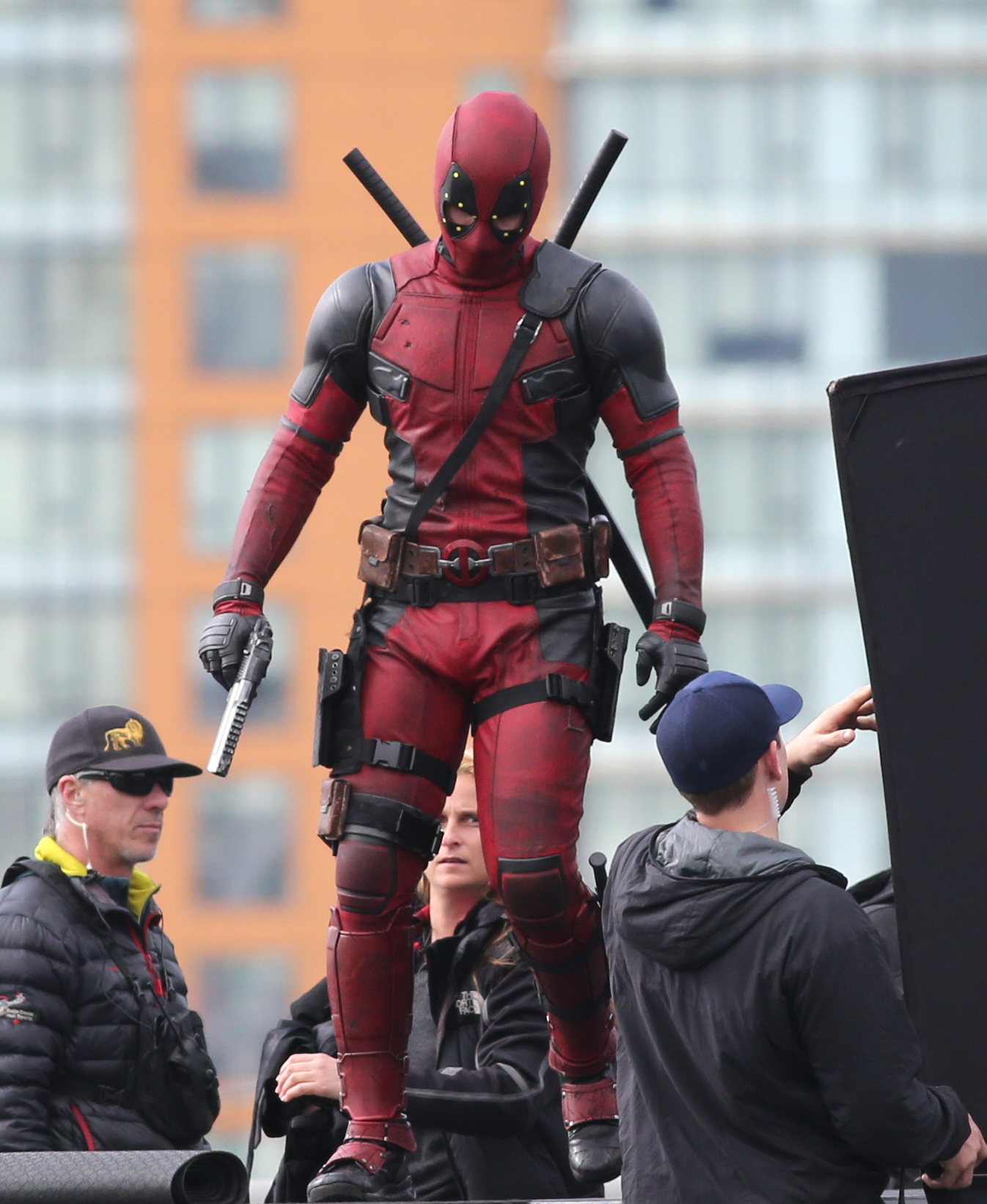
Top: Ryan Reynolds as Wade Wilson in X-Men Origins: Wolverine (2009)
Bottom: Reynolds in costume as Wade Wilson / Deadpool on the film set of Deadpool (2016).

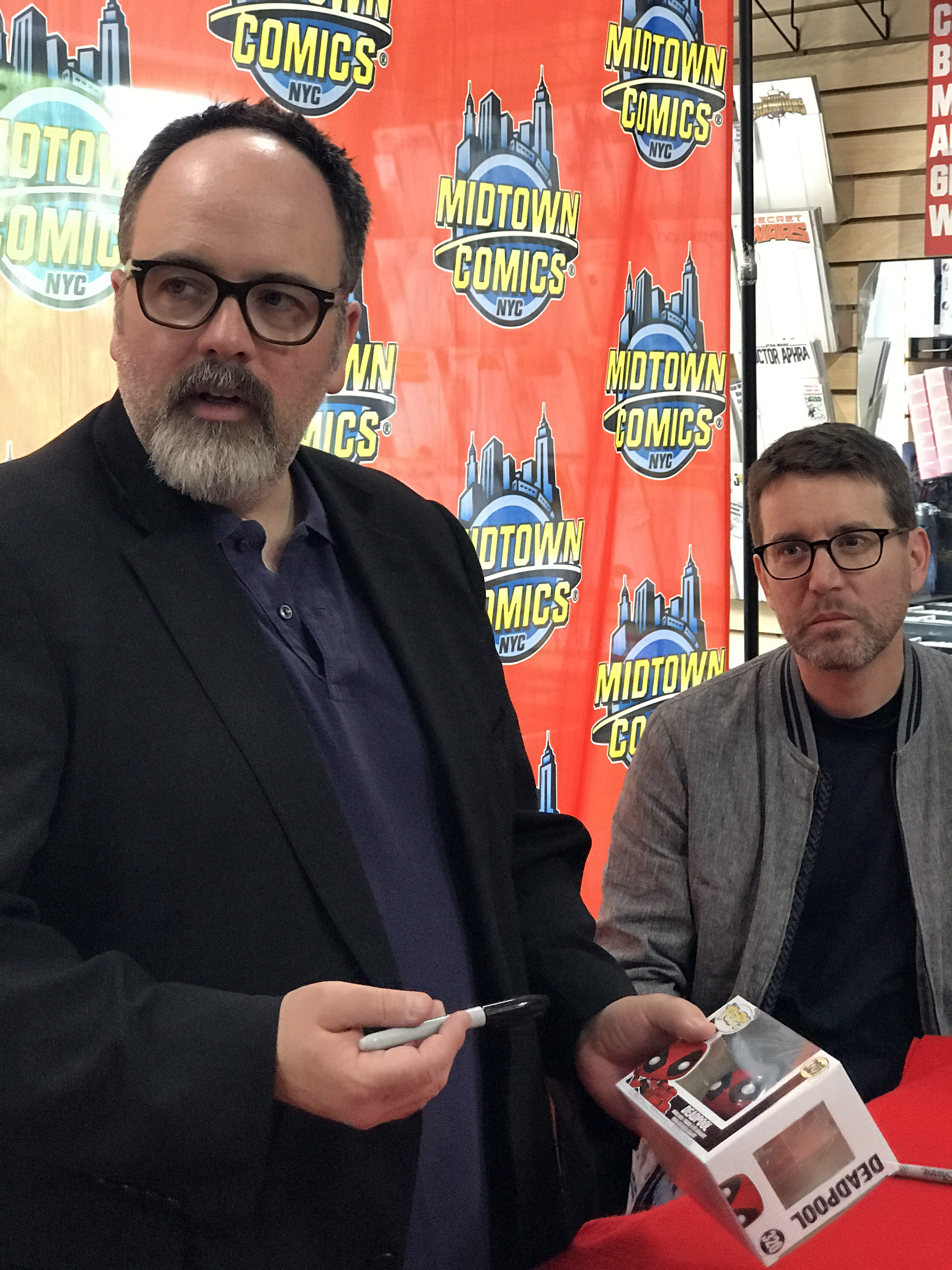
Comics writer Gerry Duggan and Deadpool film co-writer Rhett Reese autographing a Funko Pop figure of the character during a signing for Deadpool #300 at Midtown Comics in Manhattan, a week before the release of Deadpool 2.

- Two incarnations of Wade Wilson appear in the 21st Century Fox's X-Men film series, portrayed by Ryan Reynolds.
  - The first incarnation appears in X-Men Origins: Wolverine, with Scott Adkins serving as a stunt performer. This version is a highly skilled, wisecracking, and amoral mercenary who wields a pair of katanas with peak athleticism and skill sufficient to deflect automatic weapons fire. Additionally, he serves as a member of Team X until he is converted into "Weapon XI".
  - Following the events of X-Men: Days of Future Past, which reset the series' timeline from 1973 onward, Reynolds appears as a new incarnation of Wilson in Deadpool (2016). This version is a mercenary who is diagnosed with late-stage cancer and turns to Ajax after he offers a cure. Ajax tortures Wilson to catalyze the treatment, which results in the latter's recessive mutant genes activating, causing Wilson's disfigurement and healing factor. In response, he develops a vendetta against Ajax and undergoes a quest to force him to fix his disfigurement before eventually killing him upon learning it would be impossible.
    - Deadpool appears in the short film "How Deadpool Spent Halloween", portrayed again by Reynolds.
    - Before screenings of Logan in U.S. territories, a short film was shown teasing Deadpool 2, later titled Deadpool: No Good Deed and released online.
    - Deadpool appears in Deadpool 2 (2018), portrayed again by Reynolds, who also reprises his role as Weapon XI and portrays himself. After the death of his girlfriend Vanessa, Wilson finds himself protecting an angst-ridden boy named Russell Collins from Cable.
      - In December 2013, Rob Liefeld confirmed that Deadpool and Cable would be appearing in an X-Force film, with Ryan Reynolds returning as the former. In February 2017, Joe Carnahan had signed on as director, as well as co-writer with Reynolds. By September of the same year however, the studio parted ways with Carnahan while Drew Goddard replaced him as writer/director after previously working as a co-writer on the script for Deadpool 2. The following month, Cable actor Josh Brolin stated that production would begin in 2018.
    - After the then-proposed acquisition of 21st Century Fox by Disney was announced in December 2017 and completed in March 2019, Disney CEO Bob Iger said that Deadpool would be integrated into the Marvel Cinematic Universe (MCU) under Disney, with Reynolds set to reprise his role. On November 20, 2020, it was announced further that Marvel and Reynolds met with various writers and decided that Wendy Molyneux and Lizzie Molyneux-Logelin, known for their work on Bob's Burgers, would write the script for the third film, which Disney confirmed would remain R-rated and which would eventually become Deadpool & Wolverine. In August 2021, Marvel Studios president Kevin Feige stated Reynolds was working on the screenplay, while Reynolds said, "There's a 70% chance that filming starts in 2022". In March 2022, it was announced that Shawn Levy would direct the film, with Rhett Reese and Paul Wernick hired to rewrite the screenplay. Released in 2024, Deadpool & Wolverine sees Wilson joining forces with Wolverine to save the former's universe from the Time Variance Authority.
      - Deadpool appears in the live-action promotional short film Deadpool and Korg React, in which he reacts to a trailer for the film Free Guy alongside Korg.
- Deadpool will appear in Avengers: Doomsday (2026), portrayed again by Reynolds.
- A fourth film is in the works, as confirmed by Reynolds.

== Video games ==
- Deadpool appears in X-Men Legends II: Rise of Apocalypse, voiced by John Kassir.
- Deadpool appears as a playable character in Marvel: Ultimate Alliance, voiced again by John Kassir.
- Deadpool appears in Marvel Trading Card Game.
- Wade Wilson appears as the final boss of the X-Men Origins: Wolverine tie-in game, voiced by Steve Blum.
- Deadpool appears as an unlockable playable character in Marvel: Ultimate Alliance 2, voiced again by John Kassir. In the Wii, PSP and PS2 versions, he is playable from the start.
- Deadpool appears in Marvel Pinball, voiced by Nolan North.
- Deadpool appears in Pinball FX2, voiced by Nolan North.
- The Ultimate Marvel incarnation of Deadpool appears as a boss in Spider-Man: Shattered Dimensions, voiced by Nolan North. This version hosts the survival show Pain Factor.
- Deadpool appears as a playable character in Marvel vs. Capcom 3: Fate of Two Worlds and its updated version Ultimate Marvel vs. Capcom 3, voiced again by Nolan North.
- Deadpool appears as a playable character in Marvel Super Hero Squad Online, voiced by Tom Kenny.
- Deadpool appears as an unlockable character in Marvel Avengers Alliance.
- Deadpool appears in Marvel War of Heroes.
- Deadpool appears in Marvel Heroes, voiced again by Nolan North. Additionally, a pirate variant, Deadpool Kid, and Lady Deadpool appear as well, voiced by North, Troy Baker, and Alanna Ubach respectively.
- A Deadpool costume appears in LittleBigPlanet 3.
- Deadpool appears in a self-titled video game, voiced again by Nolan North.
- Deadpool appears as a playable character in Lego Marvel Super Heroes, voiced again by Nolan North. Additionally, he serves as the narrator for the bonus missions and gives the player quests in the game's hub.
- Deadpool, in his traditional and Uncanny X-Force suits, and an exclusive Ghost Rider incarnation appear as playable characters in Marvel Puzzle Quest.
- Deadpool appears as a playable character in Marvel Contest of Champions.
- Deadpool appears in Disk Wars Avengers: Ultimate Heroes.
- Deadpool appears as a playable character in Marvel: Future Fight.
- Deadpool appears in X-Men: Battle of the Atom.
- Deadpool appears as a "secret outfit" in Fortnite Battle Royale.
- Deadpool appears in Pinball FX 3.
- Two incarnations of Deadpool, Normal and Lil, appear in a self-titled Pinball video game, voiced again by Nolan North and Brian Huskey respectively.
- Deadpool appears in Marvel Powers United VR, voiced again by Jason Spisak.
- Deadpool appears as a playable character in Marvel Strike Force.
- Deadpool appears as a playable character in Marvel Ultimate Alliance 3: The Black Order, voiced again by Nolan North. This version is a member of the X-Men.
- Deadpool appears in Marvel Snap, voiced by Alex Mitts.
- Deadpool appears in Marvel Super War.
- Deadpool appears in Marvel Realm of Champions.
- Deadpool appears as an NPC in Marvel Future Revolution, voiced again by Nolan North. This version is an announcer for Sakaaran gladiatorial games.
- Deadpool appears as a downloadable playable character in Marvel's Midnight Suns, voiced again by Nolan North.
- Deadpool appears in Marvel's Deadpool VR, voiced by Neil Patrick Harris.
- Deadpool appears in Marvel Rivals, voiced by Alejandro Saab in English.
- Deadpool appears as a playable character in Marvel Tokon: Fighting Souls, voiced again by Nolan North in English and by Takehito Koyasu in Japanese. This version is a member of the Samurai Outriders alongside Ghost Rider, Blade, and Loki, revealing he is the one who comes up with the team name instead of calling it the Midnight Sons. His moveset and animations are an homage to several fighting games such as Street Fighter, Tekken, The King of Fighters, Mortal Kombat, and more.

== Miscellaneous ==
- Deadpool appears in the prose novel Deadpool: Paws, written by Stefan Petrucha.
- A physical pinball table based on Deadpool was developed and released by Stern Pinball in 2018.
- In 2024, Deadpool made appearances in Avengers Campus at Disney California Adventure and Walt Disney Studios Park. Additionally, the same year the character appeared in the show "Story Time with Deadpool" in Hollywood Land at Disney California Adventure. The holiday version of the show returned to the park in Fall 2025. In March 2026, the character also appeared at Disney Adventure World.

== See also ==
- X-Men in other media
- Wolverine in other media
- Cyclops in other media
- Jean Grey in other media
