= Bob, Agent of Hydra =

Marvel comics character

Publication information
- Publisher: Marvel Comics
- First appearance: Cable & Deadpool #38 (May 2007)
- Created by: Fabian Nicieza (writer); Reilly Brown (artist)

In-story information
- Alter ego: Robert Dobalina
- Species: Human
- Team affiliations: X Agency; Hydra
- Partnerships: Deadpool

Bob, Agent of Hydra (Robert Dobalina) is a fictional character appearing in American comic books published by Marvel Comics. The character is depicted as an antihero and a sidekick of Deadpool. A former member of the terrorist agency Hydra, he defected to help Wade Wilson, but has kept his Hydra uniform.

Bob had a cameo in the 2016 feature film Deadpool where he was portrayed by Rob Hayter.

== Publication history ==
Bob first appeared in Cable & Deadpool #38 (May 2007) and was created by writer Fabian Nicieza and artist Reilly Brown.

== Fictional character biography ==
Bob is an agent of Hydra who joined to maintain a steady job, but later defects to Deadpool during his attack on Hydra. After the two and Agent X return to the United States, they discover that Outlaw and Sandi have disappeared. Bob accompanies Deadpool in rescuing them and becomes an honorary member of Agency X. Bob accompanies Deadpool in helping Doctor Strange save reality after T-Ray threatens it with his novice magic.

Bob also traveled with Deadpool and Weasel to the Savage Land, where they encounter an assortment of dinosaurs. Deadpool attempts to teleport the dinosaurs to Genosha as a prank on Magneto, but instead transports them to the Genoshan embassy in downtown Manhattan, where they are possessed by Symbiotes.

Bob is called upon by Deadpool to join him in becoming a pirate. They become lost at sea, during which Bob develops scurvy. Deadpool brings him to Kalani, an information clerk, to treat him, and the two ultimately decide to live together.

Bob assists Deadpool when an old enemy threatens all of reality. Disposing of T-Ray had caused magical breakage through multiple realms, so Doctor Strange sends Deadpool and Bob through said realms; their mission requires a monster slain in each one. Deadpool usually ends up saving Bob's life in each realm as well.

After two years of absence, Deadpool again calls upon Bob to help secure an escape route for him and Shiklah. Despite initially being offended by Deadpool's long absence, he agrees to help, somehow getting a Hydra Carrier to rescue them. However, the trio gets kidnapped by MODOK, interested in Shiklah's succubus powers. They manage to escape, but in the process Bob gets his legs badly crushed and, as Shiklah pleads for his safety, Deadpool agrees to dump him to a veterinary clinic at first, then a real hospital. He recovers enough to help Deadpool fend off Dracula's forces, using MODOK's chair for mobility. He eventually manages to make a full recovery, attending Wade and Shiklah's wedding.

== Powers and abilities ==
Bob has no superpowers and does not have training in any combat or tactical skills. The training Hydra gives its minions seems primarily focused on running away and hiding when confronted with danger, making Bob a parody of the cannon-fodder henchmen frequently seen working for evil organizations in comic books. Even this training seems useless, as Bob has cited such Hydra lessons as "Hiding behind each other" and "If I can't see them they can't see me." Deadpool has said that Bob is better at running away than anyone he has seen.

Bob has a pathological fear ingrained in him of certain characters who are particularly devastating enemies of Hydra. Among these are Captain America, Wolverine, and Elektra. Notably, Bob has mentioned Hydra specifically trains their minions to flee as quickly as possible upon hearing the distinctive "snikt" sound of Wolverine's claws. When stressed he has a tendency to shout "Hail Hydra!" and other propaganda of the organization such as "Cut off one head and two more will take its place!"

Despite his incompetence, Bob sometimes gets lucky. He was able to fly a plane a long distance despite having no knowledge of how to do so, and killed a Symbiote-possessed dinosaur by accident while fleeing from it. He was also able to save Deadpool's life during a battle with Wolverine by staying put to reattach his head despite his cowardice. Even though he is useless in a fight, Deadpool seems to delight in taking him on dangerous missions, seemingly for his own amusement. Bob goes along with him, although it is unclear whether this is because he is afraid of Wade or genuinely considers him a friend - or because he's a committed minion and does not know what else to do.

Despite his shortcomings and his cowardice, Bob's strength lies in him being a dedicated friend, challenging his own fears to help his friends.

== Reception ==
=== Accolades ===
- In 2021, Comic Book Resources (CBR) ranked Bob, Agent of Hydra 10th in their "10 Smartest Marvel Sidekicks" list.
- In 2022, Newsarama ranked Bob, Agent of Hydra 6th in their "Best superhero sidekicks of all time" list.

== Other versions ==
=== Identity Wars ===
In an alternate universe visited by Deadpool, Hulk and Spider-Man, Bob works for Wade Wilson, a powered crime lord, in New York City. The main universe Deadpool kills his counterpart's men, including Bob.

=== Marvel Max ===
An alternate universe version of Bob appears in Deadpool Max. This version is a CIA agent and the handler of Deadpool.

== In other media ==
=== Film ===
Bob appears in Deadpool (2016), portrayed by Rob Hayter. Due to 20th Century Fox holding the rights to Deadpool and Marvel Studios holding the rights to Hydra at the time, this version is a henchman of Ajax.

=== Video games ===
- Bob appears in Deadpool's ending in Ultimate Marvel vs. Capcom 3.
- Bob appears as an optional mini-boss in Marvel Heroes.
- Bob appears in Marvel: Avengers Alliance.
- Bob appears in Marvel Future Revolution.
- Bob appears in Marvel Snap.
- Bob appears in Marvel's Midnight Suns.
- Bob appears in Marvel Puzzle Quest.
