= T-ray (disambiguation) =

Terahertz radiation is electromagnetic waves within the ITU-designated band of frequencies from 0.1 to 30 terahertz.

T-ray may also refer to:

- T-Ray (comics), a fictional Marvel Comics character, Nemesis to Deadpool
- T-Ray (producer) (a.k.a. Todd Ray), music producer
