= Outlaw (Marvel Comics) =

Fictional characters

Outlaw is the name of two characters appearing in American comic books published by Marvel Comics. The first Outlaw named Nigel Higgins is England's version of Punisher that first appeared in Punisher (vol. 2) #64 and was created by Dan Abnett, Andy Lanning, and Douglas Braithwaite. The second Outlaw named Inez Temple was created by Gail Simone for the series Deadpool and Agent X. She is a mutant with the ability of superhuman strength and an uncanny aptitude with firearms.

== Fictional character biography ==
=== Nigel Higgins ===
Outlaw

Publication information
- Publisher: Marvel Comics
- First appearance: Punisher (vol. 2) #64 (June 1992)
- Created by: Dan Abnett; Andy Lanning; Douglas Braithwaite

In-story information
- Alter ego: Nigel Higgins
- Species: Human
- Team affiliations: Champions of Europe
- Abilities: Expert marksmanship

Nigel Higgins is a man living in England who became the vigilante Outlaw after being inspired by Punisher's activities. When Kingpin plans to use the English channel to gather the European crime families into a united crime syndicate, Outlaw is the main contact for Punisher and Microchip.

Outlaw later leaves the vigilante business, regretting if he should let villains live or not. His normal life is short-lived, as he is chosen by Collector to partake in the "Contest of Champions" against his will. After obtaining the Iso-Sphere, Outlaw used its powers to have Maestro contained somewhere, the other contestants to return to whichever place they want, and for the Iso-Sphere to be destroyed. Upon returning to England with the Earth-616 contestants, Outlaw had also wished for those he had killed to be returned to life. Outlaw returns to the superhero business, helping those in need instead of punishing the guilty.

During the Secret Empire storyline, Outlaw appears as a member of the Champions of Europe who are prepared for the event that Hydra invades Europe.

=== Inez Temple ===
Outlaw
- Cover art for Agent X #2. Art by Alvin Lee.

Publication information
- Publisher: Marvel Comics
- First appearance: Deadpool #65 (May 2002)
- Created by: Gail Simone

In-story information
- Alter ego: Inez Temple
- Species: Human mutant
- Team affiliations: Agency X The 198
- Notable aliases: Crazy Inez
- Abilities: Minimal superhuman strength Enhanced resistance to injury Healing factor Use of firearms and a lasso

Inez Temple was born in Texas. As a child, she was bullied by other children, who called her "Crazy Inez". Inez is a mutant and possesses a degree of superhuman strength. As a result, she was far stronger than her peers and beat them whenever they bullied her, but her father taught her to be responsible with her powers. She is a descendant of Lance Temple, who was also known as the Wild West gunman Outlaw Kid.

As an adult, Inez becomes a mercenary. She encounters Deadpool several times and flirts with him, culminating in them dating. When Agent X announces his plans to set up a special agency for mercenaries, known as Agency X, Outlaw declines his offer to join. She returns to Texas to be with her father, who is ill. After her father dies, Inez officially joins Agency X.

After Decimation, Inez is one of the few mutants to retain her powers. Heeding Cyclops's call for sanctuary, Inez travels to the X-Mansion for protection, living with Magma and Skids. She forms a friendly relationship with Magma; listening when Magma complains about Empath stalking her.

Domino, Shatterstar, and Caliban break the 198 remaining mutants out of the X-Mansion and take them to a bunker in the middle of the desert, where they are sealed inside. Outlaw is used by Johnny Dee along with other mutants to attack Domino and Shatterstar. After holding Domino at gunpoint, Toad snaps her out of Dee's control. The 198 are freed from the bunker by the X-Men, Avengers, and military forces. Outlaw takes a leadership role throughout the crisis.

Outlaw is kidnapped along with Sandi Brandenberg by T-Ray, one of Deadpool's nemeses. Deadpool swiftly rescues them, seemingly killing T-Ray by skewering his head with his sword. The two are reunited with Agent X, who has been rendered morbidly obese after being experimented on by Hydra, and end up under Deadpool's employ after being tentatively appointed head of Agency X.

She later joins Domino's Hotshots.

Inez continues to maintain a 'friends with benefits' relationship with Deadpool as evidenced by the two hooking up in April 2026.

== Powers and abilities ==
The Nigel Higgins version of Outlaw has exceptional skills with firearms.

The Inez Temple version of Outlaw has some degree of superhuman strength, the exact limits of which aren't known. However, she can punch through brick walls with ease. The tissues of her body are somewhat more resistant to physical injury than that of an ordinary human. However, she is far from invulnerable and can be injured by weapons composed of conventional materials or with sufficient force, much like an ordinary human. Nonetheless she can withstand high caliber bullets without them penetrating, though she isn't totally impervious to them. In at least one instance after being shot with .45 caliber bullet from a moderate distance, Inez sustained no more injury other than some bruises. If injured, Outlaw is capable of healing herself somewhat faster from minor injuries than an ordinary human. Apart from her mutant powers, Outlaw has exceptional skills with firearms and with a lasso.

== Other versions ==
=== Deadpool Pulp ===
An alternate universe version of Inez Temple appears in Deadpool Pulp. This version is a fugitive who was accused of stealing atomic bomb equipment.

=== Deadpool MAX ===
An alternate universe version of Inez Temple appears in Deadpool Max. This version is an asylum patient with dissociative identity disorder with whom Deadpool has a brief relationship.

== In other media ==
- Inez Temple makes a non-speaking cameo appearance in The Punisher: No Mercy as a member of S.H.I.E.L.D.
- A cardboard cutout depicting Inez Temple is seen in the film Deadpool 2.
- Inez Temple stars in the novel "Outlaw: Relentless" by Aconyte Books.

== Reception ==
Screen Rant ranked Inez Temple in their "10 Strongest Deadpool Allies, Ranked by Physical Strength" and "The 10 Best Mercenaries In Marvel Comics".
