= Bloodpool (comics) =

Fictional group of superheroes and a comic book series created by Rob Liefeld

- Cover to Bloodpool Special #1 (March 1996); Art by Pat Lee.

Publication information
- Publisher: Extreme Studios
- First appearance: Bloodpool Special #1 (March 1996)
- Created by: Rob Liefeld (concept); Jo Duffy (writer); Pat Lee (artist)

In-story information
- Member(s): Fusion; Psilence; Rubble; Seoul; Task; Wylder

Bloodpool is a superhero team created by comics creator Rob Liefeld. Their self-titled comic book series was published by Image Comics in 1996 through Liefeld's Extreme Studios. The team's roster includes Rubble, Task, Seoul, Psilence, Wylder, and Fusion. The underage superheroes were recruited by the government for eventual inclusion in the prestigious Youngblood team.

== Team members ==
Task (Ryan Orsini): A young super-soldier possessed of a powerful regenerative factor. Task's body has also been enhanced with cybernetics and genetic engineering granting him increased strength, speed, agility, and reflexes. He is an expert in various weapons. Task becomes the leader of Youngblood for a brief period.

Psilence: A young telepath who acts as the team's living communication system with her powers. Psilence is mute.

Fusion: A young man with the power to manipulate matter, both organic and inorganic, and transmute substances into different forms. For example, he can turn a person to stone by holding a rock and then touching them.

Seoul (Lily Lee): A young female channeler and warrior. Can summon the spirits of dead warriors to enhance her natural athletic abilities.

Rubble: A genetically engineered superhuman who is made of living stone and able to alter other earthen materials nearby. He can use parts of his body as blunt objects, as he can easily break them off without injury.

Wylder: A genetically altered teen with superhuman strength, speed, agility, and reflexes, as well as cybernetic claws and blades on his arm. He has been genetically altered, making him half-human and half-animal.

== See also ==
- List of Image Comics publications
- Youngblood
