= Teenage Mutant Ninja Turtles (Dreamwave Productions) =

Comic book published by Dreamwave Productions between June and December 2003

Publication information
- Publisher: Dreamwave
- Schedule: Monthly
- Format: Cancelled
- Genre: Superhero
- Publication date: June – December 2003
- No. of issues: 7
- Main character(s): Leonardo, Donatello, Michelangelo, Raphael

Creative team
- Created by: Peter David
- Written by: Peter David
- Artist: LeSean Thomas
- Penciller: LeSean
- Inker: Erik Sander
- Letterer: Matt Moylan
- Colorist: various

Collected editions
- Teenage Mutant Ninja Turtles Volume 1: ISBN 0973278684

Teenage Mutant Ninja Turtles is a comic book published by Dreamwave Productions in 2003. The first four stories are based on episodes of the 2003 Teenage Mutant Ninja Turtles television series, but told from the view of supporting characters, before the creation of new stories, just as the original issues of TMNT Adventures followed the 1987 TV series before developing new stories.

The series ran for seven issues before it was cancelled as Dreamwave went out of business.
