= Deadpool (TV series) =

Unproduced American animated television series

Deadpool: The Animated Series
- Genre: Comedy; Action; Superhero
- Created by: Donald Glover; Stephen Glover
- Based on: Deadpool by: Fabian Nicieza; Rob Liefeld
- Country of origin: United States
- Original language: English

Production
- Executive producers: Donald Glover; Stephen Glover; Jeph Loeb; Jim Chory
- Production companies: ABC Signature Studios; FX Productions; Marvel Television

Original release
- Network: FXX

Deadpool: The Animated Series is an unproduced American adult animated cable television series developed for FXX by Donald and Stephen Glover, based on the Marvel Comics character Deadpool. The series was being produced by Marvel Television in association with FX Productions and ABC Signature Studios, with Donald and Stephen Glover serving as showrunners.

Ordered straight-to-series by FXX in May 2017 following the successful partnership of Marvel Television and FX Productions in making the X-Men spin-off series Legion, 10 episodes were planned for the series to debut in 2018. Donald and Stephen Glover had begun work in a writers' room by the time of the series' announcement. Early animation had been completed for the series that August, with the Glovers wanting a distinct voice and tone from previous incarnations of the character including the Deadpool films.

The announcement of the series, and the involvement of Donald Glover specifically, was met with enthusiasm from commentators. However, in March 2018, FX Networks announced that it was no longer moving forward with the series after Marvel decided not to pursue the version of the series that the Glovers were creating. This was met with criticism, including from Donald Glover himself, who publicly suggested that racism may have contributed to Marvel's decision.

== Production ==
=== Announcement ===
After the success of Marvel Television and FX Networks' partnership to create the X-Men series Legion for FX, its sister channel FXX gave a 10-episode series order in May 2017 to an untitled adult animated comedy series based on the popular Marvel Comics character Deadpool. Marvel Television executives were fans of FXX's animated series Archer and had approached FX about the idea a year after its president John Landgraf had detailed plans to have FXX "aggressively" make more adult animated series.

FX approached Donald Glover, "a significant talent with increasing geek cred", and his brother Stephen to serve as writers, executive producers and showrunners of the series. Donald Glover had an overall deal with FX Productions, a pre-established relationship with Marvel after starring in the Marvel Cinematic Universe (MCU) film Spider-Man: Homecoming (2017), and the brothers created the "breakout hit" Atlanta for FX. After "complex" negotiations, the series was announced as being produced by Marvel Television, FX Productions, and ABC Signature Studios, with Marvel's Jeph Loeb and Jim Chory also serving as executive producers. The series was to be titled Deadpool: The Animated Series.

=== Development ===
By the series' announcement, a writers' room for the show had been established in London where Donald Glover was filming his role as Lando Calrissian in Solo: A Star Wars Story (2018). Landgraf explained that FX was happy to accommodate the Glovers' busy schedule because of their talent and not wanting to "squelch" any opportunities that may come up for them. He added that the series would be different in voice and tone from the Deadpool films because of the difference between animation and live-action, and also because of the Glovers' own unique voice and tone. Making a series "that was distinctly different from the movies" was something that FX felt strongly about when taking on the project.

With the announcement of the series and the involvement of Donald Glover, several outlets noted that his Atlanta co-star Zazie Beetz had just been cast as the comic character Domino in the Deadpool (2016) sequel Deadpool 2 (2018). In May 2017, Beetz expressed interest in reprising her role in the series if the character was included. A brief clip from the series was available to be shown at FX's Television Critics Association press tour panel in August, and Landgraf stated that animation would begin in full for the show later in the year, simultaneously with the filming of the second season of Atlanta. He added that a specific release schedule had not been decided on yet "because it's gotta be great" first.

Discussing pressure to live up to previous portrayals of Deadpool, Donald Glover said he did not feel any unlike in his work on Star Wars and Atlanta, especially because Deadpool "is very aware of himself". Stefani Robinson, a member of the writers' room, said that they chose to interpret the original comics from "an angle that was very true to us and made sense to us", rather than look to the films or general public's perception of the character. She highlighted the fact that Deadpool cannot die, saying: "It's sort of fun to play with a character who can do anything, basically, and really get into the mentality of someone who is bored with life, who doesn't feel any stakes, doesn't feel any danger, and is like, 'OK – This is just kind of my life, and what do I do with being someone who exists on a superior platform than everybody else?' What would you do if you lived forever, couldn't die?"

=== Cancellation ===
In March 2018, FX announced that it had decided not to move forward with the series, citing creative differences. Their statement added that the network, the Glovers, and Marvel Television agreed to "part ways". FX did clarify that their relationship with Marvel Television would continue with Legion. Donald Glover denied rumors that he was too busy to work on the series, and within a week of this announcement he wrote and released a 15-page script on his Twitter account titled "Finale". The script features Deadpool travelling to Kenya to protect the rhinoceros Sudan (who died several days earlier), and contemplating why the series was cancelled. The script was soon removed from Glover's account.

In "Finale", Deadpool finds potential blame for the cancellation in comments written for the series about Marvel "trying to sell toys to 7-year-old boys and 50-year-old pedophiles"; notes the socio-political issues of depicting a "violent, gun-loving white man ranting on TV"; and suggests that Marvel and FX may have been racist in not wanting to make the series due to its all black writing staff and the black references they had been using in scripts. The latter point echoed earlier comments made by Glover that he needed a "white translator" to trick FX into allowing him and his black writing staff to make Atlanta the way they wanted to. Deadpool goes on to state in the script:

"It just feels like everyone wants something different, but no one wants to do anything different to get it. Doesn't Marvel have enough feel-good minority shows everyone supports but doesn't watch? I mean, I think our show woulda [sic] been funny. I just wanted a place to be honest. And I guess that place is Freeform".

The script also mentioned an episode featuring Taylor Swift, which Stephen Glover confirmed, calling it "hilarious" and "the last straw" for Marvel. He added that the series "wasn't too black. It wasn't really that black at all. But we definitely wanted to give Rick and Morty a run for their money and I think we would have". In August, Landgraf was asked why FX had made the "shocking" decision to not move forward with the series, and he stated that Marvel had full control over the use of the character and decided not to pursue the version of the series that the Glovers wanted to make. Landgraf added that he had personally liked the work that the Glovers had done on the series, and that FX would have continued with that version if it was their decision. He believed that Marvel would eventually revive the series, but would "hire someone else to do a different show". Deadpool creator Rob Liefeld stated in May 2019 that a new animated series featuring the character was coming "sooner than later".

== Reception ==
Ryan Reynolds, producer and star of the Deadpool films, was not involved with the series' development but described Donald Glover as a "genius" and lamented the news that the series would not be moving forward.
