= Dreamwave Productions =

Canadian art design studio and comic book publisher

- Industry: Comics
- Founded: 1996
- Founder: Pat Lee and Roger Lee
- Defunct: 2005
- Headquarters: Toronto, Canada

Dreamwave Productions was a Canadian art design studio and comic book publisher founded in 1996. Best known for its comic book adaptations of Transformers, the company shut down on January 4, 2005.

== History ==
Brothers Pat Lee and Roger Lee founded Dreamwave Productions in Toronto, Canada in 1996 as an imprint under Image Comics, publishing their first mini-series Darkminds. Pat maintained artistic control while Roger managed the business operations. Dreamwave split off from Image Comics in April 2002.

Dreamwave acquired the license for the Transformers toyline from Hasbro in December 2001. The first mini-series, written by Chris Sarracini & drawn by Pat Lee and based on the Transformers: Generation 1 characters, was the top-selling book on the sales charts for its entire run. Various Transformers ongoing and limited series followed, covering various continuities within the Transformers franchise.

On January 4, 2005, Dreamwave announced that it had gone out of business and closed down, citing "the shrinking comic book market combined with a weak U.S. dollar" as the reason for their closure.

According to the terms of the contract the company had with Federal Express, its freelancers were left liable for the cost of shipping their unpublished, unpaid for work to Canada. Guido Guidi and Don Figueroa were two such freelancers affected.

After the company's bankruptcy in January 2005, Dreamwave's assets were auctioned off on August 2, 2005 and purchased by Canadian entrepreneur Christian Dery, who planned to relaunch its original properties. However, the new Dreamwave have not published nor announced the publishing of any titles since the 2005 announcement.

IDW Publishing acquired the Transformers license in May 2005 and began publishing new Transformers comics in 2006.

== List of Dreamwave comics ==
=== Original series ===
- Arkanium #1—5 (September 2002—March 2003)
- Darkminds #1—4
- Echo
- Fate of the Blade #1—5 (August 2002—February 2003)
- Limbo City #1—2 (1990)
- NecroWar #1—3 (July—September 2003)
- Neon Cyber (set in the same world as Darkminds)
- Sandscape #1—4 (January—May 2003)
- Shidima #0—7 (2001, set in the same world as Warlands)
- Warlands:
  - Warlands: The Age of Ice #1/2 (December 2002)
  - Warlands: Dark Tide Rising #1—6 (December 2002—May 2003)

=== Licensed series ===
- Custom Robo (Nintendo Power Issues #184, #185, and #186)
- Duel Masters #1—8 (November 2003—September 2004, cancelled after issue #8)
- Devil May Cry #1—3 (February—September 2004, bankrupt before final issue and TPB were released)
- Killzone (bankrupt before issue #1)
- Maximo #1 (January 2004, cancelled after issue #1)
- Mega Man #1—4 (September—December 2003, cancelled after issue #4)
- Metroid Prime comic series; debuted in Nintendo Power
- Teenage Mutant Ninja Turtles #1—7 (June—December 2003, canceled after issue #7)
- Transformers:
  - Transformers: Generation 1 #1—6 (April—October 2002)
  - Transformers: Armada/Energon #1—30 (July 2002—December 2004)
  - Transformers: The War Within #1—6 (October 2002—March 2003)
  - Transformers: More Than Meets the Eye #1—8 (April—November 2003)
  - Transformers: Generation 1 (Volume 2) #1—6 (April—September 2003)
  - Transformers: War Within — The Dark Ages #1—6 (October 2003—April 2004)
  - Transformers/G.I. Joe #1—6 (August 2003—March 2004)
  - Transformers: Generation 1 (Volume 3) #0—10 (December 2003—December 2004)
  - Transformers: More Than Meets the Eye: Armada #1—3 (March—May 2004)
  - Transformers Summer Special #1 (May 2004)
  - Transformers: Micromasters #1—4 (June—October 2004)
  - Transformers: War Within — The Age of Wrath #1—3 (September—December 2004)
  - Transformers/G.I. Joe: Divided Front #1 (October 2004)
- Xevoz

== See also ==
- List of Transformers comic book series

== Bibliography ==
- Comic Book Resources - Dreamwave's financial debts
