= T-Ray (comics) =

- T-Ray as depicted in Deadpool (vol. 3) #13 (January 1998). Art by Pete Woods (penciller) and Nathan Massengill (inker).

Publication information
- Publisher: Marvel Comics
- First appearance: Deadpool #1 (January 1997)
- Created by: Joe Kelly (writer); Ed McGuiness (artist)

In-story information
- Full name: Wade Winston Wilson (possibly)
- Notable aliases: Jack
- Abilities: Zombie-like physiology; Superhuman strength and durability; Fourth wall awareness; Knowledge of voodoo magic

T-Ray is a supervillain appearing in American comic books published by Marvel Comics. The character was created by Joe Kelly and Ed McGuiness. A mercenary soldier, he played an important role in the series Deadpool; T-Ray served to remind Wade Wilson, also known as Deadpool, what a failure he was. He is Deadpool's archenemy for many issues and almost everything that happened to Deadpool was a part of an elaborate plan orchestrated by him.

== Fictional character biography ==
T-Ray is seen hanging out at the Hellhouse, a place where Deadpool and other mercenaries get their assignments. Deadpool and T-Ray are constantly battling to show who is the bigger man, as well as the better mercenary. During these verbal conflicts, T-Ray typically makes vague threats while Deadpool retorts with 1980s pop-culture references. T-Ray is shown to be a sadistic, remorseless killer who has no qualms against killing children. As T-Ray is meditating naked between the bodies of his victims, several names tattooed on his back are seen, all but one with an "X" through them. The last name not crossed off is Wade Wilson, Deadpool's real name.

T-Ray and Deadpool come into conflict at the Hellhouse and T-Ray ups the ante by burning off Wade's mask. The insane killer Typhoid Mary is freed by Wade during this time and Wade, inspired by his friend Siryn's attempts to redeem him, tries to redeem Typhoid Mary. He fails and Mary proves that he has not become the hero he thinks. Deadpool falls into a deep depression, becoming more aggressive and anti-social. He tries to ask Siryn for help in his own way: by starting a fight with her friend Warpath. Siryn is disgusted with Deadpool's behaviour and leaves, while Deadpool tries to drown his sorrow with alcohol. He wakes up to see Siryn and they spend the night, but when he wakes up it turns out to be Typhoid Mary in disguise.

Returning home, Deadpool tries to find support with his friends Blind Al and Weasel, but he's unable to find Weasel at the Hellhouse. T-Ray appears and challenges Deadpool for a fight. Recent events have destroyed Deadpool's tenuous grip on his sanity and T-Ray, revealing his formidable magical abilities, defeats him with ease. T-Ray leaves Deadpool broken in both body and spirit.

Over the next few months, Deadpool rebuilds his confidence and sanity, but shortly afterwards he starts to have hallucinations of a woman. He finally finds out her identity after some unorthodox treatment by Doctor Bong that she is Mercedes Wilson, his thought-deceased wife. Deadpool meets up with Mercedes in Georgia. T-Ray returns, crucifies one of Deadpool's friends on the Hellhouse front steps and kidnaps Mercedes. He issues a challenge to Deadpool and Deadpool accepts.

During their confrontation, T-Ray claims to be the real Wade Wilson. T-Ray tells the story of Wade and Mercedes Wilson, a teacher and his wife living a happy life until a wounded mercenary called Jack shows up. Jack is nursed back to health by the Wilsons, but turns on them, killing Mercedes and taking Wade's identity to hide from his previous employers. Killing Mercedes is too much for his mind to handle and he starts to believe that he really is Wade Wilson. He also starts to train to avenge Mercedes and becomes Deadpool. The real Wilson trains in voodoo and magic, eventually becoming T-Ray.

Months later, T-Ray, now an agent of Thanos, resurrects Deadpool, who has been killed in a fight with Weapon X, using an artifact Thanos gave him to create many copies of Deadpool. Thanos is jealous of Deadpool's relationship with Death and T-Ray is to "curse him with immortality" so that he may never see Death again. In the end, Deadpool destroys the artifact and all the copies, but not the real Deadpool, are drawn into T-Ray, destroying his mind. Deadpool claims that this means he was the real Wade Wilson all along. The mindless T-Ray is taken by one of Deadpool's friends, lacking the mental capacity to speak up.

After having his mental fluctuations cured by Cable, Deadpool claimed that his memories were now much more clear. He pointed out several holes in T-Ray's claims, including the fact that in his flashback he depicted "Jack" as wearing Deadpool's costume even though Deadpool did not exist yet. He also recalled that he had registered in the military under the name Wade Wilson years before encountering T-Ray. However, he also acknowledged that the truth may never really be known, as both he and T-Ray are insane. It is never confirmed if T-Ray and Deadpool are the same person.

The head wound T-Ray sustained in his fight with Deadpool causes him to leak mystical energy, damaging the fabric of several universes in the process. Doctor Strange contacts Agency X to hire Deadpool to fix the mess he inadvertently created. Deadpool and his erstwhile sidekick Bob, Agent of Hydra are sent throughout the various planes T-Ray made contact with to collect life force from the denizens there. Deadpool resurrects T-Ray, who is bound to serve as a guardian of the Mystic Realms he had breached.

T-Ray and Slayback are hired by Interpol agent Allison Kemp to help her assassinate Deadpool, receiving aid from Evil Deadpool. During their battle, T-Ray attempts to kill Deadpool with his own bomb, but instead accidentally blows himself up as Deadpool reveals that the bomb was a decoy, and that the real one was the "detonator" that he had allowed T-Ray to grab.

== Powers and abilities ==
T-Ray has all the characteristics of a zombie: he has pale skin, incredible strength and durability, and a truly monumental stench (according to Deadpool), though he does retain free will and intelligence. After having a hole knocked through him in Deadpool #32 it is revealed that he has dirt inside of him instead of organs. This backs up his claim of lacking a heart.

He has extensive knowledge of magic, especially voodoo rituals, that allow him to raise the dead.

As a servant of Thanos, he possessed an artifact which could take aspects of Deadpool's personality and give them independent existence.
