= Agent X (Marvel Comics) =

Fictional comic book character

- Cover art for Agent X #3. Art by Alvin Lee.

Publication information
- Publisher: Marvel Comics
- First appearance: As Nijo: Deadpool #65 (May 2002); As Alex Hayden/Agent X Agent X #1 (September 2002)
- Created by: Gail Simone; Alvin Lee

In-story information
- Alter ego: Nijo Minamiyori
- Species: Human mutant
- Team affiliations: X Agency
- Notable aliases: Alex Hayden
- Abilities: Superhuman strength, stamina, agility, speed, and reflexes; Regenerative healing factor; Telepathic immunity; Disease immunity; Longevity; Expert marksman

Agent X (Nijo Minamiyori, alias Alex Hayden) is a fictional mercenary appearing in American comic books published by Marvel Comics. Created by Gail Simone and Alvin Lee, the character first appeared in Agent X #1 (Sept 2002), by Gail Simone and UDON.

== Publication history ==
Agent X was born out of experiments with Marvel Comics' long-running Deadpool series, including the "miniseries within a series," (Deadpool: Agent of Weapon X and Deadpool: Funeral for a Freak), in which the main series' numbering was demoted to secondary status below the "miniseries" numbering. Marvel decided to run a "final arc" to close the series, then restart it from #1 with an X in the title to more closely identify it with their popular X-Men franchise. As part of the same effort, Cable was changed to Soldier X and X-Force to X-Statix. Rumors circulated among fans that the relaunches were due in part to a royalty dispute with Rob Liefeld, which Liefeld denied. Online humorist Gail Simone was chosen to write Deadpool's final arc and the new series, with art by the UDON studio, which had recently revamped Taskmaster in a well-received miniseries.

Agent X replaced Deadpool with a similar protagonist, while including ambiguous hints as to the nature of his relationship with the original character. Simone publicly clashed with Marvel's editorial staff as the relaunched title struggled to find a foothold, then left the book after issue 7. The series continued the cynical, slapstick action that had characterized its parent series. A central feature of Agent X was the question of the title character's identity, sometimes implied to be Deadpool himself. Deadpool refers to Agent X as his "Earth-2 Counterpart," a comedic reference to DC Comics' designation of different Earths for different iterations of identical and similar characters.

Towards the end, two of these fill-ins were published to small fanfare: those by noted author Evan Dorkin and the acclaimed art team of Juan Bobillo and Marcelo Sosa. Soon after, Agent X was canceled with issue #12. However, shortly after this announcement, Marvel decided to launch a Cable & Deadpool book as a change in direction, which ended up being a much more successful consolidation of the two characters into one title. This allowed Simone and UDON to complete their initial vision as part of a three-issue arc tying up the loose ends and restoring Deadpool for use in the new book, which was published after a month's hiatus as Agent X #13-15.

Agent X also appeared in Cable & Deadpool #11-12. He would make another appearance in #38-39, where he was captured on a mission against Hydra, who gave him arthritis using new technology, then morbid obesity so he would not notice the arthritis. He was rescued by Deadpool, who was hired by Sandi Brandenberg and Outlaw. After being rescued, Agent X decided to allow Deadpool to run Agency X until he was cured of his disabilities.

== Fictional character biography ==
Nijo Minamiyori is an assassin, mercenary, and agent employed by the assassin Black Swan. He blamed Deadpool for his brother's death as he was among the targets of Deadpool's apparently successful assassination of the Japanese crime lords named the Four Winds. After Black Swan downloads a mental virus into Deadpool's brain, Deadpool attacks Black Swan and Nijo at Black Swan's castle in Germany. However, Black Swan reveals that he had killed the Four Winds, including Nijo's brother, and was angered at Deadpool receiving credit for his actions. A bomb Deadpool had brought detonates, apparently killing him, Nijo, and Black Swan.

Nijo resurfaces in New York and assumes the alias of Alex Hayden, aiming to be the best mercenary alive. He is found by Sandi Brandenberg, Deadpool's former secretary, who assumes him to be Deadpool. When Sandi calls Taskmaster to train Alex, Taskmaster and Outlaw notice that Alex is ambidextrous and more skilled with guns than Deadpool, leading them to conclude that he cannot be Deadpool. Sandi and Alex then form the mercenary group Agency X.

Alex becomes disillusioned with his work and decides to shut down the agency, but finds himself unable to tell Sandi. After being attacked while traveling to a meeting between the Four Winds families, Alex, Taskmaster, and Sandi return to Sandi's apartment to find Black Swan and Deadpool waiting. It is revealed that Black Swan used his powers in an act of desperation to save himself during the explosion, giving him, Deadpool, and Alex each other's skills and attributes.

Black Swan proposes a three-way psychic operation to restore each man to their correct personal states, but double-crosses them. Outlaw returns in time to help fight Black Swan, who has absorbed Alex and Deadpool's powers to augment himself. After Taskmaster and Outlaw distract Black Swan, Deadpool pins Swan to Taskmaster's explosives-laden van, which is detonated by Alex. The group then repeatedly shoots Black Swan to make sure he is dead.

After a botched attempt to steal a device from Hydra, Sandi and Outlaw convince Deadpool to rescue Alex. Alex had been affected by the device he was supposed to steal, inflicting him with arthritis and obesity that rendered him physically incapable of escaping. Deadpool manages to free Alex with the help of Bob, Agent of Hydra. Agent X asks Deadpool to run Agency X while he gets himself back in shape.

== Powers and abilities ==
Agent X possesses a superhuman healing factor, allowing him to regenerate damaged or destroyed bodily tissue with far greater speed and efficiency than an ordinary human. Agent X is able to heal injuries such as slashes, puncture wounds, bullet wounds, and severe burns within moments. His healing factor is developed to the point that he can regrow and reattach missing limbs and organs. His healing factor has allowed him to survive even brain punctures on numerous occasions. With this superior healing factor, he has shown a unique tolerance towards pain. His body is highly resistant to most drugs and toxins. For example, it is extremely difficult, though not impossible, for him to become intoxicated. He can, however, be affected by certain drugs, such as tranquilizers, if he is exposed to a massive enough dosage. Agent X's healing factor also extends to his immune system, rendering him immune to the effects of all known diseases and infections. Agent X's healing factor provides him with an extended lifespan by slowing the effects of the aging process to an unknown degree. The healing factor causes his brain cells to be in a constant state of flux and regeneration, rendering him immune to psychic intrusions.

Because of his healing factor, Agent X can push his muscles to levels beyond the natural limits of an ordinary human being without sustaining injury, giving him superhuman strength. He is capable of lifting in more than 800 lbs and is shown to lift up to 3 tons. The exact limit of his strength is unknown. His musculature generates considerably less fatigue toxins than the muscles of an ordinary human being, granting him superhuman levels of stamina in all physical activities. He can physically exert himself at peak capacity for at least 18 hours before fatigue begins to impair him. His agility, balance, and bodily coordination are enhanced to levels that are beyond the natural physical limits of even the finest human athlete, on par with Deadpool. His reflexes are similarly enhanced, superior to those of even the finest human athlete.

Additionally, Agent X was trained by Taskmaster in weapons and combat and is also an expert marksman. The most common weapons Agent X uses are pistols, knives, and throwing stars.

== Reception ==
=== Literary reception ===
Scott Thomas of SlashFilm included the comic book series Agent X in their "10 Deadpool Comic Storylines We'd Love To See In Deadpool 3" list. Shaurya Thapa of Screen Rant ranked the comic book series Agent X 5th in their "10 Comics To Read If You Love The Boys" list, writing, "With enough goofy, cynical comedy, the series is a fun read that is bound to impress fans of Deadpool. [...] the comic is iconic as it preceded Cable & Deadpool, and has gained a cult status over time."

=== Accolades ===
- In 2021, Screen Rant ranked Agent X and Deadpool 7th in their "10 Strangest Friendships In Deadpool Comics" list.
- In 2022, Screen Rant ranked Agent X 5th in their "10 Best Mercenaries In Marvel Comics" list.
