= Deadpool =

Character appearing in Marvel Comics

Wade Wilson Deadpool
- Derived variant cover art of Deadpool #1 (June 2018). Art by Rob Liefeld.

Publication information
- Publisher: Marvel Comics
- First appearance: The New Mutants #98 (February 1991)
- Created by: Rob Liefeld; Fabian Nicieza

In-story information
- Full name: Wade Winston Wilson
- Species: Human mutate (Note: In Marvel Comics, the term "mutate" is used as a noun to designate characters that received superpowers from an external source, as opposed to Marvel's mutants.)
- Team affiliations: X-Men; Avengers; Astonishing Avengers; Deadpool Corps; Frightful Four; Great Lakes Initiative; Heroes for Hire; Mercs for Money; Secret Defenders; Six Pack; Thunderbolts; Weapon X X-Force
- Partnerships: Cable; Domino; Bob, Agent of Hydra; Wolverine; Spider-Man
- Notable aliases: Merc with a Mouth
- Abilities: Superhuman strength, speed, durability, stamina, agility, and reflexes; Regenerative healing factor; Extended longevity; Fourth wall breaks; Skilled marksman, swordsman, martial artist, and hand-to-hand combatant

Deadpool is a character appearing in American comic books published by Marvel Comics. Co-created by artist Rob Liefeld and writer Fabian Nicieza, the character first appeared as a supervillain in The New Mutants #98 (cover dated February 1991) before recurring throughout X-Force and receiving his first miniseries, The Circle Chase, in 1993. Deadpool received his first ongoing solo title in 1997 and has since starred in numerous series, including Cable & Deadpool (2004–2008), in which he is frequently paired with his former enemy Cable.

Deadpool is the persona of Wade Wilson, a disfigured Canadian mercenary who underwent an experimental procedure that grafted an artificial healing factor onto his cancer-ridden cells, granting him superhuman regenerative abilities at the cost of severe physical scarring and chronic mental instability. Originally conceived as a parody of the DC Comics villain Deathstroke, Deadpool was further shaped by Liefeld's admiration for Spider-Man and Wolverine, characters he sought to evoke with his own creations. In addition to his healing factor, Deadpool is a master assassin, an expert swordsman and marksman, and is fluent in multiple languages.

The character's popularity has seen him featured in numerous other media outlets. In the 2004 series Cable & Deadpool, he refers to his own scarred appearance as "Ryan Renolds [sic] crossed with a Shar Pei". Reynolds developed an interest in portraying the character after reading the comic, which was ultimately realized in the X-Men film series, including X-Men Origins: Wolverine (2009), Deadpool (2016), and its sequels Deadpool 2 (2018) and the Marvel Cinematic Universe's Deadpool & Wolverine (2024).

== Publication history ==
=== Creation ===
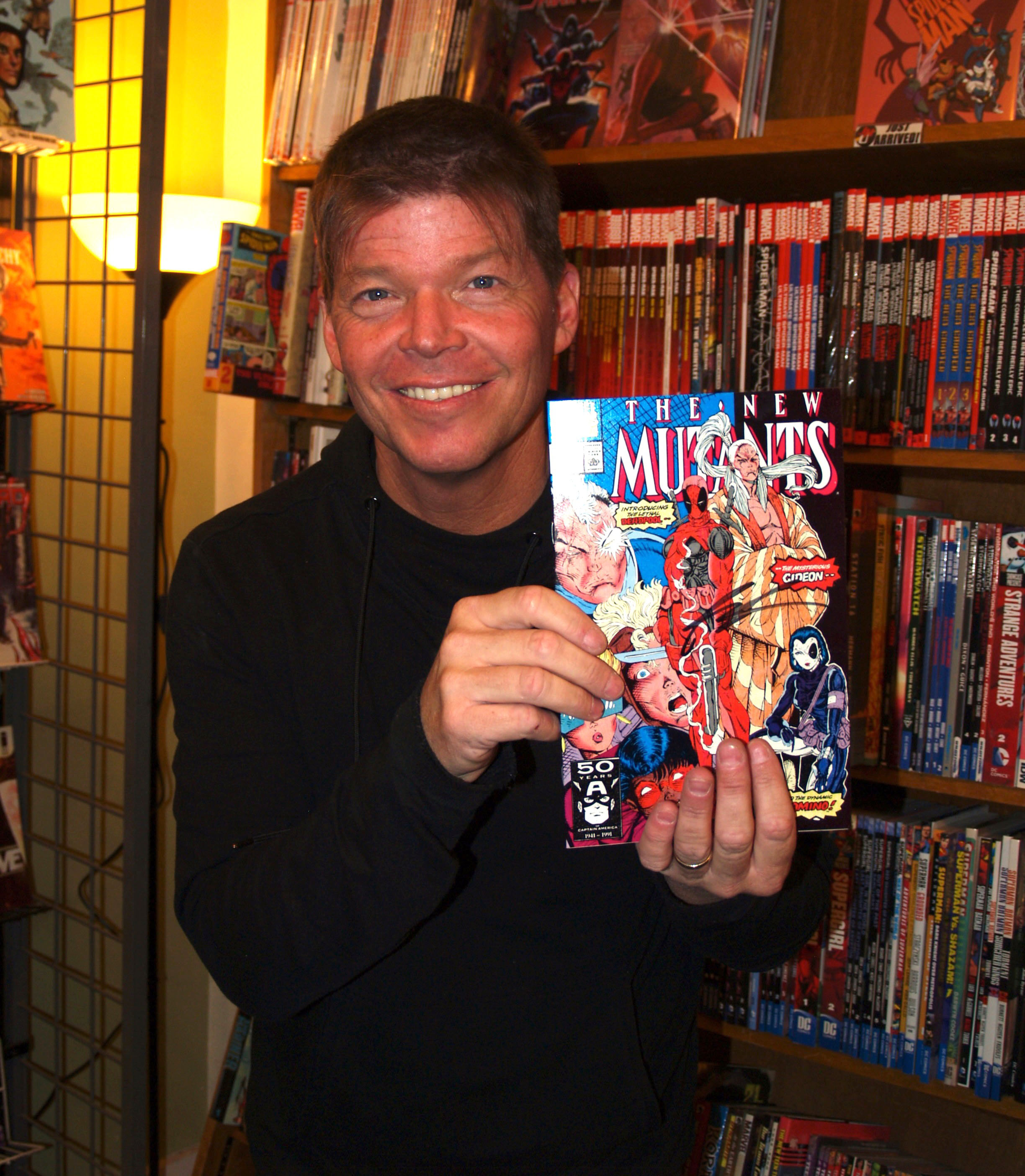
The character's co-creator, Rob Liefeld, holding up a copy of New Mutants #98, in which the character first appeared, during an appearance at JHU Comics in Manhattan held three days before the release of the film Deadpool (2016)

Deadpool was created by artist Rob Liefeld and writer Fabian Nicieza, making his first appearance in The New Mutants #98, published December 11, 1990 with a cover date of February 1991. Liefeld had joined The New Mutants in 1989, tasked with reviving a title that had fallen to approximately 100,000 monthly copies at a time when the core X-Men books were selling in the 500,000 range. Within months of his arrival, sales began climbing by roughly 50,000 copies per month, nearing the sales of the flagship X-Men series. In response, Marvel gave Liefeld with full creative control over plots and new characters, beginning with The New Mutants #98.

The character's name was derived from the dead pool, an expression Liefeld heard from his parents that involves guessing when a celebrity will die. Liefeld was drawn to the sound of the combined term. Deadpool's red and black costume design and personality were inspired by Spider-Man. Liefeld described the Spider-Man design as easy to draw and instantly recognizable. He stated that Deadpool would be "Spider-Man, except with guns and swords—a jackass". The character was further integrated into existing Marvel mythology through his connection to Weapon X, the government program which gave Wolverine his powers. Liefeld conceived of Deadpool as an earlier, flawed product of the same program.

Nicieza was hired to script the series from Liefeld's layouts and plot notes and was given wide latitude in shaping the character's dialogue. He recalled in a 2018 interview that Liefeld described the new character broadly as "Spider-Man meets Punisher" and left the specifics of the voice to Nicieza's discretion. Wanting a change of register after scripting several heavily serious characters, Nicieza made Deadpool an "annoying loudmouth". He initially differentiated the character's speech with hollow-bordered word balloons to signal something unusual about the voice; as lettering technology advanced these became yellow-filled caption boxes rendered in the rough-edged font Spookytooth. The vocal quality Nicieza had in mind was that of comedian Denis Leary.

The character's civilian name, Wade Wilson, originated as an inside joke stemming from Nicieza's comparisons of Deadpool to DC Comics character Deathstroke (Slade Wilson), a fellow masked mercenary. Nicieza has contested characterizations of Deadpool as a parody or copy of Deathstroke, arguing that the name was solely an affectionate nod, and that the two characters differ substantially in personality, backstory, and design.

=== Early appearances and miniseries (1991–1996) ===
The New Mutants #98 sold approximately 650,000 copies, and reader response was substantially above the norm for the title: Nicieza recalled that the issue received roughly three to four hundred letters compared to the title's usual fifty, with approximately 75% requesting the character's return. Marvel acted on this quickly: Deadpool was selected as one of five characters to receive a trading card inserted into X-Force #1 (August 1991), the rebranded successor to The New Mutants with largely the same cast and creative team. Liefeld noted that with five million copies of X-Force #1 sold, each containing one of five different cards, approximately one million copies of the Deadpool card made it into readers' hands. Deadpool's profile was further elevated in X-Force #2, where he featured on the cover and occupied the first twelve pages of the issue. Liefeld attributed this prominent placement directly to fan demand following New Mutants #98. X-Force #1 and #2 were the best-selling comics in the United States in June and July 1991, respectively. Within months of Deadpool's creation, the toy company Toy Biz fast-tracked the character for his own action figure. The character began guest-starring in other Marvel titles. His first appearance outside the X-Men line was in Nomad #4 (August 1992), also written by Nicieza. The first Deadpool story not written by Nicieza appeared in The Avengers #366 (December 1993), scripted by Marvel staff editor and freelance writer Glenn Herdling.

In 1993, Deadpool received his first solo series, the four-issue miniseries Deadpool: The Circle Chase, written by Nicieza and pencilled by Joe Madureira. The series was the first sustained opportunity to develop the character's backstory: Wade Wilson was established as an ordinary mercenary who, on receiving a terminal cancer diagnosis, enrolled in the Weapon X program, which granted him a powerful healing factor but left him disfigured and mentally unstable. Nicieza has cited his mother-in-law's battle with cancer as a personal influence on this aspect of the character, describing the hook as a blend of Bugs Bunny and Frankenstein: the thing that saved Wade's life also made him a pariah. A second miniseries, Deadpool: Sins of the Past (1994), was written by Mark Waid and pencilled by Ian Churchill after editorial rejected Nicieza's proposed follow-up, in which Wade's cancer recurred and he pursued the scientists responsible for his condition, on the grounds that it was too grim. Nicieza later described this rejection as one of the greatest frustrations of a thirty-year career. Waid approached the character primarily as a comedy vehicle, describing his mental model as Bugs Bunny.

Following the second miniseries, commercial interest in Deadpool declined sharply. Marvel Comics simultaneously experienced severe financial difficulties, filing for Chapter 11 bankruptcy in the mid-1990s, which disrupted editorial leadership across the company. Deadpool made approximately a dozen appearances across all Marvel titles in the following three years.

=== First ongoing series (1997–2002) ===
In 1997, Marvel editor Matt Idelson, a fan of the character who secured approval to give it a renewed opportunity, commissioned an ongoing Deadpool series from writer Joe Kelly, who had no prior experience on a monthly title. Wizard Magazine noted that Kelly's appointment prompted internal skepticism, with colleagues questioning how the series could launch with an unestablished writer. Kelly recalled that editorial expected the series might last only six issues. Rather than following the action-centered direction of earlier development pitches, Kelly made comedy and character depth the defining quality of his run. His central conception was of a character who "would like to do the right thing but is constitutionally incapable of pulling that off"; someone for whom doing good was a perpetual aspiration and a perpetual failure, with the universe reliably undermining any success. This interpretation proved influential and has remained a consistent element of the character across subsequent creative teams. Kelly's run also introduced several supporting figures that would recur through later decades of the character's publication history, including Blind Al, an elderly woman who lives with Wade Wilson, and Ajax, the antagonist responsible for Wade's disfigurement at Weapon X. The series' regular artist for much of the run was Ed McGuinness, who had begun his career at Marvel with the Wolverine '96 Annual before joining Deadpool. McGuinness departed the title due to difficulties meeting deadlines.

Earlier portrayals had established Deadpool as a darkly humorous combatant in the mode of a wisecracking action hero. Kelly developed the character into something more unhinged: manic, free-associative, and given to extended comedic monologues that drew on contemporary pop culture and showed no regard for narrative propriety. A frequently cited example of the run is Deadpool #11, in which Kelly and artist Pete Woods reworked a 1967 issue of The Amazing Spider-Man by replacing its original protagonists with Deadpool and Blind Al panel by panel, using the juxtaposition to comment satirically on the conventions of superhero storytelling. The run also introduced a contested-identity subplot in which the supervillain T-Ray claimed to be the real Wade Wilson, asserting that Deadpool was an impostor who had stolen his identity, which complicated the character's backstory and was periodically revisited by later writers. Kelly pitched a storyline tying the series into the "Heroes Return" event, in which Deadpool would have retrieved heroes trapped inside a dimensional construct and temporarily carried them under his arm, but the concept was rejected by editorial as too ambitious for a new series written by an unestablished author.

Despite the creative energy Kelly brought to the title, sales were sluggish throughout his tenure. Wizard reported in late 1998 that the series had been "under the cancellation gun" until a coordinated marketing initiative, branded "Deadpool Month", reversed its trajectory. Staged in October 1998 to coincide with the series' second-year milestone, Deadpool Month included a double-sized anniversary issue (Deadpool #23), a three-issue storyline building to a double-sized Deadpool #25, a promotional Deadpool #0 distributed through Wizard magazine, an Encyclopedia Deadpoolica reference publication, and a one-shot tie-in. The success of the Daredevil/Deadpool Annual '97, a team-up issue that Marvel described as a benchmark, prompted the publisher to plan similar annual crossovers in subsequent years.

Writer Christopher Priest succeeded Kelly in 1999. From his opening issue, Priest extended the metafictional dimension of the character, which Kelly had introduced more obliquely, with Deadpool being aware that he is a fictional character. Priest departed the series in 2000. By mid-2001, monthly sales had fallen to approximately 24,000 copies, against roughly 100,000 for the top-selling X-Men title of the same period.

Writer Gail Simone was brought on in 2002. Her opening issue generated strong positive attention, but Marvel cancelled the series before her run could develop, replacing it with Agent X, also written by Simone. Agent X followed a similarly scarred and sardonic mercenary who was not Wade Wilson. The change coincided with a publisher-wide reorganisation of X-Men-related titles and an unspecified dispute involving one of Deadpool's co-creators, though the specifics were not publicly disclosed at the time. Simone departed Agent X after its seventh issue following creative disagreements with the incoming editor; the series was cancelled after fifteen issues, with Wade Wilson making a brief reappearance in its final installments.

=== Cable & Deadpool and commercial stagnation (2004–2008) ===
In 2004, Nicieza returned to the character with Cable & Deadpool, a series that paired Deadpool with his former adversary Cable, across fifty issues. Nicieza recalled approaching the assignment by deliberately avoiding prior Deadpool material for approximately a decade, wanting to arrive at his own interpretation of the character before drawing on other writers' contributions. Though the series provided substantial material for both characters, it consistently ranked near the lower end of the top 100 monthly comics by sales. It was cancelled with its fiftieth issue in 2008, replaced by a new Cable solo series. Nicieza incorporated significant fourth-wall material into the run, including monthly recap pages written in Deadpool's voice. By the time of its cancellation, the character's commercial standing appeared substantially diminished, and the prospects for further solo publication were uncertain.

=== Resurgence (2008–2012) ===
With Cable & Deadpool concluded, Marvel editor Axel Alonso and writer Daniel Way, who had discussed the character's underperformance independently, collaborated on a new ongoing Deadpool series launched in September 2008. The new series was positioned as a tie-in to the publisher-wide "Secret Invasion" crossover event, with its opening arc depicting Deadpool infiltrating a Skrull facility at the behest of Nick Fury to retrieve intelligence on the Skrull queen Veranke. Alonso's stated mandate was to foreground the "sophomoric, anarchic humor" he regarded as central to the character. Way's stated version of the brief was more succinct: the character had "flatlined," and the task was simply to generate reader interest.

The series proved a significant commercial surprise. Its debut issue placed seventeenth on the monthly sales charts and sold out; several subsequent issues also required additional printings. Average monthly sales during the series' first year reached approximately 55,000 copies, which was substantially higher than the character had achieved in years. Those involved, including Way, acknowledged that the reasons for the turnaround were not fully understood at the time. One factor proposed by industry observers was the character's particular compatibility with emerging internet and social media culture: his referential, rapidly shifting comedic sensibility was seen as well-suited to the attention economy of online fandom. Series artist Paco Medina worked alongside Way on the title, with Carlo Barberi filling in on individual arcs.

Among Way's contributions to the character was a pair of internal voices represented by differently formatted caption boxes. Rather than the conventional angel-and-devil formulation, both voices were written as morally compromised, functioning to dramatise the character's mental instability and triangulate his moral perspective. Way described the guiding internal phrase for his approach as "Madness is his method." This device was later incorporated into the character's official continuity in Deadpool vol. 3 Annual #1 (2014), where one of the voices was retroactively identified as belonging to the villain Madcap. Way also foregrounded Deadpool's cancer as thematic material, arguing that it was integral to the character's identity: the coexistence of a superhuman healing factor and an active cancer produced what Way called "a walking dead man ... perpetually living and dying."

Marvel responded to the character's renewed commercial performance with an unprecedented multiplication of Deadpool-branded titles. Between 2009 and 2012, eleven distinct ongoing or limited series starring the character ran concurrently or in rapid succession, a volume unmatched in the publisher's history for a single character. These included Deadpool: Merc with a Mouth (2009), written by Victor Gischler; Deadpool Team-Up (2009), written by Fred Van Lente; and Deadpool Corps (2010), again by Gischler, which centred on alternate-universe iterations of Deadpool. Two titles were published under adult-targeted imprints: Deadpool: Wade Wilson's War, written by Duane Swierczynski, and Deadpool MAX, written by David Lapham. The limited series Deadpool Kills the Marvel Universe sold strongly and expanded the character's readership beyond regular Marvel continuity. Industry analysts cited Deadpool as having become one of the publisher's most commercially significant properties. The character's popularity also translated into substantial merchandising revenue and a prominent presence at comics conventions, where Deadpool cosplay became among the most frequently observed.

=== Marvel Now! (2012-2015) ===
As part of Marvel's 2012 "Marvel NOW!" line-wide initiative, Deadpool was relaunched under writers Gerry Duggan and Brian Posehn. The assignment originated when Alonso emailed both writers directly, asking them to connect with editor Jordan D. White to pitch for a new ongoing. The series had previously been discussed as a possible miniseries, but the timing had never aligned. Duggan and Posehn prepared multiple story pitches; their opening arc, "Dead Presidents", in which Deadpool is recruited by S.H.I.E.L.D. to re-kill the supernaturally reanimated corpses of every former United States president, was the last pitch they submitted and the one they least expected Marvel to accept.

The first three issues of the relaunched series went to multiple printings. At convention appearances shortly after launch, Duggan noted that a significant proportion of readers described the new series as either their first Deadpool comic or their first in a long while, suggesting the relaunch had attracted readers beyond the character's existing base. The opening arc was drawn by Tony Moore; Mike Hawthorne joined the series as artist from issue #8 onwards.

One of the more notable structural decisions Duggan and Posehn made at launch was to depart from the caption-box approach Way had used throughout his run. Posehn acknowledged in a pre-launch interview that Deadpool "doesn't talk to himself anymore", a change that prompted early complaints from readers who missed the thought balloons. Rather than restoring the device mechanically, the writers developed an organic narrative replacement: in the second arc, the consciousness of S.H.I.E.L.D. agent Emily Preston becomes lodged in Deadpool's mind following her death in the field, providing the internal counterpoint previously served by the caption voices. Duggan described the writers' tonal target with Ghostbusters as a reference point: comedy that did not preclude emotional stakes or character depth.

Major storylines across the run included "The Good, the Bad and the Ugly," in which Deadpool's backstory was substantially expanded and his friendship with Steve Rogers was established; the digital-first miniseries Deadpool: The Gauntlet (2014), written by Duggan and Posehn with art by Reilly Brown, which introduced Shiklah, Queen of the Undead, and culminated in her marriage to Wade; and a tie-in to the "Original Sin" event, which disclosed that Deadpool had been unknowingly manipulated into killing his own parents. The run's final issue was numbered #250 (a renumbering from issue #45) to leapfrog Detective Comics before that series could reach its own milestone legitimately, itself treated in coverage of the time as a characteristically Deadpool-esque provocation.

=== All-New, All-Different Marvel and Despicable Deadpool (2015–2018) ===
Following the conclusion of the previous volume in the "Secret Wars" crossover event, Duggan launched a new Deadpool series in October 2015 as part of Marvel's "All-New, All-Different" initiative. Despite the solo writing credit, Duggan confirmed that Posehn remained a creative collaborator on the title, with Posehn's increasing commitments elsewhere accounting for the change in billing. Series artist Mike Hawthorne and inker Terry Pallot continued from the prior volume, with Scott Koblish providing special issues, now reimagined as flash-forwards rather than the period-pastiche flashbacks he had produced previously.

The series opened with an eight-month time jump into the characters' future. Deadpool was now one of the Marvel Universe's most publicly visible and commercially successful heroes, and, more surprisingly, an Avenger. This elevated status came with costs. Deadpool was now more publicly accountable and more financially entwined with the Avengers than ever before, and the series used that exposure to put pressure on him in ways earlier volumes had not. Steve Rogers served as a significant supporting character. Their friendship, which Duggan had seeded in "The Good, the Bad and the Ugly" and developed in a Death of Wolverine one-shot, was here placed at the center of Wade's professional life: Rogers's Avengers Unity Squad was partly financed by the revenue Deadpool generated through merchandising and licensing deals.

In early 2017, the crossover "Till Death Do Us...", written by Duggan with artist Salva Espin, ran across Deadpool #28–29 and continued through tie-in issues of Spider-Man/Deadpool and Deadpool & the Mercs for Money. The arc brought Shiklah and Wade's marriage to its breaking point, driven by a border conflict between Monster Metropolis and the surface world. From May 2017, Deadpool was drawn into the "Secret Empire" event, in which a Hydra sleeper agent had supplanted Steve Rogers. Deadpool's loyalty to the corrupted Rogers, and the deaths and betrayals that resulted, were the subject of the arc immediately following the crossover. The volume concluded with Despicable Deadpool (#287–300), a branding introduced after "Secret Empire" to reflect Wade's severely diminished standing in the Marvel Universe and his attempts to operate in its aftermath.

=== Skottie Young and Kelly Thompson (2018–2021) ===
In March 2018, Marvel announced a new Deadpool series as part of its "Fresh Start" publishing initiative, written by Skottie Young and drawn by Nic Klein, with Deadpool 2 (2018) releasing in cinemas weeks before the series' June 6, 2018 launch. Young disclosed that he had first attempted to secure the Deadpool assignment in 2013, before the Posehn-Duggan run had concluded, but had been told the character was already committed to another creative team. He subsequently channelled elements of that interest into his Rocket Raccoon run.

Series editor Jake Thomas framed the new volume as a deliberate reset after years of Deadpool functioning as a high-profile Avenger: "Deadpool's gone through A LOT these past few years, and while he's accomplished a lot, the merc with the mouth may have taken his eye off his mercenary business for a bit too long." The series returned Wade to private mercenary work, with Young employing shorter story arcs and a faster narrative pace. Klein, primarily known as a painted-cover artist prior to the series, described his approach as focusing on comedic visual timing; experimenting with camera angles and panel pacing to land jokes as well as the script's action. The series ran for fifteen issues.

A new Deadpool volume launched in November 2019, written by Kelly Thompson and drawn by Chris Bachalo. Thompson had previously written Deadpool in ensemble titles and noted the specific challenge this presented: the character's tendency to dominate any scene made him difficult to deploy as a supporting player, and she described writing a solo title as "a relief" by comparison.

The series' central conceit had Deadpool become the king of Marvel's monsters, who had relocated from their traditional offshore habitats to Staten Island. Thompson described the premise as using literal monsters to give physical form to the metaphorical: "Wade has worn so many different roles over the years and I think he's a character that really looks inward at himself…even if he pretends he doesn't. So being a King of Monsters brings up a lot of questions that you maybe don't want to examine for yourself…but probably should." Kraven the Hunter, newly redesigned, served as the antagonist of the opening arc, drawn to Staten Island by the prospect of hunting monsters. The monster-based framework also prompted Thompson to incorporate Elsa Bloodstone, whom she described as having not been part of the initial plan but as an obvious fit once the story's shape was clear, developing into a romantic storyline between the two characters. Jeff the Land Shark, a character Thompson had introduced in her West Coast Avengers run, also featured prominently in the series. Thompson described Deadpool as "one of the most lonely characters in the entire Marvel Universe" and oriented the run's emotional core around that quality. The series concluded after ten issues in January 2021.

=== Alyssa Wong (2022–2023) ===
A new Deadpool ongoing series launched on November 2, 2022, written by Alyssa Wong and drawn by Martín Cóccolo, with colors by Neeraj Menon. Wong described the assignment as originating in a conversation with editor Jordan White about which X-books she would be interested in writing: discussing what excited her about the character, she found herself articulating the premise for the series before recognizing that the opportunity was already hers.

Wong identified body horror and shoujo romance as the conceptual core of her run. The horror dimension drew on Deadpool's healing factor as a vehicle for suffering rather than protection; the premise being, as Wong put it, that there are "plenty of interesting things you can put someone through without killing them," and that exploiting the character's unkillability until it became "awful and terrifying" was productive creative territory. She cited the Japanese horror manga of Junji Ito, particularly Tomie, as a key influence. The romantic dimension centered on a new character, Valentine Vuong, introduced as both Deadpool's point of contact with the series' central organization and as a love interest, with Wong framing the emotional stakes as Deadpool's difficulty accepting being genuinely liked by someone.

The central antagonistic organization of the series was the Atelier, a secretive, high-end assassins' collective with strict membership criteria and a pronounced sense of personal style, which Wong described as what would result if a group of elite killers decided to dress like the Hellfire Gala every day. The opening arc's assigned target was Doctor Octopus. The series also reintroduced Harrower, a villain co-created by Steve Orlando and Carmen Carnero, whose abilities in biological fusion Wong identified as particularly suited to a body-horror narrative. Cóccolo was praised by Wong in multiple interviews for his range across tenderness and extreme physical action, and for his comedic visual timing. Wong approached the run as a clean slate accessible to new readers while retaining continuity with prior character developments, including Princess, a symbiote introduced by the preceding creative team, and the aftermath of Deadpool's dissolved marriage to Shiklah.

=== Cody Ziglar and Benjamin Percy (2024-present) ===
A further Deadpool ongoing series launched in 2024, written by Cody Ziglar and drawn by Rogê Antônio, with colors by Guru-eFX. The series was positioned in part to capitalize on the theatrical release of Deadpool & Wolverine. Ziglar has attributed his securing of the assignment to a short story he contributed to the Seven Slaughters miniseries, which generated sufficient confidence at Marvel for the ongoing to be offered. He cited Wong's preceding run as a direct influence on his own pitch, particularly the introduction of Valentine Vuong and Princess.

Ziglar's approach centered on Deadpool as a struggling small businessman rather than as a high-profile hero or Avenger; the premise being what happens to a character of Deadpool's reputation and skillset when the main business he has to manage is keeping solvent. A significant supporting role was given to Deadpool's daughter Ellie, now a teenager who actively resists her father's attempts to keep her at a safe distance, insisting on a real relationship with him. The run's central antagonist was Death Grip, a new villain who had built a cult around the concept of death; a villain whose entire worldview centered on death, a natural antagonist for a protagonist who cannot die. Guest appearances were planned across the run, including Spider-Gwen, the Hulk, and Wolverine. Concurrent with Ziglar's ongoing, Deadpool's co-creator Rob Liefeld produced Deadpool Team-Up (2024), a limited series pairing Deadpool with obscure and legacy Marvel characters, including Crystar and Dragon Lord, as well as Wolverine, Spider-Gwen, and Liefeld creations Major X and Lady Anime. Liefeld described the project in retrospective terms as his likely final Deadpool work, framing it as analogous to the 1970s Marvel Team-Up format in which popular characters were used to spotlight lesser-known corners of the Marvel roster.

Writer Benjamin Percy, who had previously written Deadpool in supporting roles across his X-Force run, was commissioned to write a ten-issue limited series, Deadpool/Wolverine, drawn by Josh Cassara, with Mark Basso as editor. Percy described the assignment as a natural extension of a long creative partnership with Cassara, who had collaborated with him on X-Force and X Lives and X Deaths of Wolverine. The series was designed to function as an accessible, largely self-contained action narrative, what Percy and Basso described as an "evergreen" story with an '80s and '90s action thriller sensibility, while remaining consistent with the wider Marvel continuity. The opening arc featured Stryfe as the primary antagonist, revisiting elements of the 1990s storyline "X-Cutioner's Song", with anti-mutant agency Director Talyn as a secondary figure. Percy articulated his interpretation of Deadpool's comedy as rooted in psychological necessity, stating: "Many comedians are deeply damaged, and humor is a survival instinct. That's how I think of Wade. He's armoring himself with laughs because he's so emotionally and physically scarred."

Following the conclusion of Deadpool/Wolverine, Percy continued with an ongoing solo series, Wade Wilson: Deadpool, also drawn by Geoff Shaw and edited by Basso, as part of the "X-Men: Shadows of Tomorrow" publishing slate. The series title was chosen deliberately to foreground the man rather than the mercenary persona: Percy and Basso described their intent as wanting to "dig our thumb into his wounded humanity." The tonal approach positioned Deadpool's humor against a world that does not share it: "Deadpool might be cracking jokes, but the world is dead serious," Percy explained. "Everyone else views him as a damaged lunatic." Percy identified Blind Al as the series' moral anchor, arguing that Deadpool requires a grounding figure to give his otherwise directionless moral compass something to point toward. The opening arc's antagonist was Hammerhead, a gangster-level threat rather than a cosmic or superhero-scale villain, consistent with the run's street-level register.

In 2025, Deadpool became the Marvel character chosen for the first sustained Marvel–DC publishing crossover since JLA/Avengers (2003–2004). The two publishers produced mirrored one-shot issues: Deadpool/Batman, written by Zeb Wells with art by Greg Capullo, and Batman/Deadpool, written by Grant Morrison with art by Dan Mora. Wells set the Marvel one-shot in Gotham City, with Wade Wilson hired for a job that draws Batman's attention and the Joker as the central antagonist. Morrison and Mora handled the DC-published counterpart.

Marvel president Dan Buckley described the decision to pair Deadpool with Batman as a straightforward tonal judgment: the combination offered both comedy and elevated violence, and Deadpool's sensibility was considered well-suited to destabilizing Batman's more serious register. DC president and publisher Jim Lee characterised the timing of the crossover as a generational phenomenon: "It happens kind of once every generation of readers." Both executives noted the logistical complexity of aligning two publishers' editorial schedules years in advance, and announced that a further set of Marvel–DC crossover one-shots was planned for 2026.

== Characterization ==
=== Personality and motivations ===
Deadpool is aware that he is a fictional comic book character. He commonly breaks the fourth wall, which is done by few other characters in the Marvel Universe, and this is used to humorous effect, for instance, by having Deadpool converse with his own "inner monologue", represented by caption boxes. In stories by writer Daniel Way between 2008 and 2012, Deadpool was, without explanation, shown to have developed a second "voice in his head", represented by a second set of captions with a different font; Deadpool vol. 3 Annual #1 (2014) would retroactively explain that this voice belonged to Madcap, a psychotic Captain America villain, who had become molecularly entangled with Deadpool.

The character's back-story has been presented as vague and subject to change, and within the narrative, he is unable to remember his personal history due to a mental condition. Whether or not his name was even Wade Wilson is subject to speculation since one of his nemeses, T-Ray, claims in Deadpool #33 that he is the real Wade Wilson and that Deadpool is a vicious murderer who stole his identity. There have been other dubious stories about his history—at one point the supervillain Loki claimed to be his father. Frequently, revelations are later retconned or ignored altogether, and in one issue, Deadpool himself joked that whether or not he is actually Wade Wilson depends on which writer the reader prefers.

Deadpool's rapid cellular regeneration grants him immortality and severe mental instability, as the accelerated healing process constantly damages and regrows his brain cells. It is thought that while his psychosis is a handicap, it is also one of his assets as it makes him an extremely unpredictable opponent. Taskmaster, who has photo-reflexive memory which allows him to copy anyone's fighting skills by observation, was unable to defeat Deadpool due to his chaotic and improvised fighting style. Taskmaster has also stated that Deadpool is an expert at distracting his opponents.

Deadpool has sometimes been portrayed to have a strong sense of core morality. In Uncanny X-Force, he storms out after Wolverine tries to rationalize Fantomex killing Apocalypse, who was at the time in a child form. After Wolverine argues that Deadpool is motivated solely by money, Archangel reveals that Deadpool never cashed any of his checks.

==== Sexual orientation ====
In December 2013, Deadpool was confirmed as being pansexual by Deadpool writer Gerry Duggan via Twitter. However, this post on Twitter has since been deleted by Gerry Duggan. When asked about Deadpool's sexuality, co-creator Fabian Nicieza stated, "Deadpool is whatever sexual inclination his brain tells him he is in THAT moment. And then the moment passes." Nicieza has also stated,

Not trying to be dismissive, but readers always want to 'make a character their own', and often that is to the exclusion of what the character might mean to other fans. I've been dogged with the DP sexuality questions for YEARS. It is a bit tiring. He is NO sex and ALL sexes. He is yours and everyone else's. So not dismissive, but rather the epitome of inclusive.

=== Powers, abilities, and equipment ===
Deadpool's primary power is an accelerated healing factor, depicted by various writers at differing levels of efficiency. The speed of his healing factor depends on the severity of the wound and Deadpool's mental state. It works most efficiently when he is awake, alert, and in good spirits. Deadpool's accelerated healing factor is strong enough that he has survived complete incineration and decapitation more than once. Although his head normally has to be reunited with his body to heal a decapitation wound, he was able to regrow his head after having it pulverized by the Hulk in the graphic novel Deadpool Kills the Marvel Universe.

Deadpool's brain cells are similarly affected, with dying neurons being rejuvenated at a super accelerated rate. This allows Deadpool to recover from any head wounds, and it renders him nearly invulnerable to psychic and telepathic powers, although this ability is inconsistent. It has been revealed that at the time his healing ability was given to him, Deadpool suffered from some form of cancer; after the healing factor was given to him, it made his normal cells as well as his cancerous cells unable to die, giving him a heavily scarred appearance beneath his suit.

Deadpool's body is highly resistant to most drugs and toxins, due to his accelerated healing factor. For example, it is extremely difficult for him to become intoxicated. He can be affected by certain drugs, such as tranquilizers if he is exposed to a large enough dosage. Unlike Wolverine, Deadpool has some degree of pain insensitivity, often referring to his gore and impalement injuries as being "ticklish".

Deadpool is effectively immortal, although he has died several times. He is still alive 800 years in the future when the new X-Force encounters him. In addition, Thanos once declared that Deadpool should "consider yourself cursed ... with life!" out of jealousy over Deadpool's status as Death's love interest. His enemy T-Ray later resurrected him, under Thanos' instruction, using an artifact he had given him. Later, Deadpool was informed that Thanos had placed a curse on him, and tracked Thanos down. He revealed that the only thing keeping Wade alive was his "spell of darkest necromancy". Although Thanos removed this curse in order to kill Deadpool, he felt forced to immediately bring him back using "a fusion of necromancy and science" in order to request his aid in tracking down Mistress Death, who had gone missing.

Deadpool is a highly trained assassin and mercenary. He is adept in multiple forms of martial arts, including Savate. Deadpool is an extraordinary athlete, and an expert swordsman and marksman. He is skilled in the use of multiple weapons, including katanas, knives, grenades, and guns. His accelerated healing factor may contribute to his abilities, allowing him to perform the intense exercise for extended periods of time with minimal aches and fatigue. Although he was originally portrayed as having superhuman strength, he is no longer depicted as having this ability.

Over the years, Deadpool has owned a number of personal teleportation devices. During his first ongoing comic book series, he also possesses a device that projects holographic disguises, allowing him to go undercover or conceal his appearance. Additionally, Deadpool is multilingual, with the ability to speak fluently in German, Spanish, American Sign Language (ASL), and Japanese, in addition to his native English.

Since Deadpool is aware that he is a fictional character, he uses this knowledge to his advantage to deal with opponents or gain knowledge to which he should not normally have access, such as reading past issues of his and others' comics.

== Supporting characters ==
=== Romantic interests ===
Deadpool has had many romantic interests, most of them brief or otherwise complicated by the demands of his mercenary life. Vanessa Carlysle, a mutant shape-shifter who later operated as Copycat, was romantically involved with Wade Wilson before his Weapon X experimentation; their history resurfaced when she was exposed while impersonating Domino within Cable's X-Force team. During Joe Kelly's ongoing series, the X-Man Siryn became a significant romantic interest; she was among the few characters to engage with Deadpool as a person rather than a mercenary, and the relationship ended when he slept with Typhoid Mary under the mistaken belief she was Siryn.

Deadpool also developed feelings for Death, the Marvel Universe's personified embodiment of mortality, first encountered during his torture sessions at the Weapon X facility. Thanos, himself a long-time pursuer of Death, arranged for Deadpool to be cursed with immortality through the sorcerer T-Ray to prevent him from ever reaching her, as depicted in Deadpool and Death Annual #1 (1998), written by Kelly. The infatuation has resurfaced in several later runs, including the 2020 one-shot Deadpool: The End, again written by Kelly.

His most prominent relationship was with Shiklah, Queen of the Undead, introduced in the digital-first Deadpool: The Gauntlet (2014) by Gerry Duggan and Brian Posehn. Hired by Dracula to deliver Shiklah to him as a bride, Deadpool and Shiklah fell for each other instead and married in Deadpool #27 (2014). The marriage ended through Duggan's 2017 crossover "Till Death Do Us...", with Shiklah returning to Dracula. During Duggan's subsequent All-New, All-Different run, Rogue and Deadpool had a brief involvement while serving together on the Avengers Unity Squad. Kelly Thompson's 2019–21 series introduced Elsa Bloodstone as a romantic subplot, pairing two characters with comparable moral flexibility and violent professional lives. Alyssa Wong's 2022 series introduced Valentine Vuong, a non-binary mutant assassin, as Deadpool's love interest, with Wong framing the relationship around his difficulty accepting genuine affection from someone who sees him clearly.

== Other versions ==
=== Age of Apocalypse ===
An alternate universe version of Deadpool appears in Age of Apocalypse. This version is Dead Man Wade, a bitter, humorless member of Apocalypse's Pale Riders who received his flawed healing factor from Apocalypse's eugenics program. After an attempt to attack the Savage Land, Wade is killed by Nightcrawler, who teleports his head off his body and hides it in a crater. Wade is later revealed to be resurrected like many of the other Alpha mutants.

=== Apocalypse Wars ===
In the Extraordinary X-Men Apocalypse Wars crossover, Deadpool is a Horseman of Apocalypse.

=== Captain America: Who Won't Wield the Shield ===
The World War II-era version of Deadpool is introduced in the one-shot parody issue Captain America: Who Won't Wield the Shield. Frederick "Wheezy" Wilson, the nephew of President Woodrow Wilson, is a soldier who is experimented on by the Nazis to become 'Veapon X'. Despite the nature of the story as a period piece, Wilson peppers his speech with anachronistic slang from the 1990s.

=== Deadpool Killology ===
==== Deadpool Kills the Marvel Universe ====
In the storyline Deadpool Kills the Marvel Universe, the X-Men send Deadpool to a mental hospital for therapy. The doctor treating him is actually Psycho-Man in disguise, who attempts to torture and brainwash Deadpool into becoming his personal minion. The procedure fails but leaves Deadpool even more mentally unhinged, erasing the "serious" and "Screwball" voices in his head and replacing them with a voice that only wants destruction. Under "Evil Voice's" influence, Deadpool develops a more nihilistic world view, leading him to kill every superhero and supervillain on Earth in an attempt to rebel against his creators. The book ends with Deadpool breaking into the "real" world and confronting the Marvel writers and artists who are writing the book. He says to the reader that he will target them once he is done with this universe.

==== Deadpool Killustrated ====
After the events of Deadpool Kills the Marvel Universe, Deadpool has killed many versions of Marvel superheroes and villains across the multiverse to no effect and comes to a conclusion that infinite alternate versions of the heroes and villains he killed exist. In response, Deadpool hires a team of scientists to help him get rid of all Marvel characters. The Mad Thinker gives Deadpool a device that transports him to the "Ideaverse", a universe that contains the classic characters that inspired Marvel characters. In each book, he hunts down and murders characters such as the Headless Horseman (who inspired the Green Goblin and Ghost Rider), the characters of Little Women (Black Widow, She-Hulk, Elektra), Captain Ahab (Thunderbolt Ross), the Little Mermaid (Namor), Mowgli (Ka-Zar), Count Dracula (Dracula, Morbius, and Blade) and more. He also installs his own brain into Frankenstein's monster, giving his dark inner voice a body to help him with. Sherlock Holmes and Dr. Watson enlist Beowulf, Hua Mulan and Natty Bumppo to stop him.

==== Deadpool Kills Deadpool ====
On April 4, 2013, Cullen Bunn revealed that, following the publication of Deadpool Killustrated, the next and last part of the "Deadpool Killology" is Deadpool Kills Deadpool, stating that the murderous, nihilistic Deadpool that appeared in Deadpool Kills the Marvel Universe and Killustrated is now called "Dreadpool" and, in the series, he hunts down all versions of Deadpool, while "our" Deadpool, the light-hearted Merc With A Mouth, hunted down Dreadpool. Bunn stated that the Deadpool Corps appeared along with many other versions of Deadpool and new versions. The first book was released in July 2013. The first issue opens with Deadpool dealing with yet another attack by ULTIMATUM, after which the Deadpool Corps quickly ropes the titular character into the crisis. Over the course of the storyline, the Deadpool Corps is killed (not including Headpool, who was already killed prior to the events of the storyline), and it concludes in Issue #4, where Deadpool clashes with Dreadpool, who is eventually shown the error of his ways and killed by Deadpool in vengeance for causing the death of his friends. Somehow, the mainstream Deadpool finds his way back, but not before the reader is aware that Dreadpool is still alive and scheming.

==== Deadpool Kills the Marvel Universe Again ====
In the storyline Deadpool Kills the Marvel Universe Again, in another universe diverging from the events of Wolverine: Old Man Logan, the villains of the world elect to use a brainwashed Deadpool instead of Wolverine to wipe out the X-Men, and in-turn all the other heroes of the world. Once Mr. Knight's assistant Gwen Poole realises what is going on, she uses his trigger word to set Deadpool against the villains instead.

=== Deadpool: Merc with a Mouth ===
Several alternate incarnations of Deadpool are introduced in the series Deadpool: Merc with a Mouth. Attempting to return Headpool to the Marvel Zombies universe, Deadpool encounters multiple versions of himself as they exist in other universes, including a female version of himself named Lady Deadpool, Major Wade Wilson, a militant but sane version of Deadpool, and The Deadpool Kid (KidPool), a cowboy version of Deadpool who exists within a universe resembling the Wild West.

=== Deadpool Pulp ===
Deadpool Pulp is a four-issue limited series from writers Mike Benson and Adam Glass and artist Laurence Campbell, with Deadpool set in the 1950s drawing on pulp fiction (similar to the Marvel Noir fictional universe). This version of Wade is a World War II veteran broken by torture who is recruited by Cable and Stryfe to take down the traitor Outlaw. This version retains his twin katanas and wears a ninja style mask.

=== Deadpool: Samurai ===
In the manga series Deadpool: Samurai, which takes place on Earth-346, Deadpool travels to Japan and joins Samurai Squad, the Japanese division of the Avengers. While he is a member of Samurai Squad, Deadpool battles villains such as Loki and Thanos.

=== "Heroes Reborn" ===
In an alternate reality depicted in the 2021 Heroes Reborn miniseries, Deadpool is the mallet-wielding sidekick of the Goblin and an enemy of Nighthawk.

=== House of M ===
In the House of M reality, Wade Wilson is a field commander and active agent of S.H.I.E.L.D.

=== Hulked-Out Heroes ===
Appearing first in Hulk vol. 2 #21, Deadpool is "hulked-out" near the end of the Fall of the Hulks storyline. A two-part miniseries called, World War Hulks: Hulked Out Heroes followed Hulkpool as he travels back in time to kill himself, disrupting the origin stories of many heroes as he goes.

=== Identity Wars ===
When Deadpool, Spider-Man, and Hulk went to another universe, Deadpool encounters Death Wish who looked like Deadpool but the red part of his costume was green. Deadpool and Death Wish started hanging out with each other and having a lot of fun until Wade Wilson of this universe named Death Mask came in and killed Death Wish who was revealed to be the Victor von Doom of this universe gone crazy. Then Deadpool vowed revenge against Death Mask for killing Death Wish and killed all of the members of Death Mask's group. After that Deadpool defeated Death Mask by throwing a bomb at him, which knocked him out. Deadpool started impersonating Death Mask until he and the other Heroes went back to their universe.

=== Marvel 2099 ===
In the potential future of Marvel 2099, Deadpool is Warda Wilson, the daughter of Deadpool and Shiklah. She collaborates with a gang inspired by Bob, Agent of Hydra, and is wanted by the police. She has taken an older Wade prisoner and forces him to watch political debates while chained up, angered that he has ruined her life and hopes she can use him to find her mother. Wade reveals he and Shiklah had a falling out after the death of Ellie, which led to a battle between the two former lovers in Hell. The new Deadpool is also being pursued by a woman who wears a costume that looks like Wade's Zenpool identity. The mysterious woman rescues Wade and gives him access to her bike to a hologram Preston. She then battles Warda and is revealed to be Ellie, who plans to reclaim the Deadpool name. Wade and Preston break into the old hideout of the Uncanny Avengers for Wade to gear up. Warda and Ellie continue fighting until Warda reveals she will unleash a demonic monster unless Ellie does not get Wade to confess where Shiklah is. After Wade and Preston reunite with Ellie, Wade tells Ellie to search for Shiklah's casket at Doc Samson's grave while he and Preston then go to the Little Italy of 2099 to seek the help of one of the few heroes alive in this time period: Iron Fist.

The heroes and Danny's Iron Fists confront Warda in Madison Star Garden, where the Iron Fists fend off the giant monster while Wade tries to prevent his daughters from fighting by promising to tell Warda where Shiklah is. Despite his plea, Warda murders Ellie and takes Wade to the sewer to interrogate him, where Wade reveals that Ellie's mutant ability is to regenerate all at once into her teenage body, allowing her to survive Warda's attack. After Wade, Preston, and Ellie defeat Warda, Wade tells her that he and Shiklah had an on-and-off-again relationship, but were always on the path for war which eventually resulted in her death, as on Earth, those who refuse to co-exist cease to exist (with Wade bringing up the Skrulls to support his point). He implants Preston into Warda's head so she can aid Warda in clearing her conscious and becoming a better person and tells his daughters that they can both be Deadpool. He later tells Ellie that he now plans to travel the world and rid the planet of his old enemies and that Shiklah's resting place is in a shrunken glass coffin located on top of his heart.

=== Marvel 2997 ===
In Messiah War Deadpool is locked in a freezer for eight hundred years. When he escapes he is captured by the armed forces of the few surviving humans left. He helps Cable to get Hope Summers back from Stryfe who is later revealed to be inside this version of Deadpool's head. After seemingly defeating Stryfe, Deadpool is quickly ripped in half and appears to die shortly after.

=== Marvel Zombies ===
In the first Marvel Zombies limited series, a zombie version of Deadpool is seen fighting the Silver Surfer. Deadpool eventually loses his body and appears as a disembodied head beginning in Marvel Zombies 3. This incarnation of Deadpool, frequently referred to as Headpool, entered the mainstream Marvel continuity after being encountered and captured by the original Deadpool in Deadpool: Merc with a Mouth. Along with several other alternate versions of Deadpool, Headpool went on to appear in Deadpool Corps with a propeller beanie mounted to his head, granting him flight.

=== Spider-Man & Deadpool ===
In an alternate future, Spider-Man is an old man who was paralyzed by a Life Model Decoy of Deadpool and lives in a retirement home with an elderly Deadpool. Unknown to Spider-Man, Oldpool was giving his blood to Peter so he would not die due to his old age. In a battle between LMD Deadpools, Oldpool uses a time machine and mistakenly switches places with the mainstream Deadpool. After they got to the main timeline they are reunited with the main Spider-Man and Oldpool. Then after stopping Master Matrix (the LMD master created by Peter's parents) and Chameleon, Old Man Peter and Oldpool fade away to their timeline.

=== Ultimate Marvel ===
The Ultimate Marvel version of Deadpool is Sergeant "Wadey" Wilson, a Gulf War veteran. Depicted as an anti-mutant extremist, he is a cyborg and leader of the Reavers who hunt mutants for sport on a reality TV show. Beneath the mask, Deadpool appears to be a skull with an exposed brain, his skin formed by a transparent shell. He also has the ability to mimic an individual's appearance and voice, though not their powers. Wadey reappears in Deadpool Kills Deadpool (written by Cullen Bunn and released in 2013) as a member of the Evil Deadpool Corps, led by Dreadpool, whose aim was to exterminate alternate versions of Deadpool across the multiverse, including the regular Deadpool Corps. In issue #4, he is killed by the mainstream Deadpool.

=== Venomverse ===
In Edge of Venomverse, Deadpool from another universe investigated a facility where illegal experiments were being performed with parasitic worms. He bonded to the Venom symbiote to expel the worms inside him. In the event, he willingly got consumed by a Poison to act as a double-agent for the Venom army. In the end, he is presumed dead.

=== Weapon X: Days of Future Now ===
In the alternate Earth ending of the Weapon X comic, Deadpool is recruited by Wolverine to be part of a new team of X-Men after the old team is killed. He joins, claiming Wolverine only wants him as the "token human". This version of Deadpool is killed by Agent Zero's acid.

=== What If...? ===
In a What If...? one-shot titled "Demon in the Armor", takes place in Earth-90211, Wade Wilson is hired by Galactus to kill the Beyonder for merging MODOK to Galactus's rear end in exchange for the Community Cube. He is given a weapon called the Recton Expungifier, the only weapon that can kill the Beyonder. When Deadpool tracks down his target to a nightclub, he is enticed into the Beyonder's partying lifestyle, getting Jheri curls in the process. While Deadpool is hanging out with the Beyonder in a flying limousine, Spider-Man breaks into the car and demands the symbiote costume be removed from himself. Beyonder's driver shoots Spider-Man out of the limousine; the symbiote leaves Spider-Man and merges with Deadpool, creating Venompool. However, after years of partying, Beyonder grew tired and throws Venompool out, snapping him out of Beyonder's magic. Venompool attempts to resume his contract and kill the Beyonder, but accidentally pawns the Recton Expungifier. He decides to get himself clean by kidnapping and selling a drunken Tony Stark to A.I.M. Unfortunately, he cannot join any major superhero teams, like the Avengers, Defenders and Fantastic Four because of his curls.

=== X-Men '92 ===
In the Secret Wars setting of Battleworld, based on X-Men: The Animated Series, Deadpool is a member of X-Force.

== Reception ==
=== Critical reception ===
Over the years, Deadpool has been recognized and celebrated in various rankings, each highlighting different aspects of his character. In 2008, Wizard Magazine ranked Deadpool 182nd in their "The 200 Greatest Comic Book Characters of All Time" list, acknowledging his early appeal as a unique anti-hero in the comic world. Similarly, Paste Magazine included Deadpool at 61 in their list of "The 100 Best Comic Book Characters of All Time," highlighting his unique self-awareness in the Marvel Universe, which sets him apart from typical archetypes. By 2014, Deadpool's blend of humor and action had gained significant momentum, leading IGN to rank him 31st in their "Top 100 Comic Book Heroes" list, praising his offbeat nature and sharp wit that set him apart from traditional heroes. Empire similarly noted his importance, placing him 45th in their "50 Greatest Comic Book Characters" list the same year, emphasizing his unpredictable and comedic approach to crime-fighting.

His role within the X-Men universe has also garnered attention, as Entertainment Weekly ranked him 9th in their "Let's rank every X-Man ever" list in 2014, appreciating his unique relationship with the team and his unconventional methods. In 2018, GameSpot recognized Deadpool's influence beyond just humor, ranking him 29th in their "50 Most Important Superheroes" list for his impact on modern superhero storytelling and his ability to break the fourth wall. That same year, CBR ranked him 3rd in their "X-Force: 20 Powerful Members" list, highlighting his contributions to the team and his combat skills.

In 2019, ComicBook.com placed him 30th in their "50 Most Important Superheroes Ever" list, acknowledging his broader cultural impact, especially as a character who blurs the lines between hero and anti-hero. Finally, in 2023, CBR ranked Deadpool 8th in their "10 Most Popular Marvel Characters" list, recognizing his continued global popularity and his status as one of Marvel's most beloved and enduring characters.

=== Impact ===
In Superman/Batman Annual #1, an unnamed antimatter doppelganger of Deathstroke looks like Deadpool. DC Rebirth has given Harley Quinn a stalker/friend named Wayne Wilkins, a.k.a. "Red Tool", who is a direct parody of Deadpool.

== See also ==
- Deadpool in other media
- Wade Wilson (film character)
