= Pat Lee (comics) =

Canadian comic book artist and publisher

- Born: June 28, 1975 (age 51)
- Areas: Penciller, publisher
- Pseudonyms: The Transman, Michiyamenotehi Funana
- Notable works: Bloodpool; WildC.A.T.S. Wetworks (comics); Transformers

Patrick Lee (born June 28, 1975) is a Canadian comic book artist, publisher, former president, and co-founder of the now-defunct Dreamwave Productions.

== Biography ==
Lee began his career in the comic book industry by sending sample artworks to Marvel and DC editors after graduating high school at the age of 16, but they did not take any interest in his artwork. In 1994, he caught the attention of Image Comics co-founder Rob Liefeld at a convention in Toronto, Canada. Four months later, he was hired by Image Comics and went to train at Extreme Studios. There he practiced his speed, which greatly influenced his future works. In an interview with Wizard he stated, "When I was working there, I'd have work slapped down at me. It's gotta be done today. I'd hear, and I figured, okay, this is something I've gotta get used to."

Lee worked on various titles such as Bloodpool, Extreme Sacrifice, Black Flag, House of M: Iron Man, Glory, Darkchylde, Avengeblade, Extreme Prelude, and Prophet. Soon after, he was hired by Wildstorm Productions to work on Jim Lee's WildC.A.T.S., Allegra and Whilce Portacio's Wetworks. His career in comic books led him to work for Marvel Comics on a Wolverine/Punisher mini-series called Revelation.

Lee has also illustrated cards for the Magic: The Gathering collectible card game.

=== Dreamwave ===
A year later, he and his brother Roger Lee founded Dreamwave Productions. They began publishing their first mini-series Darkminds, followed by other titles like Transformers, Teenage Mutant Ninja Turtles, Warlands, Fate of the Blade, NecroWar, Sandscape and other graphic novels. Dreamwave filed for bankruptcy in January 2005 amidst a great deal of controversy, including rumors such as neglecting to pay several artists.

=== Work for hire ===
When Dreamwave Productions closed, Lee formed a new production company known as Dream Engine and parlayed his work on the Transformers franchise to land a string of jobs for Marvel and DC, most notably an X-Men/Fantastic Four mini-series and a single fill-in issue of the Superman/Batman series for DC. He also contributed to a relaunch of Cyberforce for Top Cow Productions, another Image studio. Most of the new projects with Dream Engine failed to bring Lee the high-profile acclaim of his Transformers work, with the Washington Times in particular criticizing his ability to draw humans versus the non-human robots from Transformers. Lee directed the music video for the song Electric by the band Blush. He was also a concept designer for CGI cartoon Train Hero (高铁侠) for Cartoon Animation.

== Controversy ==
Since the closure of Dreamwave, Pat Lee has been criticized for his business practices. In an interview with Newsarama, Transformers writers Adam Patyk and James McDonough stated they had been laid off before the Dreamwave bankruptcy following a controversy about their payment, and had subsequently filed a lawsuit against Dreamwave for lack of payment. In another interview, Transformers writer Simon Furman claimed that Lee, "looked [him] square in the eye and said everything’s hunky-dory" a mere month before the bankruptcy. Comic book journalist Rich Johnston repeatedly reported controversial details concerning Pat Lee, including the allegation that Dreamwave's assets and employees were shifted over to the new company Dream Engine, started by Pat Lee's brother Roger Lee in January 2005, before Dreamwave declared bankruptcy; the allegation that Lee had transferred ownership of a company-owned Porsche to himself prior to the Dreamwave bankruptcy; the allegation that Lee had bought an apartment for half a million Canadian dollars before the bankruptcy; a list of Dreamwave's debt and creditors; and the allegation that artist Alex Milne had been working as a ghost artist for Lee on Top Cow's Cyberforce title without being credited, with Lee eventually stopping payment to Milne when Top Cow had asked for confirmation that Lee was indeed the sole artist of the book and Milne refused to comply.

In December 2010, Pat Lee gave Johnston an interview, in which Johnston reiterated all of the above claims. While Lee admitted that "many artists had delays in payment" even before the bankruptcy and "regret[s] not being able to speak to everyone" beforehand, he also claimed that "most creators at Dreamwave were aware that we were going through financial difficulties. We didn’t announce it, but people were not being paid in full, and it was pretty obvious." He also claimed that "I barely paid myself at Dreamwave, and didn’t pay myself for extended periods so that the company could pay other bills." Regarding the Porsche, Lee claimed that it "was leased by Dreamwave and I was personally responsible for the vehicle at the end", whereas the apartment was a "small apartment in Toronto that I paid a mortgage on". Regarding Alex Milne's work as a ghost artist on Cyberforce, Lee claimed that he "forgot to adjust the credits at the end of the job", which was "definitely my error", and offered Milne to "provide me the appropriate documentation and evidence" that "Dream Engine owed him money." He also claimed that he didn't recall firing Alex, and that he "expressed to him via email in May 2007 that I understood he was paid in full".

Other allegations brought up by Johnston in the interview, namely that Top Cow had told him [Johnston] that Lee had specifically assured them that he was doing all the work on Cyberforce himself and that Marvel had told him [Johnston] that they were "asked to stop paying money to Dreamwave [for outsourced projects such as the X-Men/Fantastic Four limited series] but send it to Dream Engine instead", were not addressed by Lee. Lee did not respond to the specific request to offer evidence to counter the claim that he was trying to "siphon money from big gigs away from Dreamwave to Dream Engine in the months before the bankruptcy." However, Lee announced plans to set up a "Creative Refund Movement" with the specific intention to "raise funds to pay former Dreamwave artists who were financially affected by the bankruptcy." As of 2015, no Dreamwave employees have received any monetary compensation for their work at the company through the "Creative Refund Movement."
