= Four eyes =

Four eyes is an expression referring to a person who wears spectacles and may also refer to:

- Four Eyes, comic book
- Four Eyes!, television show
- Cryptoptila immersana, a moth with the common name four eyes or ivy leafroller
- "Aankhein Chaar" (lit. 'Four Eyes') or "Chori Chori Yun Jab Ho" (lit. 'When It Happens Secretly Like This'), a song by Bappi Lahiri and Kishore Kumar from the 1988 Indian film Paap Ki Duniya, remade for Tu Yaa Main (2026 film)

== See also ==
- Four (disambiguation)
- Eye (disambiguation)
