= I Kill Giants (disambiguation) =

I Kill Giants is an American comic book limited series published by Image Comics.

I Kill Giants may also refer to:

- I Kill Giants (film), a 2017 film
- "I Kill Giants" (song), by the Naked and Famous, 2013
