= Necroko =

Fictional superhero and magical girl

- Venomverse character
- First appearance: Extreme Venomverse #4 (July 2023)
- First game: Marvel Puzzle Quest
- Created by: Alyssa Wong and Ken Niimura

In-universe information
- Full name: Ellie Ellison
- Gender: Female
- Nationality: United States

Necroko (Ellie Ellison) is a fictional superhero and magical girl who appears in American comic books published by Marvel Comics.

The character received a generally positive critical reception.

== History of publication ==
Necroko was created by screenwriter Alyssa Wong and cartoonist Ken Niimura, making her first appearance in Extreme Venomverse #4, published in July 2023.

== Fictional Biography ==
Ellie Ellison was an ordinary student in love with her classmate, Parker Piper, who one day found a magical lasso attached to a symbiote, which gave her powers that she used to fight crime, adopting the identity of Necroko.

One day, when some monsters attacked the school, Ellie transformed into Necroko to defeat them and devour them through the symbiote, also saving Parker. After this, Piper was very grateful, becoming a big fan of Necroko without knowing that she was actually her classmate.

Some time later, Necroko was forced to fight alongside other symbiotes of Earth-616 against Carnage, after he began to travel through the multiverse killing alternate versions of Venom in search of absolute power. Necroko was presumed dead in battle, but Cullen Bunn, the author of the series, confirmed through social media that, in reality, she had survived.

== In other media ==
Necroko appeared as a playable character in the video game Marvel Puzzle Quest as part of a special event between the 7th and 9 April 2024, during which it was possible to acquire the character.

== Reception ==
Liam MgGuire, of Looper, praised the story written by Alyssa Wong and Ken Niimura for Ellie and Parker, qualifying Necroko as a character "with something special", and affirming that Marvel should tell more stories about the character.
