= I Kill Giants (film) =

2017 American fantasy film

- Theatrical release poster
- Directed by: Anders Walter
- Screenplay by: Joe Kelly
- Based on: I Kill Giants by: Joe Kelly; Ken Niimura
- Produced by: Chris Columbus; Michael Barnathan; Joe Kelly; Nick Spicer; Kyle Franke; Kim Magnusson; Adrian Politowski; Martin Metz
- Starring: Madison Wolfe; Imogen Poots; Sydney Wade; Rory Jackson; Zoe Saldaña
- Cinematography: Rasmus Heise
- Edited by: Lars Wissing
- Music by: Laurent Perez Del Mar
- Production companies: 1492 Pictures; Ocean Blue Entertainment; XYZ Films; uMedia; Man of Action Studios; Parallel Films; Adonais Productions
- Distributed by: RLJE Films (United States); Kaleidoscope Film Distribution (United Kingdom)
- Release dates: September 9, 2017 (Toronto); March 23, 2018 (United States)
- Running time: 106 minutes
- Countries: Belgium; China; United Kingdom; United States
- Language: English
- Box office: $342,558

I Kill Giants is a 2017 fantasy drama film directed by Anders Walter with a screenplay by Joe Kelly, based on Kelly and Ken Niimura's graphic novel of the same name. The film stars Madison Wolfe, Imogen Poots, Sydney Wade, Rory Jackson, Art Parkinson, Noel Clarke, Jennifer Ehle and Zoe Saldaña. I Kill Giants had its world premiere at the Toronto International Film Festival on September 9, 2017, and was released in the United States on March 23, 2018, by RLJE Films.

== Plot ==
Teen Barbara Thorson lives with her brother and supportive older sister Karen. She has created a fantasy world inspired by Dungeons & Dragons and the career of former Phillies pitcher Harry Coveleski. Believing that giants are coming to attack, Barbara crafts weapons and traps to fend them off. Her imagination helps her ignore real world traumas, including school bullies and her mother dying.

New student Sophia from Leeds, England wants to get to know her, but Barbara initially remains aloof. The school psychologist Mrs. Mollé interrupts a confrontation between Barbara and her bullies, and tries to reach her, but she doesn't want distractions from her fantastical routine.

After school, Barbara explains the giants' mythology to Sophia, showing her the baits and traps she sets, even presenting a magical "warhammer" inscribed as Coveleski which she carries. She tells Sophia about Harbingers, ghostly apparitions that warn her of approaching giants. After Barbara gets detention for insulting a teacher, she takes Sophia with her giant hunting while Sophia begins to doubt her.

When Mrs. Mollé mentions baseball, Barbara becomes lost in bad memories. In a daze, Barbara accidentally strikes Sophia. Although she apologizes, Sophia runs off, upset.

Sophia is later approached by bully leader Taylor, who convinces her to show them some of Barbara's "freaky things". She reluctantly leads her and her friends to the sanctuary, where they dismantle many of Barbara's traps. When Barbara arrives and proceeds to attack Taylor with Covelski, the weapon turns out to be a jawbone tied to a stick, so the furious Taylor and friends viciously beat her up.

A sympathetic Sophia takes Barbara to her home to recover. When she awakes, she becomes very upset at being brought upstairs and tells her to slowly move away before "it" sees her. After Sophia looks into one of the rooms she flees the house. Seeking help, the despondent Barbara visits Mollé but runs upon seeing her family.

Barbara goes truant for several days, so Sophia and Mollé visit her house. In the basement, Sophia discovers Barbara's recording of her and her mother's story of Coveleski's "Giant Killer" nickname. Sophia finds her, tries to convince her that giants don't exist, but Barbara can't hear about her mother's health. She angrily storms off and Harbingers taunt her, telling her she is too weak to defeat a giant.

At an abandoned train yard, Barbara faces a giant. She activates a train control station rigged to nearby electrical poles, setting fire to some of the cars. Sophia arrives just as Barbara is leaving. The next day, Barbara humiliates Taylor by placing a skeleton in her locker, in retaliation for her bullying. Worried, Mrs. Mollé and Karen proceed to look for Barbara. Desperate and in despair, she heads to her sanctuary to pray for the return of Coveleski.

As an unexpected storm hits the town, Mollé confronts Barbara on her way, telling her that her mother is desperate to see her but the disillusioned girl ignores her. Upon arriving, Barbara finds her sanctuary destroyed by the vengeful Taylor.

Suddenly, a titan emerges from the water. Barbara confronts it, drawing forth the restored Coveleski, a massive, glowing war hammer. She proceeds to defeat the giant to protect her mother. Lying injured upon the beach, the giant reveals that he came for Barbara, not her mother. Stunned, she demands that the titan "finish it".

The giant snatches Barbara, drawing her close so she can strike it down with Coveleski. As it falls into the ocean, it pulls her below the waves. A voice tells her that every living thing must die, that to run from death is to reject life, so she must find joy in every moment while she can. Barbara swims back to land, where she reunites with Sophia.

The next day, Barbara goes upstairs to see her mother, who is dying in bed. They share heartfelt messages and Barbara apologizes for avoiding her. After the summer, Barbara's mother dies, but she rekindles her relationships with Mollé, Karen and Sophia. On the night after the funeral, she is awoken by the titan, watching her from the ocean, before she goes back to sleep.

== Cast ==
- Madison Wolfe as Barbara Thorson
- Imogen Poots as Karen Thorson
- Sydney Wade as Sophia
- Rory Jackson as Taylor
- Art Parkinson as Dave
- Zoe Saldaña as Mrs. Mollé
- Noel Clarke as Mr. Mollé
- Jennifer Ehle as Mrs. Thorson
- Ciara O'Callaghan as Theresa Tuzzo
- John Boyle as Titan

== Production ==
On March 23, 2015, it was announced that Joe Kelly and Ken Niimura's graphic novel I Kill Giants was being adapted into a live-action feature film, for which Kelly would write the screenplay. Chris Columbus came on board to produce the film through his 1492 Pictures, along with Ocean Blue Entertainment, Man of Action Studios and XYZ Films. Treehouse would fully finance the film, while XYZ would handle the international sales. Anders Walter would make his feature film directing debut.

On September 11, 2015, Zoe Saldaña and Madison Wolfe joined the film, in which Wolfe would play Barbara, a young misfit girl battling both internal and external monsters in her life, while Saldaña would play Mrs. Mollé, a school psychologist. Wolfe was cast in the film after a search through 500 actors. On September 10, 2016, Imogen Poots was confirmed to star in the film.

Principal photography on the film began on September 27, 2016.

== Reception ==
On review aggregator website Rotten Tomatoes, the film holds an approval rating of 78% based on 60 reviews, and an average rating of 6.63/10. The website's critical consensus reads, "I Kill Giants' moody magical realism sometimes slips into the mundane, but impressive CGI and a powerhouse performance by Madison Wolfe pack an unexpected punch." On Metacritic, the film has a weighted average score of 74 out of 100, based on 10 critics, indicating "generally favorable" reviews.

== See also ==
- A Monster Calls
