= Before It Ends =

Before It Ends may refer to:

- A song on LP1 (Liam Payne album)
- Before It Ends, the 2022 film directed by Anders Walter
