= 9 Meter =

9 meter
- Film poster
- Directed by: Anders Walter
- Written by: Anders Walter
- Produced by: Tivi Magnusson
- Starring: Benjamin Gabrielsen, Oliver Methling Søndergaard, Thomas Baldus, Christine Albeck Børge
- Cinematography: Rasmus Heise
- Edited by: Lars Wissing
- Music by: Niels Christian Bærentzen, Rasmus Walter
- Release date: September 13, 2013 (Los Angeles)
- Running time: 16 minutes
- Country: Denmark
- Language: Danish

9 meter is a 2013 17-minute-long Danish live-action short film written and directed by Anders Walter. The film premiered at the Scandinavian Film Festival in Los Angeles on January 12, 2013. In 2012 the film was Oscar short-listed.

== Plot ==
16-year old Daniel is an athlete with a talent for long jumping. He has broken his own records many times. Unfortunately, his mother is in a coma and on the verge of dying. Daniel has the impression that as long as he breaks his own records, she stays alive. When he fails to do so, her condition coincidentally gets worse. Daniel blames himself and starts to jump between rooftops to get the extra kick needed to push himself to new limits and hopefully keep the doctors from shutting off her life support.
