= Writers on Comics Scriptwriting =

Book by Tom Root

Writers on Comics Scriptwriting, Vol. 1
- Author: Mark Salisbury
- Language: English
- Subject: Comics
- Publisher: Titan Books
- Publication date: 2002
- Publication place: United States
- Pages: 256
- ISBN: 1-84023-069-X
- OCLC: 41504747

Writers on Comics Scriptwriting, Vol. 2
- Author: Andrew Kardon and Tom Root
- Language: English
- Subject: Comics
- Publisher: Titan Books
- Publication date: 2004
- Publication place: United States
- Pages: 256
- ISBN: 1-84023-808-9

Writers on Comics Scriptwriting is book series published by Titan Books containing interviews from top comic book writers about their writing techniques and principal works. Volume 1 (ISBN 184023069X) was written by Mark Salisbury, and Volume 2 (ISBN 1840238089) was written by Andrew Kardon and Tom Root.

== Interviewees ==
=== Volume 1 ===
Volume 1 contains interviews with:

- Kurt Busiek
- Peter David
- Chuck Dixon
- Warren Ellis
- Garth Ennis
- Neil Gaiman
- Devin Grayson
- Dan Jurgens
- Joe Kelly
- Jeph Loeb
- Todd McFarlane
- Frank Miller
- Grant Morrison
- Mark Waid

=== Volume 2 ===
Volume 2 contains interviews with:

- Brian Azzarello
- Brian Michael Bendis
- Ed Brubaker
- Mike Carey
- Andy Diggle
- Paul Dini
- Peter Milligan
- Mark Millar
- Mike Mignola
- Geoff Johns
- Bruce Jones
- Greg Rucka
- Dave Sim
- Kevin Smith
- Jill Thompson
- Brian K. Vaughan
- Bill Willingham
