= Non-Stop Spider-Man =

- Cover of Non-Stop Spider-Man #1

Publication information
- Publisher: Marvel Comics
- Format: Limited series
- Genre: Superhero
- Publication date: March – September 2021
- No. of issues: 5

Creative team
- Written by: Joe Kelly
- Artist(s): Chris Bachalo
- Inker(s): Tim Townsend
- Colorist(s): Marcio Menyz
- Editor(s): Nick Lowe

Non-Stop Spider-Man is a five-issue superhero comic book series published by Marvel Comics that ran between March and September 2021. It was written by Joe Kelly, with artwork by Chris Bachalo, Tim Townsend and Marcio Menyz.

== Plot summary ==
Non-Stop Spider-Man follows Peter Parker as he comes across a mystery involving drug overdoses among several college students. He solicits help from Norah Winters. Together, they discover that a new drug called "A-Plus" that's targeting high performing, minority students who are otherwise considered unlikely to partake in narcotics. As they dig deeper into the mystery, they learn that the drug is designed to leech the victim's brain power away from them and channel them into the perpetrator. The perpetrators are later revealed to be the Zapata Brothers working for Helmut Zemo.

The series ends with Peter himself being injected with the drug. After a climactic battle with Zemo and his aide Wülf, he ends up on a jungle island. The drug reacts with his superhuman body, mutating him into a human-spider hybrid creature.

== Publication history ==
Marvel announced the series in February 2020, slated for a June 2020 release. However, it was delayed by the COVID-19 pandemic. Later in the year, Marvel announced that it would debut in January 2021. The ongoing pandemic resulted in further delays, causing the publication to deviate from its monthly schedule. Artist Chris Bachelo tested positive for COVID-19 during this time. In September 2021, the series was cancelled. Editor Nick Lowe thanked the creative team in the notes at the end of the final issue.

While the series seemingly ended on a cliffhanger, the storyline was picked up under a different title, Savage Spider-Man, in 2022. The new series was officially announced in October 2021. Writer Joe Kelly returned with a different art team.

== Collected editions ==
Title	Material collected	Release date	ISBN
Non-Stop Spider-Man: Big Brain Play	Non-Stop Spider-Man #1–5	January 5, 2022	978-1302927486
