= Spider-Man/Deadpool =

50-issue comic book series

- Cover of Spider-Man/Deadpool #1

Publication information
- Publisher: Marvel Comics
- Schedule: Monthly
- Format: Ongoing series
- Genre: Superhero
- Publication date: January 2016 – May 2019
- No. of issues: 50
- Main characters: Spider-Man; Deadpool; Patient Zero; Mephisto; Itsy Bitsy; Gwen Poole; The Manipulator

Creative team
- Created by: Spider-Man: Stan Lee; Steve Ditko; Deadpool: Rob Liefeld; Fabian Nicieza
- Written by: Joe Kelly; Scott Aukerman; Gerry Duggan; Penn Jillette; Paul Scheer; Nick Giovannetti; Elliot Kalan; Josh Corin; Robbie Thompson
- Artists: Ed McGuinness; Reilly Brown; Scott Koblish; Todd Nauck; Chris Bachalo
- Inker: Mark Morales
- Colorist: Jason Keith

Collected editions
- Isn't it Bromantic?: ISBN 0-7851-9786-9
- Side Pieces: ISBN 0-7851-9992-6
- Itsy Bitsy: ISBN 0-7851-9787-7
- Serious Business: ISBN 1-3029-0806-5
- Arms Race: ISBN 1-3029-1047-7
- WLMD: ISBN 1-3029-1048-5
- My Two Dads: ISBN 1-3029-1049-3
- Road Trip: ISBN 1-3029-1112-0
- Eventpool: ISBN 1-3029-1463-4

Spider-Man/Deadpool is a 50-issue comic book series published by Marvel Comics beginning in 2016. The title characters, Spider-Man and Deadpool, shared the focus of the book, the first series since 2007 to continue "One More Day" establishing Mephisto as part of the former's rogues' gallery.

The comic was originally launched by Joe Kelly and Ed McGuinness, but many authors and artists worked on the series during its run. Spider-Man/Deadpool is an action-comedy that explores the dynamic between the two characters and their personality differences. It is divided into the storylines Isn't it Bromantic?, Side Pieces, Itsy Bitsy, Serious Business, Arms Race, WLMD, My Two Dads, Road Trip, and Eventpool.

== Summary ==
The comic focuses on Deadpool and Spider-Man as they team up to face various threats. While Deadpool is immensely pleased as he finally gets to hang out with his favorite wall-crawler, Spider-Man is initially all too disgusted with Deadpool, having previously quit the Avengers Unity Squad because Deadpool became a member. As they team up and hang out together, Spidey learns about the man behind the wisecracking mercenary, while Deadpool starts holding himself to a higher moral standard in order to get closer to Spidey. It's not all bromance and sunshine, however, as Deadpool has been hired to kill Peter Parker.

Things only get more complicated from there, as several foes from both beyond the grave and the very living realm serve to give these two a hard time, testing the mettle their (often contrasting) morals are made of.

Ultimately, this series is an exploration of the two characters. "Drilling down on their friendship was our goal from the first issue. When we started, they were even more at odds due to the events of Secret Empire. That allowed us to have them wind up in situations where they were forced to find common ground," said Robbie Thompson on the subject of the character's relationship. "I think with Wade, he's an anti-hero, but there's a true blue hero somewhere deep down inside, under all the toilet humor and murder and lack of boundaries. And he views Spider-Man as the gold standard of being a good guy. He admires him. And who can blame him? For Spider-Man, one thing that I love about him is that he has the ability to see the potential good in anyone. Even when it costs him. So, he knows Wade is foolish and goes too far, but he also has seen Wade be heroic, as well as save Spider-Man from time to time. And yet, Wade can always snatch defeat from the claws of victory on his path to redemption."

== Main characters ==
- Spider-Man – a spider-powered superhero.
- Deadpool – an assassin with perpetual cancer.
- Patient Zero – the former best friend of Deadpool, who escapes Hell to kill him and Spider-Man.
- Mephisto – the demonic lord of Hell.
- Itsy Bitsy – a homeless blue six-armed spider-lady.
- Gwen Poole – the semi-omnipotent ruler of the Gutter, a girl from the real world transported to the Marvel Universe.
- The Manipulator – a writer who wrote himself into the Marvel Universe as a supervillain.

== Critical reception ==
Spider-Man/Deadpool received good reviews from critical outlets such as ComicBook.com, AIPT Comics, CBR, Comic Watch, and Bleeding Cool.

== Collected editions ==
#	Title	Material collected	Format	Pages	Released	ISBN
0	Don't Call It A Team-Up	Deadpool (1997) #11, Cable & Deadpool #24, Amazing Spider-Man (1963) #611, Deadpool (2008) #19–21, Avenging Spider-Man #12–13, Deadpool (2012) #10, Deadpool Annual #2	TPB	272	24 May 2016	978-1302900847
1	Isn't It Bromantic?	Spider-Man/Deadpool #1–5, #8	TPB	136	13 Sep 2016	978-0785197867
2	Side Pieces	Spider-Man/Deadpool #1.MU, #6–7, #11–12	TPB	120	20 Jun 2017	978-0785199922
3	Itsy Bitsy	Spider-Man/Deadpool #9–10, #13–14, #17–18	TPB	136	3 Oct 2017	978-0785197874
4	Serious Business	Spider-Man/Deadpool #19–22	TPB	112	16 Jan 2018	978-1302908065
5	Arms Race	Spider-Man/Deadpool #23–28	TPB	112	24 Apr 2018	978-1302910471
6	WLMD	Spider-Man/Deadpool #29–33	TPB	136	31 Jul 2018	978-1302910488
7	My Two Dads	Spider-Man/Deadpool #34–39	TPB	136	11 Dec 2018	978-1302910495
8	Roadtrip	Spider-Man/Deadpool #40–45	TPB	136	26 Mar 2019	978-1302911126
9	Eventpool	Spider-Man/Deadpool #46–50	TPB	112	23 Jul 2019	978-1302914639
	Spider-Man/Deadpool by Joe Kelly & Ed McGuinness	Spider-Man/Deadpool #1–5, #8–10, #13–14, #17–18	TPB	264	20 Mar 2018	978-1302903725
Modern Era Epic Collections
1	Isn't It Bromantic?	Spider-Man/Deadpool #1–14, #17–18, #1.MU	TPB	400	31 Oct 2023	978-1302951641
2	Til Death Do Us	Spider-Man/Deadpool #15–16, #19–32; Deadpool (2015) #28–29; Deadpool and the Mercs for Money #9–10	TPB	440	3 Sep 2024	978-1302959838
Paperback Omnibuses, produced by Panini UK, for the EU market
1	Spider-Man/Deadpool Omnibus	Spider-Man/Deadpool #1–18	TPB Omnibus	396	1 Jun 2022	978-1804910313
2	Spider-Man/Deadpool Omnibus	Spider-Man/Deadpool #19–33	TPB Omnibus	356	1 Jun 2023	978-1804910313
