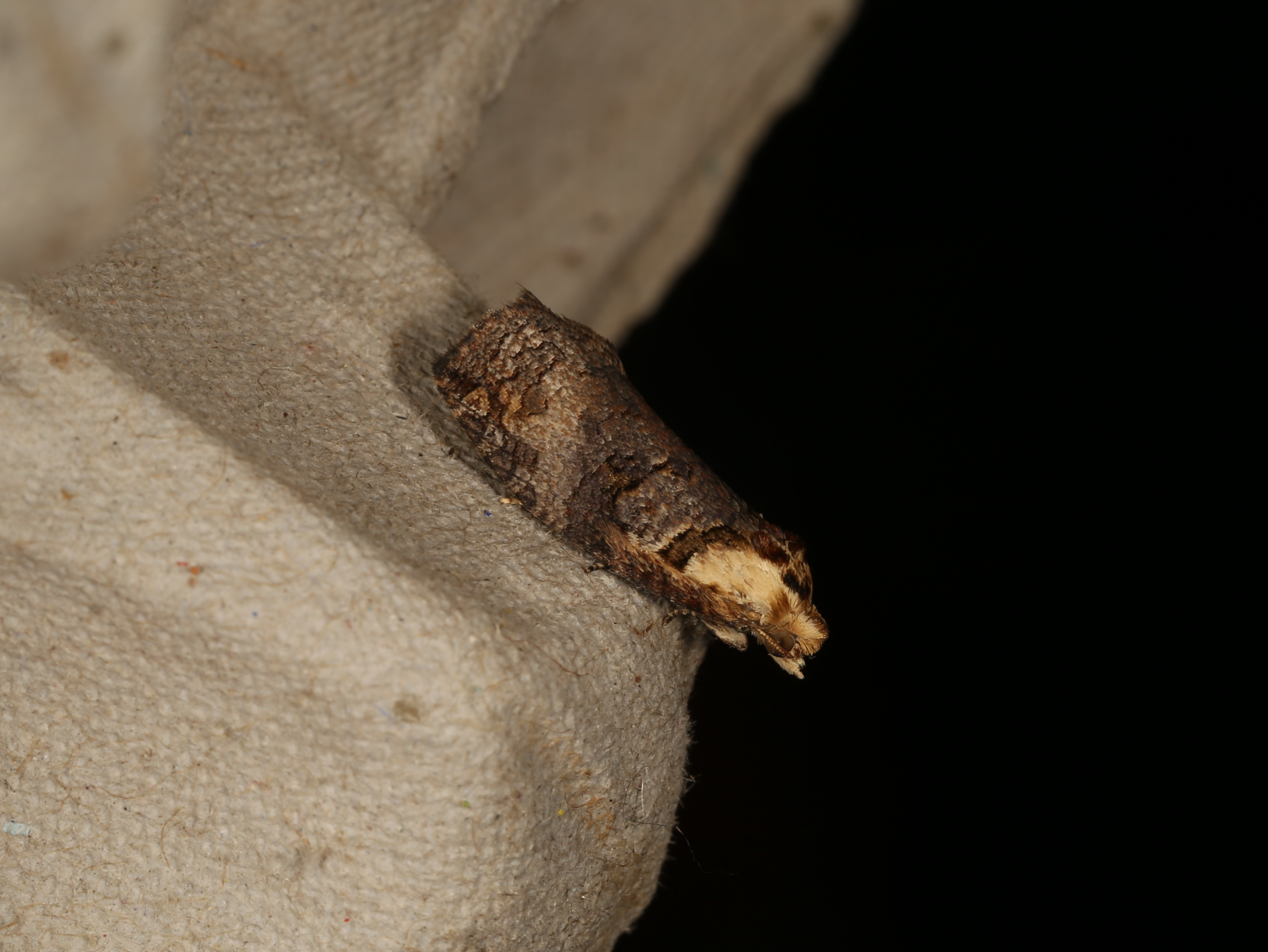

Scientific classification
- Domain: Eukaryota
- Kingdom: Animalia
- Phylum: Arthropoda
- Class: Insecta
- Order: Lepidoptera
- Family: Tortricidae
- Genus: Cryptoptila
- Species: C. crypsilopha

Binomial name
- Cryptoptila crypsilopha (Turner, 1925)

Synonyms
- Tortrix crypsilopha Turner, 1925

= Cryptoptila crypsilopha =

Species of moth

Cryptoptila crypsilopha is a species of moth of the family Tortricidae. It is found in Australia, where it has been recorded from Queensland.

The wingspan is about 30 mm. The forewings are grey, with a suffused, ferruginous, subcostal streak and a similar, median, longitudinal streak, as well as a few darker strigulae (fine streaks) in the terminal area. The hindwings are grey with a subapical costal tuft of scales.
