= Cryptoptila australana =

Scientific classification
- Kingdom: Animalia
- Phylum: Arthropoda
- Clade: Pancrustacea
- Class: Insecta
- Order: Lepidoptera
- Family: Tortricidae
- Genus: Cryptoptila
- Species: C. australana

Binomial name
- Cryptoptila australana (Lewin, 1805)

Synonyms
- Tortrix australana Lewin, 1805

Species of moth

Cryptoptila australana, commonly known as the elderberry leaf roller, is a species of moth of the family Tortricidae. It is found in Australia, where it has been recorded from Queensland, New South Wales, the Australian Capital Territory, Victoria, and South Australia.

The wingspan is about 30 mm. The larvae feed on Polyscias sambucifolia (elderberry panax) and Telopea speciosissima (waratah).
