= Joe Kelly (comics writer) =

American writer, penciler, and editor

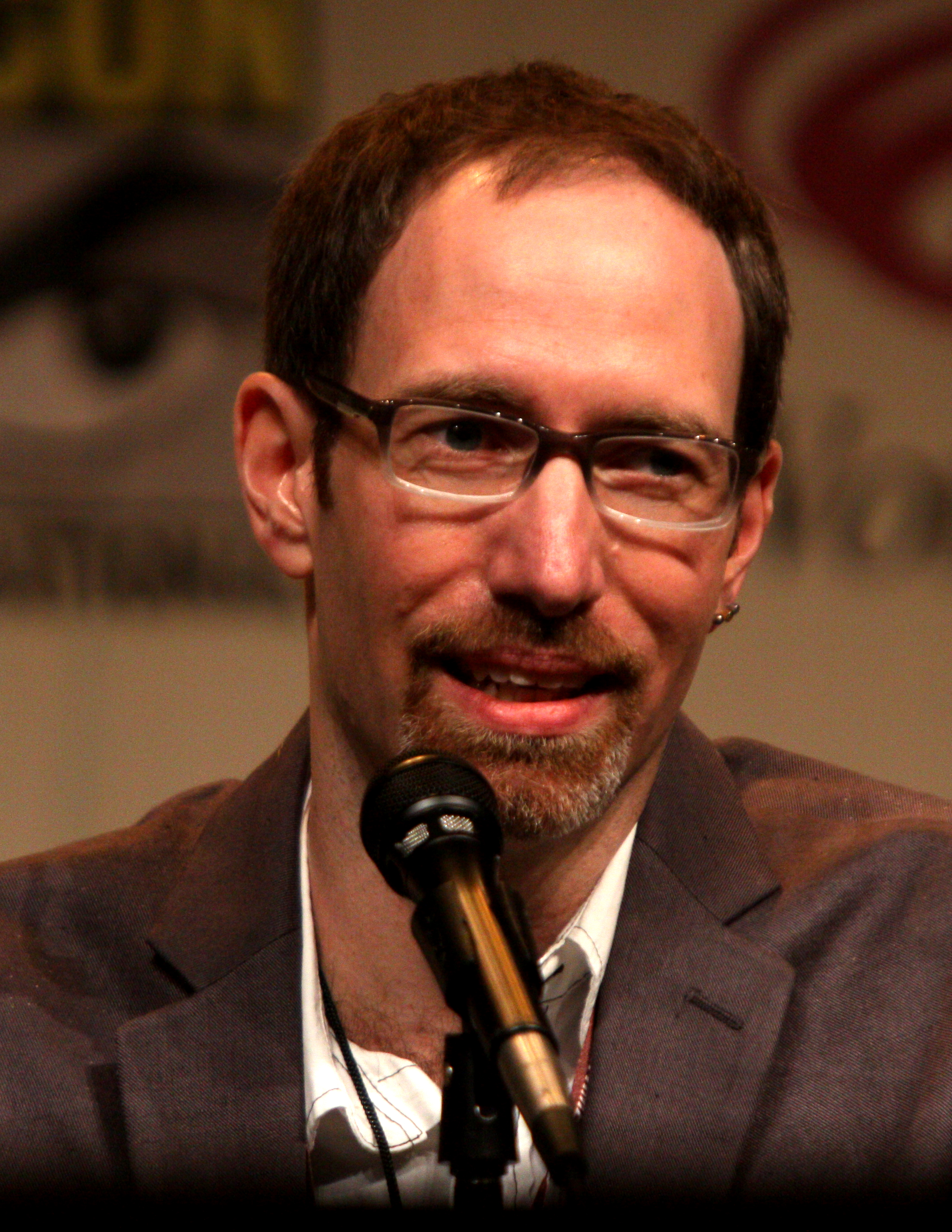
- Kelly at the 2012 Wondercon
- Born: Joseph Kelly; 1971 (age 54–55)
- Area: Writer
- Notable works: Deadpool; Uncanny X-Men; Action Comics; JLA; I Kill Giants; Spider-Man/Deadpool

Joseph Kelly (born September 1, 1971) is an American comic book writer, penciler and editor who has written such titles as 2099: World of Tomorrow, Deadpool, Uncanny X-Men, Action Comics, and JLA, as well as award-winning work on The Amazing Spider-Man and Superman. As part of the comics creator group Man of Action Studios, Kelly is one of the creators of the animated series Ben 10.

== Career ==
Kelly attended Freeport High School and went on to receive his MFA at New York University's Tisch School of the Arts, where he still teaches Writing for Animation/Writing for Comics. At NYU, he was recruited into Marvel Comics' editor James Felder's Stan-hattan Project, a program that trained potential comic book writers at the university. After six months of working in the class, Felder offered Kelly a job scripting Fantastic Four 2099 over a Karl Kesel plot. Kelly took the assignment, but his first published work for Marvel was 1996's 2099: World of Tomorrow #1–8 and Marvel Fanfare vol.2 #2–3.

In 1997, Kelly began his first monthly assignment, Deadpool, initially pencilled by Ed McGuinness. The title was immediately well received by fans and critics. At one point it was due to be canceled with #25, but a write-in and Internet campaign by fans led Marvel to reverse their decision. Kelly left the title with #33 in 1999. In 1997, Kelly also became the writer of Daredevil, on which he was accompanied by well-known Daredevil artist Gene Colan.

At around the same time he produced a Daredevil/Deadpool '97 Annual with artist Bernard Chang which pitted the two characters against each other and was generally well received. Kelly left Daredevil with #375 in 1998.

Kelly's next major Marvel assignment was in late 1997, at the company's then bestselling title, X-Men, where he worked with penciller Carlos Pacheco. However, Kelly's stint on the title, and his friend Steven T. Seagle's run on sister title Uncanny X-Men, was cut short when the creators quit, blaming constant editorial interference. Kelly's last issue was #85 in 1999.

Kelly then began to work for Marvel's competitor DC Comics, specifically their Action Comics title starring Superman with #760 in October 1999. He stayed on the title for almost five years (up until #813, May 2004), working mainly with penciller Pasqual Ferry.

During this run he authored "What's So Funny About Truth, Justice & the American Way?" in Action Comics #775, which introduced The Elite (an Authority-like team of anti-heroes) and their leader Manchester Black. That issue was called "the single best issue of a comic book written in the year 2001" by Wizard Magazine.

In December 2000, Kelly had a short stint as writer on the Superboy comic (#83–93), again mostly working with his Action Comics collaborator Ferry.

In 2002 he began a long run on DC's JLA (#61–93) comic book with penciller Doug Mahnke. After their run on that title finished the same creative team launched a twelve-issue limited series Justice League Elite featuring some of the characters from Action Comics #775.

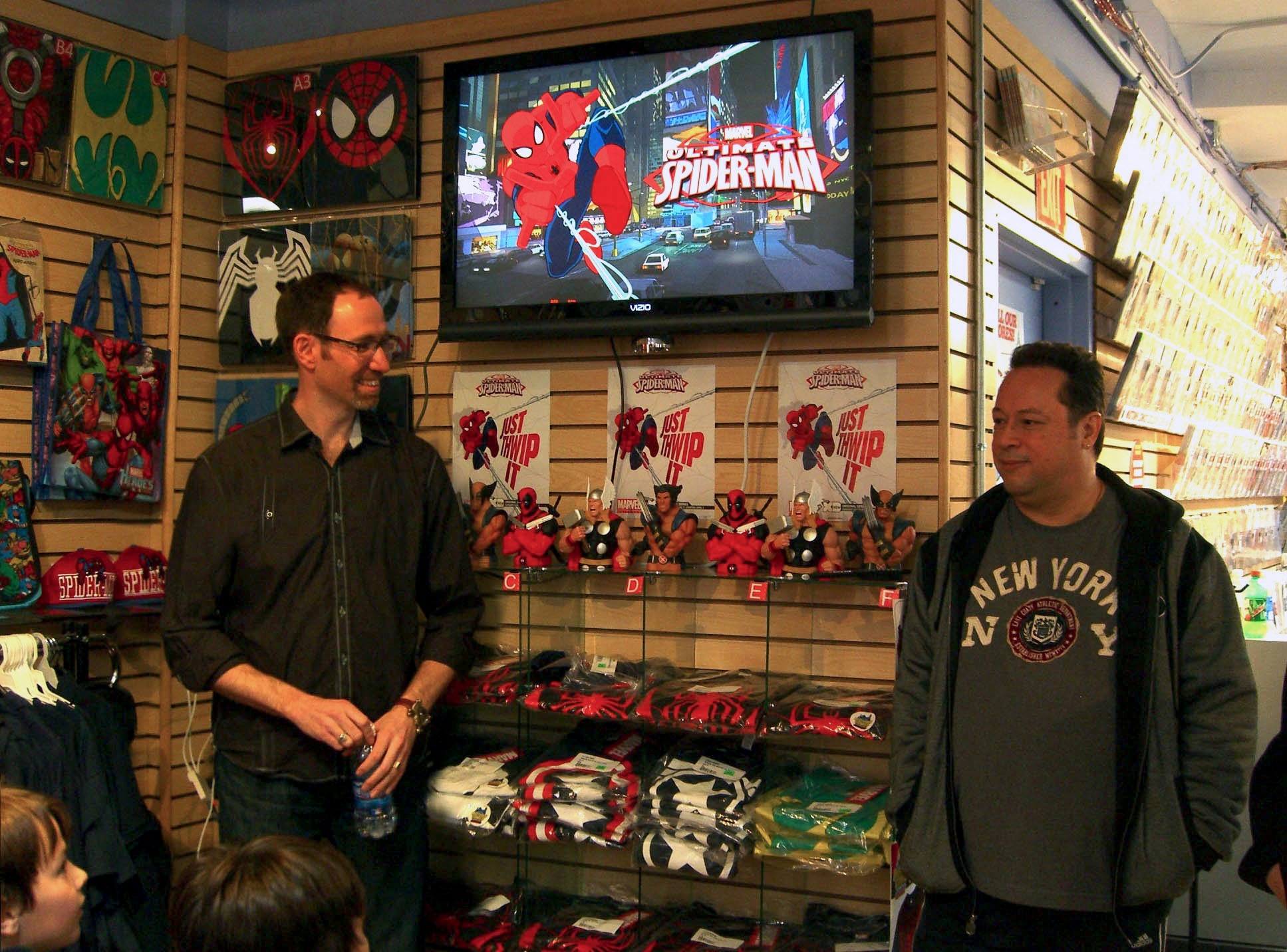
Kelly and Marvel Chief Creative Officer Joe Quesada prepare a March 31, 2012 sneak preview of Ultimate Spider-Man for fans at Midtown Comics in Manhattan, the day before the series' broadcast TV debut.

Also in 2002, DC published Green Lantern: Legacy – The Last Will & Testament of Hal Jordan, a hardcover graphic novel by Kelly and artists Brent Anderson and Bill Sienkiewicz, which looked back at the life and career of Hal Jordan, who at that point was the Spectre. Early in his career, Kelly had described working with Sienkiewicz as his dream collaboration. An interview with Kelly also appeared in the first volume of Writers on Comic Scriptwriting from Titan Books.

Kelly has produced three creator-owned works: Steampunk, pencilled by Chris Bachalo and published by DC through Wildstorm's Cliffhanger imprint in 2000 (a second part, Drama Obscura, brought closure to the story, but Kelly has said he intends to eventually continue the book); M. Rex with penciller Duncan Rouleau, which was published by the now-defunct Avalon Studios (it was canceled after two issues); and Ballast, with penciller Ilya, a one-shot published by Active Images.

In 2004 he collaborated with artist Ariel Olivetti on a Space Ghost series, published by DC, which depicted the character with a serious space opera tone and, for the first time, revealed his origins. Next up is a similar mini-series, this time starring Jonny Quest.

Kelly is a part of the Man of Action collective of creators (along with Joe Casey, Duncan Rouleau, Steven T. Seagle), who created the franchise Ben 10. Around the same time Ben 10 began to air, he was also hired as a story editor on TMNT: Fast Forward. With Man of Action Studios, Kelly was a supervising producer on Disney/Marvel's Disney XD series, Ultimate Spider-Man.

Kelly has written DC's Supergirl and Marvel's Amazing Spider-Man. He has published creator-owned work through Image Comics, including Four Eyes and I Kill Giants, as well as a graphic novel Douglas Fredericks and the House of They.

Kelly wrote the Fantastic Four: World's Greatest Heroes episode "My Neighbour Was a Skrull" featuring the Skrulls, as well as the series premiere of Chaotic, a new animated series based on the trading card game. He also co-wrote Darksiders, a video game for THQ.

In 2007, he shot a short film, Brother's Day, which was a selection in the Brooklyn International Film Festival.

== Bibliography ==
=== Marvel Comics ===
- Marvel 2099:
  - Fantastic Four #5: "Strange Tidings" (script by Kelly from a plot by Karl Kesel, art by Matt Ryan, 1996)
  - World of Tomorrow #1–8 (co-written by Kelly and Ben Raab, art by Pasqual Ferry, Jason Armstrong, David Brewer, Karl Moline (#3–4) and Yancey Labat (#4), 1996–1997)
- Daredevil:
  - Over the Edge #10: "The Politics of Infamy" (with Stephen B. Jones, anthology, Marvel Edge, 1996)
  - Daredevil (with Pasqual Ferry (#358), Cary Nord (#365 and 375), Gene Colan, Ariel Olivetti and Richie Acosta (#373), 1996–1998) collected as:
    - Purgatory and Paradise (includes #358, tpb, 504 pages, 2019, ISBN 1-302-91879-6)
    - Widow's Kiss (collects #365–375, -1 and Daredevil/Deadpool Annual '97, tpb, 504 pages, 2015, ISBN 0-7851-9297-2)
      - Ben Raab is credited for "plot assist" in #373 and Chris Claremont is credited for "story assist" in #375.
      - Issue #374 is co-written by Kelly and Jonathan Barron from a plot by Kelly.
- Marvel Fanfare vol. 2 #2–3: "Instinct" (with Pop Mhan, anthology, 1996)
- What If...? vol. 2 (anthology):
  - "The Man, The Monster" (with Nelson DeCastro, in #91, 1996)
  - "...I'll Be Your Best Friend!" (with James Daly, in #92, 1996)
- X-Men:
  - Wolverine Annual '96: "The Golden Temple" (with Tommy Lee Edwards, co-feature, 1996)
  - Juggernaut: "A Night in Spite" (with Duncan Rouleau, one-shot, 1997)
  - Deadpool (with Ed McGuinness, Aaron Lopresti (#-1), Shannon Denton, Pete Woods, Walter A. McDaniel, Anthony Williams (#22), Yancey Labat (#0) and David Brewer (#33), 1997–1999) collected as:
    - James Felder is credited for "plot assist" on issues #20 and 26.
      - Deadpool Classic Volume 1 (includes #1, tpb, 264 pages, 2008, ISBN 0-7851-3124-8)
      - Deadpool Classic Volume 2 (collects #2–8, -1 and Daredevil/Deadpool Annual '97, tpb, 256 pages, 2009, ISBN 0-7851-3731-9)
      - Deadpool Classic Volume 3 (collects #9–17, tpb, 280 pages, 2009, ISBN 0-7851-4244-4)
      - Deadpool Classic Volume 4 (collects #0, 18–25 and Deadpool/Death Annual '98, tpb, 296 pages, 2011, ISBN 0-7851-5302-0)
      - Deadpool Classic Volume 5 (collects #26–33 and the Baby's First Deadpool Book one-shot, tpb, 272 pages, 2011, ISBN 0-7851-5519-8)
      - Deadpool by Joe Kelly Omnibus (collects #0–33, -1, Annual '97 and '98, Baby's First Deadpool Book and the short story from Deadpool vol. 2 #900, hc, 1,160 pages, 2014, ISBN 0-7851-8559-3)
  - X-Men vol. 2 (with Carlos Pacheco, Germán García, Mat Broome (#76), Brandon Peterson (#80), Adam Kubert and Alan Davis (#85); issue #73 is co-written by Kelly and Joe Casey, 1997–1999) collected as:
    - X-Men Gold: Homecoming (collects #70–79, tpb, 336 pages, 2018, ISBN 1-302-90954-1)
    - X-Men: The Hunt for Professor X (includes #80–84, tpb, 368 pages, 2015, ISBN 0-7851-9720-6)
    - X-Men: The Magneto War (includes #85, tpb, 504 pages, 2018, ISBN 1-302-91376-X)
  - Uncanny X-Men #359: "Power Play" (co-written by Kelly and Steven T. Seagle, art by Chris Bachalo and Ryan Benjamin, 1998) collected in X-Men Blue: Reunion (tpb, 328 pages, 2018, ISBN 1-302-90953-3)
  - Deadpool vol. 2 #900: "Pinky Swear" (with Rob Liefeld, co-feature, 2009) collected in Deadpool: Dead Head Redemption (tpb, 240 pages, 2011, ISBN 0-7851-5649-6)
  - Deadpool vol. 3 #27: "The Niagara Bride" (with Paco Medina, co-feature, 2014) collected in Deadpool: The Wedding (tpb, 168 pages, 2014, ISBN 0-7851-8933-5)
  - Deadpool: The End (with Mike Hawthorne, one-shot, 2020) collected in Marvel: The End (tpb, 200 pages, 2020, ISBN 1-302-92499-0)
  - Deadpool: Nerdy 30: "The Immaculate Misconception" (with Gerardo Sandoval, anthology one-shot, 2021)
  - Deadpool & Wolverine: WWIII (with Adam Kubert, mini-series, 2024)
- Spider-Man:
  - Webspinners: Tales of Spider-Man #7–9: "The Bridge" (with Bart Sears and Andy Smith, 1999) collected in Spider-Man: Webspinners — The Complete Collection (tpb, 480 pages, 2018, ISBN 1-302-90681-X)
  - The Amazing Spider-Man:
    - Crime and Punisher (hc, 136 pages, 2009, ISBN 0-7851-3393-3; tpb, 2009, ISBN 0-7851-3417-4) includes:
      - The Amazing Spider-Man: Extra! #1: "Death of a Wise Guy" (with Chris Bachalo, anthology, 2008)
      - "Hammerhead: Family Ties" (with Chris Bachalo, in #575–576, 2008–2009)
      - "J. Jonah Jameson! I Name Thee Murderer!" (with Barry Kitson, co-feature in #577, 2009)
    - American Son (hc, 136 pages, 2009, ISBN 0-7851-3870-6; tpb, 2010, ISBN 0-7851-4083-2) collects:
      - The Amazing Spider-Man: Extra! #3: "Nice Things" (with Dale Eaglesham, anthology, 2009)
      - "American Son" (with Phil Jimenez, Paulo Siqueira and Marco Checchetto, in #595–599, 2009)
    - Died in Your Arms Tonight (hc, 192 pages, 2009, ISBN 0-7851-4459-5; tpb, 2010, ISBN 0-7851-4485-4) includes:
      - "Violent Visions" (with Max Fiumara, co-feature in #600, 2009)
    - Return of the Black Cat (hc, 168 pages, 2010, ISBN 0-7851-4249-5; tpb, 2010, ISBN 0-7851-3868-4) includes:
      - "The Long-Term Arrangement" (with Mike McKone and Adriana Melo, in #606–607, 2009)
      - "This Man, This [Expletive Deleted]" (with Eric Canete, in #611, 2010)
    - The Gauntlet Volume 1 (hc, 176 pages, 2010, ISBN 0-7851-4264-9; tpb, 2010, ISBN 0-7851-3871-4) includes:
      - "The Other Woman" (with J. M. Ken Niimura, co-feature in #612, 2010)
    - The Gauntlet Volume 2 (hc, 160 pages, 2010, ISBN 0-7851-4265-7; tpb, 2010, ISBN 0-7851-3872-2) includes:
      - "Rage of the Rhino" (with Max Fiumara) and "The Walk" (with Javier Pulido, in #617, 2010)
    - The Gauntlet Volume 3 (hc, 136 pages, 2010, ISBN 0-7851-4611-3; tpb, 2010, ISBN 0-7851-4612-1) includes:
      - "Rhino: Endangered Species" (with Max Fiumara, in #625, 2010)
    - Grim Hunt (hc, 192 pages, 2010, ISBN 0-7851-4617-2; tpb, 2011, ISBN 0-7851-4618-0) collects:
      - Spider-Man: Grim Hunt — The Kraven Saga (with Michael Lark, one-shot, 2010)
      - "Grim Hunt" (with Michael Lark, Marco Checchetto and Matthew Southworth, in #634–637, 2010)
    - Origin of the Species (hc, 232 pages, 2011, ISBN 0-7851-4621-0; tpb, 2011, ISBN 0-7851-4622-9) includes:
      - "Norah's Last Night in NYC" (with J. M. Ken Niimura, co-feature in #647, 2010)
  - Spider-Man/Deadpool #1–5, 8–10, 13–14 and 17–18 (with Ed McGuinness, 2016–2017) collected as Spider-Man/Deadpool by Joe Kelly and Ed McGuinness (hc, 264 pages, 2018, ISBN 1-302-90372-1)
  - Non-Stop Spider-Man #1–5 (with Chris Bachalo, Dale Eaglesham (#1) and Gerardo Sandoval + Cory Smith (#5), 2021) collected as Non-Stop Spider-Man: Big Brain Play (tpb, 128 pages, 2022, ISBN 1-302-92748-5)
- Heroes Reborn: The Return (tpb, 288 pages, 2009, ISBN 0-7851-3748-3) includes:
  - Heroes Reborn: Rebel: "Wild Blue" (with Mark Bagley and Matt Haley, one-shot, 2000)
  - Heroes Reborn: Remnants: "The Day the Earth Got Ill!" (with Ethan van Sciver, one-shot, 2000)

=== DC Comics ===
- All-Star Comics 80-Page Giant: "P.O.V.: A Fable" (with Duncan Rouleau, anthology one-shot, 1999)
- Superman:
  - Secret Origins of Super-Villains 80-Page Giant: "Dreams in Smoke" (with Butch Guice, anthology one-shot, 1999)
  - Action Comics:
    - Superman: The City of Tomorrow Volume 1 (tpb, 466 pages, 2019, ISBN 1-4012-9508-8) includes:
      - "...Never-Ending Battle..." (with Germán García and Kano (#762), in #760–762, 1999–2000)
      - Superman Y2K: "The End" (with Butch Guice, one-shot, 2000)
      - "Y2K, Part Five: Sacrifice for Tomorrow" (with Germán García and Kano, in #763, 2000)
    - Metropolis Secret Files: "Metropolica" (with Pasqual Ferry, co-feature in one-shot, 2000)
    - Superman: The City of Tomorrow Volume 2 (tpb, 504 pages, 2020, ISBN 1-77950-312-1) includes:
      - "Quiet After the Storm" (with Kano, in #764–765, 2000)
      - "The Search for Lois: D.O.A." (with Cary Nord, in #766, 2000)
      - "Critical Condition, Part Four: Death's Door" (with Kano, in #767, 2000)
      - "O, Captain, My Captain!" (with Duncan Rouleau, in #768, 2000)
    - Superman: Emperor Joker (tpb, 256 pages, 2007, ISBN 1-4012-1193-3) includes:
      - "Arkham, Part Two: Supermanamrepus" (with Kano, in #769, 2000)
      - Superman: Emperor Joker (co-written by Kelly and Jeph Loeb, art by various artists, one-shot, 2000)
      - "Emperor Joker, Part Four: He Who Laughs Last!" (with Kano, in #770, 2000)
    - Superman: President Lex (tpb, 240 pages, 2003, ISBN 1-56389-974-4) includes:
      - "Kith & Kin" (with Kano, in #772–773, 2000–2001)
    - "Fireside Chat" (with Eric Canete, in #774, 2001)
    - Superman: The Greatest Stories Ever Told Volume 1 (tpb, 192 pages, 2004, ISBN 1-4012-0339-6) includes:
      - "What's So Funny About Truth, Justice & the American Way?" (with Doug Mahnke and Lee Bermejo, in #775, 2001)
    - Superman: Return to Krypton (tpb, 208 pages, 2004, ISBN 1-4012-0194-6) includes:
      - "Return to Krypton, Part Four: Escape from Krypton" (with Kano, in #776, 2001)
      - "Return to Krypton II, Part Four: Dream's End" (with Pasqual Ferry, in #793, 2002)
    - "Kancer" (with Kano, in #777, 2001)
    - "King Takes Pawn" (with Duncan Rouleau, in #779, 2001)
    - Superman: Our Worlds at War (tpb, 512 pages, 2006, ISBN 1-4012-1129-1) includes:
      - "Our Worlds at War" (with Kano, in #780–782, 2001)
      - Superboy vol. 3 #91: "War Letters" (with Pasqual Ferry, 2001)
    - Our Worlds at War: Secret Files: "They Call Me Zed" (with Alberto Saichann, co-feature in one-shot, 2001)
    - "The Gift" (with Brandon Badeaux, in #783, 2001)
    - "Joker: Last Laugh — Whose Mind is It Anyways?" (with Duncan Rouleau, in #784, 2001)
    - "Demento" (with Duncan Rouleau, in #785, 2002)
    - "Red" (with Pasqual Ferry, in #786, 2002)
    - "Jikei Ketsuki: Mercy, Love and Blood" (with Pasqual Ferry, in #787–788, 2002)
    - "Man and Beast" (with Duncan Rouleau, in #789–790, 2002)
    - "Big City, Little Man" (with Pasqual Ferry, in #792, 2002)
    - Superman: Ending Battle (tpb, 192 pages, 2009, ISBN 1-4012-2259-5) includes:
      - "Ending Battle" (with Duncan Rouleau, in #795–796, 2002)
    - "Superego" (with Renato Arlem, in #797, 2003)
    - "Lost Hearts, Part Four: Heartsong" (with Pasqual Ferry, in #798, 2003)
    - "The Cage" (with Carlos Meglia, in #799, 2003)
    - "A Hero's Journey" (with Pasqual Ferry, Duncan Rouleau and various artists, in #800, 2003)
    - "The Harvest" (with Tom Raney (#801), Tom Derenick (#802) and Pasqual Ferry, in #801–805, 2003)
    - "Hungry Ghost" (with Pasqual Ferry, in #806–808, 2003)
    - "The Creeping Death" (with Pasqual Ferry, in #809, 2004)
    - Superman: The Man of Steel — Believe (digest-sized tpb, 128 pages, 2013, ISBN 1-4012-4705-9) includes:
      - "Walking Midnight" (with Pasqual Ferry, Kano, Duncan Rouleau, Dave Bullock and Renato Guedes, in #810, 2004)
  - Superboy vol. 3 #83–93 (with Pasqual Ferry, Paco Medina (#86–87) and Carlo Barberi (#89); issues #87–90 and 92–93 are co-written by Kelly and Eddie Berganza, 2001)
  - Adventures of Superman:
    - "Superman: The Dailies 2002 — The Most Bizarro Case of All — Part 8 of 8" (with Carlos Meglia, co-feature in #600, 2002)
    - "Lost Hearts, Part Two: Heartbroken" (with Dwayne Turner, in #611, 2003)
  - Superman: Godfall (hc, 112 pages, 2004, ISBN 1-4012-0376-0; tpb, 2004, ISBN 1-4012-0236-5) collects:
    - "Godfall, Parts 1 and 4" (co-written by Kelly and Michael Turner, art by Talent Caldwell, in Action Comics #812–813, 2004)
    - "Godfall, Parts 2 and 5" (co-written by Kelly and Michael Turner, art by Talent Caldwell, in Adventures of Superman #625–626, 2004)
    - "Godfall, Parts 3 and 6" (co-written by Kelly and Michael Turner, art by Talent Caldwell, in Superman vol. 2 #202–203, 2004)
  - Superman: Infinite Crisis (tpb, 128 pages, 2006, ISBN 1-4012-0953-X) collects:
    - "This is Your Life, Part 1" (with Ed Benes, Jerry Ordway, Howard Chaykin and Renato Guedes, in Superman vol. 2 #226, 2006)
    - "This is Your Life, Part 2" (with Ed Benes, Dan Jurgens, Ian Churchill, Phil Jimenez, Tom Derenick, Renato Guedes, Lee Bermejo and Doug Mahnke, in Action Comics #836, 2006)
    - "This is Your Life, Part 3" (with Ed Benes, Tom Derenick, Karl Kerschl, Duncan Rouleau, Dale Eaglesham and Ed McGuinness, in Adventures of Superman #649, 2006)
  - Supergirl vol. 4 (with Ian Churchill, Ron Adrian (#8), Joe Benitez (#11), Alé Garza and Adam Archer (#18), 2006–2007) collected as:
    - Issue #7 is scripted by Kelly from a story by Greg Rucka; issue #16 is scripted by Kelly from a story by Mark Sable.
      - The Girl of Steel (includes #7–10, tpb, 304 pages, 2016, ISBN 1-4012-6093-4)
      - Breaking the Chain (collects #11 and 13–19, tpb, 272 pages, 2016, ISBN 1-4012-6467-0)
        - Includes the "All I Want for Christmas..." short story (art by Alé Garza) from DCU Infinite Holiday Special (one-shot, 2007)
  - Superman/Batman:
    - Volume 3 (tpb, 296 pages, 2016, ISBN 1-4012-6480-8) includes:
      - Annual #1: "Stop Me If You've Heard This One..." (with Ed McGuinness, Ryan Ottley, Sean Gordon Murphy and Carlo Barberi, 2006)
    - Volume 4 (tpb, 352 pages, 2016, ISBN 1-4012-6385-2) includes:
      - Annual #2: "The Unexamined Life..." (with Scott Kolins, 2008)
    - Sorcerer Kings (hc, 160 pages, 2011, ISBN 1-4012-3266-3; tpb, 2012, ISBN 1-4012-3446-1) includes:
      - "Who Would Win?" (co-written by Kelly and his son Jack, art by Ed Benes, in #78, 2011)
- Steampunk (with Chris Bachalo, Cliffhanger, 2000–2002) collected as:
  - Manimatron (collects #1–5 and the Steampunk: Catechism prelude one-shot, tpb, 160 pages, 2001, ISBN 1-56389-762-8)
  - Drama Obscura (collects #6–12, tpb, 176 pages, 2003, ISBN 1-4012-0047-8)
- Wonder Woman vol. 2 #170: "She's a Wonder" (with Phil Jimenez, 2001) collected in Wonder Woman: The Greatest Stories Ever Told Volume 1 (tpb, 192 pages, 2007, ISBN 1-4012-1216-6)
- Batman: Gotham Knights #17: "A Moment in the Light" (with Aaron Wiesenfeld, co-feature, 2001) collected in Batman: Black and White Volume 3 (hc, 288 pages, 2007, ISBN 1-4012-1531-9; tpb, 2008, ISBN 1-4012-1354-5)
- Green Lantern: Legacy — The Last Will and Testament of Hal Jordan (with Brent Anderson, graphic novel, hc, 106 pages, 2002, ISBN 1-56389-864-0; sc, 2004, ISBN 1-4012-0365-5)
- 9-11 Volume 2: "Wake Up" (with Scott Kolins, anthology graphic novel, 224 pages, 2002, ISBN 1-56389-878-0)
- Justice League of America:
  - JLA (with Doug Mahnke, Yvel Guichet, Lewis LaRosa (#76), Duncan Rouleau (#80–82) and ChrisCross (#83 and 90), 2002–2004) collected as:
    - The Deluxe Edition Volume 6 (collects #61–76, tpb, 432 pages, 2015, ISBN 1-4012-5136-6)
    - The Deluxe Edition Volume 7 (collects #78–90, tpb, 416 pages, 2015, ISBN 1-4012-5528-0)
  - Justice League Elite (with Doug Mahnke, 2004–2005) collected as:
    - Volume 1 (collects #1–4 and Action Comics #775, tpb, 208 pages, 2005, ISBN 1-4012-0481-3) collects:
      - Includes JLA #100 that set up then-upcoming Justice League Elite spin-off series (written by Kelly, art by Doug Mahnke, 2004)
      - Includes the "Same Coin" short story (art by Doug Mahnke) from JLA Secret Files & Origins 2004 (one-shot, 2004)
    - Volume 2 (collects #5–12, tpb, 192 pages, 2007, ISBN 1-4012-1556-4)
  - JLA/Cyberforce (with Doug Mahnke, one-shot, co-published by DC and Top Cow, 2005)
- Enginehead #1–6 (of 8 — canceled before completion) (with Ted McKeever, 2004)
- Space Ghost #1–6 (with Ariel Olivetti, 2005) collected as Space Ghost (tpb, 144 pages, 2005, ISBN 1-4012-0721-9)
- Solo #6: "Drive" (with Jordi Bernet, anthology, 2005) collected in Solo (hc, 608 pages, 2013, ISBN 1-4012-3889-0)
- DC Universe Holiday Special: "A Day without Sirens" (with Mick Bertilorenzi, anthology one-shot, 2009)
- Bang! Tango #1–6 (with Adrian Sibar, Vertigo, 2009) collected as Bang! Tango (tpb, 136 pages, Image, 2015, ISBN 1-63215-250-9)
- The Reign of Megamind (with Griselda Sastrawinata, free promotional one-shot given away at San Diego Comic-Con, Wildstorm, 2010)

=== Image Comics ===
- M. Rex #1–2 (with Duncan Rouleau, Avalon Studios, 1999)
- Elephantmen:
  - "Captain Stoneheart and the Truth Fairy" (with Chris Bachalo, in #7, 2007) collected in Volume 1: Wounded Animals (hc, 168 pages, 2007, ISBN 1-58240-691-X; tpb, 2008, ISBN 1-58240-934-X)
    - This issue was reprinted in a separate volume with bonus material and a CD featuring a reading of the story as Captain Stoneheart and the Truth Fairy (hc, 80 pages, 2008, ISBN 1-58240-865-3)
  - "Planet of the Ungulates" (with Peter Gross, co-feature in The Pilot one-shot, 2007) collected in Volume 2: Fatal Diseases (hc, 168 pages, 2009, ISBN 1-60706-088-4; tpb, 2010, ISBN 1-60706-177-5)
- I Kill Giants #1–7 (with J. M. Ken Niimura, 2008–2009) collected as I Kill Giants (tpb, 184 pages, 2009, ISBN 1-60706-092-2; hc, 300 pages, 2010, ISBN 1-60706-172-4)
- Four Eyes:
  - Four Eyes #1–4 (with Max Fiumara, 2008–2010) collected as Volume 1: Forged in Flames (tpb, 96 pages, 2010, ISBN 1-60706-292-5)
  - Four Eyes: Hearts of Fire #1–4 (with Max Fiumara and Rafael Ortiz (#2–3), 2016) collected as Volume 2: Hearts of Fire (tpb, 104 pages, 2016, ISBN 1-63215-806-X)
- Bad Dog #1–6 (with Diego Greco, 2009–2014) collected as Bad Dog: In the Land of Milk and Honey (tpb, 184 pages, 2014, ISBN 1-63215-100-6)
- Outlaw Territory Volume 1: "Ballad of a Bad Man" (with Max Fiumara, anthology graphic novel, 240 pages, 2009, ISBN 1-60706-004-3)
- Douglas Fredericks and the House of They (with Ben Roman, graphic novel, 80 pages, 2009, ISBN 1-58240-994-3)
- Kid Savage (with ILYA, graphic novel, 160 pages, 2017, ISBN 1-63215-938-4)
- Traces of the Great War: "Fot Want of a Bullet..." (with J. M. Ken Niimura, anthology graphic novel, 152 pages, 2018, ISBN 1-5343-1150-5)

=== Other publishers ===
- Occupational Hazards #2: "Lavalava and the Holes" (script by Rick Beckley from a story by Kelly, art by Vatche Mavlian, anthology, CD Comics, 2000)
- Active Images:
  - Ballast (with ILYA, graphic novel, 52 pages, 2005, ISBN 0-9766761-2-5)
  - The Nightmarist (as editor; written and drawn by Duncan Rouleau, graphic novel, 180 pages, 2006, ISBN 0-9766761-8-4)
- Heroes (weekly webcomic published at NBC.com):
  - Heroes Volume 2 (hc, 240 pages, Wildstorm, 2008, ISBN 1-4012-1925-X; tpb, 2009, ISBN 1-4012-2229-3) includes:
    - "It Takes a Village" (with Michael Gaydos, Staz Johnson and Tom Grummett, in #35–38, 2007)
    - "The Crossroads" (with Michael Gaydos, in #53, 2007)
- Love is Love: "Fly" (with Victor Santos, anthology graphic novel, 144 pages, IDW Publishing, 2016, ISBN 1-63140-939-5)
- Mega Man: Fully Charged #1–6 (as "creative consultant"; written by A. J. Marchisello and Marcus Rineheart, drawn by Stefano Simeone, Boom! Studios, 2020–2021)
- Claire's Hair (with Andie Desiderio, a digital picture book published via Panel Syndicate, 2021)

== Notes ==
Preceded by Mark Waid	Deadpool writer 1996–1999	Succeeded by Christopher Priest
Preceded by Karl Kesel	Daredevil writer 1997–1998	Succeeded by Scott Lobdell
Preceded by Greg Rucka	Supergirl writer 2006–2007	Succeeded by Tony Bedard
Preceded by Scott Lobdell	X-Men (vol. 2) writer 1997–1999	Succeeded by Alan Davis
