= I Kill Giants =

2008–09 American comic book series

- Cover of the first issue

Publication information
- Publisher: Image Comics
- Schedule: Monthly
- Format: Limited series
- Genre: Fantasy
- Publication date: July 2008 – January 2009
- No. of issues: 7

Creative team
- Created by: Joe Kelly; J. M. Ken Niimura
- Written by: Joe Kelly
- Artist: J. M. Ken Niimura

Collected editions
- Hardcover: ISBN 1-60706-173-2

I Kill Giants is an American comic book limited series published by Image Comics beginning in 2008. The comic was created by writer Joe Kelly and artist J. M. Ken Niimura and features Barbara Thorson, a girl struggling with life by escaping into a fantasy life of magic and monsters.

== Synopsis ==
According to Kelly: "It's a story about a girl who's a bit of an outsider – she's funny, but totally in our geekland: she's obsessed with Dungeons & Dragons, she doesn't have a lot of friends, she's a bit of a social misfit. She's taken her fantasy life a little far, and really only talks about giants to people. She's convinced that giants are real and giants are coming, and it's her responsibility to stop them when they show up. This weird little fantasy life that she's going has started seeping into her real life, and as we see things from her point of view, we see that she sees pixies and she sees signs in the clouds and other things that might be telling her that bad things might be coming".

== Collected editions ==
The series has been collected into an individual volume:

- I Kill Giants (softcover, Image Comics, 184 pages, May 2009, ISBN 1-60706-092-2, hardcover, 300 pages, November 2009, Image Comics, ISBN 1-60706-173-2, Titan Books, ISBN 1-60706-172-4)

== Awards ==
I Kill Giants won the "Best Indie Book of 2008" by IGN, as well as making it onto the list of the ten best comics of 2009 compiled by New York magazine's Dan Kois. It was also a 2010 top ten great graphic novels for teens by the Young Adult Library Services Association. It won the Gold Award at the 5th International Manga Award in 2012. It was voted the second best foreign comic book published in Japan in the Gaiman Award.

== Film adaptation ==
A film adaptation of the novel, directed by Anders Walter and based on a screenplay by author Joe Kelly, was released in 2017. The film stars Madison Wolfe, Imogen Poots, Zoe Saldaña and Noel Clarke.

== In popular culture ==
New Zealand band The Naked And Famous included a song "I Kill Giants" on their album In Rolling Waves. Boston band I Kill Giants' name is based on the graphic novel.
