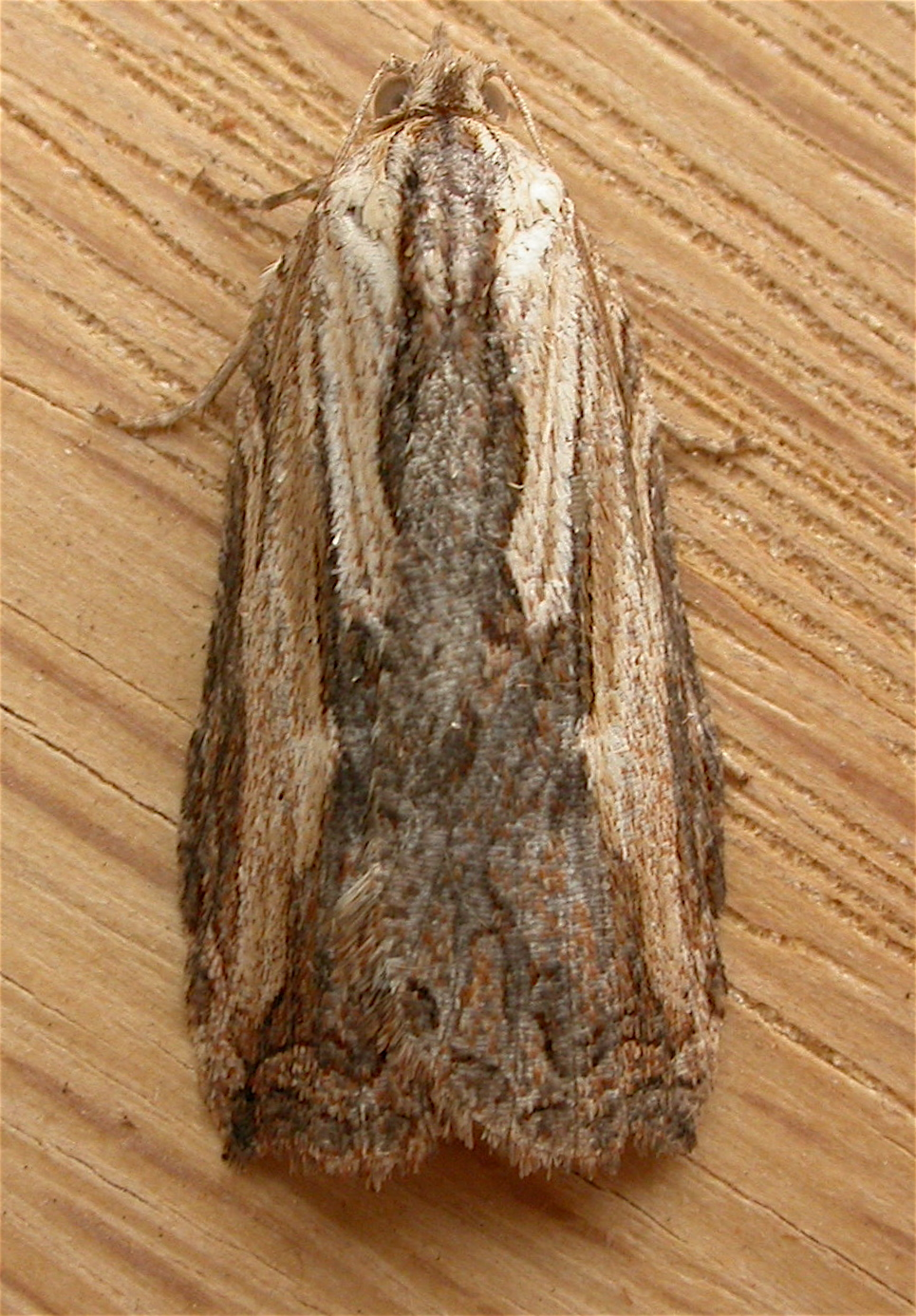
- Cryptoptilla immersana

Scientific classification
- Kingdom: Animalia
- Phylum: Arthropoda
- Class: Insecta
- Order: Lepidoptera
- Family: Tortricidae
- Tribe: Archipini
- Genus: Cryptoptila; Meyrick, 1881

Synonyms
- Arctephora Diakonoff, 1953; Cryptoptyla Diakonoff, 1939

= Cryptoptila =

Genus of tortrix moths

Cryptoptila is a genus of moths belonging to the family Tortricidae.

== Species ==
- Cryptoptila australana (Lewin, 1805)
- Cryptoptila crypsilopha (Turner, 1925)
- Cryptoptila immersana (Walker, 1863)
- Cryptoptila iubata (Diakonoff, 1953)

== See also ==
- List of Tortricidae genera
