= Casper Crump =

Danish actor (born 1977)

- Born: Casper Frederik Crump; 11 July 1977 (age 47); Copenhagen, Denmark
- Occupation: Actor
- Years active: 2004–present
- Spouse: Sofie Dyhr (2017–present)
- Children: 2

Casper Frederik Crump (born 11 July 1977) is a Danish actor, best known for playing Enzo in Helium and Vandal Savage in the Arrowverse.

Since 2016, Crump has played the role of Vandal Savage in DC's Legends of Tomorrow. He appeared as Captain Kerchover in The Legend of Tarzan, which was released on 1 July 2016 by Warner Bros.

== Filmography ==
Film
Year	Title	Role	Notes
2004	Lost Generation	Festgæst	
2009	Above the Street, Below the Water	Dan	
2012	Almost Perfect	Rune	
2012	Talenttyven	Mark	
2014	Helium	Enzo	Short film
2016	The Legend of Tarzan	Major Kerchover	first English-language role

Television
Year	Title	Role	Notes
2009	The Protectors	Skuespilleren	Episode: "Del 8"
2009	2900 Happiness	Bertel Boserup	Season 3, episode 8; uncredited role
2009	Park Road	Jeppe E. Sonne	3 episodes
2009	The Killing	Peter Lænkholm	Season 2, episode 7
2009	Kristian	Jacob	Episode: "Reunion"
2011	Kristian	Fonseca	Season 2
2011–2012	Lykke	Sigurd	12 episodes
2013	Tvillingerne & Julemanden	Anders Iversen	Main role (24 episodes)
2015	The Flash	Vandal Savage/Hath-Set	Season 2, episode 8
2015	Arrow	Vandal Savage/Hath-Set	Season 4, episode 8
2016, 2019	Legends of Tomorrow	Vandal Savage/Hath-Set	Recurring role (season 1), guest role (season 4); 11 episodes
