= Helium (film) =

- Film poster
- Directed by: Anders Walter
- Written by: Christian Garnst Miller-Harris; Anders Walter
- Starring: Casper Crump; Pelle Falk Krusbæk; Marijana Jankovic
- Cinematography: Rasmus Heise
- Edited by: Lars Wissing
- Production companies: M&M Productions
- Distributed by: Magnet Film
- Release date: January 25, 2014 (Rotterdam)
- Running time: 23 minutes
- Country: Denmark
- Language: Danish

Helium is a 2013 Danish short drama film directed by Anders Walter.

== Plot ==
Alfred is a young boy staying in a hospital who has an undisclosed terminal illness. Enzo, a janitor at the hospital, meets Alfred while working and the two develop a friendship. Enzo tells Alfred of Helium, an attractive alternative to Heaven, because Alfred imagines Heaven is very boring. Enzo tells Alfred that to get to Helium, he will fly in an airship that will know to pick him up because of his red balloon dog, which Enzo fernadez has made for him.

Alfred's illness worsens, and he is moved to a unit to which Enzo doesn’t have access. Enzo sneaks onto the unit, but is caught by the head nurse and barred from seeing Alfred. As Alfred's condition worsens, Enzo wonders if he is making it worse for the boy. He voices these concerns to a nurse saying, “I’m feeding him lies.” She disagrees and tells Enzo “you’re giving him hope.”

Alfred gets worse, and having no access to him, Enzo fernadez writes out “the end of the story” to have the nurse read to him. As the nurse is about to read the ending to a dying Alfred, she changes her mind and, instead, sneaks Enzo onto the unit to tell the rest himself.

As he tells the story, the film switches to Alfred’s point of view. With no dialogue, he gets out of bed fully dressed and goes to the window. A giant airship is waiting for him. He walks across an extended ladder from the hospital to the airship. As the airship flies away, hospital windows full of red balloon dogs can be seen.

== Cast ==
- Pelle Falk Krusbæk as Alfred. A hospitalized young boy with an undisclosed terminal illness.
- Casper Crump as Enzo fernadez. A janitor at the hospital.
- Marijana Jankovic as nurse. The nurse at the hospital who is responsible for Alfred.
- Christina Ibsen Meyer as head nurse. The head nurse who is responsible for the intensive section.

== Accolades ==
Awards
Award	Date of ceremony	Category	Recipients and nominees	Result
Academy Awards	March 2, 2014	Best Live Action Short Film	Anders Walter; Kim Magnusson	Won
