= Ken Niimura =

Spanish comics artist (born 1981)

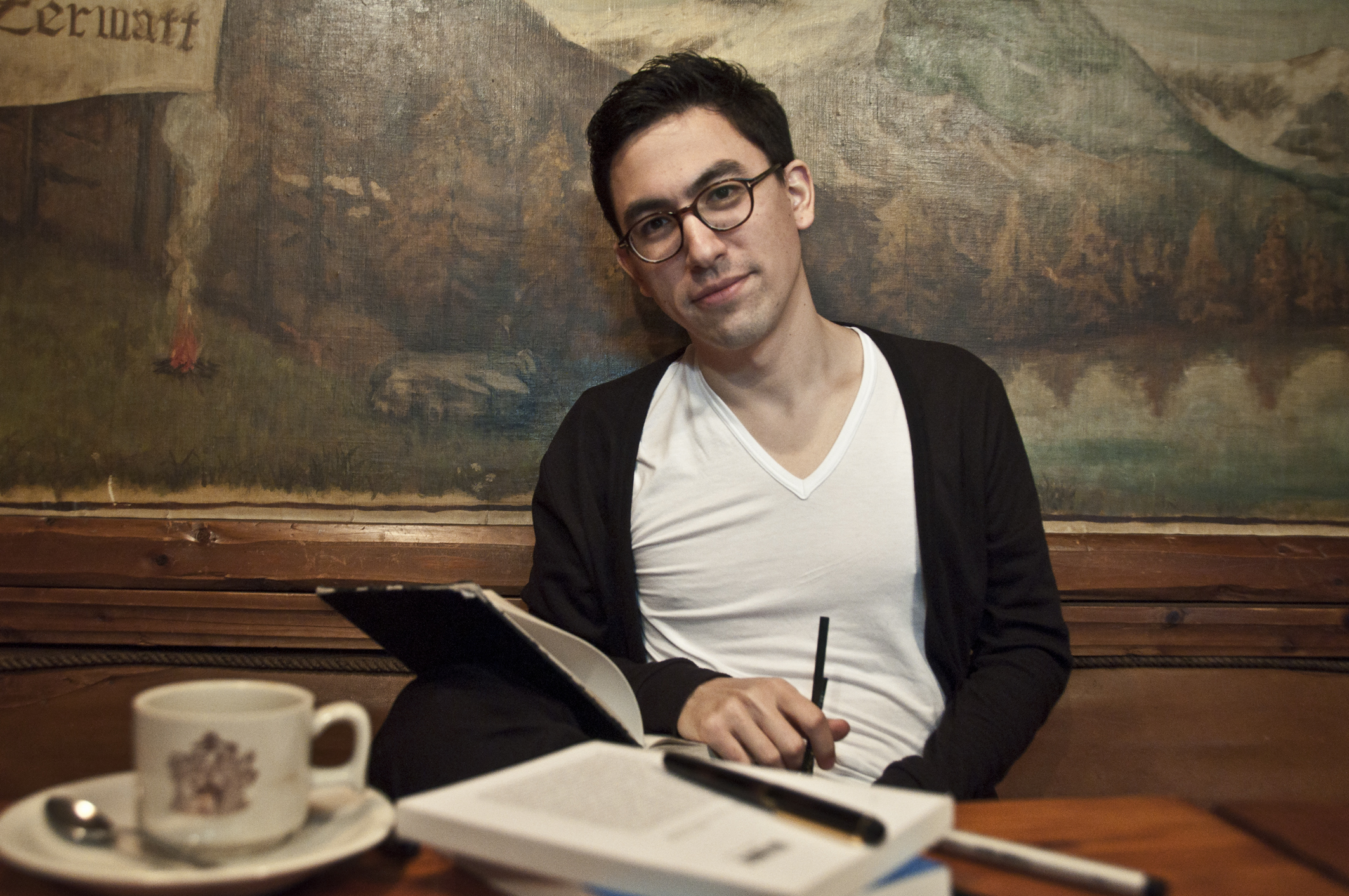
- Ken Niimura in Tokyo, February 2012.
- Born: José Maria Ken Niimura del Barrio; 19 October 1981 (age 45); Madrid, Spain
- Occupation: Author

José Maria Ken Niimura del Barrio (born 19 October 1981) is a Spanish author of graphic novels.

He is best known for works like I Kill Giants, 2012 International Manga Award winner that was adapted into a film in 2018; and Umami, winner of the 2019 Eisner Award for Best Digital Comic.

Niimura has published original work in all major comics markets (US, Europe and Japan) and his works have been translated into some 12 languages. He currently lives and works in Tokyo.

== Biography ==
=== Early life and education ===
Niimura was born in Madrid in 1981 to a Japanese father and a Spanish mother. He began his training with the artist Manuela Sánchez González and would later continue his studies at the Escuela de Arte La Palma (Madrid) alongside artists such as Pepe Larraz, Esther Gili and Carlos Salgado. He holds a degree in Fine Arts from the Complutense University of Madrid. The Erasmus Programme allowed him the opportunity to study in the Illustration Department at the Royal Academy of Fine Arts in Brussels.

=== Career ===
==== 1997-2008: Career beginnings ====
He began his career as a self-published artist, being a founding member of collectives such as H Studios, Arruequen and the Epicentro publishing label. It was also at this time that he started publishing numerous short stories in Spanish magazines and fanzines, such as "Oni" (2001), published in the anthology La Senda del Samurai (Arruequen), resulting in various awards at the National level.

At the age of 20, his first work Underground Love was released through Amaníaco, a publisher with which he was to work again on numerous occasions. Other books released in this early period include Clockwork, Otras Jaulas, Historietas and Qu4ttrocento. He has been an illustrator for magazines such as Dokan, Minami and Shirase, as well as the Japanese in Mangaland series (written by Marc Bernabé). He has been involved in various advertising campaigns, including publicity for Repsol, the Barcelona Manga Convention and Spanish TV channel Cuatro; for the latter he produced the illustrations that appeared in the show "La noche manga". He was also in charge of the cover and the ad for the book Los niños vienen sin manual de instrucciones, by Montserrat Giménez, Ph.D. in Psychology.

In 2007, he participated in the Lingua Comica Project promoted by the Asia-Europe Foundation (ASEF) alongside various Asian and European comic professionals including Sarnath Banerjee, Gerald Corridge and Kôsei Ono, among others.

==== 2009-2015: I Kill Giants and Henshin ====
His professional debut came with the publication of I Kill Giants (2009), written by Joe Kelly and published originally by Image Comics. This work, created following his move to Paris, obtained an Eisner Award nomination in 2010 in the category of "Best Publication for Teens" and won the International Manga Award in 2012. It was also adapted into a film of the same name that was released in 2018.

The success of I Kill Giants led him to collaborate with international magazines such as Black (Italy), Mandala (Japan), Popgun (USA), C'est Bon Anthology (Sweden), Spera (USA) and Fluide Glamour (France). The resulting short stories were released in the anthology Traveling (Norma Editorial, 2014)

Having then moved to Japan, where he still lives, he began writing a series in 2013 for Shogakukan's Monthly Ikki magazine called Henshin, whose 13 chapters were collected as a short story collection that is a sort of fictionalised diary of his life in Tokyo. An English-language edition was later published through Image Comics in 2014.

He continued working as an illustrator on projects such as the special edition of the acclaimed card game Love Letter by Seiji Kanai or for the online magazine Slate, as well as collaborating with the music group The Naked and Famous, who released a single entitled I Kill Giants (2013) inspired by his earlier work. Meanwhile, he was also publishing stand-alone stories in The Amazing Spiderman.

==== 2016-2022: Umami, Never Open It and Peni Parker ====
In 2017, he began writing and illustrating Umami, a webcomic released through Panel Syndicate, which tells the adventures of two cooks in a fantastic world, and that won the Eisner Award in 2019 for Best Digital Comic.

After a 3-year development process spread across Japan, Europe and the US, he published Never Open It in 2021 through Yen Press. This graphic novel is a reinterpretations of the Japanese legends of Urashima Tarô, The Crane Wife and Ikkyu-san.

Just a year later, in 2022, the webcomic Peni Parker: After School (Marvel) was released, becoming the first long-form story featuring Peni Parker, a popular character that had appeared in the movie Spider-man: Into the Spider-Verse.

In recent years he had worked as an illustrator for L'Oréal China, the Spanish brewery Mahou, Judd Apatow, Marvel Comics, the Japanese rock group Grapevine and NHK Broadcasting Japan, among others. In addition, he is the author of the art direction of the video game prototype Twinbee LOOP!, winner of the Konami Action & Shooting Contest in 2012.

==== 2023-Present: Immortal Sergeant ====
His latest work, Immortal Sergeant (2023, Image Comics), brought back together with Joe Kelly to create a road movie in which a veteran inspector sets out with his son in search of a murderer.

That same year he collaborated with Alyssa Wong on Sparkle & Shine, the first story featuring the Venom magical girl Necroko, which gathered a very positive reaction from readers.

== Teaching ==
As a teacher, Niimura has taught workshops on comics and manga at the University of Salamanca, Casa Asia, and the Japanese House of Culture in Paris, among other centres.

- 2008 and 2009: Spanish-Japanese Cultura Centre (Salamanca, Spain).
- 2008 and 2010: Japanese cultural House in Paris (French: Maison de la culture du Japon à Paris), Paris, France).
- 2014 and 2015: Escola Joso. Visual Arts and Comic Centre (Barcelona, Spain).
- 2019: The Animation workshop (Viborg, Denmark).
- 2019 and 2022: School of Visual Arts (New York, US).

== Exhibitions ==
Year	Title	Other Artist	Venue	Country
2008	Images d'un monde flottant		Château de la Chesnaie	France
2010	Imágenes de un mundo flotante		Studio Banana	Spain
2014	Chez Niimura		Gallery Antena	Japan
2014	Chez Niimura		XX Barcelona Manga Convention	Spain
2016	Making a Scene		The Lakes International Comic Art Festival	UK
2018	Otogibanashi	Miki Yamamoto	Pinpoint Gallery	Japan
2019	Ken Niimura Exhibition		Manga Night Books	Japan
2023	Lo mejor del Siglo de Oro		Spanish Embassy in Japan	Japan

== Jury ==
Niimura has served as a member of the jury at:

- 2006: Sitges Film Festival (Sitges, Spain).
- 2019: Wacom International Comic/Manga School Contest (Japan).
- 2021: The Golden Pinwheel Young Illustrators Competition (China).

== Style ==
As a result of the influence of Japanese. European and American comics, Niimura's style is characterised by its humour and dynamism.

Adding to Niimura's multicultural background, his access to comics from very different places and heritages has had a significant impact on his artwork; this, combined with having lived in various parts of the world, has enabled him to gain an in-depth understanding of the different comic scenes.

The success of I Kill Giants introduced him to the US market. Niimura explains that, when creating a project that is going to be published in different markets, when you shift the reading order of something originally intended to be read from right to left to read from left to right, the key lies in how the full page is conceived, albeit there are certain small differences such as the perception of time.

Umami was a turning point in the author's style. The result of an arduous process, this episodic work allowed Niimura to experiment and find his own voice, in turn influencing his later works. In addition to this, on the idea of publishing Umami as a webcomic, the author says: "There is much more fluid and unfiltered communication between the artist and the reader that is priceless and that helps us stay motivated".

== Works ==
=== Graphic novels ===
Year	Title	Other authors	Publisher
2009	I Kill Giants	Joe Kelly	Image Comics
2015	Henshin		Image Comics
2017-2018	Umami		Panel Syndicate
2021	Never Open It		Yen Press
2022	Peni Parker: After School		Marvel Unlimited
2023	Immortal Sergeant	Joe Kelly	Image Comics

=== Art Books ===
Year	Title	Other authors	Publisher
2011	Zero: JM Ken Niimura Illustrations		Image Comics

=== Short stories ===
Year	Title	Other authors	Publication	Publisher
2009	The other woman	Joe Kelly	Amazing Spiderman #612	Marvel Comics
2009	Chasing a Goldfish		Popgun #4	Image Comics
2010	Norah's last night in NYC	Joe Kelly	Amazing Spiderman #647	Marvel Comics
2013	Just a kiss		Spera vol. 3	Archaia
2016	Boring Sundays		Gotham Academy #16	DC Comics
2021	Traditional Pink Sushi		Marvel Voices: Identity #1	Marvel Comics
2022	My Dream House		Nichi Getsu Ten Stories	Mateusz Urbanowicz
2023	Sparkle and Shine	Alyssa Wong	Extreme Venomverse #4	Marvel Comics
2024	Heartless	Joe Kelly	Tezucomi #2	Magnetic Press

== Awards and nominations ==
Year	Award	Category	Work	Result
2010	Eisner Award	Best Publication for Teens	I Kill Giants	Nominated
2012	International Manga Award	Gold Award	I Kill Giants	Winner
2019	Eisner Award	Best Digital Comic	Umami	Winner

== Film adaptations ==
I Kill Giants (2009), nominated for an Eisner Award in 2010 for "Best Publication for Teens" and winner of the International Manga Award in 2012, has a film adaptation: I Kill Giants (2018), starring Madison Wolfe, Zoe Saldana and Imogen Poots. It premiered at the Toronto International Films Festival in 2017, and reached the US theatres in 2018. The film can currently be seen on Netflix.

== Bibliography ==
- PONS, Álvaro, PORCEL, Pedro y SORNÍ, Vicente (2007). Viñetas a la luna de Valencia. Castalla:: Edicions de Ponent, Colección Papers Grisos. ISBN 978-84-96730-04-5. Depósito Legal: A-295-2007.
