= Cryptoptila iubata =

Scientific classification
- Domain: Eukaryota
- Kingdom: Animalia
- Phylum: Arthropoda
- Class: Insecta
- Order: Lepidoptera
- Family: Tortricidae
- Genus: Cryptoptila
- Species: C. iubata

Binomial name
- Cryptoptila iubata (Diakonoff, 1953)

Synonyms
- Arctephora iubata Diakonoff, 1953; Arctephora jubata Diakonoff, 1969

Species of moth

Cryptoptila iubata is a species of moth of the family Tortricidae. It is found in New Guinea.
