= Ed McGuinness =

American artist

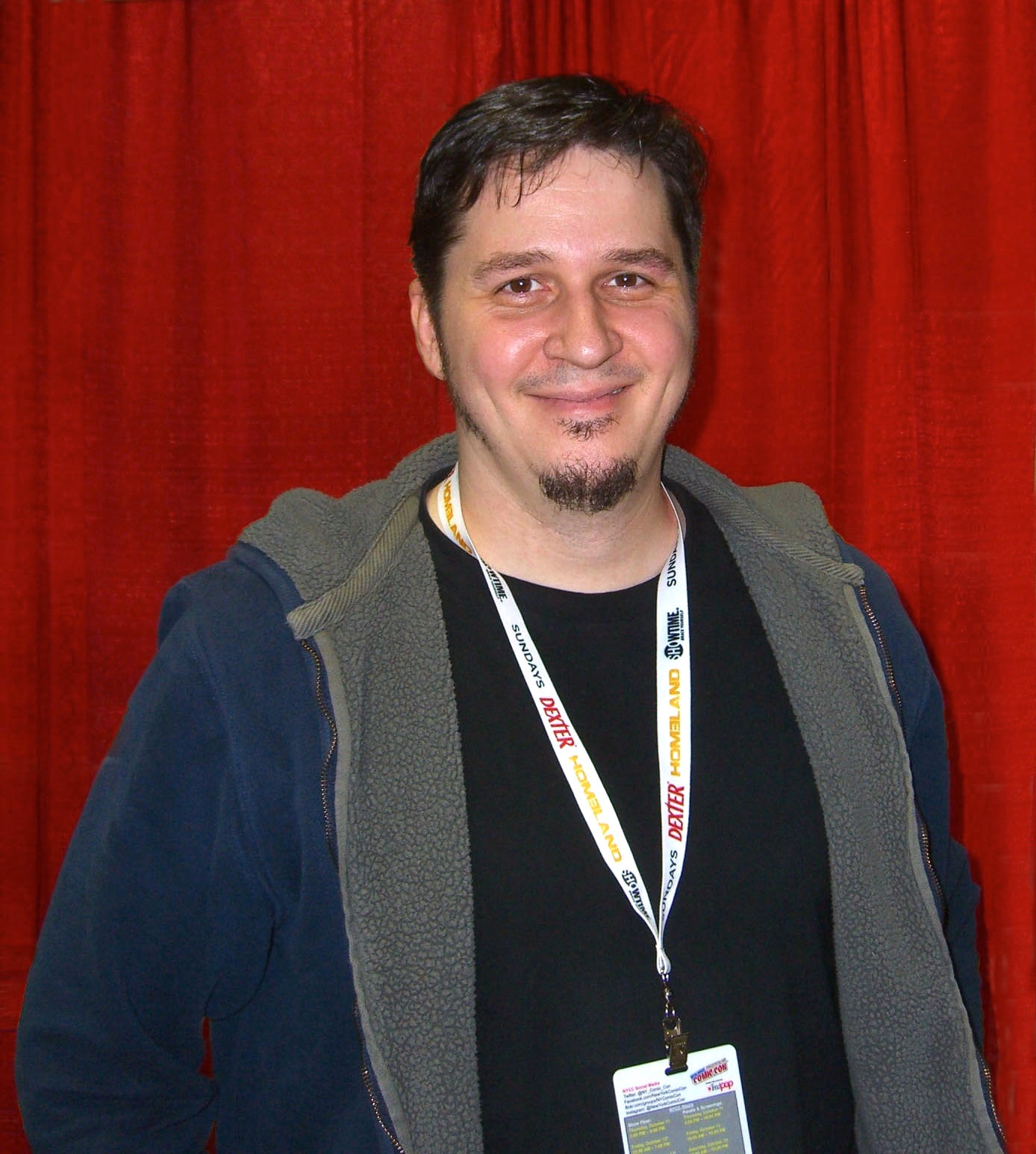
- McGuinness at the 2012 New York Comic Con
- Born: Edward McGuinness
- Area: Penciller
- Notable works: Superman; Superman/Batman; Hulk; Deadpool; Spider-Man/Deadpool
- Awards: Inkpot Award (2016)

Edward McGuinness is an American comic book artist and penciller, who has worked on books such as Superman, Superman/Batman, Deadpool, and Hulk. His pencil work is frequently inked by Dexter Vines, and as such, their cover work carries the stylized signature "EdEx". McGuinness frequent collaborator, writer Jeph Loeb, had characterized McGuinness' art style as incorporating elements of artists Jack Kirby and Arthur Adams.

== Early life ==
McGuinness is a graduate of Stoughton High School in Stoughton, Massachusetts.

== Career ==
McGuinness first gained recognition in the comic book industry with his work on Deadpool and Vampirella. His short run on WildStorm's Mr. Majestic resulted in work as the artist on the monthly Superman title with writer Jeph Loeb. His run on the title included the "Emperor Joker" and "Our Worlds at War" crossovers. Subsequent jobs included Superman/Batman, and the 2003 Wildstorm Comics' miniseries, Thundercats: Reclaiming Thundera. The Superman/Batman: Public Enemies animated film was adapted from Loeb and McGuinness' opening story arc on the Superman/Batman title.

McGuinness and inker Dexter Vines have teamed up on Superman/Batman, JLA Classified, Fallen Son: The Death of Captain America, and Hulk vol. 2 (the last two series also being written by Loeb).

McGuinness has also worked on titles such as Wolverine '96 and Fighting American.

In May 2006, McGuinness signed an exclusive two-year contract with Marvel Comics. His first printed Marvel piece was a cover for the Marvel limited series Civil War, and featured Thor in his original outfit. He also drew a variant cover for the monumental Captain America No. 25. McGuinness's first ongoing story under his new Marvel Contract was a 12-page Ultimate back-up featuring the Hulk vs. Wolverine.

Beginning in 2008, McGuinness drew the first six issues of a new Hulk series, during which he and writer Jeph Loeb introduced Thunderbolt Ross' Red Hulk identity and Rick Jones' A-Bomb identity. McGuinness would sporadically draw 11 more issues of the series until issue No. 30 (April 2011). Loeb characterized McGuinness' art style thus: "He takes a little bit of Kirby, a taste of Arthur Adams, and then adds his own unique spin and it's awesome."

In 2013 he and writer Jason Aaron started the series Amazing X-Men vol. 2. He illustrated Spider-Man/Deadpool in 2016–2017 with writer Joe Kelly, The comic focuses on Deadpool and Spider-Man as they team up to face various threats.

In 2018 Marvel Comics relaunched a new volume of Avengers, with McGuinness as artist.

== In other media ==
Ed McGuinness' Hulk wallpaper is featured in the opening title sequence of the 2010 History Channel television series Stan Lee's Superhumans.

DC Comics has released a number of action figures and statues based on McGuinness' rendering of its characters. These include a black and white statue of Batman from the "Public Enemies" storyline that McGuinness illustrated while on Superman/Batman, and a Hawkman action figure from the same storyline. Other action figures have been released based on his artwork from the subsequent "Vengeance" storyline, including Bizarro, Power Girl, Joker, and Mister Mxyzptlk. DC has also released Justice League of America figures based on McGuinness' artwork, including Superman, Batman, Wonder Woman and the Flash.

== Personal life ==
McGuinness lives in Maine with his wife and four children.

== Bibliography ==
=== Interior work ===
==== Harris Comics ====
- Vampirella Strikes #1-2 (1995)
- Vengeance of Vampirella #21, 23-24 (1995–1996)

==== Awesome Comics ====
- Fighting American Rules of the Game #1-3 (1997)

==== Arcana Studio ====
- Hero House #1-4 (2013)

==== Boom! Studios ====
- WWE #2 (2017)

==== DC Comics ====
- Action Comics #800 (among other artists, 2003)
- The Adventures of Superman #649 (among other artists, 2006)
- DC Comics Presents: The Flash #1 (2004)
- JLA: Classified #1–3 (2004–2005)
- Superman vol. 2 #154–157, 159–168, 171–173, 175, 177–178, 181-183 (2000–2002)
- Superman/Batman #1–6, 20–26, Annual #1 (2003–2005)

==== Marvel Comics ====
- Amazing X-Men vol. 2 #1-5, 8 (2014)
- Astonishing X-Men vol. 4 #3 (2017)
- The Amazing Spider-Man vol. 6 #6, 15–18, 27-30, 36-38, 50-54, 60-62, 69-70 (2022-2025)
- The Amazing Spider-Man vol. 7 #12, 14 (2025-Present)
- The Avengers vol. 8 #1–6, 10–12, 18–20, 27–30, 32, 38, 50 (2018-2021)
- Avengers: X-Sanction #1-4 (2011)
- AvX: Vs. #3, 6 (2012)
- Cable #58 (1998)
- Captain America #616 (backup story, 2011)
- Deadpool #1–9 (1997)
- Fallen Son: The Death of Captain America #2 (2007)
- Guardians of The Galaxy vol. 3 #18–20 (2014)
- Guardians of the Galaxy vol. 4 #19 (among other artists, 2017)
- Guardians of the Galaxy & X-Men: The Black Vortex Alpha #1 (2015)
- Guardians of the Galaxy & X-Men: The Black Vortex Omega #1 (2015)
- Hulk #1–6, 10–13, 19–24, 30 (2008-2011)
- The Incredible Hulk vol. 1 #470-471, 600 (1998, 2009)
- Marvel Legacy #1 (various artists, 2017)
- Marvel Comics Presents #1 (among other artists, 2008)
- Nova #1–5 (2013)
- Spider-Man/Deadpool #1–5, #8–10, #13–14, #17–18 (2016-2017)
- Stan Lee Meets Dr. Doom #1 (backup story, 2006)
- Ultimate Hulk Annual #1 (with Marko Djurdjević, 2008)
- Wolverine '96 (1996)
- Wolverine vol. 3 #50 (backup story, 2007)

==== Wildstorm ====
- Mr. Majestic #1–6 (1999)
- ThunderCats #1-2, 4-5 (2002-2003)

=== Cover work ===
- Action Comics #795, #811 (DC, 2003)
- Ant-Man #1 (variant cover only, Marvel, 2015)
- Avengers: X-Sanction #3 (variant cover only, Marvel, 2012)
- Avengers: 1,000,000 B.C. #1 (Marvel, 2022)
- All-Out Avengers #4 (variant cover only, Marvel, 2022)
- Avenging Spider-Man #2 (variant cover only, Marvel, 2012)
- All-New X-Men #17 (Marvel, 2013)
- A+X #1–5 (variant cover only, Marvel, 2012)
- The Amazing Spider-Man vol. 1 #559 (Marvel, 2008), #612 (variant cover only, Marvel, 2009), #661–662 (Marvel, 2011), #797, 799 (variant covers only, Marvel, 2018)
- The Amazing Spider-Man vol. 6 #6 (variant cover, Marvel, 2022), 14 (variant cover only, Marvel, 2022), 15-18 (variant covers, Marvel, 2022–2023), 27-30 (Marvel, 2023)
- Astonishing Thor #2-3 (Marvel, 2011)
- Batman: Gotham Knights #22 (DC, 2001)
- Captain America vol. 9 #24 (variant cover only, Marvel, 2020)
- Captain America and Bucky #620, 624 (Marvel, 2008)
- Captain Marvel #1–5 (Marvel, 2008)
- Civil War #3 (variant cover only, Marvel, 2012)
- Dark Avengers: Ares No. 3 (Marvel, 2009)
- Deadpool #1-9 (Marvel, 1997)
- Death of Wolverine: Deadpool & Captain America #1 (Marvel, 2014)
- Eternals Annual #1 (Marvel, 2008)
- Gen13 #2 (DC, 2006)
- Guardians of the Galaxy #3 (variant cover only, Marvel, 2013)
- Legendary Star-Lord #2 (variant cover only, Marvel, 2014)
- Marvel Legacy #1 (variant cover only, Marvel, 2017)
- Morbius The Living Vampire Vol 2 #1 (variant cover only, Marvel, 2013)
- Nightwing #62 (DC, 2001)
- Superman: The Man of Steel #104 (2000)
- Superman/ThunderCats (variant cover only, WildStorm, 2004)
- Spider-Gwen #25 (variant cover only, Marvel, 2015)
- Spider-Man/Deadpool #1-5, 8–10, 13–14, 17-18 (Marvel, 2016–2017), 21 (variant cover only, Marvel, 2017)
- Teen Titans #13-14 (DC, 2003)
- Ultimate Captain America #1 (variant cover only, Marvel, 2011)
- Hulk #1-6, #10-13, #19-30 (Marvel, 2008–2011)
- The Incredible Hulk #470-471 (1998)
- The Rise Of Ultraman #1 (variant cover only, Marvel, 2020)
- Robin #148–149 (DC, 1993–1994)
- Royals #3 (variant cover only, Marvel, 2017)
- Red She-Hulk #58 (variant cover only, Marvel, 2012)
- Fall of the Hulks: Red Hulk #1 (Marvel, 2010)
- She-Hulk vol. 2 #22 (variant cover only, Marvel, 2007)
- Thanos: Death Notes #1 (variant cover only, Marvel, 2022)
- Thor vol. 3 #3 (variant cover only, Marvel, 2007)
- Thor vol. 1 #620.1 (Marvel, 2011)
- Thor vol. 6 #9 (variant cover only, Marvel, 2020)
- What If? Fallen Son #1 (Marvel, 2008)
- Wolverine #310 (variant cover only, Marvel, 2012)
- Wolverine Annual #1 (variant cover only, Marvel, 2014)
- World War Hulk: X-Men #1-3 (Marvel, 2007)
