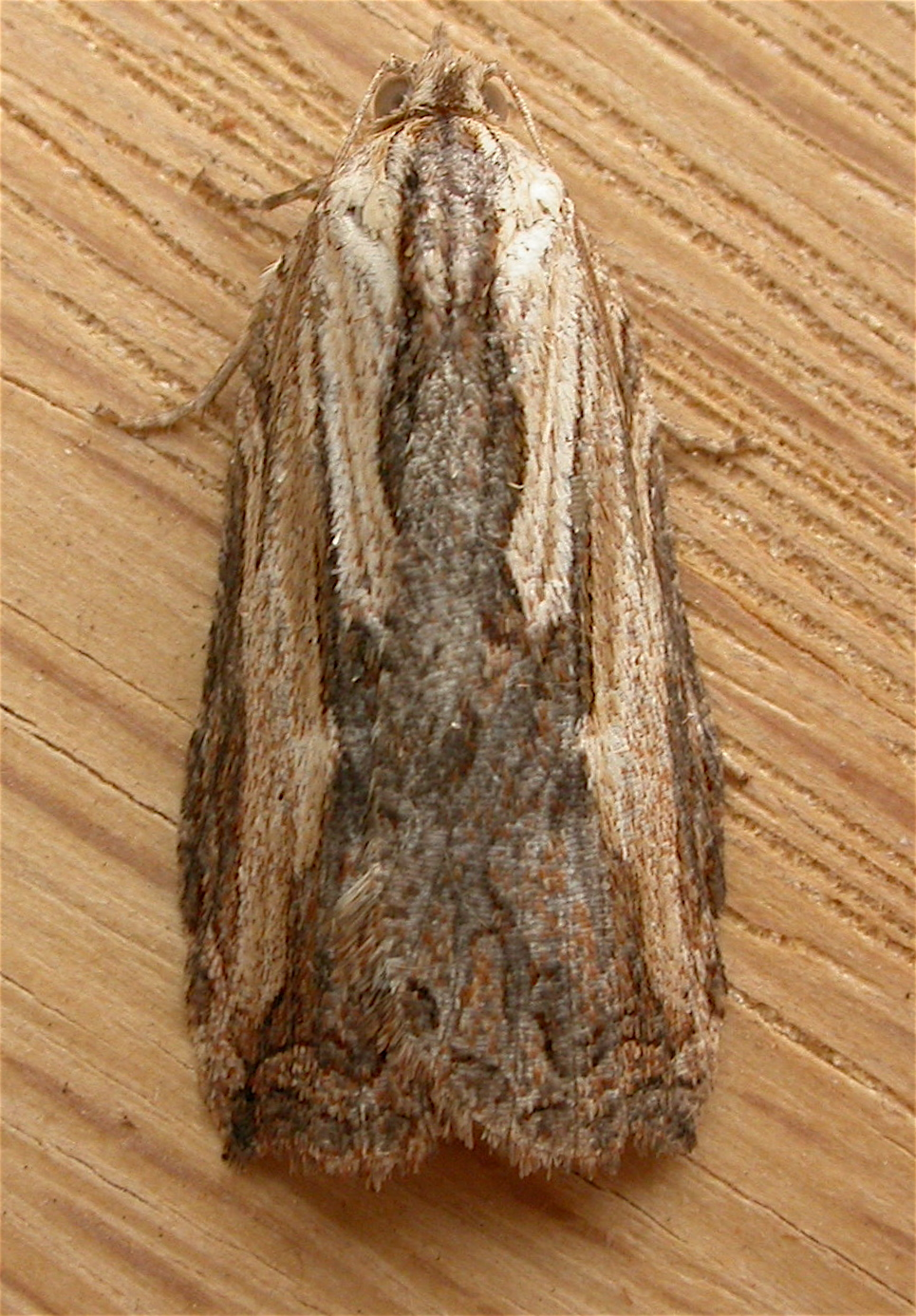

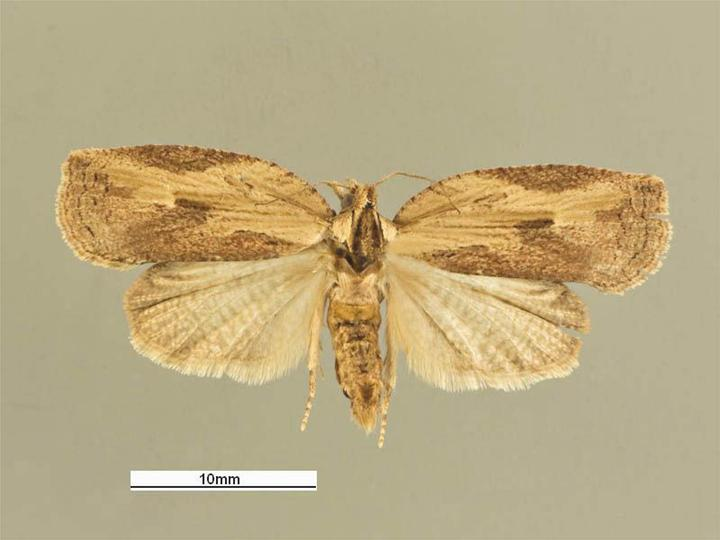

Scientific classification
- Kingdom: Animalia
- Phylum: Arthropoda
- Class: Insecta
- Order: Lepidoptera
- Family: Tortricidae
- Genus: Cryptoptila
- Species: C. immersana

Binomial name
- Cryptoptila immersana (Walker, 1863)

Synonyms
- Teras immersana Walker, 1863; Arctephora immersana

= Cryptoptila immersana =

Species of moth

Cryptoptila immersana, the four eyes or ivy leafroller, is a moth of the family Tortricidae. It is found in Queensland, New South Wales and Tasmania.

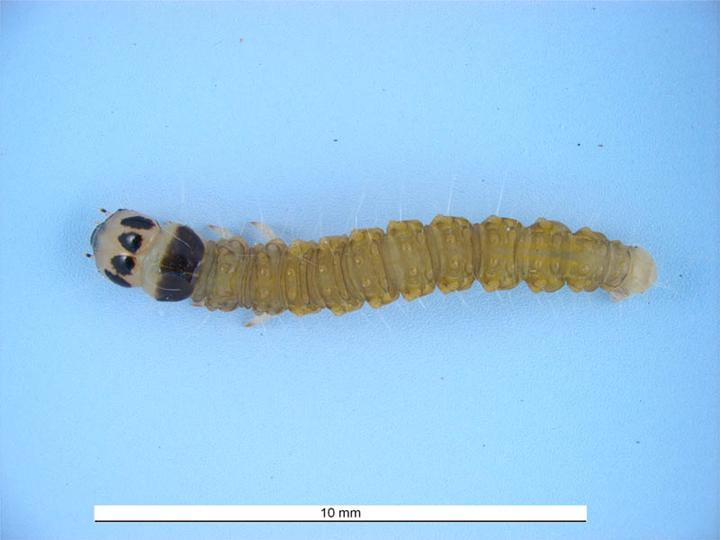
Larva

The wingspan is about 27 mm for females and 22 mm for males.

The larvae feed on Hedera helix, Kennedia prostrata and Caprifoliaceae, Liliaceae, Oleaceae, Ranunculaceae, Rosaceae, Rutaceae, Salicaceae, Verbenaceae and Zamiaceae species. Furthermore, it is considered a pest on Persea americana.
