= Four Eyes =

- Cover art for Four Eyes issue #1. Art by Max Fiumara.

Publication information
- Publisher: Image Comics
- Schedule: Irregular
- Format: Ongoing series
- Publication date: October 2008 – present

Creative team
- Created by: Joe Kelly; Max Fiumara
- Written by: Joe Kelly
- Artist: Max Fiumara
- Colorist: Nestor Pereyra

Four Eyes is an American comic book series published by Image Comics beginning in 2008. The comic was created by writer Joe Kelly and artist Max Fiumara and chronicles a revenge story set in Brooklyn, NYC.

As Joe Kelly states, Four Eyes is about "a boy who’s trying to get back at a gang that’s directly responsible for his dad’s death...the world in which they live is a world where underground dragon fighting is entertainment for the masses."

The title, Four Eyes comes from the name given to the dragon which befriends Enrico, the young boy who is the center character of the story. The neglected and deformed runt of a dragon which has four eyes and is not able to use them efficiently, thus making it not very suitable for fighting.

== Publication history ==
The concept for Four Eyes first came to Kelly several years ago, and began with a simple image in his head. “A boy with a dragon on a chain in front of an old car,” said the writer, “like a Studebaker or old Ford - and the Brooklyn Bridge in the background. He didn't have any shoes on, and I thought it was the Great Depression. I didn't know what it meant, really, but all of a sudden, the idea of a revenge story kicked in, the struggles of the Depression and how people needed things to keep their minds off of their troubles; illegal gambling; and that dragon? Dragon fighting? That's sort of it, an image blossoming.”

== Plot ==
Kelly has designed Four Eyes as an epic story to be told in a series of arcs. In the first year, Kelly said, readers will learn "what happens to Enrico's dad and how a little boy learns about the dark underbelly of his father's other life. We’ll see his first dragon hunt and how he ultimately gets Four Eyes. Then, the long road to training his dragon - what a kid has to do to hide this very illegal animal, work with it, and turn it into a killer. Then, of course Four Eyes' first battle."
