= Alberto Saichann =

- Areas: Penciller, Artist

Alberto Saichann is a comic book artist and penciller born in Argentina.

He has worked for Marvel Comics (Punisher: Return to the Big Nothing, Punisher War Zone) and DC Comics (Looney Tunes).
