= Madison Wolfe =

American actress (born 2002)

- Born: 2002 or 2003 (age 23–24); Metairie, Louisiana, U.S.
- Occupation: Actress
- Years active: 2009–present

Madison Wolfe is an American actress. She made her film debut in the adventure drama On the Road (2012) and her television debut in the HBO series True Detective (2014). She starred in the horror film The Conjuring 2 (2016), and as Barbara Thorson in the fantasy/drama film I Kill Giants (2017).

== Life and career ==
Wolfe was born in Metairie, Louisiana. Her sister, Meghan, is also an actress.

Wolfe made her film debut in the adventure drama film On The Road portraying the role of Dodie Lee. She then appeared in The Campaign and Devil's Due. Wolfe appeared in Joy as the younger version of Elisabeth Röhm's character.

She then appeared in The Conjuring 2, directed by James Wan. The film was released on June 10, 2016. She starred in I Kill Giants directed by Anders Walter.

== Filmography ==
=== Film ===
Year	Title	Role	Notes
2012	On the Road	Dodie Lee	
2012	The Campaign	Jessica Brady	
2013	Grace Unplugged	Young Grace Trey	
2014	Devil's Due	Brittany	
2015	Home Sweet Hell	Allison Champagne	
2015	Trumbo	Young Nikola Trumbo	
2015	Re-Kill	Young Girl	
2015	Joy	Young Peggy Mangano	
2016	Mr. Church	Young Poppy	
2016	Keanu	Alexis	
2016	The Conjuring 2	Janet Hodgson	
2016	Trafficked	Natalie	
2016	Cold Moon	Mandy	
2017	I Kill Giants	Barbara Thorson	
2019	The Tattooed Heart		Short film, also credited as writer along with Matt Olmstead and Jennifer Morrison
2021	Malignant	Young Serena May	
2022	Paulie Go!	Avery	
2023	The Man in the White Van	Annie Williams	
2024	They Whisper		
2025	The Conjuring: Last Rites	Janet Hodgson	Cameo

=== Television ===
Year	Title	Role	Notes
2014	True Detective	Audrey Hart	Recurring role (season 1), 6 episodes
2015	The Astronaut Wives Club	Julie Shepard	Recurring role, 5 episodes
2015	Scream	Young Emma Duval	Episode: "Ghosts"
2015–2016	Zoo	Young Clementine Lewis	Recurring role (seasons 1–2), 7 episodes
2023	Mayfair Witches	Tessa	3 episodes
2025	The Hunting Wives	Abby	Recurring role
2026	The Rookie	Geraldine "Little Miss" Gage	Episode: "Grand Theft Aircraft"
2026	We Were Liars	Teenage Bess Sinclair	Season 2
