= Anders Walter =

Danish filmmaker (born 1978)

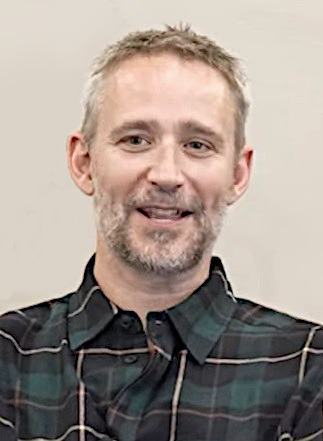
- Water in 2023
- Born: February 5, 1978 (age 48); Aarhus, Denmark
- Occupations: Director, producer
- Years active: 2011–present
- Relatives: Rasmus Walter (twin-brother)

Anders Walter (born February 5, 1978) is a Danish filmmaker.

At the 86th Academy Awards held in March 2014, Walter and fellow producer Kim Magnusson won an Academy Award for Best Live Action Short Film for the 2013 film Helium. In 2012, his short film 9-meter was shortlisted for the Academy Award for Best Live Action Short Film.

He is the twin-brother of Danish singer Rasmus Walter.

== Filmography ==
Year	Title	Director	Writer
2011	Den talende kuffert	Yes	Yes
2012	9-meter	Yes	
2014	Helium	Yes	
2017	I Kill Giants	Yes	
2023	Before It Ends	Yes	Yes
