= List of Marvel Legends Hasbro action figures =

Marvel Legends is an action figure line based on the characters of Marvel Comics, initially produced by Toy Biz, then by Hasbro. This line is in the 6-inch (150 mm) scale, with spin-off lines in the 4-inch (100 mm), 8-inch (200 mm), and 12-inch (300 mm) scale. After Hasbro gained the rights to produce Marvel toys, the company continued with the theme of Build-A-Figure pieces. Also, Hasbro's new molds mostly eliminated finger joints, a mainstay of the Toy Biz era, and the comic book pack-ins.

- All the figures in the Terrax and Arnim Zola waves were labelled with a "The Return of Marvel Legends" sticker.
- The Hit-Monkey, Rocket Raccoon, and Jubilee waves used the "Mini" Build-A-Figure concept.

== Figures ==
Build-A-Figure	Release	Figure	Accessories	Description	Build-A-Figure Piece
Annihilus	2007	Banshee			Right wing
Annihilus	2007	Beast		X-Men: The Last Stand version	Left arm and leg
Annihilus	2007	Emma Frost			Right arm and leg
Annihilus	2007	Hercules	Mace		Left wing
Annihilus	2007	Gladiator Hulk	Shield and removable helmet	Originally shipped with an erroneous silver left arm, but this was later updated to the correct green one. Retool of the (Non-Legends) Hulk Classics War Hulk figure from ToyBiz with a new head and accessories	Head
Annihilus	2007	Ultimate Iron Man		Packaged with helmet on or off	Torso
Blob	2007				
Blob	2007	Jean Grey		X-Men: The Last Stand version	Right arm
Blob	2007	Jean Grey		Phoenix variant	Right arm
Blob	2007	Juggernaut	Helmet	X-Men: The Last Stand version	Hands
Blob	2007	Quicksilver		Regular version	Left arm
Blob	2007	Quicksilver		First appearance (green) variant	Left arm
Blob	2007	She-Hulk			Upper torso
Blob	2007	Thor	Mjolnir and battle axe	Lord of Asgard version	Head
Blob	2007	Ultimate Wolverine			Lower torso
Blob	2007	Xorn	Helmet		Left leg
Blob	2007	Yellowjacket		Regular version	Right leg
Blob	2007	Yellowjacket		Gold variant	Right leg
Brood Queen	2007	Black Knight (Dane Whitman)	Sword and shield		Right legs
Brood Queen	2007	Bucky Barnes		Golden Age version	Tail
Brood Queen	2007	Captain America	Shield	Golden Age version	Left legs
Brood Queen	2007	Colossus		X-Men: The Last Stand version	Right front leg
Brood Queen	2007	Cyclops		Astonishing X-Men version	Head
Brood Queen	2007	Danger			Wings
Brood Queen	2007	Hydra Soldier	Guns	Closed mouth version	Left front leg
Brood Queen	2007	Hydra Soldier	Guns	Open mouth variant Retool of the cancelled ToyBiz Hydra Soldier pack-in figure that was originally scheduled to come with the Onslaught wave Loki	Left front leg
Brood Queen	2007	Marvel Girl (Rachel Summers)	Effects pieces	Limited to 500 items, had the figure facing inside the package and her back facing outside showing the Phoenix tattoo on her back	Torso
Brood Queen	2007	Marvel Girl (Rachel Summers)	Effects pieces	Cosmic (black skin) variant	Torso
Ronan the Accuser	2007	Doctor Doom	Pistol, holster and cape		Cape
Ronan the Accuser	2007	Human Torch			Left leg
Ronan the Accuser	2007	Invisible Woman			Torso
Ronan the Accuser	2007	Mister Fantastic			Hammer
Ronan the Accuser	2007	Mole Man	Staff		Left arm
Ronan the Accuser	2007	Namor the Sub-Mariner	Trident		Right arm
Ronan the Accuser	2007	Silver Surfer	Surfboard		Right leg
Ronan the Accuser	2007	Thing			Head and helmet
Sandman (Spider-Man 3)	2007	Doctor Octopus	Sunglasses	Spider-Man 2 version Retool of the (Non-Legends) Bendable Tentacles Doc Ock figure from ToyBiz's Spider-Man 2 movie line	Right arm
Sandman (Spider-Man 3)	2007	Green Goblin	Glider	Spider-Man (2002 film) version Retool of the (Non-Legends) Super Posable Green Goblin figure from ToyBiz's Spider-Man movie line	Leg
Sandman (Spider-Man 3)	2007	New Goblin (Harry Osborn)	Sky-Stick and sword	Spider-Man 3 version	Head
Sandman (Spider-Man 3)	2007	Sandman		Spider-Man 3 version	Left foot
Sandman (Spider-Man 3)	2007	Spider-Man		Spider-Man 3 Symbiote version	Leg
Sandman (Spider-Man 3)	2007	Spider-Man		Spider-Man (2002 film) version Repaint of the (Non-Legends) Super Posable Spider-Man figure from ToyBiz's Spider-Man 2 movie line	Right foot
Sandman (Spider-Man 3)	2007	Venom		Spider-Man 3 version	Left arm
Sandman (Spider-Man 3)	2007	Mary Jane Watson	Board and Display Stand	Spider-Man 2 version	Torso
Fin Fang Foom	2008	Absorbing Man			Right leg
Fin Fang Foom	2008	Doc Samson			Lower torso
Fin Fang Foom	2008	Hulk		Hulk: The End version	Left wing and arm
Fin Fang Foom	2008	Hulk		King Planet Hulk version Retool of the Hulk Classics War Hulk figure from ToyBiz with a new head and accessories	Tail
Fin Fang Foom	2008	Hulk		Savage Grey	Left leg
Fin Fang Foom	2008	Hulk		Classic green variant	Left leg
Fin Fang Foom	2008	She-Hulk		First appearance (Savage She-Hulk) version	Head and neck
Fin Fang Foom	2008	Skaar			Upper torso
Fin Fang Foom	2008	Wendigo		Some figures had manufacturing errors where the BAF piece was missing	Right wing and arm
Terrax	2012	Steve Rogers	Normal shield, guns	S.H.I.E.L.D. version	Lower torso
Terrax	2012	Steve Rogers	clear shield, guns	Variant	Lower torso
Terrax	2012	Iron Man		Extremis Armor (Model 29)	Right leg
Terrax	2012	Iron Man		Stealth Armor (Model 7) version variant	Right leg
Terrax	2012	Ghost Rider (Danny Ketch)		Blue flames	Left and Right Arms
Terrax	2012	Ghost Rider (Danny Ketch)		Orange flame variant	Left and Right Arms
Terrax	2012	Constrictor			Upper torso
Terrax	2012	Thor	Hammer	Oliver Coipel version	
Terrax	2012	Klaw			Left leg
Terrax	2012	Hope Summers	Gun		Head and axe
Arnim Zola	2012	Captain America (Bucky Barnes)	Shield, knife and gun		Right leg
Arnim Zola	2012	Thunderball	Ball and chain	Running change to Piledriver	Head (yellow eye) and control
Arnim Zola	2012	Piledriver	Ball and chain	Running change from Thunderball	Head (red eye) and control (Red Skull variant)
Arnim Zola	2012	Madame Masque	Gun	Running change to Madame Hydra	torso
Arnim Zola	2012	Madame Hydra (Viper)	Gun	Running change to Madame Masque	Torso (variant Red Skull)
Arnim Zola	2012	Drax the Destroyer	2 knives		Left leg
Arnim Zola	2012	Spider-Man		Big Time version	
Arnim Zola	2012	Spider-Man		Future Foundation variant	
Arnim Zola	2012	Fantomex	2 guns	Uncanny X-Force version	Right arm
Arnim Zola	2012	Dark Wolverine (Daken)		Masked; Dark Avengers version	Left arm
Arnim Zola	2012	Dark Wolverine (Daken)		Unmasked variant	Left arm
Iron Monger	2013	Iron Man		Bleeding Edge (Model 37) Armor version	Right leg
Iron Monger	2013	Iron Patriot (Norman Osborn)			Chest and torso
Iron Monger	2013	Iron Man	Alternate head	Model 2 "Hornhead" armor (Re-release of the classic 2-pack Iron Man Model 4 armor with alternate Model 2 head)	Left leg
Iron Monger	2013	Ultron		Repaint of the (Non-Legends) Iron Man: The Armored Avenger Titanium Man with a new head	Head
Iron Monger	2013	Iron Patriot (James Rhodes)	Shoulder-mounted machine gun	Iron Man 3 version	Left arm
Iron Monger	2013	Iron Man		Iron Man 3 (Mark 42) version	Right arm
Hit-Monkey	2013	Noh-Varr	2 pistols	Protector version	head and guns
Hit-Monkey	2013	Red She-Hulk	Sword		Torso and legs
Hit-Monkey	2013	Hyperion			Arms and pistols
Hit-Monkey	2013	Ultimate Captain America	Shield		
Hit-Monkey	2013	Wolverine		X-Force version Repaint of the SDCC exclusive X-Force box set Wolverine	
Hit-Monkey	2013	Archangel	Attachable wings	Pink and blue version Repaint of the SDDC exclusive X-Force box set Archangel	
Rocket Raccoon	2013	Jean Grey		Jim Lee version	Torso, legs and tail
Rocket Raccoon	2013	Black Panther		Classic version	Arms
Rocket Raccoon	2013	Wrecker	Crowbar		Head and gun
Rocket Raccoon	2013	Scarlet Spider (Kaine Parker)			
Rocket Raccoon	2013	Hawkeye	Bow	Marvel NOW! version	
Mandroid	2014	Captain America	Shield	Marvel NOW! version	Head
Mandroid	2014	Red Skull	Cosmic Cube, pistols		Left arm
Mandroid	2014	Hydra Soldier	Guns	Modern version	Left arm
Mandroid	2014	Baron Helmut Zemo	Sword, guns	Modern version	Right arm
Mandroid	2014	A.I.M. Soldier	Guns		Right arm
Mandroid	2014	Black Widow	Rifle and alternate head & hands	Captain America: The Winter Soldier version	Torso
Mandroid	2014	Captain America	Stealth shield and alternate head & hands	Captain America: The Winter Soldier stealth suit version	Right Leg
Mandroid	2014	Winter Soldier	Rifle and alternate head	Captain America: The Winter Soldier version	Left leg
Mandroid	2014	Captain America	World War II Shield and pistol	Captain America: The First Avenger version Re-released (Non-Legends) figure from Hasbro's Walmart-exclusive movie line	
Ultimate Green Goblin	2014	Spider-Man	Alternate hands	The Amazing Spider-Man 2 version	Right arm
Ultimate Green Goblin	2014	Electro	Alternate head and hands	The Amazing Spider-Man 2 version	Left arm
Ultimate Green Goblin	2014	Superior Spider-Man	Alternate hands	Doctor Octopus as Spider-Man	Right leg
Ultimate Green Goblin	2014	Carnage	Tendrils	Classic version	Head
Ultimate Green Goblin	2014	Toxin (Eddie Brock)	Tendrils		Head
Ultimate Green Goblin	2014	Black Cat	Whip	Classic version	Torso
Ultimate Green Goblin	2014	Spider-Girl (Anya Corazon)			Torso
Ultimate Green Goblin	2014	Ultimate Beetle	Wings	Ultimate Spider-Man (video game) version	Left leg
Ultimate Green Goblin	2014	Boomerang	4 boomerangs	The Superior Foes of Spider-Man version	Left leg
Groot	2014	Gamora	Sword	Guardians of the Galaxy version	Right leg
Groot	2014	Rocket	Laser cannon and Hadron enforcer	Guardians of the Galaxy version	Head and chest
Groot	2014	Star-Lord	Alternate helmeted head, quad blasters, headphones, Sony Walkman and the Orb	Guardians of the Galaxy version	Left arm
Groot	2014	Drax	Knives	Guardians of the Galaxy version	Abdomen
Groot	2014	Nova (Richard Rider)		Annihilation version	Right arm
Groot	2014	Iron Man		Deep-Space armor (Model 45) version	Left Leg
Odin/King Thor (Allfather)	2015	Captain Marvel (Carol Danvers)	Alternate head and energy burst		King Thor head, cape and axe
Odin/King Thor (Allfather)	2015	Machine Man	Interchangeable arms		King Thor arms
Odin/King Thor (Allfather)	2015	Scarlet Witch	Hex blasts	Classic version	Odin head, cape and staff
Odin/King Thor (Allfather)	2015	Thor	Mjolnir and sword	Marvel NOW! version	Right leg
Odin/King Thor (Allfather)	2015	Sentry		New Avengers version	Odin arms
Odin/King Thor (Allfather)	2015	Hawkeye	Bow	Heroic Age version	Torso
Odin/King Thor (Allfather)	2015	Iron Fist	Alternate hands	New Avengers white suit version	Left leg
Hobgoblin (Phil Urich)	2015	Anti-Venom			Right leg
Hobgoblin (Phil Urich)	2015	Daredevil	Billy clubs	Red costume version	Left arm and pumpkin bomb
Hobgoblin (Phil Urich)	2015	Spider-Girl (Mayday Parker)			Head and wings
Hobgoblin (Phil Urich)	2015	Spider-Man	Alternate head, hands and pizza slice	Classic version	Left leg
Hobgoblin (Phil Urich)	2015	Spider-Man 2099	Web cape	Classic version	Right arm and sword
Hobgoblin (Phil Urich)	2015	Ultimate Spider-Woman			Torso
Thanos (Infinity)	2015	Captain America	Alternate head and hands, shield	Avengers: Age of Ultron version Retool of the Mandroid wave Captain America	Right leg
Thanos (Infinity)	2015	Iron Man	Alternate open face plate head	Avengers: Age of Ultron (Mark 43) version Repaint of the Iron Monger series Iron Man (Mark 42)	Left leg
Thanos (Infinity)	2015	Hulk		Avengers: Age of Ultron version	Right arm
Thanos (Infinity)	2015	Batroc			Torso
Thanos (Infinity)	2015	Hellcat	Baton		Left arm and head
Thanos (Infinity)	2015	Spider-Woman (Jessica Drew)	2 sets of removable armpit wings	Classic version	Left arm and head
Hulkbuster (Avengers: Age of Ultron)	2015	Doctor Strange	Hex blasts	New Avengers version	Left leg
Hulkbuster (Avengers: Age of Ultron)	2015	Blizzard		Classic version	Upper torso
Hulkbuster (Avengers: Age of Ultron)	2015	Vision	Cape	Avengers A.I. version	Lower torso
Hulkbuster (Avengers: Age of Ultron)	2015	Iron Man		Marvel NOW! (Model 49) version Repaint of the (Non-Legends) Iron Man Mark IV From Hasbro's Walmart-exclusive Iron Man 2 Line	Right leg
Hulkbuster (Avengers: Age of Ultron)	2015	War Machine	Alternate unmasked head and shoulder-mounted machine gun	Avengers: Age of Ultron (Mark 2) version Repaint of the Iron Monger wave MCU Iron Patriot	Head
Hulkbuster (Avengers: Age of Ultron)	2015	Thundra	Wrecking ball	Classic version	Left arm
Hulkbuster (Avengers: Age of Ultron)	2015	Valkyrie	Sword	Secret Avengers version	Right arm
Ultron Prime (Avengers: Age of Ultron)	2015	Ant-Man	Ant, Ant-Man and Yellowjacket mini-figures	Ant-Man version	Head
Ultron Prime (Avengers: Age of Ultron)	2015	Wasp	Wings	Modern version	Torso
Ultron Prime (Avengers: Age of Ultron)	2015	Grim Reaper		Classic version	Left leg
Ultron Prime (Avengers: Age of Ultron)	2015	Tiger Shark		Classic version	Right arm
Ultron Prime (Avengers: Age of Ultron)	2015	Giant-Man (Hank Pym)		Avengers Academy version	Right leg
Ultron Prime (Avengers: Age of Ultron)	2015	Bulldozer		Classic version	Left arm
Rhino	2015	Ghost Rider (Johnny Blaze)		Classic version	Left leg
Rhino	2015	Scarlet Spider (Ben Reilly)	Alternate hands	Scarlet Spider	Masked head and screaming head
Rhino	2015	Chameleon	Alternate J. Jonah Jameson and Hammerhead heads, tommy gun and machine gun	Classic version	Left arm
Rhino	2015	Misty Knight	Gun		Torso
Rhino	2015	White Tiger (Ava Ayala)			Torso
Rhino	2015	Kraven the Hunter	Spear	Modern version	Right leg
Rhino	2015	Superior Venom	Tendrils		Right arm
Absorbing Man	2016	Spider-Man (Ben Reilly)	Alternate hands and Spider-Carnage head		Left and right arms (steel and regular)
Absorbing Man	2016	Venom	Closed fists, alternate head with open mouth and tongue	Todd McFarlane version	Two heads
Absorbing Man	2016	Spider-Gwen	Alternate unmasked head		Wrecking ball
Absorbing Man	2016	Jack O'Lantern	Sickle, flaming broomstick, grenade	Crime Master's version	Left leg
Absorbing Man	2016	Morbius, the Living Vampire	Cape		Left and right arms (Stone and Wood)
Absorbing Man	2016	Beetle (Janice Lincoln)	Wings	The Superior Foes of Spider-Man version	Right leg
Absorbing Man	2016	Speed Demon	Alternate flat hands, Silvermane head on remote controlled car	The Superior Foes of Spider-Man version	Torso
Red Onslaught	2016	Sharon Carter	S.H.I.E.L.D. gun		Right leg
Red Onslaught	2016	Captain America	Shield, alternate hands and Capwolf head	Classic version	Cape
Red Onslaught	2016	Cottonmouth (Burchell Clemens)			Right arm
Red Onslaught	2016	Mockingbird	Baton		Torso
Red Onslaught	2016	Taskmaster	Shield, sword and alternate UDON head with black hood	Ultimate Spider-Man (TV series) version	Head
Red Onslaught	2016	Scourge of the Underworld (Dennis Dunphy)	Handgun, shotgun and knife		Left leg
Red Onslaught	2016	Whirlwind	Two removable saw blades		Left arm
Giant-Man (Captain America: Civil War)	2016	Captain America	Shield	Captain America: Civil War version Redeco of the Thanos wave Captain America	Head
Giant-Man (Captain America: Civil War)	2016	Iron Man	Additional Pair of Open-Palmed Hands, 2 Blast Effects	Captain America: Civil War (Mark 46) version	Right arm
Giant-Man (Captain America: Civil War)	2016	Black Panther	Alternate unmasked head	Captain America: Civil War version	Left leg
Giant-Man (Captain America: Civil War)	2016	Nuke	Cyborg head, dagger, gun and vest		Torso
Giant-Man (Captain America: Civil War)	2016	Nick Fury	Pistol and alternate S.H.I.E.L.D. agent and Dirk Anger heads	Classic version	Left arm
Giant-Man (Captain America: Civil War)	2016	Red Guardian	Shield		Right leg
Space Knight Venom	2016	Hobgoblin	Glider and alternate head	Classic version	Head
Space Knight Venom	2016	Spider-Man (Miles Morales)	Alternate head and hands		Right arm
Space Knight Venom	2016	Ultimate Spider-Man	Alternate head and hands		Left arm
Space Knight Venom	2016	Spider-Girl (Ashley Barton)		Old Man Logan version	Torso
Space Knight Venom	2016	Silk	Alternate unmasked head and scarf		Left leg
Space Knight Venom	2016	Electro	Alternate head	Modern version	Right leg
Abomination	2016	Scarlet Witch	Energy blasts	Captain America: Civil War version	Head
Abomination	2016	Captain Britain		Modern version	Left arm
Abomination	2016	Eel (Edward Lavell)	Alternate hands		Torso
Abomination	2016	Red Skull	Alternate head	Avengers Assemble Iron Skull version The head is reused from the Mandroid Wave Red Skull figure, and the body is a repaint of the Iron Monger wave Iron Man Mark 42 figure.	Left leg
Abomination	2016	Captain America	Shield throwing hand	Secret War version	Right arm
Abomination	2016	Wonder Man	Alternate hands and energy blasts		Right leg
Juggernaut	2016	Wolverine	Regular fists	Brown costume version	Head
Juggernaut	2016	Kitty Pryde and Lockheed		All-New X-Men version	Right arm and Onslaught head for Red Onslaught BAF
Juggernaut	2016	Iceman		Modern version	Left arm
Juggernaut	2016	Phoenix (Jean Grey)		Green costume version	Upper torso
Juggernaut	2016	Cable	2 large guns and ammo belt	Avengers: X-Sanction version	Lower torso
Juggernaut	2016	Rogue	Ungloved hand	Jim Lee version	Left leg
Juggernaut	2016	Havok	Energy blasts	Modern version	Right leg
Juggernaut	2016	Deadpool	2 katanas, 2 handguns, knife, rail gun, shotgun, taco and alternate unmasked head	Modern version	
Dormammu (Repaint of Book of the Vishanti figure)	2016	Doctor Strange	Spell and alternate spell casting hands	Doctor Strange version	Left leg
Dormammu (Repaint of Book of the Vishanti figure)	2016	Karl Mordo	Staff	Doctor Strange version	Right leg and flaming skulls
Dormammu (Repaint of Book of the Vishanti figure)	2016	Nico Minoru	Staff of One and alternate magic infused arm		Lower torso
Dormammu (Repaint of Book of the Vishanti figure)	2016	Iron Fist	Flaming fists, bandaged fists and flame blasts	The Immortal Iron Fist version	Shoulder pads and chest cap
Dormammu (Repaint of Book of the Vishanti figure)	2016	Enchantress	Magic effects	Repaint of The Raft SDCC box set Enchantress	Upper torso
Dormammu (Repaint of Book of the Vishanti figure)	2016	Astral Doctor Strange		Doctor Strange version 'Foggy white' repaint, no cape	Head
Dormammu (Repaint of Book of the Vishanti figure)	2016	Doctor Strange	Magic effects	Illuminati version Retool of the Hulkbuster wave Doctor Strange with a new cape	Right Arm
Dormammu (Repaint of Book of the Vishanti figure)	2016	Brother Voodoo	Staff	Repaint of Book of the Vishanti figure	Left arm
Sandman	January 2017	Ms. Marvel (Kamala Khan)	Alternate enlarged hands		Torso
Sandman	January 2017	Spider-Man 2099		Parker Industries version	Right arm
Sandman	January 2017	Green Goblin	Goblin Glider and pumpkin bomb	Modern version	Head
Sandman	January 2017	Jackal		Classic version	Right leg
Sandman	January 2017	Spider-Man	Wall crawling hands	Symbiote version Repaint of the Hobgoblin wave Spider-Man	Hand add-ons
Sandman	January 2017	Spider-UK			Left arm
Sandman	January 2017	Shocker	Vibration blast effects	Modern version	Left leg
Titus	February 2017	Star-Lord	Quad blasters and alternate helmeted head	Guardians of the Galaxy Vol. 2 version	
Titus	February 2017	Drax	Gun and knives	Guardians of the Galaxy Vol. 2 version	Left arm
Titus	February 2017	Yondu	Alternate head and sonic arrow	Guardians of the Galaxy Vol. 2 version	Right arm
Titus	February 2017	Nova (Sam Alexander) and Phlish			Torso
Titus	February 2017	Darkhawk			Head
Titus	February 2017	Angela	Sword and twin axes	Marvel NOW! version	Right leg
Titus	February 2017	Major Victory	Captain America shield	Comic version	Left leg
Warlock (New Mutants)	February 2017	Colossus	Alternate head	Simone Bianchi version	Head and alternate saw hand
Warlock (New Mutants)	February 2017	Cyclops		Jim Lee version	Left leg
Warlock (New Mutants)	February 2017	Shatterstar	Swords		Right arm
Warlock (New Mutants)	February 2017	Dazzler	Light effect and microphone	Classic disco version	Left arm
Warlock (New Mutants)	February 2017	Polaris	Magnetism effects		Right leg
Warlock (New Mutants)	February 2017	Sunfire	Fire effects	Classic version	Torso
Warlock (New Mutants)	February 2017	Old Man Logan			
Vulture (Spider-Man: Homecoming)	May/June 2017	Beetle		Mark 2 version	Turbine
Vulture (Spider-Man: Homecoming)	May/June 2017	Moon Knight	Interchangeable hands, staff/batons, crescent moon weapons	Modern armored version	Wing piece
Vulture (Spider-Man: Homecoming)	May/June 2017	Spider-Man	Armpit web wings, interchangeable head and hands	Spider-Man: Homecoming version Retool of the Spider-Man figure from the Captain America: Civil War box set	Wing piece
Vulture (Spider-Man: Homecoming)	May/June 2017	Spider-Man	Hood, lowered hood and interchangeable hands	Spider-Man: Homecoming Proto-Suit version	Wing piece
Vulture (Spider-Man: Homecoming)	May/June 2017	Cosmic Spider-Man	Alternate Captain Universe and bearded Peter Parker heads		Wing piece
Vulture (Spider-Man: Homecoming)	May/June 2017	Tombstone			Turbine
Vulture (Spider-Man: Homecoming)	May/June 2017	Vulture		Spider-Man: Homecoming version	Display base for wings
Mantis (Guardians of the Galaxy Vol. 2)	July/August 2017	Rocket	Baby Groot in Ravager suit, 2 guns and alternate head	Guardians of the Galaxy Vol. 2 version Blue suit, new sculpt	Torso
Mantis (Guardians of the Galaxy Vol. 2)	July/August 2017	Gamora	2 swords and gun	Guardians of the Galaxy Vol. 2 version	Right leg
Mantis (Guardians of the Galaxy Vol. 2)	July/August 2017	Nebula	Blaster and alternate arm	Guardians of the Galaxy Vol. 2 version	Left leg
Mantis (Guardians of the Galaxy Vol. 2)	July/August 2017	Star-Lord	Scarf, 2 blasters and Walkman	Guardians of the Galaxy Vol. 2 version	Right arm
Mantis (Guardians of the Galaxy Vol. 2)	July/August 2017	Death's Head II	Alternate hand		
Mantis (Guardians of the Galaxy Vol. 2)	July/August 2017	Ex Nihilo			Left arm
Mantis (Guardians of the Galaxy Vol. 2)	July/August 2017	Adam Warlock	Alternate Magus head and 2 energy effect pieces		Head
Man-Thing	August 2017	Jessica Jones		Jessica Jones version	Torso
Man-Thing	August 2017	Punisher	Pistol and assault rifle	Daredevil version	Left arm
Man-Thing	August 2017	Daredevil	Batons and alternate hands	Daredevil version	Head
Man-Thing	August 2017	Elektra	2 sais and alternate head	Daredevil version	Left leg
Man-Thing	August 2017	Bullseye	Pistol, dagger, throwing knives and alternate head and hands	Marvel Knights version	Right arm
Man-Thing	August 2017	Blade	Katana, scabbard and alternate head	Marvel MAX version	Right leg
Gladiator Hulk (Thor: Ragnarok)	August 2017	Thor	Twin swords	Thor: Ragnarok version	Head and helmet
Gladiator Hulk (Thor: Ragnarok)	August 2017	Hela	Sword and alternate unmasked head	Thor: Ragnarok version	Right arm and axe
Gladiator Hulk (Thor: Ragnarok)	August 2017	Loki	Removable headdress	Thor: Ragnarok version	Right leg
Gladiator Hulk (Thor: Ragnarok)	August 2017	Thor (Jane Foster)	Mjolnir	Re-released from the SDCC Mighty Thor box set with repainted Mjolnir hammer	Left leg
Gladiator Hulk (Thor: Ragnarok)	August 2017	Odinson	Jarnbjorn axe	Retooled from the SDCC Mighty Thor box set figure	Torso
Gladiator Hulk (Thor: Ragnarok)	August 2017	Ares	Sword, axe and dagger	Retool of the Walmart-exclusive BAF with new paint and legs	Left arm and hammer
Okoye (Black Panther)	January 2018	Black Panther	Alternate unmasked head and hands	Black Panther version	Head
Okoye (Black Panther)	January 2018	Nakia	Ring blades	Black Panther version	Torso and spear
Okoye (Black Panther)	January 2018	Erik Killmonger	Sword, spear and alternate hands	Black Panther vibranium suit version	Left leg
Okoye (Black Panther)	January 2018	Black Bolt	Alternate head	Illuminati version Repaint of the Thanos Imperative set figure with a new head	Right leg
Okoye (Black Panther)	January 2018	Namor	Trident and alternate head	Classic version	Arms
Okoye (Black Panther)	January 2018	Iron Man	Alternate unmasked head, attachable cannon and blast effects	All-New, All-Different Marvel Model-Prime (Model 51) version	
Lizard	February 2018				
Lizard	February 2018	Spider-Punk	Guitar and alternate hands		Right arm
Lizard	February 2018	Gwenpool	Smartphone, alternate head and hands and twin katanas		Tail
Lizard	February 2018	Mysterio	Smoke effects	1960's version	Left leg
Lizard	February 2018	Spider-Woman (Jessica Drew)		All-New, All-Different Marvel version	Torso
Lizard	February 2018	Spider-Man Noir	Twin handguns		Left arm
Lizard	February 2018	Prowler	Removable cape		Right leg
Lizard	February 2018	Lasher	Tendrils	Venom: Separation Anxiety version	Head
Thanos (Avengers: Infinity War)	March 2018	Iron Man	Alternate hands and blast effects	Avengers: Infinity War (Mark 50) version	
Thanos (Avengers: Infinity War)	March 2018	Captain America	Alternate hands and Wakandan shield	Avengers: Infinity War version	Head
Thanos (Avengers: Infinity War)	March 2018	Iron Spider		Avengers: Infinity War version	Left leg
Thanos (Avengers: Infinity War)	March 2018	Proxima Midnight	Spear	Avengers: Infinity War version	Torso
Thanos (Avengers: Infinity War)	March 2018	Songbird	Sonic energy wings		Right arm
Thanos (Avengers: Infinity War)	March 2018	King Cobra			Left arm and Infinity Gauntlet
Thanos (Avengers: Infinity War)	March 2018	Taskmaster	Sword, pistol and shield	Classic version	Right leg
Sasquatch	May 2018	Deadpool	Twin katanas	90s X-Force version	
Sasquatch	May 2018	Deadpool	Rifle, handgun and twin katanas	Uncanny X-Force version Rerelease of the HASCON exclusive	Head
Sasquatch	May 2018	Domino	2 guns		Right arm
Sasquatch	May 2018	Cable	Rifle, pistol and revolver	Rob Liefeld version	Left leg
Sasquatch	May 2018	X-23		X-Force version	Torso
Sasquatch	May 2018	Deathlok	Gun		Left arm
Sasquatch	May 2018	Paladin	Twin pistols		Right leg
Cull Obsidian (Avengers: Infinity War)	June 2018	Thor	Stormbreaker and lightning effect	Avengers: Infinity War version	Left arm
Cull Obsidian (Avengers: Infinity War)	June 2018	Black Widow	Connecting batons, tasers and alternate hands	Avengers: Infinity War version	Torso
Cull Obsidian (Avengers: Infinity War)	June 2018	Ant-Man	Alternate helmeted head	Ant-Man and the Wasp version	Left leg
Cull Obsidian (Avengers: Infinity War)	June 2018	Hope van Dyne	Alternate unmasked head, alternate hands and wingless backpack	Ant-Man and the Wasp version	Head
Cull Obsidian (Avengers: Infinity War)	June 2018	Black Knight (Dane Whitman)	Ebony Blade and alternate Avengers and Sir Percy heads	The Incredible Hulk Weekly version	Right leg
Cull Obsidian (Avengers: Infinity War)	June 2018	Malekith the Accursed	Sword	Repaint of the Malekith figure from the SDCC Battle for Asgard box set	Right arm and hammer
Apocalypse	Summer 2018	Wolverine	Alternate hands	Jim Lee version Redeco of the Juggernaut wave Wolverine with a new head and shoulder pads	Arm tubes
Apocalypse	Summer 2018	Storm	Lightning effects	80s punk mohawk version	Torso
Apocalypse	Summer 2018	Magneto	Alternate unmasked head, magnetic energy effects and alternate hands	All-New, All-Different Marvel version	Right arm
Apocalypse	Summer 2018	Psylocke	Psychic katana, psychic knife and butterfly effect piece	Jim Lee version	Left leg
Apocalypse	Summer 2018	Multiple Man	Two alternate heads	90s X-Factor version	Right leg
Apocalypse	Summer 2018	Sabretooth		Jim Lee version	Left arm
Apocalypse	Summer 2018	Gladiator		Repaint of the Gladiator figure from the Thanos Imperative box set	Head
SP//dr	2018	Spider-Man		House of M version	Right leg
SP//dr	2018	Cloak			Head
SP//dr	2018	Dagger	Light dagger effect		Torso
SP//dr	2018	Daredevil	Grappling hook billy club and alternate hands	All-New, All-Different Marvel version	Right arm
SP//dr	2018	Doctor Octopus	Tentacles		
SP//dr	2018	Elektra	Twin sai		Left leg
SP//dr	2018	Scarlet Spider (Kaine Parker)	Alternate unmasked head and spiked fists		Left arm
Monster Venom	2018	Venom	Alternate unmasked head	Retool of the Absorbing Man wave Venom with new accessories	Right leg
Monster Venom	2018	Carnage	Axe hand, alternate unmasked head and hands	Retool of the Ultimate Green Goblin wave Carnage with new accessories	Head
Monster Venom	2018	Scream		Venom: Separation Anxiety version	Right arm
Monster Venom	2018	Typhoid Mary	Katana and flame effect		Left leg
Monster Venom	2018	Poison			Left arm
Monster Venom	2018	Spider-Ham	Alternate Pork Grind head		Torso
Sauron	2018	Deadpool	Twin katanas and black rifle, alternate Madcap head and hat	X-Men uniform version	Tail
Sauron	2018	Deadpool	No katanas, grey rifles, Madcap head and hat, and female mask	Deadpool costume variant	Tail
Sauron	2018	Lady Deadpool	Headpool and twin katanas		Right leg
Sauron	2018	Deadpool	2 guns	Pantsless version	Head and torso
Sauron	2018	Omega Red	4 attachable tendrils		Left leg
Sauron	2018	Wolverine (Laura Kinney)	Alternate unmasked head	All-New Wolverine version	Left arm and wing
Sauron	2018	Bishop	Rifle	Jim Lee version	Right arm and wing
M'Baku (Black Panther)	January 2019	Black Panther	Alternate unmasked head	Black Panther original suit version Rerelease of the Giant-Man wave Black Panther figure with a new unmasked head sculpt	Left arm
M'Baku (Black Panther)	January 2019	Ulysses Klaue	Alternate sonic cannon arm and pistol	Black Panther version	Torso
M'Baku (Black Panther)	January 2019	T'Chaka		Black Panther version	Right leg
M'Baku (Black Panther)	January 2019	Ayo	2 alternate Dora Milaje member heads, vibranium spear, dagger and ring blades	Black Panther version	Left leg
M'Baku (Black Panther)	January 2019	Black Panther	Alternate unmasked head and hands	Avengers: Infinity War glowing version Repaint of the Okoye wave Black Panther figure	Right arm
M'Baku (Black Panther)	January 2019	Erik Killmonger	Assault rifle, pistol and tribal mask	Black Panther tactical suit version	Head and staff
Kree Sentry	January 2019	Carol Danvers	Alternate hands and helmeted head	Captain Marvel version	
Kree Sentry	January 2019	Yon-Rogg	Blaster pistol	Captain Marvel version	Torso
Kree Sentry	January 2019	Talos		Captain Marvel version	Left leg
Kree Sentry	January 2019	Nick Fury and Goose	Pistol	Captain Marvel 1990s version, shackled Goose	Right arm
Kree Sentry	January 2019	Carol Danvers and Goose		Captain Marvel bomber jacket version	Left arm
Kree Sentry	January 2019	Captain Marvel (Genis-Vell)	Blaster pistol	Kree military version	Right leg
Kree Sentry	January 2019	Grey Gargoyle			Head
Kingpin	2019	Spider-Man	Alternate hands	Modern Symbiote version	Heads
Kingpin	2019	Red Goblin	Alternate symbiote mask and attachable tendrils		Right leg
Kingpin	2019	Silver Sable	Two guns		Left arm
Kingpin	2019	Black Cat	Whip	Crime lord version	Right arm and cane
Kingpin	2019	Night Thrasher	Skateboard, attachable backpack and Eskrima sticks		Left leg
Kingpin	2019	Spider-Man		Six-armed version	
Kingpin	2019	Puma			Torso
Armored Thanos (Avengers: Endgame)	April 2019	Captain America	Shield	Avengers: Endgame Quantum Realm suit version	
Armored Thanos (Avengers: Endgame)	April 2019	Ronin (Clint Barton)	Katana, wakizashi and alternate shuriken-throwing hand	Avengers: Endgame version	Left arm
Armored Thanos (Avengers: Endgame)	April 2019	Ebony Maw		Avengers: Infinity War version	Left leg
Armored Thanos (Avengers: Endgame)	April 2019	Living Laser	2 energy effect pieces	Modern version	Torso
Armored Thanos (Avengers: Endgame)	April 2019	Nighthawk		Defenders version	Right arm and sword
Armored Thanos (Avengers: Endgame)	April 2019	Citizen V (Helmut Zemo)	Sword	Thunderbolts version	Right leg
Armored Thanos (Avengers: Endgame)	April 2019	Hercules	Sword, mace and alternate hands	Modern version	Head
Caliban	2019	Beast	Alternate hands	Jim Lee version	Head
Caliban	2019	Skullbuster	Gun and alternate Murray Reese head		Right arm
Caliban	2019	Blink	Energy daggers, teleport effect		Left leg
Caliban	2019	Jubilee	Alternate head	Jim Lee version, repaint of 2013 BAF	Torso
Caliban	2019	Forge	Rifle, pistol	Jim Lee version	Left arm
Caliban	2019	Wolverine	Unmasked head	Weapon X version	Right leg
Caliban	2019	Gambit	Staff, energized playing card, alternate hand	Jim Lee version	
Smart Hulk (Avengers: Endgame)	June 2019	War Machine	Shoulder cannon and two attachable forearm guns	Avengers: Endgame (Mark 6) version	
Smart Hulk (Avengers: Endgame)	June 2019	Rescue	Alternate thrusters	Avengers: Endgame version	Torso
Smart Hulk (Avengers: Endgame)	June 2019	Shuri	Vibranium gauntlets	Black Panther version	Left leg
Smart Hulk (Avengers: Endgame)	June 2019	Beta Ray Bill	Stormbreaker hammer	Oliver Coipel version	Heads
Smart Hulk (Avengers: Endgame)	June 2019	Loki	Sword	Classic version	Right leg
Smart Hulk (Avengers: Endgame)	June 2019	Union Jack	Knife and pistol		Right arm
Smart Hulk (Avengers: Endgame)	June 2019	Rock Python			Left arm
Molten Man (Spider-Man: Far From Home)	July 2019	Spider-Man	Alternate hands	Spider-Man: Far From Home version	
Molten Man (Spider-Man: Far From Home)	July 2019	Mysterio	Alternate hands	Spider-Man: Far From Home version	Left leg
Molten Man (Spider-Man: Far From Home)	July 2019	Spider-Man	Alternate head and hands	Spider-Man: Far From Home stealth suit version	Left arm
Molten Man (Spider-Man: Far From Home)	July 2019	Scorpion	13-inch bendable tail	Classic version	Right leg
Molten Man (Spider-Man: Far From Home)	July 2019	Spider-Woman (Julia Carpenter)	Psi-web effect piece with alternate hand		Torso
Molten Man (Spider-Man: Far From Home)	July 2019	Hydro-Man	Two water effects pieces for feet		Head
Molten Man (Spider-Man: Far From Home)	July 2019	Doppelganger		Maximum Carnage version	Right arm and girder
Wendigo	August 2019	Wolverine		Uncanny X-Force version Retool and repaint of the Juggernaut wave Wolverine with new boots and gloves	Head
Wendigo	August 2019	Nightcrawler	Cutlass, alternate hand and two alternate heads	Classic version	Left arm
Wendigo	August 2019	Mr. Sinister		Classic version	Right arm
Wendigo	August 2019	Cannonball		Rob Liefeld version	Left leg
Wendigo	August 2019	Boom-Boom	Alternate head and explosion effect piece	Rob Liefeld version	Right leg
Wendigo	August 2019	Guardian		Classic version	Torso and tail
Fat Thor (Avengers: Endgame)	Fall 2019	Iron Man	Power Gauntlet for the Professor Hulk BAF, alternate hands and two blast effect pieces	Avengers: Endgame Mark 85 version	Right arm and alternate hand
Fat Thor (Avengers: Endgame)	Fall 2019	Captain America	Shield	Avengers: Endgame 2012 disguise version Head swap of the Captain America figure from the Walmart-exclusive (Non-Legends) Avengers line	Left arm
Fat Thor (Avengers: Endgame)	Fall 2019	Heimdall	Bifrost sword	Thor: Ragnarok version	Right leg
Fat Thor (Avengers: Endgame)	Fall 2019	Iron Patriot	Two shoulder mounted cannons and two missile launchers	Avengers: Endgame version Retool and redeco of the Professor Hulk wave War Machine	Heads
Fat Thor (Avengers: Endgame)	Fall 2019	Valkyrie	Dragonfang sword and scabbard	Avengers: Endgame version	Right leg
Fat Thor (Avengers: Endgame)	Fall 2019	Vision		Captain America: Civil War phasing version Translucent repaint of the Infinity War two-pack Vision	Torso and Stormbreaker axe
Super-Skrull	January 2020	She-Hulk		Gray version	Invisible left arm and normal left arm
Super-Skrull	January 2020	Doctor Doom	Alternate classic head, alternate hands and pistol		Left leg
Super-Skrull	January 2020	Mister Fantastic	Alternate stretched hands	Fresh Start version Retool of the Walgreens exclusive Mister Fantastic with a new head, feet and accessories	Right leg
Super-Skrull	January 2020	Invisible Woman	Force field effect piece	Fresh Start version Retool of the Walgreens exclusive with a new head, feet and accessories	Torso
Super-Skrull	January 2020	The Thing		Fresh Start version Retool of the Walgreens exclusive Thing with a new head and belt	Heads
Super-Skrull	January 2020	Human Torch	Alternate flaming hands and three flame effect pieces	Fresh Start version	Normal right arm and rock right arm
Demogoblin	January 2020	Spider-Man	Web net	Spider-Man (2018 video game) Velocity Suit version	Right leg
Demogoblin	January 2020	Shang-Chi	2 nunchaku and 8 alternate hands	Classic version	Torso
Demogoblin	January 2020	Vulture	Alternate Blackie Drago head	Classic version	Head
Demogoblin	January 2020	Spider-Man	Web effect piece	Ends of the Earth armor version	Left leg
Demogoblin	January 2020	Superior Octopus			Arms
Demogoblin	January 2020	White Rabbit	Umbrella		Glider and flight stand
Crimson Dynamo (Gennady Gavrilov)	March 2020	Black Widow (Natasha Romanoff)	2 batons and alternate hands	Black Widow version	Left leg
Crimson Dynamo (Gennady Gavrilov)	March 2020	Yelena Belova	Twin pistols and alternate hands	Black Widow version	Torso and shoulder armor
Crimson Dynamo (Gennady Gavrilov)	March 2020	Taskmaster	Shield, sword, bow and arrow and 4 alternate hands	Black Widow version	
Crimson Dynamo (Gennady Gavrilov)	March 2020	Red Guardian	Shield	Black Widow version	Left arm
Crimson Dynamo (Gennady Gavrilov)	March 2020	Winter Soldier	Assault rifle and pistol		Head
Crimson Dynamo (Gennady Gavrilov)	March 2020	Spymaster	Pistol		Right leg
Crimson Dynamo (Gennady Gavrilov)	March 2020	Crossbones	4 guns	Classic version	Right arm
Abomination (Gamerverse)	May 2020	Iron Man	2 blast effect pieces	Avengers version	Right leg
Abomination (Gamerverse)	May 2020	Captain America	Shield	Avengers version	
Abomination (Gamerverse)	May 2020	Ms. Marvel (Kamala Khan)	Alternate enlarged hands	Avengers video game version Redeco and retool of the Sandman wave Ms. Marvel figure with new boots	Torso
Abomination (Gamerverse)	May 2020	Captain Marvel (Mar-Vell)			Left arm
Abomination (Gamerverse)	May 2020	The Leader			Left leg
Abomination (Gamerverse)	May 2020	Mach-1			Head
Abomination (Gamerverse)	May 2020	Rage			Right arm
Sugar Man	June 2020	Weapon X	Alternate left arm stub	Age of Apocalypse version	Left leg
Sugar Man	June 2020	X-Man		Age of Apocalypse version	Top arms
Sugar Man	June 2020	Morph		Age of Apocalypse version	Right leg
Sugar Man	June 2020	Wild Child	Chain	Age of Apocalypse version	Torso
Sugar Man	June 2020	Sunfire		Age of Apocalypse version	Bottom arms
Sugar Man	June 2020	Dark Beast	Alternate hands	Age of Apocalypse version	Hammer
Sugar Man	June 2020	Jean Grey		Age of Apocalypse version	Head
Strong Guy	August 2020	Deadpool	Katana, cutlass and antique pistol	Pirate version	Left leg
Strong Guy	August 2020	Deadpool	Twin katanas, pistol and rifle	Blue and yellow X-Men uniform version Repaint of the Sasquatch wave Deadpool with different accessories	Head
Strong Guy	August 2020	Sunspot	2 energy effect pieces	90s X-Force version	Torso
Strong Guy	August 2020	Warpath	2 alternate hands	90s X-Force version	Right leg
Strong Guy	August 2020	Black Tom Cassidy	Shillelagh		Back
Strong Guy	August 2020	Maverick	Gun		Left arm
Strong Guy	August 2020	Shiklah and Jeff the Baby Land Shark			Right arm
Venompool (Gamerverse)	Fall 2020	Venom	Alternate head and fists	Venom version	
Venompool (Gamerverse)	Fall 2020	Carnage	Alternate head and back tendril piece	Absolute Carnage version	Head
Venompool (Gamerverse)	Fall 2020	Spider-Man (Miles Morales)		Venomized Spider-Man: Maximum Venom version	Right arm and alternate fist
Venompool (Gamerverse)	Fall 2020	Gwenom		Venomized Spider-Man: Maximum Venom version	Torso and katanas
Venompool (Gamerverse)	Fall 2020	Morbius the Living Vampire		Midnight Sons version	Left arm and alternate fist
Venompool (Gamerverse)	Fall 2020	Phage	Alternate bladed arm	Venom: Separation Anxiety version	Legs
Joe Fixit (Gamerverse)	October 2020	Captain America	Shield, alternate unmasked head and alternate hands	Avengers video game stealth suit version Repaint of the Abomination wave Captain America with a new head	Left Arm
Joe Fixit (Gamerverse)	October 2020	Iron Man	Alternate hands and unmasked head	Avengers video game Atmosphere armor version Repaint of the Starboost armor Iron Man figure with a new alternate head	Right Arm
Joe Fixit (Gamerverse)	October 2020	Falcon	Wings and alternate hands	Captain America and the Falcon version	Left leg
Joe Fixit (Gamerverse)	October 2020	Kang the Conqueror	Blaster and 3 alternate hands		Right leg
Joe Fixit (Gamerverse)	October 2020	Thunderstrike	Thunderstrike mace and alternate hand		Head
Joe Fixit (Gamerverse)	October 2020	Jocasta	Alternate hands		Torso
Stilt-Man	January 2021	Spider-Man (Miles Morales)	Alternate unmasked head and hands	Spider-Man: Into the Spider-Verse version	Chest piece
Stilt-Man	January 2021	Peter B. Parker	Soda cup, alternate head and 4 alternate hands	Spider-Man: Into the Spider-Verse version	Head
Stilt-Man	January 2021	Prowler (Aaron Davis)		Spider-Man: Into the Spider-Verse version	Right arm, alternate hand and suitcase
Stilt-Man	January 2021	Spider-Gwen and Spider-Ham	Alternate unmasked head, hood and alternate hands	Spider-Man: Into the Spider-Verse version Retool of the Absorbing Man wave Spider-Gwen with a new chest, unmasked head and sculpted ballet slippers	Torso
Stilt-Man	January 2021	Frog-Man	Alternate hands		Pistol, left arm and alternate hand
Stilt-Man	January 2021	Hand Ninja	Ninjato, scabbard, 2 kamas and alternate hands		Leg extenders
Theta Sentinel (Powers of X)	February 2021	Magneto	4 alternate hands	House of X version	Heads
Theta Sentinel (Powers of X)	February 2021	Wolverine	Alternate bearded head	House of X version	
Theta Sentinel (Powers of X)	February 2021	Cyclops	Alternate head and optic blast effect	House of X version	Left arm
Theta Sentinel (Powers of X)	February 2021	Omega Sentinel	Alternate head and blaster arms	House of X version	Torso
Theta Sentinel (Powers of X)	February 2021	Moira MacTaggert	Removable lab coat, scarf, book, alternate arms and alternate head	House of X version	Left leg
Theta Sentinel (Powers of X)	February 2021	Professor X	Alternate psychic effect head and alternate hands	House of X version	Right arm
Theta Sentinel (Powers of X)	February 2021	Jean Grey	Krakoan flower	Classic Marvel Girl version	Right leg
Mr. Hyde	April/May 2021	Shang-Chi	Bo staff and 4 alternate hands	Shang-Chi and the Legend of the Ten Rings version	Left leg
Mr. Hyde	April/May 2021	The Mandarin	Hook sword and 4 alternate hands	Shang-Chi and the Legend of the Ten Rings version	Right arm and cane
Mr. Hyde	April/May 2021	Xialing	Rope dart and 5 alternate hands	Shang-Chi and the Legend of the Ten Rings version	Torso
Mr. Hyde	April/May 2021	Death Dealer	Alternate dagger-throwing hands	Shang-Chi and the Legend of the Ten Rings version	Left arm
Mr. Hyde	April/May 2021	Civil Warrior	Arc reactor shield	Marvel: Contest of Champions version Repaint of the Supreme Hydra figure with new accessories	Head
Mr. Hyde	April/May 2021	Iron Man	Alternate hologram head	Model 4 armor with Holographic AI head Repaint of the 80th anniversary Iron Man in classic colors with a new unmasked hologram head	Right leg
Captain America's Flight Gear	June 2021	Captain America (Sam Wilson)	Shield and jet pack	The Falcon and the Winter Soldier version	
Captain America's Flight Gear	June 2021	Winter Soldier	Alternate hands	The Falcon and the Winter Soldier version	Left wing piece
Captain America's Flight Gear	June 2021	Helmut Zemo	Hydra code book, pistol and alternate unmasked head	The Falcon and the Winter Soldier version	Left wing tip
Captain America's Flight Gear	June 2021	U.S. Agent	Alternate hands	The Falcon and the Winter Soldier version	Right wing tip
Captain America's Flight Gear	June 2021	Scarlet Witch	Alternate spell-casting hands and 2 magic effect pieces	WandaVision version	Right wing piece
Captain America's Flight Gear	June 2021	White Vision	Alternate hands	WandaVision version Redeco of the Infinity War two-pack Vision with a new head and cape	Inner wing pieces
Captain America's Flight Gear	June 2021	Loki		Loki version	Redwing, jet pack and flight stand
Xemnu	June 2021	God Emperor Doom	Pistol, Thanos' spine and 3 alternate hands	Secret Wars version Redeco and retool of the Super-Skrull wave Doctor Doom with a new torso and hands	
Xemnu	June 2021	Lady Deathstrike		Classic version	Torso
Xemnu	June 2021	Arcade	Walking stick and alternate Avengers Arena head		Left leg
Xemnu	June 2021	Dormammu	4 alternate hands and 2 flame effect pieces	80s version	Right arm
Xemnu	June 2021	A.I.M. Scientist Supreme	Hologram tablet	Secret Avengers version	Right arm
Xemnu	June 2021	Red Skull	Cosmic Cube, machine gun, alternate head and 4 alternate hands	Classic version	Head
Xemnu	June 2021	The Hood	Twin pistols, 2 magic bullet effect pieces and removable cloak		Right leg
Ursa Major	August 2021	Iron Man	Alternate hands and 2 blast effect pieces	Modular Armor version	
Ursa Major	August 2021	Ironheart	Alternate hands, 2 blast effect pieces, 2 smoke effect pieces and alternate unmasked head	Model 2 Armor version	Right leg
Ursa Major	August 2021	Ultron	Kirby Krackle effect piece and 3 alternate hands	Classic version	Right arm
Ursa Major	August 2021	Iron Man	Alternate hands, 2 blast effect pieces and alternate unmasked head	Stealth Armor version Redeco of the 80th Anniversary Iron Man	Left leg
Ursa Major	August 2021	Darkstar	4 alternate hands		Torso
Ursa Major	August 2021	Iron Man	Alternate hands and 2 blast effect pieces	Hologram Armor version Translucent recasting of the Giant-Man wave Civil War Iron Man	Head
Ursa Major	August 2021	Vault Guardsman	Blaster pistol and alternate hands		Left arm
Colossus (Age of Apocalypse)	Summer 2021	Sabretooth	Alternate head and hands	Age of Apocalypse version	Head
Colossus (Age of Apocalypse)	Summer 2021	Magneto	Alternate unmasked head, alternate hands and 2 energy effect pieces	Age of Apocalypse version	
Colossus (Age of Apocalypse)	Summer 2021	Rogue	Alternate hands	Age of Apocalypse version	Left arm and alternate hand
Colossus (Age of Apocalypse)	Summer 2021	Cyclops		Age of Apocalypse version	Left leg
Colossus (Age of Apocalypse)	Summer 2021	Shadowcat	Alternate claw gauntlets and hands	Age of Apocalypse version	Torso
Colossus (Age of Apocalypse)	Summer 2021	Iceman	Alternate hands	Age of Apocalypse version	Right arm and alternate hand
Colossus (Age of Apocalypse)	Summer 2021	Legion	Alternate hands	Legion Quest version	Right leg
The Watcher (What If...?)	Summer 2021	Sylvie	Dagger, alternate hands and removable cloak	Loki version	Cloak
The Watcher (What If...?)	Summer 2021	Star-Lord (T'Challa)	2 blasters and alternate unmasked head	What If...? version	Head
The Watcher (What If...?)	Summer 2021	Captain Carter	Shield	What If...? version	Arms
The Watcher (What If...?)	Summer 2021	Zombie Hunter Spidey	Cloak of Levitation, alternate unmasked head and alternate hands	What If...? version	Right leg
The Watcher (What If...?)	Summer 2021	Heist Nebula	Blaster and alternate hands	What If...? version	Torso
The Watcher (What If...?)	Summer 2021	Zombie Captain America	Shield	What If...? version	
The Watcher (What If...?)	Summer 2021	Doctor Strange Supreme	Cloak of Levitation and alternate spellcasting hand	What If...? version	Left leg
Gilgamesh (Eternals)	Fall 2021	Ikaris	Alternate head and hands	Eternals version	
Gilgamesh (Eternals)	Fall 2021	Sersi	Alternate hands	Eternals version	Right leg
Gilgamesh (Eternals)	Fall 2021	Kingo	Alternate hand and 2 blast effect pieces	Eternals version	Right arm and alternate hand
Gilgamesh (Eternals)	Fall 2021	Makkari	Alternate hands	Eternals version	Left arm and alternate hand
Gilgamesh (Eternals)	Fall 2021	Phastos	Alternate hands	Eternals version	Left leg
Gilgamesh (Eternals)	Fall 2021	Sprite	Alternate hands	Eternals version	Torso
Gilgamesh (Eternals)	Fall 2021	Druig	Alternate hands	Eternals version	Head
Armadillo	Fall 2021	Spider-Man	Alternate hands	Spider-Man: No Way Home Black & Gold Suit version Repaint of the Molten Man wave Spider-Man	Left leg
Armadillo	Fall 2021	Doctor Strange	2 spell effect hands and alternate hands	Spider-Man: No Way Home version	Head
Armadillo	Fall 2021	Spider-Man	Alternate hands	Spider-Man: No Way Home Integrated Suit version	
Armadillo	Fall 2021	J. Jonah Jameson	Alternate head and hands	Spider-Man: Far From Home version	Left arm
Armadillo	Fall 2021	Spider-Man (Miles Morales)	Alternate unmasked head, alternate venom blast hands, 2 venom blast effect pieces and 4 alternate hands	Spider-Man: Miles Morales version	Right leg
Armadillo	Fall 2021	Morlun	Alternate head		Right arm
Armadillo	Fall 2021	Shriek	4 alternate hands	Maximum Carnage version	Torso
Rintrah (Doctor Strange in the Multiverse of Madness)	February 2022	Doctor Strange	Alternate magic effect hands and alternate hands	Doctor Strange in the Multiverse of Madness version	
Rintrah (Doctor Strange in the Multiverse of Madness)	February 2022	America Chavez	Alternate hands	Doctor Strange in the Multiverse of Madness version	Torso
Rintrah (Doctor Strange in the Multiverse of Madness)	February 2022	Wong	Sword, alternate magic effect hands and alternate hand	Doctor Strange in the Multiverse of Madness version	Left arm and alternate hand
Rintrah (Doctor Strange in the Multiverse of Madness)	February 2022	Master Mordo	Staff of the Living Tribunal, crossbow and 4 alternate hands	Doctor Strange in the Multiverse of Madness version	Right arm and alternate hand
Rintrah (Doctor Strange in the Multiverse of Madness)	February 2022	Astral Doctor Strange	Eye of Agamotto, magic lamp and alternate hands	Doctor Strange in the Multiverse of Madness version Translucent recasting of the Armadillo wave Doctor Strange	Head
Rintrah (Doctor Strange in the Multiverse of Madness)	February 2022	D'Spayre	Alternate hands	Classic version	Right leg
Rintrah (Doctor Strange in the Multiverse of Madness)	February 2022	Sleepwalker	Alternate hands	Classic version	Left leg
Korg (Thor: Love and Thunder)	May 2022	Thor	Stormbreaker and alternate hand	Thor: Love and Thunder version	
Korg (Thor: Love and Thunder)	May 2022	Thor (Jane Foster)	Mjolnir and alternate unmasked head	Thor: Love and Thunder version	Left leg
Korg (Thor: Love and Thunder)	May 2022	King Valkyrie	Dragonfang sword	Thor: Love and Thunder version	Head and blaster
Korg (Thor: Love and Thunder)	May 2022	Gorr	Necrosword	Thor: Love and Thunder version	Right leg
Korg (Thor: Love and Thunder)	May 2022	Star-Lord	2 blasters	Thor: Love and Thunder version	Right arm
Korg (Thor: Love and Thunder)	May 2022	Ravager Thor	Stormbreaker	Thor: Love and Thunder version	Left arm
Korg (Thor: Love and Thunder)	May 2022	Teen Groot	Blaster, alternate hand and alternate vine arm	Thor: Love and Thunder version Redeco of the Teen Groot figure from the Infinity War box-set	Torso
Bonebreaker	August 2022	Wolverine	Translucent heat effect claws	Return of Wolverine version Repaint of the Apocalypse wave Wolverine with new claws	
Bonebreaker	August 2022	Vulcan	Alternate hands	X-Men: Deadly Genesis version	
Bonebreaker	August 2022	Darwin		X-Men: Deadly Genesis version	
Bonebreaker	August 2022	Siryn		X-Force version	
Bonebreaker	August 2022	Maggott	Eany and Meany slugs		
Bonebreaker	August 2022	Havok	Back-mounted cosmic energy effect piece	Classic version	
Bonebreaker	August 2022	Sabretooth		70s first appearance version	
The Controller	October 2022	Iron Man	Alternate hands, 2 blast effect pieces and 2 smoke effect pieces	Model 70 Armor version	
The Controller	October 2022	Thor	Power Cosmic hammer, lightning effect piece, alternate hands and Munun and Hugin	Herald of Thunder version	Head
The Controller	October 2022	Blue Marvel	2 energy effect pieces and alternate hands	Ultimates version	Left leg
The Controller	October 2022	U.S. Agent	Shield and alternate hands	Classic version	Left arm and alternate hand
The Controller	October 2022	Quake	Alternate Maria Hill head, pistol and 4 alternate hands		Left arm and alternate hand
The Controller	October 2022	Speedball		New Warriors version	Torso
The Controller	October 2022	Madame Hydra	2 pistols and alternate hands		Right leg
Infinity Ultron	Fall 2022	Moon Knight	Alternate hands and 2 Crescent Darts	Moon Knight version	
Infinity Ultron	Fall 2022	Mr. Knight	Alternate hands and 2 batons	Moon Knight version	Right arm
Infinity Ultron	Fall 2022	Ms. Marvel	Alternate hands	Ms. Marvel version	Torso
Infinity Ultron	Fall 2022	She-Hulk	Alternate hands	She-Hulk: Attorney at Law version	Left leg
Infinity Ultron	Fall 2022	Kate Bishop	Alternate hands and bow	Hawkeye version	Right leg
Infinity Ultron	Fall 2022	Hawkeye	Alternate hands and bow	Hawkeye version	Left arm
Infinity Ultron	Fall 2022	Sharon Carter	Alternate hands, baton, and combat knife	The Falcon and the Winter Soldier version	Head and lance

== 80th Anniversary Box Sets ==
Name	Figure	Accessories	Description
Hulk vs. Wolverine	Hulk	Torn shirt and alternate hands	Sal Buscema version Exclusive
Hulk vs. Wolverine	Wolverine		First appearance version Retool of the Apocalypse wave Wolverine with a new head sculpt
Colossus vs. Juggernaut	Colossus		Classic version Retool of Warlock wave release Exclusive
Colossus vs. Juggernaut	Juggernaut	Alternate hands and battle damaged head	Classic Version; Retool of the 2016 BAF; Exclusive
Thor: Ragnarok	Grandmaster	Melt stick	Thor: Ragnarok version Exclusive
Thor: Ragnarok	Korg	Laser rifle	Thor: Ragnarok version Exclusive
Captain America: The First Avenger	Captain America	Triangular shield, unpainted shield, Pistol, combat knife, alternate head and removable helmet	Captain America: The First Avenger rescue outfit version Exclusive
Captain America: The First Avenger	Peggy Carter	Machine gun	Captain America: The First Avenger version Exclusive
Ant-Man and the Wasp	Ghost	Alternate unmasked head and hood piece	Ant-Man and the Wasp version Exclusive
Ant-Man and the Wasp	Luis	Miniature laboratory suitcase and giant ant	Ant-Man and the Wasp version Exclusive
Thor: Ragnarok	Hela	Mjolnir, alternate hand, energy effect piece and two alternate unmasked heads	Thor: Ragnarok version Retool of the Gladiator Hulk wave Hela with a new head
Thor: Ragnarok	Skurge	Axe, alternate hands and two machine guns	Thor: Ragnarok version Exclusive
Avengers: Infinity War	Iron Man	Nanite shield, cluster cannons, two hand cannons, two repulsor blast effect pieces and alternate hands	Avengers: Infinity War Mark 50 version Repaint of the Thanos wave figure with new accessories
Avengers: Infinity War	Iron Spider	Alternate unmasked head and waldoes	Avengers: Infinity War version Retool of the Thanos wave Iron Spider figure with new accessories
Deadpool	Deadpool	Twin Katanas, two alternate heads, guitar, zebra print pistol, shield and Headpool	Suit version
Deadpool	Hit-Monkey	Headphones, two machine guns and two pistols	Repaint of the 2013 BAF
X-Factor	Havok	2 energy blast effects	X-Factor version Exclusive
X-Factor	Polaris	Alternate hands and two magnetic energy effect pieces	X-Factor version Exclusive
Love Triangle	Wolverine	Two alternate heads and two alternate adamantium claw hands	Bone claw version Retool of the Apocalypse wave Wolverine figure
Love Triangle	Jean Grey	Alternate ponytailed head	Jim Lee version Exclusive
Love Triangle	Cyclops	2 alternate unmasked heads	Bomber jacket version Retool of the Warlock wave Cyclops with new accessories

== Epic Heroes (2013) ==
This is the second series that does not include a Build-A-Figure since figures began to ship with Build-A-Figure pieces. Instead, each figure came with a display base, just like in the early series of Marvel Legends, though these bases included much less detail were identical.

Figure	Accessories	Description
U.S. Agent	Shield, gun and knife	
Mystique	4 guns	Modern version
Punisher	4 guns	Trenchcoat version
Punisher	4 guns	Thunderbolts red logo variant
Deadpool	Rifle, pistol and 2 katanas	Classic version
Deadpool	Rifle, pistol and 2 katanas	Uncanny X-Force version
Iron Man		Neo-Classic armor (Model 9) version
Doctor Doom	Pistol	Classic
Doctor Doom	Pistol	Future Foundation variant

== Marvel Retro ==
The Vintage series mostly consists of retooled or repainted figures featuring older designs and packaging inspired by ToyBiz's Marvel Super Heroes and X-Men lines from the 1990s, as well as the action figures from cartoons like Spider-Man: The Animated Series, Fantastic Four: The Animated Series and Iron Man: The Animated Series. However, some of the figures in the line are indeed new.

Wave	Figure	Accessories	Description
1	Captain America	Shield and alternate right hand with shield toss effect piece	Classic version Redeco of Onslaught wave Captain America with a new scale mail pattern
1	Iron Man	2 blast effect pieces	Neo-Classic armor (Model 9) version Retool of the Epic Heroes figure
1	Wolverine	Alternate unmasked head and removed mask	80s brown costume version Repaint of Juggernaut wave Wolverine with a new head and accessories
1	Spider-Man	Pizza slice and alternate head with exposed mouth	Repaint of Hobgoblin wave Spider-Man
1	Black Widow (Natalia Romanova)	Twin pistols	Classic version
1	Punisher	Bazooka and alternate head	Jim Lee version Repaint of the Walgreens exclusive Punisher
Avengers	Wasp	Miniature Ant-Man	George Perez version
Avengers	Ant-Man (Hank Pym)	Miniature Wasp	Classic version
Avengers	Black Panther	Alternate hands and two kinetic blast effect pieces	Modern version Repaint of the All-New, All-Different Black Panther
Avengers	Hawkeye	Bow and quiver	Classic version Retool of the Allfather wave Hawkeye with new arms
Avengers	Vision	Ultron head	Classic version
Avengers	Scarlet Spider (Ben Reilly)	Alternate hands and unmasked head	Repaint of the Rhino series Scarlet Spider with new accessories
X-Men	Wolverine	Muramasa blade	Madripoor outfit version
X-Men	Storm	Two lightning effect pieces	Jim Lee version
X-Men	Cyclops	Alternate head and optic blast effect piece	X-Factor version Redeco of the Toys "R" Us 2-pack
X-Men	Dazzler	Energy effect	80s version
X-Men	Silver Samurai	Katana and wakizashi	
X-Men	Iceman	Ice display base	Jim Lee version Retool of the Juggernaut wave Iceman with a new head sculpt
Spider-Man	Spider-Man	Alternate hands and head	Steve Ditko version
Spider-Man	Gwen Stacy	Carrier bag, book, paper and alternate Mary Jane head	Classic version
Spider-Man	Peter Parker	Camera and alternate Spider Sense head	
Spider-Man	Green Goblin	Glider, pumpkin bomb and alternate unmasked head	Classic version Repaint of the Sandman wave Green Goblin with a new head
Spider-Man	Electro	2 lightning effect pieces and alternate hands	Classic version
Spider-Man	Daredevil	Billy clubs, alternate hands, 2 wrist bracers and alternate unmasked head	90s armored version

=== Fan Channel exclusive Retro figures ===
Release	Figure	Accessories	Description
February 2020	Storm	2 lightning effect pieces	Black costume version Repaint of the Jim Lee Storm figure
Summer 2020	Beast	Book, reading glasses and alternate head and hands	Gray version Repaint of the Caliban wave Beast figure with a new head and accessories
Fall 2020	Mysterio	2 smoke effect pieces	Classic Version; Repaint and retool of the Lizard wave Mysterio with a new head beneath the dome
Fall 2020	Doctor Doom	Pistol, alternate hands, 2 magic effect pieces, Darkhold, Book of the Vishanti, 2 jetpack exhaust pieces and Ultimate Nullifier	Classic version Redeco of the Super-Skrull wave Doctor Doom with a new cloth shawl
January 2021	Black Cat	Cat and whip	90s version Retool of the Ultimate Green Goblin wave Black Cat figure with a new head and spiked choker
January 2021	J. Jonah Jameson	2 Daily Bugle newspapers and alternate hands	Classic version
2021	Web-Man	4 alternate hands	Spidey Super Stories version
2022	Lizard	2 alternate hands, 1 alternate head, 2 beakers, and a bendable wired tail	Classic version Walmart Exclusive
2022	Apocalypse	2 fist hands, 2 open hands, bendable wired tubes, plasma arm cannon attachment, 3 blast effects	X-Men: The Animated Series version

== Deluxe ==
Figures at a higher price point that are larger or come with additional accessories.

Figure	Year	Accessories	Description
Archangel	2018	Attachable wings, 3 alternate heads and an alternate claw hand for the 2018 Apocalypse BAF	Jim Lee version Repaint of the SDDC exclusive X-Force box set Archangel with new accessories Gamestop and Entertainment Earth exclusive
Giant-Man	2019		Captain America: Civil War version Rerelease of the 2016 BAF
Black Widow	2020	Adjustable display stand, 4 alternate hands, twin pistols, 2 ice axes, 2 electric shock effect pieces and 7 explosion effect pieces	Black Widow white version
Venom	2020		Classic version Redeco of the Monster Venom BAF in classic colors
The Kingpin	2020	Walking stick and alternate battle damaged head	Classic version Repaint and retool of the 2019 BAF with a new cravat piece Fan Channel exclusive
War Machine	2020	2 shoulder cannons, 5 blast effect pieces, 2 smoke effect pieces, 2 exhaust flame effect pieces, fire display base and alternate unmasked head	Classic version
Red Hulk	2020	Alternate hands	Target exclusive
Apocalypse	2020	Skull, alternate head and hand	Age of Apocalypse version Retool of the 2018 BAF with a new head and accessories
Toxin (Eddie Brock)	2020	Attachable tendrils	Fan channel exclusive
Outback Hulk	2020	Alternate head and hands	Marvel's Avengers video game version GameStop exclusive
Thanos	2021	Alternate King Thanos head and alternate hands	The Infinity Gauntlet version
M.O.D.O.K.	2021	Alternate hands and swappable faceplate	Classic version
Vulture (MCU)	2021	Posable wings and gauntlets	Spider-Man: Homecoming version Target exclusive
Compound Hulk	2021	Alternate hands	Hulk vol. 2 #30 version Walmart exclusive
Maestro	2021	Alternate hands	Old Man Logan version Fan Channel exclusive
Kro (MCU)	2021	Attachable tendrils	Eternals movie version Fan Channel exclusive
Hydra Stomper	2021	Alternate hands, jetpack, and boost effects	What If...? TV series version Fan Channel exclusive
Ragnarok	2022	Alternate hand, alternate head, Mjolnir, and a spinning Mjolnir effect	Target exclusive
Ulik	2022	Alternate hands, alternate head, and hammer	Classic version Walmart exclusive
Defender Strange	2022	Alternate hands, portal	Doctor Strange in the Multiverse of Madness version Target exclusive
Rhino	2022	Alternate head and alternate hands	Classic version Fan Channel exclusive

== Single releases ==
Figures released without a Build-a-Figure piece that are not included in waves or as retail exclusives.

Release	Figure	Accessories	Description
Fall 2020	Wolverine	Alternate hands and alternate screaming head	X-Men (2000 film) version
Fall 2020	Mystique	Alternate transforming arm and alternate hands	X-Men (2000 film) version
Fall 2020	Domino	Pistol, 2 submachine guns, alternate hands and alternate head	Deadpool 2 version
January 2021	Firestar and Ms. Lion	Alternate head, 2 flame effect pieces and alternate hands	Fan channel exclusive
Summer 2021	She-Hulk	Alternate head and hands	Modern version Repaint of the Super-Skrull wave She-Hulk with a new head and classic green skin Fan channel exclusive

== Ultimate Riders ==
A series of figures that come packaged with vehicles, similar to the ToyBiz Legendary Riders wave.

Figure	Year	Accessories	Description
Black Widow (Natalia Romanova)	2018	Motorcycle and alternate head	
Ghost Rider (Johnny Blaze)	2018	Hell Cycle and flaming chain	Repaint of the Rhino series Ghost Rider
Logan	2018	Motorcycle, alternate "Patch" head and hands	Casual clothes version
Professor X	2019	Hover chair, Cerebro helmet, hover effect and alternate Shadow King head for the Kingpin BAF	Jim Lee version
Deadpool, Squirrelpool and Dogpool	2019	Scooter, sticker sheet and alternate Bob, Agent of Hydra head for the previous Hydra Soldier figures	
Squirrel Girl	2020	Scooter, Tippy-Toe, and two other squirrels	The Unbeatable Squirrel Girl version
Ultimate Captain America	2020	Motorcycle, shield, combat knife, machine gun, pistol, holster and removable helmet	World War 2 version
Cosmic Ghost Rider	2020	Hell Cycle, two blasters, flaming chain and hover effect piece	
Punisher	2020	Motorcycle, shotgun, 2 machine guns, machete, baseball bat, Viking helmet and alternate head	Punisher Kill Krew version

== Best of Marvel Legends ==
An annual series U.K./Australia-exclusive waves that solely repackage figures and BAFs based on characters from the Marvel Cinematic Universe.

Build-A-Figure	Release	Figure	Accessories	Description	Build-A-Figure Piece
Hulkbuster (Avengers: Age of Ultron)	2016	Loki	Loki's scepter and removable helmet	The Avengers version Re-released (Non-Legends) from Hasbro's Walmart movie line	Right arm
Hulkbuster (Avengers: Age of Ultron)	2016	Black Widow	Alternate hands	Avengers: Age of Ultron version Re-released from Mandroid Series	Upper torso
Hulkbuster (Avengers: Age of Ultron)	2016	Captain America	Shield	The Avengers version Re-released (Non-Legends) from Hasbro's Walmart movie line	Left arm
Hulkbuster (Avengers: Age of Ultron)	2016	Thor	Mjolnir	Avengers: Age of Ultron version Re-Released from Amazon-Exclusive 4-Pack	
Hulkbuster (Avengers: Age of Ultron)	2016	War Machine	Shoulder-mounted machine gun	Avengers: Age of Ultron (Mark 2) version Re-Released from Hulkbuster Series	Right leg
Hulkbuster (Avengers: Age of Ultron)	2016	Iron Man		Avengers: Age of Ultron (Mark 43) version; Re-Released from Thanos Series	Left leg
Hulkbuster (Avengers: Age of Ultron)	2016	Hulk		Avengers: Age of Ultron version Re-Released from Thanos Series	Head
Hulkbuster (Avengers: Age of Ultron)	2016	Hawkeye	Bow and quiver	Avengers: Age of Ultron version Re-Released from the Amazon 4-Pack	Lower torso
Giant-Man (Captain America: Civil War)	2017	Captain America	Shield	Captain America: Civil War version Rereleased from the Giant-Man wave	Head
Giant-Man (Captain America: Civil War)	2017	Iron Man	Alternate hands and blast effects	Captain America: Civil War (Mark 46) version Rereleased from the Giant-Man wave	Right arm
Giant-Man (Captain America: Civil War)	2017	Black Panther	Alternate unmasked head	Captain America: Civil War version Rereleased from the Giant-Man wave	Left leg
Giant-Man (Captain America: Civil War)	2017	Scarlet Witch	2 Hex effect pieces	Captain America: Civil War version Rereleased from the Abomination wave	Left arm
Giant-Man (Captain America: Civil War)	2017	War Machine	Two stun batons, shoulder-mounted cannon, two attachable machine guns, right leg and alternate hands	Captain America: Civil War (Mark III) version Rereleased from the Target Civil War 2-pack	Right leg
Giant-Man (Captain America: Civil War)	2017	Falcon	Redwing drone, attachable wings and flight pack	Captain America: Civil War version Rerelease of the Walmart-exclusive figure	
Giant-Man (Captain America: Civil War)	2017	Winter Soldier	Handgun, torso and combat knife	Captain America: Civil War version Rerelease of the Walmart-exclusive figure	Torso
Gladiator Hulk (Thor: Ragnarok)	2018	Star-Lord	Sony Walkman and two blasters	Guardians of the Galaxy Vol. 2 version Released from the Ego two-pack	Right leg
Gladiator Hulk (Thor: Ragnarok)	2018	Thor	Twin swords	Thor: Ragnarok version Rereleased from the Gladiator Hulk wave	Hammer
Gladiator Hulk (Thor: Ragnarok)	2018	Hela	Sword	Thor: Ragnarok version Rereleased from the Gladiator Hulk wave	Head and helmet
Gladiator Hulk (Thor: Ragnarok)	2018	Loki		Thor: Ragnarok version Rereleased from the Gladiator Hulk wave	Right arm
Gladiator Hulk (Thor: Ragnarok)	2018	Gamora	Sword and gun	Guardians of the Galaxy Vol. 2 version Rereleased from the Mantis wave	Left arm and axe
Gladiator Hulk (Thor: Ragnarok)	2018	Rocket	Baby Groot and 2 guns	Guardians of the Galaxy Vol. 2 version Rereleased from the Mantis wave	Torso
Gladiator Hulk (Thor: Ragnarok)	2018	Drax	2 Knives	Guardians of the Galaxy Vol. 2 version Rereleased from the Titus wave	Left leg
Thanos (Avengers: Infinity War)	2019	Captain America	Wakandan shield and alternate hands	Avengers: Infinity War version Rereleased from the Thanos wave	Left arm
Thanos (Avengers: Infinity War)	2019	Black Widow	Connecting batons, tasers and alternate hands	Avengers: Infinity War version Rereleased from the Cull Obsidian wave	Left leg
Thanos (Avengers: Infinity War)	2019	Thor	Stormbreaker and lightning effect	Avengers: Infinity War version Rereleased from the Cull Obsidian wave	Head
Thanos (Avengers: Infinity War)	2019	Iron Man	Alternate hands and blast effects	Avengers: Infinity War (Mark 50) version Rereleased from the Thanos wave	
Thanos (Avengers: Infinity War)	2019	Iron Spider		Avengers: Infinity War version Rereleased from the Thanos wave	Right arm
Thanos (Avengers: Infinity War)	2019	Ant-Man	Alternate unmasked head	Ant-Man and the Wasp version Rereleased from the Cull Obsidian wave	Right leg
Thanos (Avengers: Infinity War)	2019	Hope van Dyne	Alternate unmasked head, hands and backpack	Ant-Man and the Wasp version Rereleased from the Cull Obsidian wave	Torso
Armored Thanos (Avengers: Endgame)	2020	Captain America	Shield	Avengers: Endgame version Rereleased from the Walmart Worthy Cap	Right Leg
Armored Thanos (Avengers: Endgame)	2020	Black Widow	Connecting batons, tasers and alternate hands	Avengers: Endgame version Rereleased from the incorporate the Infinity War body minus the vest with the headsculpt originally included with the Target 2-pack that had Hawkeye and Black Widow in their Quantum Realm suits.	Right Arm and Sword
Armored Thanos (Avengers: Endgame)	2020	Thor	Stormbreaker	Avengers: Endgame version Rereleased from the Cull Obsidian wave	Head
Armored Thanos (Avengers: Endgame)	2020	Iron Man	Alternate hands and blast effects	Avengers: Endgame (Mark 85) version Rereleased from the Fat Thor wave	
Armored Thanos (Avengers: Endgame)	2020	Iron Spider		Avengers: Endgame version Rereleased from the Thanos wave	Left arm
Armored Thanos (Avengers: Endgame)	2020	Black Panther	Alternate unmasked head	Avengers: Endgame version Rereleased from the M'Baku wave	Left leg
Armored Thanos (Avengers: Endgame)	2020	Rescue	Backpack	Avengers: Endgame version Rereleased from the Smart Hulk wave	Torso

== 2 Packs ==
Series	Release	Name	Figure	Accessories	Description
1	2008	Elektra and Ronin	Elektra	Weapons and interchangeable parts	
1	2008	Elektra and Ronin	Ronin (Clint Barton)	Weapons and interchangeable parts	
1	2008	Skrull Elektra (Pagon) and Ronin (Variant)	Secret Invasion version	Weapons and interchangeable parts	
1	2008	Skrull Elektra (Pagon) and Ronin (Variant)	Ronin (Clint Barton)	Weapons and interchangeable parts	
1	2008	Mister Fantastic and Thing	Mr. Fantastic		Classic colors version
1	2008	Mister Fantastic and Thing	Thing		Classic colors version
1	2008	Ultimate Nick Fury and Ultimate Captain America	Ultimate Nick Fury	Weapons and interchangeable parts	
1	2008	Ultimate Nick Fury and Ultimate Captain America	Ultimate Captain America	Weapons and interchangeable parts	
1	2008	Wolverine and Forge	Wolverine	Weapons and interchangeable parts	
1	2008	Wolverine and Forge	Forge	Weapons and interchangeable parts	
2	2009	The Hand ninja and Nick Fury	The Hand ninja	Weapons and interchangeable parts	
2	2009	The Hand ninja and Nick Fury	Nick Fury	Weapons and interchangeable parts	
2	2009	Chaste ninja and Dum Dum Dugan	variant	Weapons and interchangeable parts	white Hand repaint
2	2009	Chaste ninja and Dum Dum Dugan	Dum Dum Dugan	Weapons and interchangeable parts	
2	2009	Invisible Woman and Human Torch	Invisible Woman	Classic colors	
2	2009	Invisible Woman and Human Torch	Human Torch		
2	2009	Maria Hill and Iron Man	Maria Hill	Weapons and interchangeable parts	Some Maria Hill heads have red hair rather than black.
2	2009	Maria Hill and Iron Man	Iron Man	Weapons and interchangeable parts	Classic (Model 4) Armor version
2	2009	Sharon Carter and Iron Man	Sharon Carter	Weapons and interchangeable parts	
2	2009	Sharon Carter and Iron Man	Iron Man	Weapons and interchangeable parts	Stealth Armor (Model 7) version variant
2	2009	Skrull Soldier and Kree Soldier	Super Skrull	Weapons and interchangeable parts	Repaint of the (Non-Legends) Super-Skrull figure from ToyBiz's Fantastic Four Classics line
2	2009	Skrull Soldier and Kree Soldier	Kree Soldier	Weapons and interchangeable parts	
3	2017	Guardians of the Galaxy Vol. 2	Star-Lord	2 blasters, alternate helmeted head and portable cassette player (Walkman)	
3	2017	Guardians of the Galaxy Vol. 2	Ego the Living Planet	Alternate head	Exclusive
3	2017	Spider-Man: Homecoming	Iron Man	Alternate head and blast effect	Mark 47 version Exclusive
3	2017	Spider-Man: Homecoming	Spider-Man	Alternate unmasked head and attachable web wings Reissue of the Vulture wave Spider-Man figure with a new head	
4	2018	The Astonishing Ant-Man	Ant-Man (Scott Lang)		All-New, All-Different Marvel version Exclusive
4	2018	The Astonishing Ant-Man	Stinger		Exclusive
4	2018	A.I.M.	A.I.M. Scientist	2 alternate heads, 5 guns, backpack and 2 ammo belts	
4	2018	A.I.M.	A.I.M. Shock Trooper	2 alternate heads, 5 guns, backpack and 2 ammo belts	
	2020	Deadpool 2	Deadpool	Twin katanas, 2 pistols, knife, 6 alternate hands, and plush unicorn	
	2020	Deadpool 2	Negasonic Teenage Warhead	2 energy effect pieces and alternate hands	
	2020	X-Men 20th Anniversary	Professor X	Wheelchair, 3 alternate hands and alternate Patrick Stewart head	X-Men: Days of Future Past version
	2020	X-Men 20th Anniversary	Magneto	Alternate unmasked head, alternate hands and 2 alternate Ian McKellen heads	X-Men: Days of Future Past version
	2020	Old Man Logan	Old Man Logan and Bruce Banner Jr.	Cowboy hat, alternate hands and alternate head	Retool of the Warlock wave Old Man Logan with a new head and trench coat
	2020	Old Man Logan	Old Man Hawkeye	2 bows, quiver and alternate blind head	
	2020	Rogue vs. Pyro	Rogue	Alternate head and hands	X-Men: Regenesis version
	2020	Rogue vs. Pyro	Pyro	Alternate head and 2 flame effect pieces	Classic version
	2020	Storm and Thunderbird	Storm	Alternate head, hands, and cape	Giant Size X-Men
	2020	Storm and Thunderbird	Thunderbird	Alternate head	Giant Size X-Men

== Box Sets ==
Name	Release	Figure	Accessories	Description
Captain America: Civil War	2016	Captain America	Battle damaged shield and alternate head	Battle damaged version
Captain America: Civil War	2016	Iron Man	Blast effects and alternate head	(Mark 46) battle damaged version
Captain America: Civil War	2016	Spider-Man		Exclusive
Avengers: Infinity War	2018	Thor	Heimdall's sword	Statesman version Exclusive
Avengers: Infinity War	2018	Rocket	Laser cannon and two handguns	Repaint of the Mantis wave figure with a new head
Avengers: Infinity War	2018	Adolescent Groot	Handheld video game	Exclusive
Black Widow	2021	Red Guardian	Alternate unmasked head, alternate hands, shield and miniature Red Guardian action figure	Exclusive; Retool and redeco of the Crimson Dynamo wave Red Guardian with two new, more movie-accurate head sculpts
Black Widow	2021	Melina Vostokoff	Alternate hands, batons and grappling hook	Exclusive

== Marvel Studios: The First Ten Years (2018) ==
Film	Figure	Accessories	Description
Iron Man	Tony Stark		Exclusive
Iron Man	Iron Man	Launchable flame projectile	Mark I version Repainted (Non-Legends) figure from Hasbro's 2008 Iron Man movie line
Captain America: The First Avenger	Red Skull	Energy rifle, alternate hand, chest harness and three alternate Hydra soldier heads	
The Avengers	Iron Man	Alternate hands and blast effects	Mark VII version
Thor: The Dark World	Thor	Mjolnir	Retool of the Amazon exclusive Age of Ultron box set Thor with a new head and arms
Thor: The Dark World	Sif	Shield and twin swords	Exclusive
Avengers: Age of Ultron	Hulkbuster		Avengers: Age of Ultron version Redeco of the BAF
Avengers: Age of Ultron	Hulk		Avengers: Age of Ultron version Retool and repaint of the Thanos wave Hulk with a new head sculpt
Ant-Man	Ant-Man	Alternate unmasked head and miniature Ant-Man	Retool of the Ultron wave Ant-Man figure with a new, movie-accurate helmet sculpt
Ant-Man	Yellowjacket	Miniature Yellowjacket	Exclusive
Captain America: Civil War	Captain America	Shield and alternate unmasked head	Repaint of the Giant-Man wave figure with a new head
Captain America: Civil War	Crossbones	Alternate unmasked head and power gauntlets	Exclusive
Avengers: Infinity War	Iron Man	Alternate hands and blast effects	Mark L Retool of the Thanos wave Iron Man with a new light-up arc reactor
Avengers: Infinity War	Thanos	Alternate head	Retool of the Thanos BAF with a new head and Infinity Gauntlet open hand
Avengers: Infinity War	Doctor Strange	Magic effects and alternate left hand	Repaint of the Dormammu wave figure with a new head, cape and magic effect right arm

== 80th Anniversary ==
Figure	Accessories	Description
Captain America	Shield, alternate masked head, closed fists and shield throwing hand.	Alex Ross version
Iron Man	Model 4 armor, alternate unmasked head, alternate Silver Age head and two repulsor blast effect pieces	Alex Ross version
Thor	Mjolnir	Alex Ross version
Logan	Alternate head, hands and Muramasa blade	Outback cowboy hat version Retool of the Ultimate Riders Logan with a new head Fan channel exclusive
Spider-Man	Web line and four alternate hands	Big Time version Repaint of the Hobgoblin wave Spider-Man; Fan channel exclusive
Agent Anti-Venom	Four guns and four tendrils	Repaint of the Walgreens exclusive Agent Venom figure Fan channel exclusive
Punisher	Assault rifle, handgun, sniper rifle and alternate camouflage head	Fan channel exclusive
Iron Man	Energy sword, two repulsor blast effects and four alternate hands	Stealth Armor (Model 51 with stealth colors) version Redeco of the Okoye wave Iron Man with new accessories Fan channel exclusive
Punisher	Two stun batons, shoulder-mounted cannon, two attachable machine guns, right leg and alternate hands	War Machine armor version Repaint of the Target exclusive War Machine Mark III from the Captain America: Civil War two-pack Fan channel exclusive
