= Negasonic Teenage Warhead =

Character from Marvel Comics

Eloise Olivia "Ellie" Phimister Negasonic Teenage Warhead
- Negasonic Teenage Warhead as depicted in Deadpool & the Mercs for Money #7 (January 2017); Art by Iban Coello and Nolan Woodard.

Publication information
- Publisher: Marvel Comics
- First appearance: New X-Men #115 (August 2001)
- Created by: Grant Morrison; Frank Quitely

In-story information
- Full name: Eloise Olivia "Ellie" Phimister
- Species: Human mutant
- Team affiliations: X-Men; Hellfire Club; Mercs for Money
- Notable aliases: Warhead; Megasonic Endless Godhead
- Abilities: Superhuman strength, speed, durability, agility, balance and reflexes; Telekinesis; Flight; Telepathy; Precognition; Reality selection; Future life power acquisition; Current: Portal manipulation; Pocket dimension; Previous: Reality manipulation; Matter and energy manipulation; Transmutation; Power blasts; Cosmic hunger; Time manipulation; Size alteration; Power Cosmic

Negasonic Teenage Warhead (Eloise Olivia "Ellie" Phimister) is a superheroine appearing in American comic books published by Marvel Comics. Created by Grant Morrison and Frank Quitely and named after the Monster Magnet song of the same name, the character first appeared in New X-Men #115 (2001). She belongs to a subspecies of humans called mutants, who are born with superhuman abilities. Negasonic Teenage Warhead possesses a revolving set of powers derived from her future selves.

Originally a minor character who was killed on Genosha, Negasonic Teenage Warhead was resurrected during the events of "Necrosha" and later joined the Mercs for Money. In the series Deadpool & the Mercs for Money, Negasonic Teenage Warhead was redesigned to resemble her appearance in the Deadpool films, in which she was portrayed by Brianna Hildebrand.

== Publication history ==
Negasonic Teenage Warhead first appeared in New X-Men #115 (2001), and was created by writer Grant Morrison and artist Frank Quitely.

Negasonic Teenage Warhead's Infinity Series comics #44 - #49, originally released in 2022, were collected and re-printed as a solo comic in November 2024.

== Fictional character biography ==
Negasonic Teenage Warhead as depicted in Astonishing X-Men #13 (April 2006). Art by John Cassaday.

Ellie Phimister is introduced as a teenager who attends Emma Frost's telepathy class in Genosha. During a tutoring session, Ellie reports having a recurring nightmare 50 times the previous night where Genosha is attacked. Simultaneously, Sentinels attack Genosha and massacre 16 million of its residents, including Ellie.

=== Return ===
Negasonic Teenage Warhead is apparently seen alive as a member of the Hellfire Club, who attack the X-Men at the Xavier Institute. After awakening from a coma, Cyclops attacks the Hellfire Club with a pistol. Ellie and all the other members of the Hellfire Club disappear, having been projections of Emma Frost's mind.

=== Necrosha ===
In Necrosha, Selene and Eli Bard resurrect Negasonic Teenage Warhead and other mutants using the Transmode Virus. Unlike other resurrected mutants, Ellie does not fall under Selene's control.

=== Marvel Now! ===
In Marvel Now!, Ellie resurfaced sometime later, alive and well, having begun a mundane life in Albuquerque. Deadpool and the Mercs for Money capture her at the behest of an organization called Umbral Dynamics, unaware that the group intends to siphon her power. After her rescue and the defeat of Presence, Negasonic Teenage Warhead adopts a new punk-inspired look and joins Domino's incarnation of the Mercs for Money alongside Hit-Monkey. It is later revealed that Hit-Monkey was assigned to the team to keep an eye on Ellie, as S.H.I.E.L.D. was wary of her growing abilities.

In an alternate future brought about by Negasonic Teenage Warhead's intervention in the Inhumans vs. X-Men storyline, the conflict between the Inhumans and the X-Men never ends. The Inhuman Lash instigates violence against mutants, whom he deems have blasphemed against the Terrigen Mist cloud. Negasonic Teenage Warhead hides deep in the Amazon with an enclave of mutants, only to be attacked by Lash after Deadpool inadvertently leads him to them. Negasonic Teenage Warhead travels back to the past to stop herself from changing the timeline, thus averting the future.

Ellie chooses to leave Krakoa long before the end of the Krakoan Age and returns to working with Wade Wilson. She later receives a vision regarding an improbable pan-dimensional infraction of calamitous proportions revolving around her people skills and mingling issues that will result in the destruction of all reality. She is confronted by the Time Variance Authority, which is considering killing her to avert the devastation. The cross-reality Armageddon is derailed by Emma Frost, Jean Grey, Wanda Maximoff, Tabitha Smith, Susan Storm, and Deadpool, all of whom delay the TVA to avert Ellie becoming a Galactus-lite entity.

== Powers and abilities ==
Ellie possesses superhuman strength, speed, durability and reflexes. She is able to overpower a host of skilled, military, or uniquely trained mercenaries in hand-to-hand combat, as well as showcasing superhuman physical prowess beyond the norm. She can read the thoughts of others and project her own with her telepathic abilities. She possesses precognitive abilities. Ellie is able to harness, generate, and absorb radioactive energy, allowing her to transmute and levitate matter. In later appearances, it was elaborated that Ellie's powers stem from an ability to manipulate reality at a quantum level and gain the abilities of her potential future selves.

== In other media ==
Brianna Hildebrand as Negasonic Teenage Warhead in Deadpool.

=== Film ===
- Negasonic Teenage Warhead appears in Deadpool (2016), portrayed by Brianna Hildebrand. This version is an X-Men trainee who is able to create high-impact kinetic charges. This change was made after 20th Century Fox and Marvel Studios struck a deal to allow Marvel Studios to use Ego the Living Planet in the film Guardians of the Galaxy Vol. 2.
- Negasonic Teenage Warhead appears in Deadpool 2, portrayed again by Brianna Hildebrand. She has become a full member of the X-Men and entered a relationship with Yukio.
- Negasonic Teenage Warhead appears in Deadpool & Wolverine, portrayed again by Brianna Hildebrand.

=== Video games ===
- Negasonic Teenage Warhead appears as a playable character in Marvel: Future Fight.
- Negasonic Teenage Warhead appears as a playable character in Marvel Strike Force.
- Negasonic Teenage Warhead appears in Marvel Puzzle Quest.
- Negasonic Teenage Warhead appears in Marvel Snap.
- Negasonic Teenage Warhead appears as a playable character in Marvel Contest of Champions.
