= Mercs for Money =

Fictional comic book mercenary team

- Textless cover of Deadpool & the Mercs for Money #1 (July 2016). Art by Iban Coello.

Publication information
- Publisher: Marvel Comics
- First appearance: Deadpool #1 (Dec. 2015)
- Created by: Gerry Duggan

Mercs for Money is a superhero mercenary team appearing in American comic books published by Marvel Comics.

== Publication history ==
Mercs for Money first appeared in Deadpool #1 (Dec. 2015) and were created by Gerry Duggan. Eight months after the events of the Secret Wars storyline as seen during the All-New, All-Different Marvel event, Deadpool establishes a new team of Heroes for Hire. The roster consists of Solo, Madcap, Masacre, Slapstick, Foolkiller, Terror and Stingray. Matt Murdock and Luke Cage are shown planning legal action against Deadpool. After the lawsuit goes through, Deadpool renames his Heroes for Hire group into Deadpool's "Mercs for Money."

== Fictional history ==
=== Deadpool's Mercs for Money ===
This group of mercenaries gathered together by Deadpool was originally named Heroes for Hire. Deadpool was inspired to create a franchise around his identity after Solo impersonated him and piggybacked on the merc's success to take jobs at Deadpool's pay rate. Solo's impersonation helped Deadpool become more popular, thus benefiting both mercs.

After turning Solo into his first employee, Deadpool began to recruit other vigilantes who would initially wear costumes identical to his like Foolkiller, Madcap, Masacre, Slapstick, Stingray and Terror. Deadpool's team was legally forced to change their name after receiving a cease an desist letter from Luke Cage and Matt Murdock. They chose "Mercs for Money" as the replacement name. What the other members don't know is that Stingray is secretly working for Captain America to keep him updated on the more deranged members of the Mercs for Money. Around this time, the Mercs for Money began to use color-coded costumes to distinguish each other from an independent Deadpool impersonator who was ruining the real one's reputation. It turned out that the evil Deadpool impersonator was Mercs for Money member Madcap. Once they got rid of Madcap, the Mercs for Money began using their own personal uniforms.

During the "Civil War II" storyline, the members of the Mercs for Money have been displeased when expecting Deadpool to give them their paychecks. While trying to start their own business, the Mercs for Money members discover that they were being skimmed by Deadpool. Upon retrieving a safety deposit from Ho-Ho-Kus, New Jersey, and setting their contracts on fire, the Mercs for Money and Deadpool went their separate ways.

=== Domino's Mercs for Money ===
A second incarnation of Mercs for Money appears in the 2016 "Marvel NOW!" After Deadpool's failed attempt at saving Negasonic Teenage Warhead (who he and the Mercs for Money had previously obtained for Umbral Dynamics), Domino shows up to where Deadpool is and reveals to him that she has assembled a new Mercs for Money team consisting of herself, Gorilla-Man, Machine Man, and a reenlisted Masacre. Domino told Deadpool that they showed up to help him and states that she is the one calling the shots for the Mercs for Money. Following the defeat of the Presence, Negasonic Teenage Warhead and Hit-Monkey join the Mercs for Money.

== Membership ==
=== Members of Deadpool's Mercs for Money ===
- Deadpool - Leader
- Foolkiller (Gregory P. Salinger)
- Madcap
- Masacre
- Scott Adsit
- Solo
- Slapstick
- Stingray - He was an undercover operative working for Captain America.
- Terror

=== Members of Domino's Mercs for Money ===
- Domino - Leader
- Deadpool
- Gorilla-Man (Kenneth Hale)
- Hit-Monkey
- Machine Man
- Masacre
- Negasonic Teenage Warhead

== Collected editions ==
Title	Material Collected	Publication Date	ISBN
Deadpool & The Mercs For Money Vol. 0: Merc Madness	Deadpool & The Mercs For Money (vol. 1) #1-5 and Deadpool: Masacre #1	August 30, 2016	978-0785192640
Deadpool & The Mercs for Money Vol. 1: Mo' Mercs, Mo' Monkeys	Deadpool & The Mercs For Money (vol. 2) #1-5	February 28, 2017	978-1302902636
Deadpool & The Mercs for Money Vol. 2: IvX	Deadpool & The Mercs For Money (vol. 2) #6-8 and Deadpool Annual (2016) #1	May 9, 2017	978-1302908768
Deadpool Classic Vol. 23: Mercs For Money	Deadpool & The Mercs For Money (vol. 1) #1-5, Deadpool & The Mercs For Money (vol. 2) #1-8 and Deadpool: Back In Black #1-5	February 27, 2019	978-1302916046
