= Madcap (comics) =

- Madcap in Ghost Riders: Heaven's on Fire #4 (November 2009). Art by Roland Boschi.

Publication information
- Publisher: Marvel Comics
- First appearance: Captain America #307 (July 1985)
- Created by: Mark Gruenwald; Paul Neary

In-story information
- Species: Human mutate
- Place of origin: Earth
- Team affiliations: Wild Pack; Unkillables; Masters of Evil; Mercs for Money; Ghost Rider Assassination League
- Notable aliases: Deadpool
- Abilities: Healing factor; Insanity inducement

Madcap is a supervillain appearing in American comic books published by Marvel Comics.

== Publication history ==
Madcap first appeared in Captain America #307 (July 1985), and was created by Mark Gruenwald and Paul Neary.

Most of the villains Gruenwald introduced in Captain America were created to symbolize aspects of contemporary American culture and the world political situation. Gruenwald stated "Madcap represents purposelessness, the disaffected youth of today who thinks 'What's the reason for doing anything?' The ultimate dropout generation."

== Fictional character biography ==
Madcap (true name unknown) was originally a deeply religious young man. On the way to a picnic with his family and church community, their bus collides with a tanker truck full of Compound X07 (an experimental nerve agent developed by A.I.M.). Everyone aboard the bus, including his parents and sister Katy, are killed, leaving him as the only survivor, his body mixing with the Compound. When being told of the deaths of all his friends and family, his mind shatters, his belief in a rational universe swept away. Leaving the hospital, he attempts suicide by throwing himself in front of traffic. He is injured but the wounds heal almost instantly. This pushes him further over the edge. After purchasing a toy soap bubble pistol from a dime store and donning a garish clown costume stolen from the Ace Costume Shop, the newly christened Madcap sets out to convince others that life is entirely without reason. Spewing absurdist philosophy, he runs rampant through the streets of Manhattan, causing mass chaos and a riot. Nomad tries to stop him, but Madcap uses his madness-inducing powers on him as well. Nomad recovers, tracks Madcap to a shack in an old fairground at Coney Island, and defeats him there.

Madcap is confined to a mental hospital but escapes. He gets back into costume and breaks up a shipment of illegal arms organized by Rose. In the course of the fight he meets Dollar Bill, who runs a Manhattan public-access television cable television show. The two film A Day in the Life of a Superhero, which is interrupted when Rose's underlings abduct Madcap. Taken to a warehouse, Madcap is tied up, beaten, and assaulted with an axe. Daredevil intervenes, but in the subsequent fight the warehouse is burned down, and Madcap ignores Daredevil's repeated appeals to get out of the fire. When his body is found, Madcap is declared legally dead but slowly returns to life while in the morgue. He returns to Dollar Bill's show.

Prior to the Secret Invasion, Madcap encounters Deadpool, and in the midst of an altercation with Daredevil and Thor, Thor's lightning reduces the two to ash. Though it initially seems that only Deadpool regenerates and survives, he eventually realizes the two actually regenerated as one being, with Madcap becoming one of the "voices" within Deadpool's head. After Madcap's personality asserts itself sufficiently to use his own powers in a later altercation with Thor and Luke Cage, Deadpool convinces Madcap to manipulate the two affected heroes into tearing Deadpool's body in half, with one half regenerating fully as Deadpool, and the other as Madcap.

Eight months after the events of Secret Wars, Madcap is revealed to have been psychologically damaged even further by his fusion with and separation from Deadpool. When Deadpool founds the Mercs for Money, Madcap infiltrates the team, feigning benevolence and incompetence. Madcap begins impersonating Deadpool, attacking his allies and using his powers to incite violence throughout New York City in Deadpool's name. Upon discovering that Madcap was responsible for the chaos, Deadpool lured him out by using his own daughter, Ellie, as bait, and confronted Madcap alongside Masacre, the Deadpool of Mexico. Madcap gains the upper hand in the brawl, which ends with him using Deadpool's molecular disintegrator on himself.

Madcap resurfaces during Civil War II as a parasitic entity and forces his human host to act against Deadpool. After luring Deadpool to the Central Park Zoo, Madcap and his host infect him with a stolen virus that Deadpool begins unknowingly spreading across New York City. Deadpool acquires a cure to the virus and locates Madcap, whose host is revealed to be Bob, Agent of Hydra. When Deadpool implies that everything that Madcap remembers about his past is a lie, an enraged Madcap detaches from Bob to attack him, and proceeds to escape under the cover of an explosion while swearing further revenge on Deadpool.

After Madcap nearly ruins his Valentine's Day, Deadpool ventures into space in search of a weapon that can permanently kill the villain, and while there he strikes a bargain with the Collector, who agrees to imprison Madcap in his museum. When Madcap seeks him out, Deadpool successfully ensnares "the indestructible clown" for the Collector. As Madcap is hauled away, Deadpool realizes that the victory is a hollow one after Madcap gloats that he no longer cares about ruining Deadpool's life, as Deadpool's recent dealings with Stryfe and Hydra have already accomplished that for him.

During the "One World Under Doom" storyline, Madcap joins the Mad Thinker's incarnation of the Masters of Evil and assists them in invading the Impossible City. Captain America decapitates Madcap and uses his head's psychotic gaze to subdue Mister Hyde. After Mad Thinker is defeated by the Avengers, Madcap's body tries to drop the Ashen Combine's prison on Earth, only to be taken down by Captain America's shield.

== Powers and abilities ==
Madcap possesses two superpowers as a result of the mutagenic effects of his exposure to Compound X07:

- Madcap possesses a powerful healing factor that enables him to resurrect himself after being killed. He can mentally control his severed limbs. His rapid healing ability also gives him high endurance, as his body eliminates fatigue poisons and heals muscle damage caused by overexertion almost instantaneously.
- Madcap has a specialized form of insanity-inducement that is activated via eye contact. People affected by his power act in a euphoric, uninhibited manner that verges on or becomes insanity and can end up killing themselves.
