= Hit-Monkey =

Comic book character

- Textless cover of Hit-Monkey #1 (April 2010). Art by Frank Cho.

Publication information
- Publisher: Marvel Comics
- First appearance: Hit-Monkey #1 (February 2010)
- Created by: Daniel Way; Dalibor Talajić

In-story information
- Alter ego: Unknown
- Species: Japanese macaque
- Team affiliations: Mercs for Money; S.T.A.K.E. Pet Avengers
- Notable aliases: Hit-Monkey
- Abilities: Japanese macaque physiology granting superhuman agility and reflexes; Expert marksman and martial artist

Hit-Monkey is a character appearing in American comic books published by Marvel Comics. Created by Daniel Way and Dalibor Talajić, the character first appeared in Hit-Monkey #1 (April 2010).

== Publication history ==
Hit-Monkey debuted in the digital comic on Marvel Digital Comics Unlimited Hit-Monkey #1 (April 2010), created by writer Daniel Way and artist Dalibor Talajić. The one-shot was released in print format a week later and, starting in the same month, he was featured in a three-issue story arc in Deadpool #19-21. Cover artist Dave Johnson also accidentally confirmed that Hit-Monkey would be featured in his own three issue limited series, a fact later confirmed by Daniel Way at the 2010 Chicago Comic & Entertainment Expo.

== Fictional character biography ==
An unnamed assassin blows up a squad of enemy soldiers as part of a failed political coup. Marked for death and after four days of fleeing for his life, he passes out in the snow and is rescued by a troop of Japanese macaques. With the exception of one monkey, the troop accepts the assassin into their clan. The man knows that he is still hunted, so he trains daily, using snowmen as training dummies. Quietly, the monkey that distrusts him watches and learns the assassin's skills. The assassin's health fails, and while the troop tries to save him, the lone monkey objects, eventually fighting the rest of the troop with his newfound skills. Because of the violence he displays, the monkey is banished from the clan. Now on his own, the monkey sees a group of men on their way to kill the assassin. He tries to run back to warn his tribe, but is too late: the men kill the assassin as well as the rest of the monkeys. Furious at his clan's slaughter, the monkey picks up extra guns from a bag and kills the entire group of men. Determined to avenge his fallen tribe, the monkey now dedicates his life to killing assassins - under the alias of Hit-Monkey.

In Deadpool #19, Spider-Man finds a local shop owner brutally murdered. Having seen Deadpool in New York earlier, Spider-Man suspects he is the killer, and fights and catches him. Deadpool claims he has an alibi, and after examining the crime scene, says that only one assassin could have pulled off the job so flawlessly: Hit-Monkey. Because Hit-Monkey is known for killing other assassins, they realize that Deadpool is likely on Hit-Monkey's hit list. Spider-Man reluctantly teams up with Deadpool to catch him.

After killing some dirty cops, Hit-Monkey follows Spider-Man in order to find and kill Deadpool. Hit-Monkey accidentally shoots Spider-Man in the fight and seemingly feels bad about it, showing that he is not just a ruthless killer, but a killer of known assassins. Trying to capitalize on this moment, Deadpool attempts to kill Hit-Monkey, but fails and is shot several times. Hit-Monkey leaves him for dead, apparently not knowing about Deadpool's healing factor. Deadpool then pretends to be Spider-Man and fakes his death. At "Spider-Man's" funeral, Hit-Monkey comes to pay his respect, thinking he killed him. Deadpool jumps out of the casket to kill Hit-Monkey, but Spider-Man has rendered both fighters' guns unusable so they can't kill each other without blowing themselves up as well. Deadpool doesn't care and pulls the trigger, seemingly killing Hit-Monkey but surviving due to his healing factor. Spider-Man reveals that Hit-Monkey did survive or, at least, that his body was not found. Hit-Monkey later returns for a short cameo.

In All-New, All-Different Marvel, Hit-Monkey appears as a member of the Howling Commandos.

Hit-Monkey later joins Domino's incarnation of the Mercs for Money.

Hit-Monkey is seen with the Howling Commandos when they help Old Man Logan rescue Jubilee from Dracula.

Hit-Monkey returned to fight The Hand.

== Powers and abilities ==
Hit-Monkey possesses the normal attributes of a Japanese macaque, which includes superhuman agility and reflexes. He is also an expert marksman and martial artist.

== Other versions ==
=== Secret Wars (2015) ===
An alternate universe version of Hit-Monkey appears in the "Secret Wars" storyline. In the Battleworld domain of Killville, he is one of the assassins sent to kill MODOK and Angela.

=== Ultimate Universe ===
An alternate universe version of Hit-Monkey appears in The Ultimates. He was among the prisoners of H.A.N.D. until Wasp frees him.

== In other media ==
=== Television ===
Hit-Monkey appears in a self-titled series, with his vocal effects provided by Fred Tatasciore. The series was originally conceived as part of a shared universe that would have led up to a special titled The Offenders before it was turned into a stand-alone series.

=== Video games ===
- A video game based on Hit-Monkey was announced to be in development by High Moon Studios and published by Activision for release in 2013. However, this was revealed to be a red herring meant to foreshadow the release of Deadpool.
- Hit-Monkey appears as an unlockable playable character in Lego Marvel Super Heroes 2.
- Hit-Monkey appears as a playable character in Marvel Contest of Champions.
- Hit-Monkey appears in Marvel Snap.
- Hit-Monkey appears in Marvel Puzzle Quest, including a variant created for the game who wears an E.D.I. Suit with Loki's powers.

== Collected editions ==
Title	Material Collected	Published Date	ISBN
Deadpool, Volume 4: Monkey Business	Hit-Monkey One-Shot and Deadpool (vol. 2) #19-22	December 1, 2010	978-0785145318
Hit-Monkey: Year of the Monkey	Hit-Monkey #1-3, Hit-Monkey One-Shot	January 5, 2011	978-0785148593
Hit-Monkey by Daniel Way: Bullets & Bananas	Hit-Monkey #1-3, Hit-Monkey One-Shot, Deadpool (vol. 2) #19-21	October 29, 2019	978-1302920357
