= Cable & Deadpool =

Comic book series

- Cover to Cable & Deadpool #5. Art by Mark Brooks.

Publication information
- Publisher: Marvel Comics
- Schedule: Monthly
- Genre: Superhero
- Publication date: May 2004 – April 2008
- No. of issues: 50
- Main character(s): Cable; Deadpool

Creative team
- Created by: Cable: Rob Liefeld; Louise Simonson; Deadpool: Rob Liefeld; Fabian Nicieza
- Written by: Fabian Nicieza; Reilly Brown
- Artist(s): Mark Brooks; Patrick Zircher; Lan Medina; Reilly Brown; Ron Lim; Staz Johnson; Jon Malin

Collected editions
- If Looks Could Kill: ISBN 0-7851-1374-6
- Burnt Offering: ISBN 0-7851-1571-4
- The Human Race: ISBN 0-7851-1763-6
- Bosom Buddies: ISBN 0-7851-1869-1
- Living Legends: ISBN 0-7851-2041-6
- Paved With Good Intentions: ISBN 0-7851-2233-8
- Separation Anxiety: ISBN 0-7851-2523-X

Cable & Deadpool was a comic book series published by Marvel Comics beginning in 2004. The title characters, Cable and Deadpool, share the book's focus. The series was launched following the cancellation of the characters' previous ongoing solo series. The book's mix of humor, action, and intricate plotting has won it a devoted fanbase. Marvel Comics canceled the series with issue #50 to make way for a new Deadpool ongoing series that began on September 10, 2008, and a new Cable ongoing series launched in March 2008. Cable & Deadpool were ranked #7 on Marvel.com's list of "The 10 Greatest Buddy Teams" of all time.

== Main characters ==
- Cable (Nathan Dayspring Askani’son Summers) is the time-traveling son of Cyclops and Madelyne Pryor (a clone of Jean Grey). Cable, having mutant powers and knowing what the future could be, is trying to bring about a better world.
- Deadpool (Wade Wilson) is a talkative mercenary for hire known as the "Merc with a Mouth". Like Wolverine, he is a subject of the Weapon X experiment for which he volunteered in the hopes of finding a cure for his cancer. Although he received an enhanced body from the project, the cancer was not cured, he went insane, and his skin became covered in hideous scars. Deadpool helps to further Cable's plans, sometimes unwittingly.

== Minor and recurring characters ==
- Agent X (Alex Hayden) was injected with the "American Gene" during a botched mission infiltrating a Hydra base, making him incredibly obese. He appointed Deadpool as the head of his mercenary organization, Agency X, while he is getting back in shape.
- Black Box (Garabed Bashur), a one-time information broker, worked for Cable in hopes of changing the world. He was killed by Sabretooth.
- Bob, Agent of Hydra is an average Hydra agent pressed into service by Deadpool during his mission to rescue Agent X. He now works with Agency X.
- Domino is the on/off confidante, lover, and teammate of Cable. She knows Cable better than most and is scared and excited about what might happen if he succeeds.
- Nick Fury is the former Director of S.H.I.E.L.D. Fury appears early in the series after Cable threatens to use his out-of-control telekinesis to throw all the world's nuclear weapons into space. Later, he sends Captain America to infiltrate Providence.
- Prester John, time-displaced from the past, operates Providence's multi-religious studies program and occasionally ends up fighting to defend Providence.
- Johann Kriek, a former Interpol operative, is now the Chief of Security for Providence.
- Irene Merryweather, a former reporter for the Daily Bugle, is now the Chief of Staff on Providence and Cable's chronicler.
- Rabbi Rosen is a Rabbi aboard Providence. Rosen tends to offer advice where he can.
- Weasel is a technological genius and one of Deadpool's best friends. Weasel aids in some of Deadpool's activities.
- Outlaw (Inez Temple) is an attractive and short-tempered mercenary from Texas who is currently employed by Agency X. She is a mutant with enhanced durability, speed, and incredible accuracy with firearms (even rivaling Bullseye in terms of targeting skills). She is a descendant of the Outlaw Kid and dresses in a cowgirl motif.
- Sandi Brandenberg is the secretary of Agency X, as well as a former love interest to both Deadpool and Agent X. She is currently the girlfriend of the Taskmaster. She was recently kidnapped and kept bound and gagged along with Outlaw by T-Ray, but was rescued by Deadpool.
- Six Pack is a group of mercenaries hired by S.H.I.E.L.D. to watch over Cable. They are: G. W. Bridge, Hammer, Domino, Solo, Anaconda, and Constrictor.

== Features ==
=== Recap page ===
Starting with issue #11, Cable & Deadpool opens each book with a unique recap page. This page, usually presented by Deadpool and occasionally with Cable or by/with the book's supporting characters, villains, and guest stars, breaks the fourth wall and literally talks to the audience. Keeping with the book's tone, the recap page is usually funny, often with Deadpool having to explain what the fourth wall is to other characters on the page. From issue #44, the recap pages have been in the form of an online blog as written by Bob, Agent of Hydra.

=== Dear Deadpool ===
Issue #13 saw the start of "Dear Deadpool", a letters page seemingly hosted by Deadpool himself. Like the recap page, "Dear Deadpool" is often comical and has Deadpool breaking the fourth wall. In this section, Deadpool frequently refers to not only the characters in this comic, but often mentions (and makes fun of) the creators, as well as various conventions of Marvel Comics and the comics industry in general. He even goes so far as to refer to "the man who types my answers". A running gag features Deadpool's excitement over a typical feature of comic book fan letters: a numbered list of questions. This would prompt the response, "Ooh, numbered questions!" In 2006, Wizard Magazine named "Dear Deadpool" as "the Funniest Letters Page in Comics".

== Story arcs ==
=== If Looks Could Kill ===
"If Looks Could Kill" (issues #1-6) brings Cable and Deadpool together (literally). In this first story arc, Deadpool is hired by "The One World Church" to steal a virus that will allow them to turn everyone on Earth blue. Meanwhile, Cable is trying to figure how to best use his newly enhanced mutant powers to help change the world. Through a series of events, both Cable and Deadpool end up back at "The One World Church" where they are both infected by the virus. In order for them both to survive, Cable absorbs and then throws up Deadpool which ends up mixing their DNA. Cable eventually takes control of the virus and uses it to turn the entire world pink. A couple of days later, Cable restores everyone to their original color, and takes credit for this calling himself their "Saviour". During this, Cable uses his enhanced powers to rebuild his space station, Graymalkin, which includes a teleportation system. Because of the mixing of their DNA, both Cable and Deadpool can teleport, but when one does it he takes the other with him.

=== Burnt offering ===
In "The Burnt Offering" (issues #7-10, originally known as "The Passion of the Cable"), Cable continues with his plan to espouse a philosophy of moderation, and offers invitations to the world's top thinkers, scientists and philosophers to live on Providence (the recently rebuilt Graymalkin) in the face of a nervous S.H.I.E.L.D. Delivering a stark message to the world's leaders, he deliberately sets them all against him by threatening to throw their missiles into the sun. Meanwhile, the X-Men, including Cable’s father Cyclops, hire Deadpool to gather pieces of a mini-teleporter in order to stop Cable. After they mounted an attack on Providence, Cable confesses to Deadpool that he'd wanted to be killed in order to set an example of how the world could work together, even if it were against him. After being injured by the Silver Surfer, Cable has Deadpool use the mini-teleporter to lobotomize Cable in order to save him from burning out as X-Man had. With the last of his powers, Cable left the world a final message of what the world could be if everyone tried a bit harder to make it a better place.

=== Thirty pieces ===
Cover to Cable & Deadpool #12 Art by Patrick Zircher

During "Thirty Pieces" (issues #11-12), Deadpool goes on a quest to save Cable's life. After obtaining a techno-organic alien from MODOK, Deadpool tracks down the Fixer in hopes that he would be able to fix Cable. Along the way, Deadpool battles Agent X who was hired by what appears to be a religious organization to track Deadpool in order to prevent the 'resurrection' of Cable. After having the alien grafted to his body, Cable, who is comatose and trapped in a dreamscape with the Six Pack, overcomes the alien’s brain and heals himself, though he still extremely depowered.

=== Murder in Paradise ===
"A Murder in Paradise" (issues #13-14) starts on Providence with the murder mystery of Haji Bin Barat, the world’s most wanted terrorist. Deadpool insists on being involved in the investigation, but Irene Merryweather takes charge. Eventually Deadpool, and everyone else, realizes that he was the only person that could have killed Barat. Following a fight with Prestor John, Cable confronts Deadpool, who admits he cannot remember killing Barat. Although Cable wants to help Deadpool, he tells him he has to leave the island until he gets back from a mission with X-Force. Deadpool leaves Providence in search of Black Box, whom he hopes can find a way to kill him.

=== Enema of the State ===
From Cable & Deadpool #17 Art by Patrick Zircher.

"Enema of the State" (issues #15-18) takes place after the end of the X-Force miniseries where Cable vanished after defeating the mutant-hunting Skornn. After finding and being brainwashed by the Black Box to kill Cable, Deadpool returns to Providence where he finds Siryn and 'Cannonball' (Deadpool loses some respect for Sam Guthrie on learning his true codename) who are also looking for Cable. With the help of Forge, Deadpool uses a modified version of the teleportation device to track down Cable through various dimensions with Siryn and Cannonball following three minutes behind. The group travels through these dimensions finding Cable as a Horseman of Apocalypse (War); a messiah-like, benevolent dictator; and the central conscience of a Phalanx invasion of Earth. Finally in the House of M reality, Deadpool finds a baby version of Cable in the care of Mister Sinister. After the House of M reality fades, Cable starts to age and his memory is restored. He then burns out his restored powers to 'fix' Deadpool’s mind. With Cable depowered and still in his teens, Deadpool teleports them both to Intercourse, Pennsylvania.

=== Why, When I Was Your Age ===
"Why, When I Was Your Age..." (issue #19) picks up with Deadpool taking Cable to Intercourse, PA, with hopes that the city will live up to its name. While at a bar, Cable talks about growing up in the future, and Deadpool discusses the death of his father. At the end of the night, Cable is fully aged, and neither of the two wish to discuss what actually happened in their past.

=== Bosom Buddies ===
In "Bosom Buddies" (issues #20-23), Deadpool is hired to steal the Dominus Objective, a secondary hard drive that acts like a virus that acts like a server. While Deadpool is out to steal the Objective, he ends up fighting both the B.A.D. Girls, Luke Cage and Iron Fist only to discover that the Dominus Project had already been stolen. Later, The B.A.D. Girls confront Shen Kuei (The Cat) who actually stole the Dominus Objective. The Cat reveals to them it was the Black Box who hired him originally, though it was Cable who paid him, as well as who hired them and Deadpool. In the final confrontation, Cable links with Dominus Objective which gives him a new power similar to his telepathy. When everything is settled, Black Box decides to work for Cable.

=== Sticky Situations and Living Legends ===
In "Sticky Situations" and "Living Legends" (issues #24 & 25), Deadpool is hired to steal plans for a secret government project called the "Cone of Silence", which was originally designed as a force field to cut off Providence from the rest of the world. During his escapades, Deadpool ends up briefly fighting Spider-Man before finally getting the plans. After realizing that it was probably Cable who had the plans stolen, Nick Fury sends Captain America to infiltrate Providence. Captain America finds Providence to be a peaceful place and learns of Cable's past and his plans to change the future. During a fight between Cable and Captain America, Cable reveals that he has used the "Cone of Silence" to create a technological replacement for his telekinesis.

=== Born Again ===
In "Born Again" (issues #26 & 27), the story reveals the hidden past connections between Apocalypse and Cable, specifically that it was Cable who infected Apocalypse with the techno-organic virus that Apocalypse would pass on to Cable as an infant.

=== The Domino Principle ===
In "The Domino Principle" (issues #28 & 29), Cable employs Deadpool to remove Flag-Smasher as the ruler of Rumekistan. Flag-Smasher had become ruler in the mini-series Citizen V & The V-Battalion: The Everlasting, also written by Fabian Nicieza. The coup becomes complicated with the separate interferences of Citizen V and Cable's old love interest, Domino. Although Cable successfully manipulates Domino into assassinating Flag-Smasher, he finds his own resolve shaken when faced with his ex-lover's doubts about his agenda.

=== Civil War ===
In the "Civil War" story arc, Deadpool has been given the job of hunting down super-powered individuals who have not signed the Superhuman Registration Act. There is a confrontation between Cable and Deadpool in which Cable reveals that he will be fostering superheroes in Providence. When Cable meets Captain America to extend this offer, Cap refuses. Cable tries to convince him by revealing what he knows about the Secret Avengers' secret identities. This gesture does not go unnoticed by Deadpool, who is watching them from a nearby rooftop and notes Daredevil's new identity. He attacks Daredevil in a warehouse, and is himself attacked by members of the Secret Avengers and the Young Avengers. Cable attempts to intervene and convince Deadpool to join their cause by offering him a bigger paycheck (and when Deadpool refuses, a bigger badge). This fails when Deadpool tries to shoot Cable with tranquilizer darts, which Cable deflects into Wade's face. Wade wakes up bound and gagged (with a full body covering of duct tape, after Cable suggested an entire roll for his mouth alone) in the warehouse before Cable reappears, setting him free and taking him along to the White House to meet with the American President about the possible repercussions of the superhero registration act. When the President orders hostilities on Cable (Deadpool had briefly left to go to the bathroom), he and Deadpool shift out before anyone can get harmed. They arrive in the countryside, where Deadpool attacks (following the President's orders) Cable. After a brief fight, Cable reveals the fight to have been staged and televised in order to lose Deadpool his job as a government agent. The arc ends with a very uneasy truce between the two men.

=== Six Packs and Powder Kegs ===
In "Six Packs and Powder Kegs" (issue 33 - 35) story arc, a massive explosions rocks Cable's island paradise of Providence. Bodysliding back from Rumekistan (which he has been working to install democracy within), Cable finds that a saboteur may still be hidden on the island. His search for the bomber is stopped when he finds reports that the United States, along with several European allies, have sent the mercenary group Six Pack into Rumekistan to disrupt the peace. Cable arrives and attempts to stop the group, only to note that there are five members present. The mysterious sixth member and the terrorist bomber on Providence? Deadpool, who shoots Cable in the back of the head while his personal force field is down. Cable is knocked unconscious, but not killed. Domino is upset at Deadpools actions, and the Six Pack leaves Cable lying in the street. He is recovered by the citizens of the city while the Six Pack plan to de-power the country goes through. While news reports of the happenings in both Rumekistan and Providence are aired, Cable's seemingly unconscious body seems to take power from one of the few remaining sources, the hospital that his citizens were taking him to. Cable's body levitates, and he ends up using his technology to repair the damage done by the Six Pack. Conscious again, he tracks down the Six Pack. Domino asserts that Cable acts as if he'd planned the entire thing from the start. Cable tells them that in order to do so, he'd need the ability to read minds or at least be "able to predict the future." Telling Deadpool to "Get the Hell out of my country and never come back!" he throws Deadpool from Rumekistan, while keeping the rest of the Six Pack disabled. He then has Domino explain the happenings on TV, while Deadpool thinks it was all to punish him for opposing Cable during the Civil War. Cable and Domino then share a kiss. In the letters page, Deadpool is upset at his depiction on the next issue's cover, and asserts that it should be both an epilogue to this arc and a prologue to the next arc which should center around him.

=== Unfinished Business ===
In "Unfinished Business" (issue 36 - 39) Deadpool has to find a way to get his reputation back for being one of the best mercenaries for hire. After consulting Blind Al for validation of his plan, and getting Weasel to help him with the preparations, he kidnaps a mother and two children from a highway rest stop at 2 in the morning, setting them tied up in the middle of the road forcing a large armored truck to stop and investigate. He then proceeds to knock out the guards and blow a hole in the back of the truck with a bazooka, thus freeing a well known mercenary and trainer of supervillain henchmen, Taskmaster. He tells Taskmaster (whom he affectionately calls 'Tasky') that he won't owe him anything. He simply wants a trade. His freedom, in exchange for a fight with Deadpool. He explains that he wants to have the bout where "Insidious, malevolent, Machiavellian people who do the hiring for our kind are gathered." He then promptly knocks Taskmaster unconscious so as to skip a lot of explaining and move right onto the fight. It turns out that he kidnapped a select group of the kinds of people who hire mercenaries, and has Weasel show them the fight on a projector. He has himself manacled and fights Taskmaster, all the while spouting comments about his abilities as though the captives were watching an advertisement. Even though Taskmaster stabs him straight through the chest, Deadpool comes out on top, returning the battered opponent and himself to the room where the men are held. His plan fails however, as they are just as reluctant to hire him as ever. Taskmaster re-awakens and Deadpool thanks him for letting him win. Taskmaster then tells Deadpool that he didn't let him win, saying "The truth is... You're that good. You've always been that good. Which won't get you a cup of coffee until you figure out how to be a professional..." He then leaves and Deadpool is left to reflect on this as he realizes that neither he nor Weasel have the keys to his handcuffs. Two weeks later, a still handcuffed Deadpool struggled with a twist top beer, and while watching the news, hears that Rhino has escaped. This strikes him with the revelation that if he can't be a mercenary, he'll become a superhero.

However, Rhino has hired someone to feed Deadpool Hank Pym's pills after hearing that Deadpool was after him, which result in Deadpool shrinking, since Rhino planned to turn Deadpool into a keychain as retaliation to the same that Deadpool did to him during the first Deadpool running series. Although, Deadpool soon beats up and defeats Rhino, along with various bar goers to who Rhino was showing off his "deadpool-keychain" to.

While still shrunken, Deadpool is informed by Sandi and Outlaw that Agent X was captured by Hydra while he was fighting Hydra, a terrorist organization, to steal a "morphogenic actuator", which can be used to cure or cause diseases. Deadpool, with Weasel, goes to the Hydra Headquarters where Agent X is being held, in Pakistan. Using his small size to his advantage, Deadpool infiltrates the Headquarters and captures Bob, Agent of Hydra, to help him get to Agent X. It is then found that the actuator has been used to give Agent X morbid obesity by scientists experimenting with the actuator, and that it can not be removed by the actuator. Deadpool then forces the scientists to turn him back to his normal size ("They had some Pym Particles lying around. Figured they must. Who doesn't, right?") and gets Bob to drive a plane with Deadpool, obese Agent X and the actuator towards home. However, they forgot to get Weasel. During the journey home, Agent X levels with Deadpool, asking him if he could take over Agency X (Agent X's company of hireling mercenaries) while he deals with his weight problem. However, T-Ray has returned and captured Sandi and Outlaw, using them in his plan to kill Deadpool and Agent X for stealing his identity. Deadpool succeeds in killing T-Ray with his katana. Deadpool then recounts how Cable healed him of his insanity and that T-Ray and Deadpool had shared memories and that Deadpool spotted many holes in his story.

=== Fractured ===
In "Fractured" (#40-42) Cable's island of Providence is attacked by the creature Hecatomb, who Cable's X-Men are fighting. When Deadpool and the Agency X gang hear of this, they travel to Providence to help Cable. However, Rogue has already defeated Hecatomb by absorbing the 8 billion people's minds it absorbed. Sabretooth attacks the building where Irene Merryweather and the Black Box are. Domino heads for the building to rescue them as Cable heads for the Power Core. Domino gets to the building to discover that Sabretooth has killed Black Box and is holding Irene hostage by using her as a human shield. Deadpool, who has parachuted from the Angency X jet, shoots Sabretooth and Irene manages to roll away. Domino takes Irene to the evacuation boats. Deadpool then proceeds to shoot Sabretooth repeatedly, stating that he knows he's running out of bullets, but he wonders if there will be anything left of Sabretooth for his healing factor to heal, just as he runs out bullets. Domino gets Irene to the evacuation boats as Cable joins them after he added just enough energy to the island to "finish the job." Domino makes Cable promise not to commit suicide, as Providence has a fail-safe system should Cable die. As Domino leaves, Cable wonders how many promises he's broken. Cable goes to help Deadpool get rid of Sabretooth by hurling him out to the middle of the ocean. Cable then sends Deadpool to obtain secrets about the future (in the form of a mini statue of Anton Krutch) that could be dangerous if in the wrong hands. Cable heads for the Core, where he is attacked by Gambit and Sunfire. Meanwhile, Deadpool succeeds in locating the statue, but is attacked by Senyaka, former Acolyte.

As Cable makes a run for the Core, Deadpool continues to fight Senyaka for the mini statue. Cable makes it to the Core and activates the self-destruct system as Deadpool finally gets his hands on the mini statue, which turns out to be a teleport matrix. Gambit and Sunfire escape as Providence explodes. Deadpool is teleported to his apartment where Deadpool claims he wasn't worth it and that he won't let Cable down.

=== Alone Again, Naturally ===
In "Alone Again, Naturally" (#43-50), after meeting Cyclops at a memorial statue of Cable, Deadpool goes to the Hydra base to finally save Weasel because if he doesn't, Wolverine will kill him and everyone else in the base. He almost succeeds but after trying to reason with Wolverine, Deadpool is decapitated. However Bob finally proves his worth by placing Deadpool's head back on his shoulders while Wolverine deals with the offending Hydra agents. Deadpool, Weasel, and Bob leave the Hydra base after Weasel's sabotage imprisons the remaining Hydra soldiers; however, the same device malfunctions as they head home, teleporting Deadpool and Bob to World War II Germany.

Having found themselves alongside Captain America and a foul-mouthed Bucky Barnes, Deadpool and Bob join in on the fight against the Nazis. All goes well but due to 'temporal hiccups', Captain America and Bucky seem to repeatedly forget who Deadpool and Bob are. The group heads off to find Doctor Zola and do battle with a Frankenstein Monster of his, but seem to be trapped in the past. Meanwhile, in the present time, Weasel has convinced the Fantastic Four to let him use their time machine, pointing out how bad an idea it is to have Deadpool and a rogue Hydra agent remain lost in time. He is unsuccessful however, and the Fantastic Four offer to help bring Deadpool home instead.

Using the technology provided by the Fantastic Four of the present day Weasel managed to pull Deadpool and Bob to the Baxter Building although at an earlier point in time where he meets the older iteration of the Fantastic Four (although appearing through Doctor Doom's time platform doesn't help matters, also with the 'temporal hiccups' still in effect the team gets quite confused about why there is a Hydra] agent at their breakfast table). Eventually they agree to help Deadpool return to the future, although complications mean he and Bob end up falling further and further into the time-stream until they are rescued at the last minute by both time periods versions of the Fantastic Four. After being dismissed from the Baxter Building for his mercenary lifestyle (although Sandi and Outlaw, who also work for Agency X are invited to stay for poker) Deadpool, Bob and Weasel return to the Agency X offices. Here they find Doctor Strange who has come to recruit Deadpool to save the multiverse from a problem he apparently created.

Unfortunately for Deadpool this involves finding T-Ray's body, so he and Bob sent to fight their way through various mystical realms by Dr. Strange to search for it. Upon finding T-Ray, Dr Strange reveals that at the moment Deadpool killed him he had used his black magic to try to escape through a 'mystical burrow', this sent him tumbling through various magical planes leaving the barriers between frayed. Deadpool had been sent to collect the portions of life essence he left in each realm, which he now has to use to restore T-Ray to life. After replacing the life essence, Dr Strange informs Deadpool and Bob that although T-Ray's body is complete, his soul is still missing. He then sends them to the Louisiana swamps where they meet Brother Voodoo, who arranges for Deadpool to confront T-Ray's soul and try to restore it to his body. After an antagonistic encounter, Deadpool succeeds and, as both had to be kept alive, they somewhat amicably part ways.

Deadpool is later contacted by Irene Merryweather who asks him to retrieve an "electro-polarity reconfiguration engine" left over in the Savage Land by Magneto to help power Rumekistan since Cable's death. After being attacked by a mind-controlled Ka-Zar and eventually freeing him, Deadpool, Weasel and Bob discover Brainchild has taken over. After Deadpool breaks in and finds the "reconfigurator" Weasel and Bob teleport to him. Brainchild then sends an army of dinosaurs to attack them which Deadpool teleports to Genosha using Weasels pene-traitor technology. After Deadpool shoots down Brainchild's escape dinosaur Ka-zar agrees to let him take the "reconfigurator". Weasel then points out that Deadpool sent the dinosaurs not to Genosha but the Genoshan embassy in New York City where they break open a van which the Mighty Avengers and Fantastic Four were using to transport the Venom symbiote, this quickly combines with the dinosaurs leaving an army of venomsaurs loose in Manhattan.

Deadpool then returns to New York to fight the venomsaurs. At first, he and Spider-Man fight them, but Weasel, the Fantastic Four and the Mighty Avengers all help Deadpool clean up the mess that he made. Agent X even gets in on the action, and Bob manages to bring down one of the bigger venomsaurs, regaining the respect of his wife, who saw it on TV. After much fighting, Deadpool is eventually knocked far away from the action. Cable (from the future) manages to send a psimitar, which can destroy the symbionts on the dinosaurs. Deadpool takes on the last venomsaur, and almost gets absorbed by the symbiote. However, Deadpool stabs himself in the head with the psimitar, and is released from the grip of the symbiote. Deadpool awakes to find out from the Avengers that the dinosaurs have been returned to the jungle thanks to Weasel.

It all ends with Deadpool back at his apartment watching TV. Deadpool had been blamed for the incident by the media on TV. Weasel, Bob, Irene Merryweather, Agent X, Sandi, and Outlaw all come in to hang out with Deadpool. The series ends with Deadpool asking his friends, "So... whaddyou guys want to watch?"

== Creators ==
=== Writers ===
- Fabian Nicieza (issues #1-48, script #49-50)
- Reilly Brown (issues #49-50)

=== Artists ===
- Mark Brooks (issues #1-2)
- Patrick Zircher (issues #3-24)
- Lan Medina (issues #25-27)
- Reilly Brown (issues #28, #33-36, #38, #40-42, #45-46, #48-50)
- Ron Lim (issues #29, #39, #43-44, #47)
- Staz Johnson (issues #30-32, #37)
- Jon Malin (issue #42)

== Collected editions ==
- Cable & Deadpool:
  - Deadpool & Cable Omnibus (collects Cable & Deadpool 1-50, Deadpool/GLI Summer Fun Spectacular and material from Deadpool (2012) #27, 1272 pages, November 2014, ISBN 9780785192763)
    - Ultimate Collection Book 1 (collects Cable & Deadpool #1-18, 440 pages, March 2010, ISBN 0-7851-4313-0) previously collected as:
      - Volume 1: If Looks Could Kill (collects Cable & Deadpool #1-6, 136 pages, December 2004, ISBN 0-7851-1374-6)
      - Volume 2: The Burnt Offering (collects Cable & Deadpool #7-12, 144 pages, May 2005, ISBN 0-7851-1571-4)
      - Volume 3: The Human Race (collects Cable & Deadpool #13-18, 144 pages, November 2005, ISBN 0-7851-1763-6)
    - Ultimate Collection Book 2 (collects Cable & Deadpool #19-35, 424 pages, July 2010, ISBN 0-7851-4821-3) previously collected as:
      - Volume 4: Bosom Buddies (collects Cable & Deadpool #19-24, 144 pages, April 2005, ISBN 0-7851-1869-1)
      - Volume 5: Living Legends (collects Cable & Deadpool #25-29, 144 pages, August 2006, ISBN 0-7851-2041-6)
      - Volume 6: Paved With Good Intentions (collects Cable & Deadpool #30-35, 144 pages, May 2007, ISBN 0-7851-2233-8)
    - Ultimate Collection Book 3 (collects Cable & Deadpool #36-50 and Deadpool/GLI: Summer Fun Spectacular, 424 pages, October 2010, ISBN 0-7851-4920-1) previously collected as:
      - Volume 7: Separation Anxiety (collects Cable & Deadpool #36-42, 176 pages, September 2007, ISBN 0-7851-2523-X)
      - Volume 8: Deadpool vs. The Marvel Universe (collects Cable & Deadpool #43-50, 192 pages, May 2005, ISBN 0-7851-2524-8)
  - Other Reading:
    - X-Force & Cable, Volume 1: The Legend Returns (collects X-Force (vol. 2) #1-6, 144 pages, April 2005, ISBN 0-7851-1429-7)
