= Weapon P.R.I.M.E. =

Fictional comic book group

Publication information
- Publisher: Marvel Comics
- First appearance: X-Force #11 (June 1992)
- Created by: Rob Liefeld; Mark Pacella

In-story information
- Base(s): Department K
- Member(s): Double Trouble; Killjoy (aka Killspree); Tygerstryke; Yeti; Garrison Kane; Grizzly; G. W. Bridge; Rictor

Weapon P.R.I.M.E. is a group of fictional superhuman operatives appearing in American comic books published by Marvel Comics. They are usually depicted as acting under the authority of Canada's Department K. They became Canada's preeminent superhero team after the demise of Alpha Flight. Their first appearance and mission was in X-Force #11-14. As revealed in the Official Handbook of the Marvel Universe: A-Z, P.R.I.M.E. stands for "Prototype Induced Mutation Echelon."

== Team history ==
The Weapon P.R.I.M.E. project is first activated for combat by Garrison Kane to track down Cable and bring him to justice for perceived crimes. Kane and G. W. Bridge, both former members of Cable's mercenary group Six Pack, attempt to convince their organizations that Cable needs to be brought down with or without proof of current crimes. On his next mission, Kane is ambushed by the Mutant Liberation Front and taken to Stryfe, who claims to be Cable. Given the proof they needed, Kane and Bridge have Weapon P.R.I.M.E.'s mission approved, recruiting Yeti, Tygerstryke, Rictor, and Grizzly.

The group's first mission is to ambush Cable and X-Force at their base in the Adirondack Mountains. They attack as X-Force is preparing to vacate the base, as its secrecy had already been compromised by Mister Tolliver and Deadpool. The base is rigged to self-destruct and goes off during Weapon P.R.I.M.E.'s fight to capture Cable. Cable escapes, resulting in Weapon P.R.I.M.E. disbanding.

The second line-up of Weapon P.R.I.M.E. consists of Tygerstryke, Yeti, Double Trouble, and Killjoy. They attempt to stop former Six Pack members Grizzly, Domino, and Hammer from stealing files on Cable from Department K. The infiltrators download the entire chunk of encrypted data and narrowly escape by going through the ceiling and ductwork.
