= Grizzly (comics) =

Marvel Comics supervillain

Grizzly is the name of four unrelated characters appearing in American comic books published by Marvel Comics. The first is a wild west villain, the second is an A.I.M. Agent, the third is a foe of Spider-Man, and the fourth is a mutant and member of Six Pack.

== Publication history ==
The third Grizzly is ex-wrestler Maxwell "Max" Markham, one of Spider-Man's enemies. He first appeared in The Amazing Spider-Man #139 (Dec. 1974) and was created by Gerry Conway and Ross Andru.

The fourth Grizzly is Theodore Winchester. He first appeared in X-Force #8 and was created by Rob Liefeld.

== Fictional characters biographies ==
=== Grizzly (Ace Fenton) ===
Grizzly

Publication information
- Publisher: Marvel Comics
- First appearance: Rawhide Kid vol. 4 #40 (June 1964)
- Created by: Stan Lee; Dick Ayers

In-story information
- Alter ego: Ace Fenton
- Species: Human
- Abilities: Wears a steel-lined grizzly bear costume

Ace Fenton is a criminal in the Old West who went by the Grizzly name. During a bank robbery, he encounters Two-Gun Kid and Rawhide Kid. When Rawhide Kid is suspected of robbing a train, Two-Gun Kid advises him to turn himself over. Fenton begins stirring up the people of Tombstone to turn against the Rawhide Kid, claiming that he trained Grizzly to rob a train. On the day of the trial, Grizzly breaks into the courtroom and abducts Rawhide Kid to make it look like they are partners in crime. Rawhide Kid defeats Ace Fenton and hands him over to the authorities.

=== Grizzly (A.I.M. operative) ===
Grizzly

Publication information
- Publisher: Marvel Comics
- First appearance: Captain America #120 (Dec. 1969)
- Created by: Stan Lee; Gene Colan; Joe Sinnott

In-story information
- Alter ego: Unrevealed
- Species: Human
- Team affiliations: A.I.M.
- Notable aliases: Agent R-1
- Abilities: Use of a laser pistol

A.I.M. sends Grizzly and Agent R-2 to capture atomic scientist Paul Fosgrave at Manning University. Posing as students, they persuade Mart Baker to help them by using the Hypno-Ray to turn protests into hostile activities as a cover to capture Fosgrave. Baker demands that his committee be placed in control of the university, resulting in a massive fight. As Fosgrave is taken away, Captain America pursues Grizzly alongside Baker. Grizzly tries to escape on the copter with Fosgrave, but Captain America shoots the copter down with Grizzly's gun. Fosgrave is brought to safety, Agent R-2 is defeated, and Baker and his followers are granted amnesty by the university. Grizzly's fate after the copter crashed is unrevealed.

=== Grizzly (Maxwell "Max" Markham) ===
Grizzly
- Grizzly as seen on the cover of The Amazing Spider-Man #139 (Dec. 1974)

Publication information
- Publisher: Marvel Comics
- First appearance: The Amazing Spider-Man #139 (Dec. 1974)
- Created by: Gerry Conway; Ross Andru

In-story information
- Alter ego: Maxwell "Max" Markham
- Species: Human
- Team affiliations: Legion of Losers; Thunderbolts
- Partnerships: Jackal; Kraven the Hunter
- Notable aliases: "Crazy Max" Markham
- Abilities: Adept wrestler Exoskeleton bear suit grants: Superhuman strength and durability Razor-sharp claws

Maxwell Markham is a professional wrestler who competed using the nom de guerre of Grizzly. His violent actions bring him to the attention of J. Jonah Jameson, whose news coverage results in Markham being expelled from wrestling. Ten years later, Markham meets with the Jackal, who gives him a bear-themed suit and an exoskeleton harness that amplify his strength and durability. Markham uses this harness to attack the Daily Bugle in an attempt to get revenge against Jameson for ruining his wrestling career, but Spider-Man defeats him.

Grizzly allies with Gibbon, Spot, and Kangaroo to become the Legion of Losers. Planning only to get back at Spider-Man, Grizzly and Gibbon are shocked to see Kangaroo and Spot robbing a bank. They succeed in capturing Spider-Man, but release him, claiming that "He's an all-right guy". Grizzly and Gibbon later become crime-fighters and help Spider-Man stop White Rabbit's bank robbery.

Norman Osborn appoints Grizzly to the Thunderbolts, sending him on a mission against the Agents of Atlas. During this time, Grizzly uses a coat that has a bear-shaped hood on it instead of his usual exoskeleton bear suit. Grizzly is also made the commander of a squadron of B.A.T.F.E. agents.

Grizzly travels to Miami and attacks Scott Lang, mistaking him for his enemy Eric O'Grady and unaware that O'Grady is dead. After the misunderstanding is cleared up, Lang offers Grizzly a job at the newly established Ant-Man Security Solutions.

=== Grizzly (Theodore Winchester) ===
Grizzly

Publication information
- Publisher: Marvel Comics
- First appearance: X-Force #8 (March 1992)
- Created by: Fabian Nicieza; Rob Liefeld

In-story information
- Alter ego: Theodore Wyatt Winchester
- Species: Human Mutant
- Team affiliations: Six Pack; Weapon P.R.I.M.E.
- Abilities: Superhuman strength, speed, stamina, senses and size Razor-sharp claws and fangs Use of conventional firearms

Theodore Winchester is one of the members of Cable's mercenary group originally named the Wild Pack. Grizzly participated in the Wild Pack's raid on a Hydra base ten years prior. (Note: As seen in flashback in X-Force #8.) Grizzly also participated in the Wild Pack's mission in Iran. Because of conflicts with Silver Sable's group of the same name, they later changed their name to Six Pack. During a mission for the arms dealer Tolliver, Six Pack fell apart.

Years later, G. W. Bridge recruits Grizzly into Weapon P.R.I.M.E., a group created to capture Cable. Weapon P.R.I.M.E. attacks Cable and his team, X-Force. Grizzly was defeated by Warpath, and the mission failed. Grizzly leaves Weapon P.R.I.M.E., then works with Domino in her search for X-Force.

Some time later, Grizzly becomes a serial killer under the mental control of Genesis, Cable's son. Domino investigates the deaths and confronts Grizzly. She is forced to kill him, but promises the dying Grizzly not to tell Cable about his actions.

Grizzly reappeared alive in Deadpool & Cable: Split Second.

== Powers and abilities ==
Ace Fester wore a grizzly bear suit that is lined with steel to protect him from bullets. He can use his paws to manipulate rifles.

The A.I.M version uses a laser pistol in combat.

Maxwell "Max" Markham wears an exoskeleton bear suit which grants him superhuman strength and durability, designed by Miles Warren and later modified by the Tinkerer. The Grizzly suit also has razor-sharp claws. As a former professional wrestler, he is adept in hand-to-hand combat.

Theodore Winchester is a mutant who possesses a bear-like body with superhuman physical abilities and powerful claws and fangs.

== Reception ==
Max Markham has been ranked in many lists noting him for his humorous or strange gimmick.

The Theodore Winchester action figure was ranked 12th in CBR's "The Most Obscure X-Men Action Figures Of The 1990s".

== Other versions ==
=== Age of Apocalypse ===
An alternate universe version of Theodore Winchester / Grizzly appears in Age of Apocalypse. This version is a mass murderer and servant of Apocalypse until he is killed by Forge.

=== Ultimate Marvel ===
An alternate universe version of Theodore Winchester / Grizzly appears in Ultimate X-Men. This version is a student of the Xavier Institute who can transform into a humanoid bear. Additionally, a future version of Winchester appears as a member of Six Pack.

=== 1872 ===
An alternate universe version of Maxwell Markham / Grizzly appears in the Secret Wars tie-in 1872. This version is a mercenary in the Valley of Doom, a domain of Battleworld.

== In other media ==
Theodore Winchester / Grizzly as he appears in X-Men Legends II: Rise of Apocalypse.

- The Maxwell Markham incarnation of Grizzly appears in Ultimate Spider-Man, voiced by John DiMaggio.
- An unnamed, original incarnation of Grizzly appears in a flashback in the Avengers Assemble episode "Yemandi", voiced by Trevor Devall.
- An unidentified, alternate universe-displaced incarnation of Grizzly makes a non-speaking cameo appearance in Spider-Man: Across the Spider-Verse as a prisoner of the Spider-Society.
- The Theodore Winchester incarnation of Grizzly appears as a boss in X-Men Legends II: Rise of Apocalypse, voiced by Keith Ferguson. This version works for Apocalypse.
