= Irene Merryweather =

- Irene Merryweather. Art by Reilly Brown.

Publication information
- Publisher: Marvel Comics
- First appearance: Cable #48 (Nov. 1997)
- Created by: James Robinson (writer); José Ladrönn (artist)

In-story information
- Alter ego: Irene Merryweather
- Team affiliations: Daily Bugle; Providence
- Supporting character of: Cable & Deadpool
- Notable aliases: Chronicler

Irene Merryweather, also known as the Chronicler, is a fictional character appearing in American comic books published by Marvel Comics. A former reporter, she now acts as a friend and confidante of Cable and was formerly his chief of staff at Providence before its destruction.

Irene Merryweather made her live-action film debut cameo in Deadpool 2 (2018), played by Sonia Sunger.

== Publication history ==
Irene Merryweather first appeared in Cable #48 (Nov. 1997) and was created by James Robinson and José Ladrönn.

== Fictional character biography ==
Irene always wanted to be a serious reporter working for the Daily Bugle, but she got stuck working for the tabloid The Inquiring Eye. When asked by her editor to investigate Sebastian Shaw and the Hellfire Club, Irene gets drawn into a conspiracy to kill Cable. Irene returns to her office, but finds her co-workers killed by Hellfire Club agents, who attempt to kill her. Cable appears and saves her. He tells Irene that he is from the future and hires Irene to be his chronicler. Cable wants Irene to write down his life so that other people may know about him and his missions, should he get killed. Irene accepts, but soon finds out that working with Cable is not easy; Cable leaves her behind in Switzerland, when he feels that his mission endangers her and she has to return to New York City on her own. Over the next few months, Irene and Cable become close friends, though she often disagrees with him and calls him on bad decisions. Working for Cable, she also is a witness to many incredible events and lands a job as a reporter for the Daily Bugle by writing about them. During this time, Irene investigates the history of the Hellfire Club and Sebastian Shaw offers her a place in the Hellfire Club in return for her silence. Irene refuses.

When Cable renames himself Soldier X and disappears, Irene starts to worry about him. Her work suffers as a result, but one year later she receives a message from him. He sends her his diaries and confides in her.

When he returns as Cable, she interviews the would-be mutant Messiah. She thinks Cable's power is getting to his head and calls him on it, even bringing a gun to her office to protect herself from him, should he go insane. When Cable secretly uses a virus to turn everybody on Earth pink, only to publicly restore them later to normal, he is lauded as a hero. Irene is fired though for bringing a gun to work. Without a job, Irene moves to Providence, an island-state created by Cable to be a utopia. She takes over administrative duties in the city and basically runs the whole city when Cable is on his missions. Irene even learns to put up with Deadpool, Cable's new associate, who often expresses a romantic interest in her. She doesn't return his feelings, seeing Deadpool as an idiot.

After the destruction of Providence by the Hecatomb, she is attacked by Sabretooth within the ruins of the island but is rescued by the timely intervention of Deadpool, leaving the island before it detonates. She later reappears in the final issue of Cable and Deadpool during a symbiote-dinosaur attack on New York.

Cable's evil clone Stryfe later forces Deadpool to murder Irene when he threatens the lives of Wade's family.

Irene is rescued from this by Cable, who performs extensive time travel. She now has a job working for a news-based website.

== In other media ==
Irene Merryweather makes a cameo appearance in Deadpool 2, portrayed by an uncredited Sonia Sunger.
