= Solo (Marvel Comics) =

Marvel Comics fictional character

Publication information
- Publisher: Marvel Comics
- First appearance: Web of Spider-Man #19 (October 1986)
- Created by: David Michelinie (writer); Marc Silvestri (artist)

In-story information
- Alter ego: James Bourne
- Team affiliations: Six Pack; Omega Strike; Heroes for Hire; Mercs for Money; Force Works
- Abilities: Master hand to hand combatant Expert marksman Gifted intellect Limited teleportation Wears a bullet-proof quilted Kevlar armor Use of conventional weapons and firearms

James Bourne, also known as Solo, is a character, appearing in American comic books published by Marvel Comics. The character first appeared in Web of Spider-Man #19 in October 1986 and was created by writer David Michelinie and artist Marc Silvestri.

A former citizen of the United States who renounced his citizenship, Solo works as a bodyguard and counter-terrorism operative. He is a master hand-to-hand combatant and expert marksman, and utilises a range of conventional weapons, although he also possesses limited teleportation abilities, allowing him to "jump" from place to place for short distances. He is known for his catchphrase, "While Solo lives, terror dies!"

== Publication history ==
Solo first appeared in Web of Spider-Man #19 (October 1986). He was created by writer David Michelinie and artist Marc Silvestri.

Solo has had his own self-titled 4-issue limited series in 1994, which guest-starred Spider-Man.

After appearing in Deadpool and the Mercs for Money, he was given a second 5-issue limited series in 2016.

== Fictional character biography ==
Solo is a counter-terrorism operative who was born in the United States, but renounced his citizenship to any country. In his first appearance, Solo teleports inside a foreign embassy in West Germany and kills all the terrorists inside. He next foiled ULTIMATUM's plot to destroy the Arc de Triomphe in Paris.

When the Sinister Six reform and defeat both Spider-Man and the Hulk, Solo aids the web-slinger in his second fight against the super villain team. Mysterio uses an illusion to make Solo believe he is attacking the Six, when in reality he is attacking Spider-Man while the Six escape. Solo escapes and Spider-Man is rescued by Cyborg X and Deathlok. Soon after, Solo rejoins Spider-Man to aid him in a final assault on the Six aided by the Hulk, Ghost Rider, Sleepwalker, Nova, Deathlok, and the Fantastic Four. With the villains defeated, Solo disappears.

Later, Solo assists dozens of other heroes in battling a seemingly rampaging Wolverine (he was being mentally influenced). He confronts Wolverine, side-by-side with Cardiac. Solo is swiftly defeated, suffering deep lacerations in the process. Cardiac is subdued by falling masonry.

Solo is hired by G. W. Bridge to join the new Six Pack alongside Hammer, Domino, Anaconda, and Constrictor in their mission to take down Cable. Like Bridge and Hammer, Solo is captured and placed in suspended animation. He is eventually released.

During the "Civil War" storyline, Solo sides with other heroes who oppose registration, including Battlestar and Typeface. While waiting to make contact with the resistance led by Captain America, Solo and the others are arrested by Iron Man, Ms. Marvel, Wonder Man and S.H.I.E.L.D. agents.

During the "Dark Reign" storyline, Kingmaker hires Solo to capture his son Bullseye. Bullseye throws a shard of glass into Solo's left eye, but Solo survives and manages to capture Bullseye after tasering him. A group of assassins who are chasing Elektra unsuccessfully attempt to hire Solo to assist them.

Following the eight month ellipsis after the "Secret Wars" storyline, Solo is seen as part of Deadpool's new Mercs for Money. He attempts to steal a classified drive in Seoul and ends up in a fight with White Fox. Solo takes a specific interest in Deadpool's morality, such as when he urges him to destroy a robot whose knowledge of the future threatens innocent lives.

During the "Iron Man 2020" storyline, Solo appears as a member of Force Works. During a raid on a robot hideout, one of the robots self-destructs after being cornered by War Machine and Gauntlet. Maria Hill states to War Machine that Solo quit because he felt that War Machine was not teammate material.

== Powers and abilities ==
Solo has limited teleportation abilities, allowing him to "jump" from place to place for short distances. There appears to be a limit to the distance and the amount of time between Solo's teleports. He has a gifted intellect, and is a master of many forms of hand-to-hand combat. He is highly adept in the use of conventional weapons and firearms and is an expert marksman.

=== Equipment ===
Solo wears bullet-proof quilted Kevlar with pouches to hold weapons and ammunition. He carries an arsenal of portable conventional weaponry, including sub-machine guns, automatic rifles, automatic pistols, hand grenades, combat knives, etc., and has been known to use climbing claws.

== Collected editions ==
Title	Material Collected	Published Date	ISBN
Solo: The One-Man War on Terror	Solo (vol. 2) #1-5	June 13, 2017	978-1302904807
