= Prester John (comics) =

Marvel Comics character

Publication information
- Publisher: Marvel Comics
- First appearance: Fantastic Four #54 (September 1966)
- Created by: Stan Lee (writer); Jack Kirby

In-story information
- Team affiliations: Providence
- Abilities: Concussive energy blasts and force fields via Stellar Rod (formerly Evil Eye of Avalon); Superhuman strength and durability via Stone of Power

Prester John is a character appearing in American comic books published by Marvel Comics. The character is based loosely on the legendary Christian king Prester John.

Prester John first appeared in Fantastic Four #54 (September 1966). He has mostly appeared as a villain, opposing Thor and Deadpool as well as the Fantastic Four.

== Fictional character biography ==
Prester John is a centuries-old explorer who was born in an unnamed kingdom in Eastern Asia, which he once ruled. He has been a priest, king, adventurer, traveler, and explorer. He was an ally of King Richard the Lionheart and served in his court. John wields the Evil Eye of Avalon, a mystic object of power he acquired in the extra-dimensional land of Avalon which can project vast amounts of energy.

The alchemists of Avalon preserve John from the 12th century until the modern era using the Chair of Survival. When he awakes, John meets the Human Torch and Wyatt Wingfoot and witnesses the apparent destruction of the Evil Eye. John is later possessed by an alien power-stone and battles the Thing and Iron Man.

John later time-travels by unknown means back to the 12th century. There, he recovers the Evil Eye, which was reassembled in the present and brought to the past by the Defenders. It is later revealed that John was transported back in time following an encounter with Kang the Conqueror.

John is later allied with the would-be messiah Cable, serving as the "Head of Multi-Religious Studies" for the island nation of Providence.

An alternate universe version of John from Earth-11127 works with the Knights of Wundagore, claiming to be a harbinger of Nul, the Breaker of Worlds.

== Powers and abilities ==
Prester John is an athletic man with a gifted intellect, but no superhuman powers. He is an excellent swordsman and is proficient with most known weapons of 12th-century Europe and Asia. He has many years of experience as a priest, a king, a warrior, and an explorer. He wears a special suit of medieval body armor. He is usually armed with a sword and a staff.

Prester John has occasionally wielded the Evil Eye of Avalon, an object of mystical power capable of projecting bolts of concussive force, disintegrating matter, and creating force fields. He has also used the Chair of Survival, a device that preserves him in suspended animation. John once briefly possessed superhuman strength and durability conferred upon him while he was possessed by an alien power-stone, the Stone of Power. Once freed from its influence, his abilities returned to normal.
