= Garrison Kane =

- Garrison Kane as depicted in X-Force #11 (June 1992). Art by Mark Pacella (penciler), Dan Panosian (inker), and Steve Buccellato (colorist).

Publication information
- Publisher: Marvel Comics
- First appearance: X-Force #2 (Sept. 1991)
- Created by: Fabian Nicieza (writer); Rob Liefeld (artist)

In-story information
- Alter ego: Garrison Kane
- Team affiliations: Weapon X Six Pack; Weapon P.R.I.M.E. Department K Clan Chosen; Advanced Idea Mechanics
- Notable aliases: Weapon X
- Abilities: Ability to transform weapons attached on body armor Ability to access all recorded mutant powers and use them

Garrison Kane, also known as Weapon X and Kane, is a character appearing in American comic books published by Marvel Comics. Garrison Kane was created by Fabian Nicieza and Rob Liefeld, debuting in X-Force #2 (September 1991).

Kane is a cyborg created by the Weapon X program, and is often associated with X-Force and related characters. His cybernetic enhancements give him a range of abilities, including superhuman strength and the ability to create weaponry.

== Publication history ==
Kane was created by Fabian Nicieza and Rob Liefeld, and debuted in X-Force #2 (September 1991). He appeared in Cable #1-4; 37-39, Deadpool: The Circle Chase, Wolverine (Vol. 2), and Weapon X (Vol. 2), in which he died in issue #12. He also appeared in Deadpool: Bad Blood.

== Fictional character biography ==
Kane is a former member of Cable's mercenary team Six Pack. During a mission in Iran, the team is ambushed by Stryfe, a clone of Cable. Prevented from rescuing the entire team, Cable flees through time, leaving his friends behind. In the ensuing destruction, Kane loses his arms and legs. The Weapon X program transforms Kane into a cyborg, grafting cybernetic arms in place of his real ones.

Kane is loaned to the Canadian government's Department K to work as a covert operative. Kane battles Deadpool and is tasked with capturing Cable. To this end, he forms the group Weapon P.R.I.M.E., believing Cable and Stryfe to be the same person. After learning the truth about Stryfe, Kane battles him and the Mutant Liberation Front in Mexico. Cable brings Kane to the 40th century, where he is given new bionic arms and weaponry.

After returning to the 20th century, Kane rejoins Six Pack, but eventually retires from mercenary work. He is later seen working for Advanced Idea Mechanics, during which he battles Wolverine and Alpha Flight. Kane starts a romantic relationship with Copycat, with both working in a community theater.

Kane later rejoins Weapon X and has his cybernetic parts upgraded, giving him the ability to replicate the abilities of Weapon X's members. Kane confronts Madison Jeffries, a former member of Alpha Flight who was brainwashed into working for Weapon X leader Malcolm Colcord. Kane copies Jeffries's technopathic abilities to shut down his army of Box robots, dying in the process.

== Powers and abilities ==
Kane originally had a pair of cybernetic arms which provided him with superhuman strength. After he was sent to Cable's 40th Century alternate future his bionics were modified so that he gained new cybernetic appendages, which included synthetic-organic liquid metal arms, hands, and shoulders. The left and right sides of his torso have also been replaced by synthetic-organic metal parts, although the middle section is still organic. Ordinarily the metal parts of his body appear as flesh, but he can cause the metal to appear by willing a "synthorg transfer". Kane also has bionic legs and a bionic left eye. Kane's artificial hands are detachable and can be shot from his arms. He can also fire plasma from his metal arms. The arms can also produce large organic metal shields for protection. He can see in the infrared portion of the spectrum and project holograms from his eyes. His bionic parts contain a wide variety of devices, most of which have yet to be identified. He can generate electricity from his metal parts to shock an assailant. His bionic parts are self-repairing.

Due to the enhancements that the newest incarnation of Weapon X has given him, Kane gained numerous bionic appendages which house various weapons. He now has the ability to see in various spectra of light, project holograms, and he has a computerized targeting system. His strength was also upgraded and he is now more resistant to damage. He could download super powers such as toxic emissions, metal control, and various other abilities.

Kane is an excellent hand-to-hand combatant, highly trained in armed and unarmed combat. He has extensive knowledge of the 40th century A.D. of the alternate future in which Cable was based. Kane formerly used various firearms, but now mainly relies on the weapons installed in his bionic body parts, as well as an "ion blade" that generates destructive energy.

== Other versions ==
=== Exiles ===
An alternate universe version of Garrison Kane appears in Exiles, where he is forced to join the eponymous group to repair broken realities. He is later killed by a version of Vision, with Namor taking his spot in the Exiles.

=== Others ===
Alternate universe versions of Garrison Kane appear in House of M, and Ultimate X-Men.

== In other media ==
=== Television ===
- Garrison Kane appears in X-Men: The Animated Series. This version is a member of Cable's resistance group against Apocalypse.
  - Kane appears in the X-Men '97 episode "Weapon X, Lies and DVDs", voiced by Ben Pronsky. He is depicted as a member of Team X until he is killed in a helicopter accident.

=== Merchandise ===
- Two action figures of Garrison Kane were produced by Toy Biz as part of their X-Force line. The first Kane debuted in the 1992 debut X-Force set and was packaged with a gun accessory and a snap-back hand, while the second Kane debuted in the 1993 X-Force set and was packaged with a removable vest, another gun accessory, and a propeller shield fist.
- Garrison Kane appears as a playable character in HeroClix.

== Reception ==
CBR ranked Garrison Kane 3rd in "10 Most Powerful Canadian Marvel Heroes, Ranked", and as a success for the Weapon X program.

== See also ==
- Cyber (Marvel Comics), alias Silas Burr, an enemy of Wolverine with similar metal arms
