= Domino (character) =

Marvel comics character

- Domino as seen on the variant cover of Domino #1 (April 2018); Art by Rob Liefeld

Publication information
- Publisher: Marvel Comics
- First appearance: Impersonated by Copycat: The New Mutants #98 (February 1991); Herself: Cameo: X-Force #8 (March 1992); Full appearance: X-Force #11 (June 1992)
- Created by: Fabian Nicieza; Rob Liefeld

In-story information
- Alter ego: Neena Thurman
- Species: Human mutant
- Team affiliations: X-Men; X-Force; The 198; X-Corporation; Underground; Six Pack; Weapon X; Weapon X-Force
- Partnerships: Cable; Deadpool
- Notable aliases: Neena Beatrice Thurman; Beatrice Thurman; Samantha Wu; Tamara Winter; Elena Vladescu; Jessica Marie Costello; Luisa Mendoza; Christina Elizabeth Alioso; Priscilla Sutherland; Hope Eldridge
- Abilities: Subconscious telekinetic probability manipulation; Enhanced reflexes and agility; Expert martial artist; Expert markswoman

Domino (Neena Thurman) is a character appearing in American comic books published by Marvel Comics. The character is best known as a member of the mutant team X-Force. Created by writer Fabian Nicieza and artist/co-writer Rob Liefeld, Domino made her first full cover story appearance in X-Force #8 (March 1992) as an original member of the Wild Pack team led by the mutant Cable.

In addition to her exceptional marksmanship and hand-to-hand skills, Domino possesses mutant probability-altering powers. She often uses her skills as a mercenary, but has also been the partner, confidante, and love interest of the superhero Cable, a lieutenant in his militant group X-Force, and a member of the X-Men.

Domino was portrayed by Zazie Beetz in Deadpool 2 (2018). She has also appeared in video games and minor animated television appearances.

== Creation ==
Liefeld spoke on the conception of the character stating "I was obsessed with the game dominoes. And I always thought that a character who was 100% black and white would be a tremendous visual. So when the time came for New Mutants #98 I got the full reigns [sic] and I'm writing and drawing the book I had Deadpool, Domino, and Gideon.... 'What's up with the luck power?' I told him that when you play dominoes, it's a game of chance. When I pitched it to my editors they said, 'Yeah, go with that. That's good.'

== Publication history ==
Apart from being a mainstay character in the first series of X-Force, Domino has had two limited self-titled series, one of which had her teaming with Puck against Lady Deathstrike and Donald Pierce. The second revealed her childhood.

The first female Domino to appear in Marvel comics was not the genuine Neena Thurman. A Domino imposter, a mutant shapeshifter named Copycat, first appeared in The New Mutants #98 (Feb. 1991), and continued to assume Neena's role in X-Force for a time. The real Domino was first published in the main flashback story recalled by Cable in X-Force #8 (March 1992). Her current narrative, brief cameo, second appearance was published on the last page of X-Force #11 (June 1992).

Domino received two self-titled limited series. The first came in 1997 and ran for 3 issues. The next ran for four issues in 2003. She has also appeared in a number of issues of Cable & Deadpool (Marvel, 2004/2006 series), and joined the first Wolverine-led X-Force as of X-Force vol. 3 #8 (Dec. 2008).

Domino appeared in her own three-issue miniseries with Wolverine entitled X-Force: Sex and Violence, written by Christopher Yost and Craig Kyle and drawn by Gabriele Dell'Otto. The story centers upon Domino and Wolverine's mission to resolve a situation from Domino's recent past. Chris Yost has said, "It's a chance for us to go in-depth into a couple of the characters. In the story, Domino has a hit put out on her and Wolverine finds out about it. Essentially, it's the two of them going out to get that hit removed." Yost adds that the characters are up against the worst killers on the planet.

Domino was part of the main roster in Cable and X-Force (by Dennis Hopeless and Salvador Larroca), from 2012 to 2014. She guest starred in the 2014 X-Force, beginning in issue #7.

Domino starred in her own series again starting in 2018, which led into a limited series in 2019 titled Domino: Hotshots where she leads an all-female team. These were written by Gail Simone and drawn by David Baldeon.

== Fictional character biography ==
Domino gained her powers from a top-secret government breeding program intended to develop the perfect weapon. Domino was the only test subject to survive, but her "luck" power was deemed a failure at meeting the project's goals. Her biological mother broke her out of the project and left her with Father Rudolpho Boschelli in the Church of the Sacred Heart in Chicago.

Domino eventually left the Church and became a mercenary. One of her first jobs was to stop "Operation: Jericho" which was a remote-controlled warbot project. Domino wrecked the robot, but in the process fried the mind of the soldier controlling it. She was then assigned to guard the hard working and innovative Dr. Milo Thurman, whose analytical ability made him too dangerous for the government to let roam free. Somehow, Domino and Thurman fell in love and were married. The two separated after a raid on the facility by AIM members, with Milo believing Domino had been killed during the altercation.

=== Six Pack ===
Domino helped found the mercenary band Six Pack, which introduced her to the mutant time-traveler Cable. Domino worked with the Six Pack for some time, taking on many missions for cash. The Six Pack was very brutal in their adventures, often shooting down entire crowds of people who got in their way. The team, also known as the Wild Pack, went on missions in Iran, and participated in a raid on a Hydra base, which Domino participated in. During her time with the Wild Pack, she had her first confrontations with Stryfe (Cable's evil clone) in Afghanistan and Uruguay.

=== Replacement ===
When Cable became the leader of the New Mutants following their break from the X-Men, a mutant named Copycat impersonated Domino and joined as his field leader and stayed with the team as they changed from the New Mutants to X-Force. When it was revealed that the real Domino was actually a prisoner of the supervillain Tolliver for over a year, X-Force rejected Domino's imposter and, with Cable's reassurances, planned to rescue the real Domino and welcome her onto the team.

Meanwhile, the real Domino learned of Tolliver's destruction of X-Force's Adirondack base. Cable dragged Copycat along and found her at Tolliver's Italian home, where Copycat was stabbed from behind by her ex-boyfriend Deadpool. Domino was freed during the fight, shooting Deadpool herself. Cable sent her to find X-Force. She escaped on Tolliver's helicopter and survived a fall from Tolliver's helicopter into the sea. She found X-Force and joined the team.

=== Joining X-Force ===
Domino stayed with the team for most of its existence, becoming its de facto leader when Cable left the team on several occasions. For a while, she was a prisoner of the forces of Bastion, which severely affected her mentally and physically. During X-Force's existence, Domino had several solo adventures. During one, she was forced to kill her mentally ill, ex–Six Pack partner Grizzly.

=== X-Corporation ===
When X-Force briefly disbanded, Domino joined the X-Corporation. While working in their Hong Kong branch, Domino's partner, Risque, was murdered and she summoned the core group of the X-Men to help investigate. Together the mutants uncovered the truth behind Sublime's "Third Species" movement: he was harvesting body parts from living mutants to create his U-Men. They also helped free the mutant named Xorn.

During her solo period, Domino began to search for her mother, Beatrice, and clues to her past. In her search, Domino learned that the "Project: Armageddon", was still active. Led to a secret base in Florida, Domino finds a mutant boy named Lazarus who had the same eye tattoo. Lazarus imprisoned Domino there for observation. Lazarus turns out to be her half-brother with powerful emotion controlling abilities and the true result of the Perfect Weapon program. Soon after attempting to liberate him, a fanatical group of quasi-priests called the Armajesuits, who were against the project, arrive to kill Lazarus and prevent him from reaching his full development. Domino discovers that her mother leads the Armajesuits and is forced to shoot her to save Lazarus's life. She takes Lazarus to Father Boschelli and the Church she was raised in for sanctuary, although unbeknown to her, Beatrice subsequently abducts Lazarus from there.

=== Cable and Deadpool ===
Later, she was employed by S.H.I.E.L.D. as a member of the new Six Pack. Alongside G. W. Bridge, Hammer, Solo, Anaconda, and Constrictor, she attacked Cable at his community Providence, but she quickly defected to his side after the Six Pack was defeated by Cable and Deadpool. Domino followed Deadpool to Rumekistan, where she assassinated the country's dictator, Flag-Smasher, only to find out it was part of a plan to install Cable as leader of that nation. After a conversation with Citizen V, she then attempted to kill Cable, believing that he would lead them to ruin.

=== "Civil War" ===
During the 2006 "Civil War" storyline, Domino, Shatterstar, and Caliban, under the X-Force name, led an attack on the Xavier Institute and broke out more than half of the 198, bringing the tension between the 198 and O*N*E to a head. After her other team, the Six Pack disbands, she and Cable are allies on Providence, until a fight with Hecatomb causes the island to sink into the ocean, leaving Cable presumed dead.

Domino is later recruited by G. W. Bridge along with Silver Sable and Valentina Allegra de Fontaine to track down the Punisher. When a fake Punisher started targeting civilians, she was the only team member to believe in Castle's innocence.

Domino in X-Force vol. 3 #8 (Dec. 2008); art by Mike Choi

=== X-Force ===
After the Punisher stint, Domino finds Wolverine and X-Force in Tokyo and joins them in trying to capture Vanisher. Questions to Domino's authenticity have been raised when her luck powers fail her several times.

On behalf of Wolverine, Domino is asked to stop in a cemetery to deliver flowers to a deceased loved one. She encounters Spiral, Chimera, and Lady Deathstrike who have dug up Revanche's body. After a brief fight, she wounds Chimera and the women escape with the body, but Domino manages to replace Jean Grey's body before the Red Queen could take it as a host.

Domino and Wolverine go on a mission to resolve a situation from Domino's past.

=== 2010 – present ===
Domino is the first person to learn Red Hulk's identity and is marked for death. Doc Samson provides Red Hulk with a list of people (Deadpool, the Punisher, Thundra, and Elektra) to kill her. When the group arrives, they find her in a bar with the members of X-Force. Afterwards, she reveals it was her husband who named her Domino.

Domino appears post-"Regenesis" as a regular member of Storm's security team, tasked with the responsibility of safeguarding Utopia from all foreign threats.. She fights with them during the war against the Avengers.

After the events of the 2012 "Avengers vs. X-Men" storyline, Domino left Utopia like all the mutants who lived there. She later joins Cable's new X-Force group.

In the 2016 Marvel NOW! branding, Domino forms a second incarnation of the Mercs for Money alongside Gorilla-Man, Machine Man, and Masacre. When they arrive to help Deadpool in freeing Negasonic Teenage Warhead from Umbral Dynamics, Domino states to Deadpool that they arrived to help and that she is the group's leader.

Domino appears as a target for the newly revamped Weapon X Program and is opted to join Old Man Logan's new team.

For the "Dawn of X" relaunch, she joins the new X-Force team, which now operates as an intelligence agency for Krakoa.

== Powers and abilities ==
Domino is a mutant with the ability to subconsciously generate a "psionic aura" that alters the probabilities of events and actions within her line of sight. The aura causes improbable (but not impossible) outcomes that are personally beneficial. The resulting effects of this "subliminal telekinesis" are observed as "good luck" for Domino and "bad luck" for her opponents (from enemy equipment serendipitously malfunctioning to averting imminent catastrophes through seemingly chance actions).

Instead of being consciously activated, her probability-warping powers trigger automatically when Domino faces potential harm, danger, or personal benefit (e.g. engaging in games of chance). The psionic aura benefits and protects Domino even when she isn't consciously aware that danger is present.

Domino must be engaging in an action with multiple possible outcomes for her power to manifest: it will not trigger if she is inactive. Engaging in any action that her power can influence causes Domino's cerebral cortex to emit bio electrical pulses that guide her movements, enhancing her reflexes and agility to near-superhuman levels.

Domino is highly trained as a weapons expert and marksman; a superb athlete and swimmer; martial artist and hand-to-hand combatant; and an accomplished linguist.

== Reception ==
=== Critical reception ===
Chris Condry of Looper referred to Domino as "potentially the greatest gunslinger in history," saying, "Maybe the number one reason Domino deserves more love is that she is one of the only characters in comics history who allows for a complete suspension of disbelief with her every action. Domino, to whom anything is possible, is a writer's — and therefore a reader's –- dream come true." Rosie Knight of Nerdist called Domino "Marvel's luckiest lady," writing, "Comics offer us up a smorgasbord of cool characters, and sometimes it's hard to keep up with all of them. [...] Domino is a radical female character who has a surprisingly prestigious selection of creators in her back catalogue." Chase Magnett of ComicBook.com described Domino as a "very important name for fans of Marvel Comics," asserting, "Domino is a character that is packed with a lot more potential than her series and film appearances thus far seem to indicate. [...] Domino is one of the greats from X-Force history and is long overdue for some serious recognition in comics and movies." Jim Dandeneau of Den of Geek stated, "She's a ton of fun as a character. Someone who's lucky all the time and knows it can get into some crazy stuff. Making her a mercenary just leans into the slapstick violence you can pull off with her. And when you pair her with a fourth wall breaker like Deadpool, narrative convenience becomes an end goal of its own." Darby Harn of CBR.com wrote, "Domino is one of the luckiest people around, and that's not only to do with her probability-altering powers. This member of the New Mutants and very quickly X-Force thereafter got in on the ground floor of the huge boom in popularity of the world of the X-Men in the early 90s. She quickly became a hallmark character."

=== Accolades ===
In 2009, IGN included Domino in their "Marvel's Femme Fatales" list. In 2015, Entertainment Weekly ranked Domino 36th in their "Let's rank every X-Man ever" list. Various online articles have assessed Domino as among the most powerful members of X-Force, with a 2022 Looper article listing her as underrated.

== Literary reception ==
=== Volumes ===
==== Domino - 2018 ====
According to Diamond Comic Distributors, Domino #1 was the 8th best selling comic in April 2018.

Joshua Davison of Bleeding Cool called Domino #1 a "thoughtful, endearing, and thoroughly entertaining book about a badass anti-heroine," writing, "Domino #1 is a wonderful comic with a lot of heart and fun at its core. Simone once more shows how she is one of the greatest writers in the business, and David Baldeon brings his distinct style to make the comic look great. This one is highly recommended." Jesse Schedeen of IGN gave Domino #1 a grade of 7.8 out of 10, saying, "If you've been waiting for Domino to branch out on her own, this new series won't disappoint. It delivers some wacky good fun and stylish visuals while also making it plain that being a super-lucky assassin isn't all it's cracked up to be. While there are some nagging storytelling flaws in this first issue, it's clear that Neena Thurman is in good hands."

==== Domino: Hotshots - 2019 ====
According to Diamond Comic Distributors, Domino: Hotshots #1 was the 43rd best selling comic book in March 2019. The Domino: Hotshots trade paper back was the 71st best selling graphic novel in September 2019.

Rollin Bishop of ComicBook.com gave Domino: Hotshots #1 a grade of 4 out of 5, asserting, "Whereas Domino's previous outing ended as a muddled mess, this new miniseries picks up the pieces and orients them towards a new, Celestial threat with a capital "C" that gets things back in order swiftly. The initial setting of the stage is a little awkward, but the actual story here has meat on its bones, and I'm genuinely excited to see what happens next." Melody MacReady of Screen Rant ranked the Domino: Hotshots comic book series 8th in their "Gail Simone's 10 Best Comics" list, writing, "Domino: Hotshots sees the mutant Domino creating her own team of female heroes and anti-heroes known as the Hotshots. This team features the Natasha Romanoff version of Black Widow, White Fox, Outlaw, Diamondback, and Atlas Bear. These drastically different characters who tend to operate solo now working together lead to comedic antics that will make any reader grin. However, their combined skills and ability make for unique action as they are caught between two warring nations. As a bonus, most of these characters are not household names thus making it far from the typical superhero team."

== Other characters named Domino ==
A male character named Domino (Dominic Dunsinane) aided the Scourge of the Underworld as an informant. He was killed by a rogue Scourge agent named Bloodstain in U.S. Agent #4 (Sept. 1993) (Marvel Comics).

== Other versions ==
=== Age of Apocalypse ===
An alternate universe version of Domino appears in "Age of Apocalypse". This version is a sadistic bounty hunter working for Apocalypse. She is hired to kill Nate Grey, who kills her by exposing her to all the suffering she had caused and destroying her mind.

=== Earth X ===
An alternate universe version of Domino appears in Mutant X as a member of X-Force.

=== X-Force ===
An alternate universe version of Domino appears in X-Force. This version is also known as Stryfe. After arriving on Earth-616, she becomes a member of the Mutant Liberation Front.

=== Ultimate Marvel ===
An alternate universe version of Domino appears in the Ultimate Marvel imprint as a member of Cable's team.

=== X-Men: The End ===
An alternate universe version of Domino appears in X-Men: The End. This version is one of the few survivors of brutal attack directed against X-Force. She is later ambushed by a Super-Skrull posing as Wolverine, who kills her by impaling her through the chest.

== In other media ==
=== Television ===
- Domino appears in X-Men: The Animated Series, voiced by Jennifer Dale.
- Domino appears in Wolverine and the X-Men, voiced by Gwendoline Yeo. This version is a member of the Brotherhood of Mutants and friend of teammate Rogue in the present, and a potential future version from a Sentinel-controlled timeline appears as a member of Professor X's X-Men.

=== Film ===
Zazie Beetz as Domino in a promotional image for Deadpool 2.

Domino appears in Deadpool 2, portrayed by Zazie Beetz. This version is a member of X-Force.

=== Video games ===
- Domino makes a cameo appearance in Deadpool's ending in Ultimate Marvel vs. Capcom 3.
- Domino appears in Deadpool, voiced again by Gwendoline Yeo. This version is a member of the X-Men.
- Domino appears as a team-up character in Marvel Heroes, voiced by Vanessa Marshall.
- Domino appears as a playable character in Marvel: Avengers Alliance.
- Domino appears as a playable character in Marvel: Contest of Champions.
- Domino appears as a playable character in Marvel Future Fight.
- Domino appears as a playable character in Marvel Puzzle Quest.
- Domino appears as a purchasable outfit in Fortnite Battle Royale.
- Domino appears in Marvel Snap.

=== Miscellaneous ===
Domino appears in the novel Domino: Strays, written by Tristan Palmgren and released by Aconyte Books.

== Collected editions ==
Stories featuring Domino have been collected into several trade paperback editions.

Title	Material collected	Pages	Publication date	ISBN
X-Men: Domino	Domino (vol. 1) #1-3, Domino (vol. 2) #1-4, X-Force: Sex & Violence #1-3; material from X-Force & Cable Annual '95, A+X #10, Uncanny X-Men Annual #1	288	April 24, 2018	978-1302912260
Domino Vol. 1: Killer Instinct	Domino (vol. 3) #1-5	112	November 20, 2018	978-1302912987
Domino Vol. 2: Soldier of Fortune	Domino (vol. 3) #7-10 and Domino Annual #1	128	March 26, 2019	978-1302914844
Domino: Hotshots	Domino: Hotshots #1-5	112	September 24, 2019	978-1302918330
