= Six Pack (comics) =

Fictional comic book group

Publication information
- Publisher: Marvel Comics
- First appearance: X-Force #8 (March 1992)
- Created by: Fabian Nicieza (writer); Rob Liefeld (Writer, artist)

In-story information
- Member(s): G. W. Bridge; Hammer; Domino; Anaconda; Solo; Deadpool Notable former members Cable; Garrison Kane; Grizzly; Constrictor

The Six Pack is a team of fictional characters appearing in American comic books published by Marvel Comics. The original team debuted in X-Force #8 (March 1992), created by Fabian Nicieza and Rob Liefeld.

== Team biography ==
When Stryfe travels to the present, Cable follows him with the aim of stopping Stryfe's nefarious plans as well as preventing Apocalypse's rise to power. Cable forms a group initially called the Wild Pack, but conflict with Silver Sable (who already had a group called the Wild Pack) forces him to change the name to the Six Pack. Cable travels between the present and his future with his ship Graymalkin, which contained a sentient computer program called Professor (the future version of the program built into X-Factor's ship).

The Six Pack performs many brutal missions, often with a high body count. Later, they are hired by Mr. Tolliver, which puts them in direct conflict with Stryfe. In their last mission, Cable and the Pack confront Stryfe, who gains the upper hand. Hammer decides to surrender vital information to Stryfe, forcing Cable to shoot him in the back. Cable escapes via time-travel, unable to take his friends along. They escape themselves but Hammer ends up paralyzed and Garrison Kane loses both of his arms.

Kane is granted robotic arms by the Weapon X program. G.W. Bridge, an agent of S.H.I.E.L.D., now acts as liaison to Weapon X. Kane undertakes a mission to destroy Cable and the two battle until circumstances bring them together to battle Stryfe once again. Kane's arms are destroyed, and Cable uses his time-travel capabilities to take him to the far future. His arms are replaced with liquid metal versions.

Domino, Hammer, Kane, and Grizzly operate for some time on their own. In one incident, they battle and then team up with the vigilante Nomad.

Later, Grizzly goes mad and begins killing people. Domino, after a long battle, is forced to kill him.

The original Six Pack X-Force #8

=== Recent developments ===
Six Pack is reformed by S.H.I.E.L.D. under the leadership of G.W. Bridge for the purpose of attacking Cable. New members include Constrictor, a mercenary who once shared an apartment with Deadpool, Anaconda, who was formerly employed by the Serpent Society, and Solo, a vigilante bio-teleporter with a penchant for attacking terrorists. Rounding out the group is longtime Six Pack member, Hammer.

Following their failed attempt to defeat Cable, G.W. and Hammer are placed in suspended animation, while Domino is "converted" to Cable's side. Solo, Constrictor, and Anaconda join Cable in exchange for money. They are later sent to find Cable but are trapped in his mind, which is quickly fading away. However, they are all eventually saved by Deadpool and the Fixer and returned to their bodies.

Constrictor eventually abandoned the group, and was, unbeknownst to the reader, replaced by Deadpool. The Six Pack was hired by the American government to commit acts of terrorism against the fictional country of Rumekistan, being led at this point by Cable. The objective was to taint Cable's reputation so as to crumble his secure reign over the country. They did not succeed, however, as it was all seemingly a part of Cable's plan. Deadpool also seems to have left the group after their defeat at Cable's hands. The captured Six Pack members are returned to their respective countries by Rumekistan forces.

== Other versions ==
=== Ultimate Marvel ===
An alternate universe incarnation of the Six Pack appears in the Ultimate Marvel imprint, consisting of Cable, Domino, Hammer, Garrison Kane, Grizzly, and Bishop

== Hammer (Eisenhower Canty) ==
Hammer was an ally to the mutant Cable and a member of the Six Pack. He appeared in Cable & Deadpool as part of a new 'Six-Pack'. They are hired by the U.S. government as part of a public relations mission against Cable, who by that point was ruling two separate countries. Hammer assists in a raid against the fictional Rumekistan; the intent is to disrupt its recently modified electrical grid and discredit Cable.
