= Constrictor (character) =

Marvel Comics fictional character

- Constrictor. Art by Andrea Di Vito.

Publication information
- Publisher: Marvel Comics
- First appearance: The Incredible Hulk vol. 2 #212 (June 1977)
- Created by: Len Wein; John Romita Sr. Sal Buscema

In-story information
- Alter ego: Frank Payne
- Team affiliations: Corporation; Frightful Four; Masters of Evil; Initiative; Shadow Initiative; S.H.I.E.L.D. Sinister Syndicate; Six-Pack
- Notable aliases: Frank Schlicting
- Abilities: Skilled street fighter and unarmed combatant Wears cybernetic coils made of vibranium or adamantium Formerly: Possessed bionic arms with fingers that functioned like his old coils

Constrictor is the name of two characters appearing in American comic books published by Marvel Comics. The first version seen is Frank Payne. The second version is his unnamed son.

== Publication history ==
The Frank Payne version of Constrictor made his first appearance in The Incredible Hulk (vol. 2) #212 (1977) and was created by Len Wein and John Romita Sr., then drawn in his first issue by Sal Buscema.

The character went on to feature as a supervillain in Captain America #228-229, 231 (1978–1979), Iron Man #126-127 (1979), Power Man & Iron Fist #66 (1980), Captain America Annual #5 (1981), Power Man & Iron Fist #78, 84 (1982), Captain America #281-283 (1983), #309-311 (1985), Fantastic Four #334 (1989), Marvel Comics Presents #74, 86-87. 89-92 (1991), The New Warriors Annual #2 (1992), The Spectacular Spider-Man Annual #12 (1992), Web of Spider-Man Annual #8 (1992), Iron Man #284 (1992), Nick Fury: Agent of S.H.I.E.L.D. (vol. 3) #36 (1992), Marvel Comics Presents #119-120 (1993), Alpha Flight #121 (1993), Captain America #412 (1993), Sabretooth #1-3 (1994), Marvel Fanfare (vol. 2) #6 (1997), Thunderbolts #24-25 (1999), Gambit (vol. 3) #12 (1999), #16-19 (2000), Gambit Annual 2000 (2000), The Hood #2-4, 6 (2002), Agent X #6 (2003), Weapon X (vol. 2) #26, 28 (2004), Secret War #3-5 (2004–2005), Marvel Team-Up (vol. 3) #7 (2005) and She-Hulk #9 (2005).

Constrictor appeared as a supporting character in Deadpool #35 (1999), 38-45 (2000) and 61 (2002). The character went on to feature in Cable & Deadpool #7-12 (2004–2005) and The Thing (vol. 2) #1-3, 8 (2006) in a more heroic role. Constrictor later appeared as a member of the Initiative in Avengers: The Initiative #1, 4-5, 8, 10, 12-15, 17 (2007–2008) and featured prominently in #20-24, 26-35 (2009–2010) during the Dark Reign and Siege story lines.

== Fictional character biography ==
=== Frank Payne ===
Frank Payne was an agent of the international espionage organization S.H.I.E.L.D., and the father of an adult daughter, Mia. When S.H.I.E.L.D. needed a costumed "supervillain" to go undercover in the criminal organization called the Corporation, Payne was given a snake-themed costume and a pair of wrist-mounted electrified metal coils. Using the false identity of "Frank Schlicting" from Racine, Wisconsin, and the codename of "Constrictor", he infiltrated the group, only to suffer a nervous breakdown and become a career criminal in earnest. As a result of his defection, S.H.I.E.L.D. allowed his daughter to believe that he had died. Constrictor becomes an independent mercenary, criminal, and assassin after the dissolution of the Corporation.

Constrictor is invited to join the Serpent Society, but abandons the group after the first meeting. He subsequently tries to turn the Society over to the Avengers, but is attacked by Anaconda. While recuperating, Constrictor is nearly killed by the Scourge of the Underworld.

Constrictor joins the seventh incarnation of the Masters of Evil, led by the Crimson Cowl. During the Deadpool story arc, it was also revealed that Constrictor had been part of the Frightful Four.

After a severe beating from Hercules, Constrictor is awarded several million dollars in a lawsuit. Nighthawk convinces Constrictor that with all his money there was no need to be a criminal anymore, resulting in him reforming. He rejoins S.H.I.E.L.D. as a member of Six Pack.

Constrictor is one of the 142 registered superheroes who have registered as part of the Fifty State Initiative. Constrictor is also part of the Shadow Initiative, a black ops version of the Initiative under the command of Henry Peter Gyrich. After his hands are cut off by KIA, Constrictor is given bionic hands and a Purple Heart for his efforts.

Constrictor is recruited by Max Fury to join the Shadow Council's incarnation of the Masters of Evil.

Frank Payne later retires from crime and moves in with Rachel Leighton. After learning that Payne has an unspecified terminal illness, Rachael becomes Diamondback again and joins Serpent Solutions to get the money to help with his medical treatment. Despite her efforts, Payne ends up dying. His son became the second Constrictor. It is later revealed that Frank Payne faked his death and used the money from his lawsuit against Hercules to become a businessman and arms dealer.

=== Frank Payne's son ===
When Frank Payne had a brief relationship with Sandy and later left him, Sandy gave birth to a son who hated his father for his abandonment. After Payne died, he left his battlesuit for his son in his will and he became the new Constrictor. The son considered this as a way to get back at his late father.

Liwei hires Constrictor to break into Danny Rand's apartment and obtain the Book of the Iron Fist for Chosin. When Chosin refuses to pay Constrictor double and plans to have him tortured, Constrictor summons the Serpent Society. The fight is crashed by Iron Fist and Sabretooth. Constrictor is poisoned by Rat of 12 Plagues and hospitalized as Chosin takes the Book of the Iron Fist.

During the "Search for Tony Stark" arc, Constrictor joins the Hood's crime syndicate in attacking Castle Doom.

== Powers and abilities ==
Constrictor's primary weapon is a pair of cybernetically-controlled, electrified, prehensile, wrist-mounted metal coils provided by Justin Hammer. The coils eject and retract from special appliances running from shoulder to wrist. These cables are able to extend to a maximum length of 30 feet (9.1 m) and can be used as whips, capable of rending steel or lesser metals; or as bonds, capable of entwining an object or human being and constricting.

The previous sets of coils were made from an adamantium alloy, then from vibranium. The adamantium coils were traded to Gambit in exchange for a favor and are then subsequently used by Mister Sinister to reinforce an ailing Sabretooth's skeleton. The strength of the coils varies based on their construction, but the adamantium coils were powerful enough to lift and restrain the Hulk. The vibranium coils have a contact-based aura that suppresses sound.

Constrictor's costume is lightly armored with partial bulletproofing around the chest and head area and the entire costume is electrically insulated, covering his entire body except for his lower face and chin. Although Constrictor is a skilled unarmed combatant and street fighter, he usually uses his coils in a fight.

After his encounter with KIA, Constrictor is implanted with cybernetic arms, which replicate the abilities of his old coils.

== Other versions ==
=== House of M ===
An alternate universe version of Constrictor appears in House of M: Masters of Evil as a member of the Hood's Masters of Evil who is later killed by Sebastian Shaw.

=== What If? ===
Alternate universe versions of Constrictor makes minor appearances in the What If? storylines What If?: World War Hulk #1 (2010) and What If?: Secret Invasion #1 (2010).

== In other media ==
=== Television ===
The Frank Payne incarnation of Constrictor appears in The Avengers: Earth's Mightiest Heroes, initially voiced by Cam Clarke and later by Troy Baker. This version is a member of the Serpent Society.

=== Video games ===
The Frank Payne incarnation of Constrictor appears as a boss and unlockable playable character in Marvel: Avengers Alliance.

=== Merchandise ===
- A figure of Constrictor was released as an exclusive foreign release as part of Mattel's Secret Wars toyline.
- A figure of Constrictor was released in wave 11 of Hasbro's 3 3/4" Marvel Universe toyline.
- A figure of Constrictor was released in wave 1 of Hasbro's 6" Marvel Legends 2012 toyline.
