= Providence (comics) =

Providence, in comics, may refer to:

- Providence (Marvel Comics), a location in the Marvel Comics universe
- Providence (Avatar Press), a limited series written by Alan Moore

== See also ==
- Providence (disambiguation)
