= G. W. Bridge =

G.W. Bridge
- G. W. Bridge; Art by Ariel Olivetti.

Publication information
- Publisher: Marvel Comics
- First appearance: X-Force #1 (Aug. 1991)
- Created by: Fabian Nicieza (writer); Rob Liefeld (artist)

In-story information
- Alter ego: George Washington Bridge
- Team affiliations: Weapon P.R.I.M.E. S.H.I.E.L.D. J.A.N.U.S. Six Pack
- Abilities: Skilled in hand-to-hand combat and firearms; Skilled strategist

George Washington "G. W." Bridge is a character appearing in American comic books published by Marvel Comics. Created by writer Fabian Nicieza and artist Rob Liefeld, the character first appeared in X-Force #1 (August 1991). Bridge is a former mercenary and high-ranking agent of S.H.I.E.L.D., serving as an acting liaison on mutant affairs. He later became Director of Mutant Affairs and was associated with Weapon P.R.I.M.E. During the apparent death of Nick Fury, Bridge acted as the head of S.H.I.E.L.D. Over the course of his publication history, he has been a member of several teams, including Six Pack and J.A.N.U.S.

== Publication history ==
G.W. Bridge debuted in X-Force #1 (August 1991), created by Fabian Nicieza and Rob Liefeld. He subsequently appeared in several Marvel series, including Cable - Blood and Metal (1992), Cable (1993), and Ravencroft (2020).

== Fictional character biography ==
Little is known about George Washington Bridge's early youth. He prefers to call himself "G. W." to avoid any jokes about the actual George Washington Bridge. He later became a mercenary and joined a group of mercenaries gathered by Cable. Originally known as the Wild Pack, the group is renamed Six Pack to avoid confusion with the organization of the same name.

=== Joining S.H.I.E.L.D. ===
G. W. Bridge joins S.H.I.E.L.D., in which he attains the rank of commander. When Cable joins the New Mutants and rebrands the group as X-Force, S.H.I.E.L.D. asks Bridge to investigate the team. Working with the Canadian Department K, Bridge forms Weapon P.R.I.M.E., who all carry a grudge against Cable. Weapon P.R.I.M.E. attacks X-Force, but learns that Cable has left the team. Unwilling to fight his former teammates, Rictor rejoins X-Force; and the rest of the team soon falls apart. G. W. Bridge returns to S.H.I.E.L.D. and makes peace with Cable after a short fight.

=== Rejoining S.H.I.E.L.D. ===
G. W. Bridge returns to S.H.I.E.L.D. at the request of Jasper Sitwell, looking drastically different physically. He also has converted to Islam. He is contracted to take down Frank Castle, the Punisher. After failing to capture the Punisher, Bridge resigns from active S.H.I.E.L.D. status and is hired by Sitwell as an independent contractor.

The recently resurrected Death Adder and Basilisk hold Bridge's family hostage to make him tell them where they can find the Punisher. Bridge is then shot and killed by Microchip.

In the series Ravencroft, G. W. Bridge appears alive as a member of J.A.N.U.S.

== Powers and abilities ==
G. W. Bridge has no superhuman powers, but is trained in hand-to-hand combat, the use of firearms, and is a skilled strategist. As a high-ranking member of S.H.I.E.L.D., he has contacts worldwide and access to advanced technology and classified information.

== Other versions ==
An alternate version of G. W. Bridge appears in the MC2 imprint. In a possible future, Bridge has become President of the United States.

== In other media ==
G. W. Bridge makes a non-speaking cameo appearance in the X-Men: The Animated Series episode "Time Fugitives".
