= Porgy and Bess discography =

Porgy and Bess, the opera by George Gershwin, has been recorded by a variety of artists since it was completed in 1935, including renditions by jazz instrumentalists and vocalists, in addition to operatic treatments.

== Operatic and Broadway versions ==
- Highlights from Porgy and Bess (RCA 1935), recorded days after the premiere by popular white opera singers with Gershwin's approval.
- Mabel Mercer Sings, Cy Walter Plays, Selections from George Gershwin's Porgy And Bess (Liberty Music Shop 78 rpm album, 1942); Mabel Mercer sings three songs accompanied by Cy Walter, and Walter plays three solo songs. The album was reissued twice by AEI, as Cabin in the Sky/Porgy and Bess (AEI 1107, 1979 LP), and as Cabin in the Sky/Porgy and Bess/Carib Song (AEI-CD-17, 1995 CD), each with Walter's three songs combined as a single medley.
- Selections from George Gershwin's folk opera Porgy and Bess (Decca 1940 & 1942) Two sets of recorded selections with members of the original cast and the 1942 Broadway revival cast including Anne Brown, Todd Duncan and Avon Long. Later reissued as a single LP with the misleading label, "original cast recording".
- Porgy and Bess (RCA 1950), eight selections from the opera sung by Robert Merrill and Risë Stevens.
- Porgy and Bess (Columbia Masterworks 1951), the first recording of the full opera (after the customary cuts), with Lawrence Winters as Porgy and Camilla Williams as Bess.
- Porgy and Bess, (RCA 1963), a single disc of selections that brought back together the stars from the opera's world tour in the 1950s, Leontyne Price and William Warfield. Also included were the original Sportin' Life, John W. Bubbles, and McHenry Boatwright. Leontyne Price won a Grammy for her performance.
- Porgy and Bess (Decca/London 1976), an uncut complete studio production starring Willard White and Leona Mitchell with the Cleveland Orchestra conducted by Lorin Maazel. A Grammy Award winner.
- Another uncut Porgy and Bess (RCA) was recorded late in 1976 in studio sessions during a New York run of the Houston Grand Opera production, starring Donnie Ray Albert and Clamma Dale. It was the second truly complete recording of the opera and it won a Grammy, making Porgy and Bess one of the few operas to win this award two years in a row. It was issued on 3 CDs in 1987.
- Porgy and Bess (EMI 1989), an uncut complete studio recording of the Glyndebourne Festival Opera production, starring Willard White and Cynthia Haymon conducted by Simon Rattle. This recording served as the soundtrack of the acclaimed 1993 television production of the opera.
- Porgy and Bess (Decca 2006), the first recording of the score as Gershwin arranged it for the original 1935 Broadway production (incorporating all of Gershwin's opening night cuts). With Alvy Powell (Porgy), Marquita Lister (Bess), Nicole Cabell (Clara) and Robert Mack (Sportin' Life), with the Nashville Symphony Orchestra conducted by John Mauceri. Studio recording made in Nashville.
- Porgy and Bess (1952), a live recording, released in 2008, of a 1952 Hamburg Germany performance by the famous Davis/Breen touring company, starring Leontyne Price, William Warfield, and Cab Calloway. This is the only known recording from this production, and the first live recording of Porgy and Bess ever released.
- Porgy and Bess (RCA Red Seal/Sony Music), a live 2009 recording from the styriarte festival in Graz, Austria, with a cast led by bass Jonathan Lemalu, conducted by Nikolaus Harnoncourt. Harnoncourt reviewed Gershwin's cuts for the Broadway version and retained those that were for dramatic reasons, while restoring material that was cut to ease the strain on the singers' voices. He also recreated the "Symphony of Noise" to open the final scene.

== Jazz versions ==
- The Complete Porgy and Bess (1956), Mel Tormé and Frances Faye. The first recording of nearly the entire work using jazz singers and instrumentalists.
- Porgy and Bess (1957), Louis Armstrong and Ella Fitzgerald collaborated in another jazz interpretation of the opera
- Porgy and Bess (1958), Miles Davis and Gil Evans recorded their own jazz instrumental interpretation of the opera.
- Porgy and Bess (1959), Sammy Davis Jr. and Carmen McRae recorded their own jazz vocal interpretation of the opera.
- Oscar Peterson Plays Porgy & Bess (1959), Oscar Peterson recorded his instrumental interpretation of ten selections from the opera.
- Porgy and Bess (1959), Harry Belafonte and Lena Horne released an album of ten selections.
- The Jazz Soul of Porgy & Bess (1959), Bill Potts recorded his own big band interpretation of selections from the opera for United Artists.
- Porgy and Bess in Modern Jazz (1959), Ralph Burns recorded his own jazz instrumental interpretation of the opera for Decca.
- Porgy and Bess (1959) Diahann Carroll and the André Previn Trio recorded a version for United Artists Records.
- Porgy and Bess (1959), Hank Jones (on piano) recorded selections from the opera for Capitol.
- Porgy & Bess (1959), Mundell Lowe (on guitar) recorded selections from the opera for RCA Camden.
- Porgy and Bess Revisited (1959), Rex Stewart and Cootie Williams (on trumpet) recorded selections from the opera for Warner Bros. Records.
- Porgy & Bess (recorded 1957 released 1959), Buddy Collette (on flute and bass clarinet) recorded selections from the opera for Interlude. Also available as Pete Jolly Gasses Everybody for Charlie Parker Records.
- The Modern Jazz Quartet Plays George Gershwin's Porgy and Bess (1965), The Modern Jazz Quartet recorded their interpretation of seven instrumentals from the opera.
- Two Sides of Slide Hampton (1961), The Slide Hampton Octet recorded instrumental versions of five selections from "Porgy and Bess" on the second side of this album released on Charlie Parker Records.
- Porgy and Bess (1976), Oscar Peterson and Joe Pass recorded selections from the opera.
- Porgy and Bess (1976), Ray Charles and Cleo Laine recorded selections from the opera for RCA.
- Porgy and Bess (1997), Joe Henderson (on tenor saxophone) recorded selections from the opera for Verve.
- George Gershwin's Porgy & Bess (2003), Clark Terry with Jeff Lindberg and the Chicago Jazz Orchestra. An interpretation of the Gil Evans arrangements (transcribed by Lindberg) from the 1958 Miles Davis album (with a new arrangement of "I Loves You, Porgy" by Charles Harrison III).

== Film soundtrack version ==
- Porgy and Bess – An Original Sound Track Recording (Columbia 1959), excerpts from the 1959 motion picture soundtrack, featuring the voices of Robert McFerrin and Adele Addison, who dubbed the singing for Sidney Poitier and Dorothy Dandridge as Porgy and Bess in the film. Pearl Bailey and Brock Peters are also heard, but Cab Calloway substitutes on the record as Sportin' Life for Sammy Davis, Jr. because of contractual conflicts. Revised orchestrations and a new overture were written by the film's music director, André Previn who also conducts.
