= Porgy and Bess (disambiguation) =

Porgy and Bess is an opera by George Gershwin.

Porgy and Bess may also refer to:

== Recordings ==
- Highlights from Porgy and Bess, a 1935 recording of selections from the opera
- Porgy and Bess (1950 album), a recording of selections from the opera featuring Risë Stevens and Robert Merrill
- Porgy and Bess (1951 album), the first complete recording of the opera
- Porgy and Bess (Glyndebourne album), the 1988 Glyndebourne Festival recording of the opera
- Porgy and Bess (Harry Belafonte and Lena Horne album), 1959
- Porgy & Bess (Joe Henderson album), 1997
- Porgy and Bess (Ella Fitzgerald and Louis Armstrong album), 1957
- Porgy and Bess (Hank Jones album), released in 1959
- Porgy and Bess (Miles Davis album), released in 1959
- Porgy and Bess (Sammy Davis Jr. and Carmen McRae album), 1959
- Porgy & Bess (Mundell Lowe album), 1958
- Porgy & Bess (Buddy Collette album), 1959
- Porgy and Bess (Oscar Peterson and Joe Pass album), 1976
- Porgy and Bess (soundtrack), an album featuring the soundtrack to the 1959 film Porgy and Bess
- Selections from George Gershwin's Folk Opera Porgy and Bess, recordings by members of the original cast
- The Complete Porgy and Bess, a 1956 jazz recording featuring Mel Tormé
- The Gershwins' Porgy and Bess, a 2006 recording based on the opera's original 1935 production

== Others ==
- Porgy and Bess (film), the 1959 film directed by Otto Preminger
- Porgy and Bess: A Symphonic Picture, a 1942 symphonic arrangement by Robert Russell Bennett

== See also ==
- Porgy and Bess discography, a list of recordings
