= List of Grammy Hall of Fame Award recipients (E–I) =

The Grammy Hall of Fame is a hall of fame to honor musical recordings of lasting qualitative or historical significance. Inductees are selected annually by a special member committee of eminent and knowledgeable professionals from all branches of the recording arts. It is compiled by The Recording Academy in the United States, and was established in 1973. Recordings (singles and albums) in all genres are eligible for selection, and must be at least 25 years old to be considered. Additions to the list are chosen annually by a committee of recording arts professionals.

This list covers the letter(s) E–I.

== List ==
Title	Artist	Record label	Year of release	Genre	Format	Year inducted
"Early Autumn"	Woody Herman & his Orchestra	Capitol	1949	Jazz	Single	2000
"Earth Angel (Will You Be Mine)"	The Penguins	Dootone	1954	Doo-wop	Single	1998
"East-West"	The Paul Butterfield Blues Band	Elektra	1966	Blues	Single	1999
Eat a Peach	The Allman Brothers Band	Capricorn	1972	Southern rock	Album	2020
"Eight Miles High"	The Byrds	Columbia	1966	Psychedelic rock	Single	1999
"El Día que me Quieras"	Carlos Gardel	RCA Victor	1935	Tango	Single	2013
"El Paso"	Marty Robbins	Columbia	1959	Country	Single	1998
"Eleanor Rigby"	The Beatles	Capitol	1966	Baroque pop	Single	2002
Electric Ladyland	Jimi Hendrix Experience	Reprise	1968	Rock	Album	1999
Elgar: Violin Concerto	Yehudi Menuhin with London Symphony Orchestra conducted by Sir Edward Elgar	His Master's Voice	1932	Classical	Album	2007
Ella and Basie!	Ella Fitzgerald and Count Basie with Count Basie Orchestra	Verve	1963	Jazz	Album	2010
Ella and Louis	Ella Fitzgerald and Louis Armstrong	Verve	1956	Vocal jazz	Album	2016
Ella Fitzgerald Sings the Cole Porter Song Book	Ella Fitzgerald	Verve	1956	Jazz	Album	2000
Ella Fitzgerald Sings the George and Ira Gershwin Song Book	Ella Fitzgerald	Verve	1959	Jazz	Album	2019
Ella Fitzgerald Sings the Rodgers & Hart Song Book	Ella Fitzgerald	Verve	1956	Jazz	Album	1999
Ella in Berlin: Mack the Knife	Ella Fitzgerald	Verve	1960	Vocal jazz	Album	1999
Ellington at Newport	Duke Ellington & his Orchestra	Columbia	1956	Jazz	Album	2004
Elton John	Elton John	DJM	1970	Rock	Album	2013
"Embraceable You"	Billie Holiday	Commodore	1944	Jazz	Single	2005
"Empty Bed Blues"	Bessie Smith	Columbia	1928	Blues	Single	1983
"Everybody Loves Somebody"	Dean Martin	Reprise	1964	Traditional pop	Single	1999
"Everybody's Talkin'"	Harry Nilsson	RCA Victor	1968	Pop	Single	1999
"Every Breath You Take"	The Police	A&M	1983	New wave	Single	2019
"Everyday (I Have the Blues)"	Count Basie & his Orchestra (featuring vocals sung by Joe Williams)	Clef	1955	Jazz	Single	1992
"Every Day I Have the Blues"	B. B. King	RPM	1955	Blues	Single	2004
Exile on Main St.	The Rolling Stones	Rolling Stones	1972	Rock	Album	2012
Exodus	Bob Marley and the Wailers	Island	1977	Reggae	Album	2006
The Far East Suite	Duke Ellington and His Orchestra	RCA	1967	Jazz	Album	1999
"Fascinating Rhythm"	Fred Astaire & Adele Astaire featuring George Gershwin	English Columbia	1926	Pop	Single	2006
"The Fat Man"	Fats Domino	Imperial	1949	Rock & roll	Single	2016
Favorite Gospel Songs and Spirituals	The Blackwood Brothers	RCA Victor	1952	Gospel	Album	1999
"Feliz Navidad"	Jose Feliciano	RCA	1970	Latin pop	Single	2010
"Fever"	Peggy Lee	Capitol	1958	Jazz	Single	1998
Fiddler on the Roof Original Broadway Cast Album	Cast: Zero Mostel, Joanna Merlin, Julia Migenes, Maria Karnilova, Bert Convy, Michael Granger, Tanya Everett, etc.	RCA Victor	1964	Musical show	Album	1998
"Fight the Power"	Public Enemy	Motown	1989	Hip-hop	Single	2018
Finian's Rainbow Original Broadway Cast Recording	Cast: Ella Logan, Donald Richards, David Wayne, etc.	Columbia	1947	Musical show	Album	1998
"Fire and Rain"	James Taylor	Warner Bros.	1970	Folk rock	Single	1998
First Take	Roberta Flack	Atlantic	1969	Vocal jazz	Album	2016
"Fixin' to Die Blues"	Bukka White	Okeh	1940	Blues	Single	2012
"Flash Light"	Parliament	Casablanca	1978	Funk	Single	2018
Fleetwood Mac	Fleetwood Mac	Reprise	1975	Soft rock	Album	2016
"Flying Home"	Lionel Hampton & his Orchestra	Decca	1942	Jazz	Single	1996
Focus	Stan Getz	Verve	1961	Jazz	Album	1999
Foggy Mountain Banjo	Lester Flatt & Earl Scruggs with Foggy Mountain Boys	Columbia	1961	Bluegrass	Album	2013
"Foggy Mountain Breakdown"	Lester Flatt & Earl Scruggs with Foggy Mountain Boys	Mercury	1950	Bluegrass	Single	1999
Foggy Mountain Jamboree	Lester Flatt & Earl Scruggs	Columbia	1957	Bluegrass	Album	2012
"Folsom Prison Blues"	Johnny Cash	Sun	1956	Rockabilly	Single	2001
"For Dancers Only"	Jimmie Lunceford & his Orchestra	Decca	1937	Jazz	Single	1999
"For Me and My Gal"	Judy Garland and Gene Kelly	Decca	1942	Pop	Single	2010
"For Once in My Life"	Stevie Wonder	Tamla	1968	Soul	Single	2009
"For the Love of Money"	The O'Jays	Philadelphia International	1973	R&B	Single	2016
"For What It's Worth"	Buffalo Springfield	Atco	1967	Rock	Single	2000
Forever Changes	Love	Elektra	1967	Folk rock	Album	2008
"Fortunate Son"	Creedence Clearwater Revival	Fantasy	1969	Rock	Single	2014
"Four Brothers"	Woody Herman & his Orchestra	Columbia	1947	Jazz	Single	1984
Francis Albert Sinatra & Antonio Carlos Jobim	Frank Sinatra and Antonio Carlos Jobim	Reprise	1967	Jazz	Album	2019
Frank Sinatra Sings for Only the Lonely	Frank Sinatra	Capitol	1958	Vocal jazz	Album	1999
Frampton Comes Alive!	Peter Frampton	A&M	1976	Rock	Album	2020
"Frankie and Johnny"	Mississippi John Hurt	Okeh	1928	Folk	Single	2011
Freak Out!	The Mothers of Invention	Verve	1967	Rock	Album	1999
"Free Bird"	Lynyrd Skynyrd	MCA	1974	Rock	Single	2008
"Freight Train"	Elizabeth Cotten	Folkways	1958	Folk	Single	2021
"Frenesi"	Artie Shaw & his Orchestra	Victor	1940	Jazz	Single	2000
Full Moon Fever	Tom Petty	MCA	1989	Rock	Album	2019
Funny Girl Original Broadway Cast Album	Cast: Barbra Streisand, Sydney Chaplin, Kay Medford, Jean Stapleton, Danny Meehan, etc.	Capitol	1964	Musical show	Album	2004
Gade: "Jalousie 'Tango Tzigane'"	Boston Pops Orchestra conducted by Arthur Fiedler	Victor	1935	Classical	Single	2008
"The Gambler"	Kenny Rogers	United Artists	1978	Country	Single	2021
The Genius of Art Tatum, Vols. 1–13	Art Tatum	Clef	1953–54	Jazz	Album	1978
Genius of Modern Music: Volume 1	Thelonious Monk	Blue Note	1951	Jazz	Album	2003
Genius of Modern Music: Volume 2	Thelonious Monk	Blue Note	1952	Jazz	Album	2003
The Genius of Ray Charles	Ray Charles	Atlantic	1959	R&B	Album	1997
Genius + Soul = Jazz	Ray Charles	Impulse	1961	Jazz	Album	2011
"Gentle on My Mind"	Glen Campbell	Capitol	1967	Country	Single	2008
"Georgia on My Mind"	Hoagy Carmichael & his Orchestra (featuring Bix Beiderbecke on Cornet)	Victor	1930	Jazz	Single	2014
"Georgia on My Mind"	Ray Charles	ABC	1960	Soul	Single	1993
"Gershwin: An American in Paris"	George Gershwin with Victor Symphony Orchestra conducted by Nathaniel Shilkret	RCA Victor	1929	Jazz	Single	1997
Gershwin: Porgy and Bess	Lawrence Tibbett and Helen Jepson (with Orchestra conducted by Alexander Smallens and Nathaniel Shilkret)	RCA Victor	1935	Opera	Album	2002
Gershwin: Porgy and Bess Highlights, Volumes 1 and 2	Original cast And Broadway revival cast (Todd Duncan, Anne Brown)	Decca	1940–1942	Opera	Album	1990
Gershwin: Porgy and Bess (Complete Opera)	Cast: Lawrence Winters, Camilla Williams, Avon Long, Warren Coleman, Inez Matthews, June McMechen, etc. Conducted by Lehman Engel	Columbia	1951	Opera	Album	1976
Gershwin: Rhapsody in Blue	George Gershwin with Paul Whiteman & his Orchestra	Victor	1924	Jazz	Single	1974
Gershwin: Rhapsody in Blue	Oscar Levant with Philadelphia Orchestra conducted by Eugene Ormandy	Columbia	1945	Classical	Album	1990
"Get Up (I Feel Like Being a) Sex Machine"	James Brown	King	1970	Funk	Single	2014
"Get Up, Stand Up"	Bob Marley and the Wailers	Tuff Gong	1973	Reggae	Single	1999
"(Get Your Kicks on) Route 66"	The King Cole Trio	Capitol	1946	R&B	Single	2002
Getz/Gilberto	Stan Getz and João Gilberto	Verve	1964	Jazz	Album	1999
Giant Steps	John Coltrane	Atlantic	1960	Jazz	Album	2001
Gigi: Motion Picture Soundtrack	Cast: Betty Wand, Leslie Caron, Maurice Chevalier, Louis Jourdan, Hermione Gingold, John Abbott, etc.	MGM	1958	Soundtrack	Album	1998
"Gimme Some Lovin'"	Spencer Davis Group	United Artists	1966	Blue-eyed soul	Single	1999
"The Girl from Ipanema"	Stan Getz and Astrud Gilberto	Verve	1964	Bossa nova	Single	2000
"Give My Regards to Broadway"	Billy Murray	Columbia	1905	Musical theatre	Single	2008
"Gloria"	Them	Parrot	1964	Garage rock	Single	1999
"God Bless America"	Kate Smith	Victor	1938	Gospel	Single	1982
"God Bless the Child"	Billie Holiday	Okeh	1941	Jazz	Single	1976
"Goldfinger"	Shirley Bassey	Columbia	1964	Soundtrack	Single	2008
Gone with the Wind Film Soundtrack	Orchestra conducted by Max Steiner	MGM	1939	Soundtrack	Album	2006
"Good Rocking Tonight"	Wynonie Harris	King	1948	Jump blues	Single	2009
The Good, the Bad, and the Ugly	Ennio Morricone	Capitol	1966	Soundtrack	Album	2009
"Good Vibrations"	The Beach Boys	Capitol	1966	Art Pop	Single	1994
Goodbye Yellow Brick Road	Elton John	DJM	1973	Pop rock	Album	2003
"Goodnight Irene"	Huddie "Lead Belly" Ledbetter	Library of Congress	1936	Folk	Single	2002
"Got My Mojo Workin'"	Muddy Waters	Chess	1957	Blues	Single	1999
Graceland	Paul Simon	Warner Bros.	1986	Worldbeat	Album	2012
"Grazing in the Grass"	Hugh Masekela	Uni	1968	Jazz	Single	2018
"Great Balls of Fire"	Jerry Lee Lewis	Sun	1957	Rock & roll	Single	1998
"The Great Pretender"	The Platters	Mercury	1956	R&B	Single	2002
"The Great Speckled Bird"	Roy Acuff with the Crazy Tennesseans	Vocalion	1936	Gospel	Single	2009
"Green Onions"	Booker T. & the MG's	Stax	1962	R&B	Single	1999
Greetings from Asbury Park, N.J.	Bruce Springsteen	Columbia	1973	Rock	Album	2021
"Groovin'"	The Young Rascals	Atlantic	1967	Blue-eyed soul	Single	1999
"Groovin' High"	Dizzy Gillespie & His Sextet	Guild	1946	Jazz	Single	2000
Guys and Dolls: Original Broadway Cast Album	Cast: Robert Alda, Vivian Blaine, Isabel Bigley, Stubby Kaye, Sam Levene, etc.	Decca	1950	Musical show	Album	1998
Gypsy: Original Broadway Cast Album	Cast: Ethel Merman, Sandra Church, Jack Klugman, Lane Bradbury, etc.	Columbia	1959	Musical show	Album	1998
Hair	Cast: Gerome Ragni, James Rado, Ronnie Dyson, Melba Moore, Lynn Kellogg, etc.	RCA Victor	1968	Musical show	Album	2006
"Hallelujah"	Leonard Cohen	Columbia	1984	Folk rock	Single	2019
"Happy Days Are Here Again"	Ben Selvin & his Orchestra (featuring vocals sung by Annette Hanshaw)	Columbia	1930	Pop	Single	2007
"Happy Together"	The Turtles	White Whale	1967	Pop	Single	2007
"Happy Trails"	Roy Rogers and Dale Evans (with The Whippoorwills)	RCA Victor	1951	Country	Single	2009
A Hard Day's Night	The Beatles	United Artists	1964	Soundtrack	Album	2000
The Harder They Come	Jimmy Cliff and Various Artists	Island	1972	Soundtrack	Album	2008
"Harper Valley PTA"	Jeannie C. Riley	Plantation	1968	Country	Single	2019
Harris: Symphony No. 3	Serge Koussevitzky, conducted by. Boston Symphony Orchestra	RCA Victor	1940	Classical	Album	2012
Harvest	Neil Young	Reprise	1972	Rock	Album	2015
"He Stopped Loving Her Today"	George Jones	Epic	1980	Country	Single	2007
Head Hunters	Herbie Hancock	Columbia	1973	Jazz-funk	Album	2009
Heart Like a Wheel	Linda Ronstadt	Capitol	1974	Country rock	Album	2018
"Heart of Glass"	Blondie	Chrysalis	1979	Disco	Single	2016
"Heartbreak Hotel"	Elvis Presley	RCA Victor	1956	Rock & roll	Single	1995
Heavy Weather	Weather Report	Columbia	1977	Jazz fusion	Album	2011
"Heebie Jeebies"	Louis Armstrong and His Hot Five	Okeh	1926	Jazz	Single	1999
"He'll Have to Go"	Jim Reeves	RCA	1959	Country	Single	1999
"Hello Darlin'"	Conway Twitty	Decca	1970	Country	Single	1999
"Hello, Dolly!"	Louis Armstrong	Kapp	1964	Pop	Single	2001
Hello, Dolly! Original Broadway Cast Recording	Cast: Carol Channing, David Burns, Charles Nelson Reilly, Eileen Brennan, Alice Playten, Igors Gavon, Jerry Dodge, Sondra Lee, etc.	RCA Victor	1964	Musical show	Album	2002
"Hello Walls"	Faron Young	Capitol	1961	Country	Single	2000
"Help!"	The Beatles	Capitol	1965	Folk rock	Single	2008
"Help Me Make It Through the Night"	Sammi Smith	Mega	1970	Country	Single	1998
"(Hep-Hep!) The Jumpin' Jive"	Cab Calloway and His Orchestra	Vocalion	1939	Swing	Single	2017
Herb Alpert Presents Sergio Mendes & Brasil '66	Sergio Mendes & Brasil '66	A&M	1966	Bossa nova	Album	2012
Here's Little Richard	Little Richard	Specialty	1957	Rock & roll	Album	2013
"He's a Rebel"	The Crystals	Philles	1962	Rock & roll	Single	2004
"He's Got the Whole World in His Hands"	Marian Anderson	His Master's Voice	1958	Negro spiritual	Single	2008
"Hey, Good Lookin'"	Hank Williams	MGM	1951	Rockabilly	Single	2001
"Hey Jude"	The Beatles	Apple	1968	Rock	Single	2001
"Hey There"	Rosemary Clooney	Columbia	1954	Traditional pop	Single	1999
"Hide Away"	Freddy King	Federal	1961	Blues	Single	1999
Highway 61 Revisited	Bob Dylan	Columbia	1965	Rock	Album	2002
"His Eye Is on the Sparrow"	Mahalia Jackson	Columbia	1958	Gospel	Single	2010
The Hi-Lo's and All That Jazz	The Hi-Lo's	Columbia	1958	Jazz	Album	1998
"Hit the Road Jack"	Ray Charles with The Raelettes and Margie Hendricks	ABC	1961	Jazz	Single	2013
"Holiday for Strings"	David Rose	RCA Victor	1942	Classical	Single	2004
"Honeysuckle Rose"	Fats Waller	Victor	1934	Jazz	Single	1999
"Honky Tonk (Parts 1 and 2)"	Bill Doggett	King	1956	R&B	Single	1998
"Honky Tonk Women"	The Rolling Stones	Decca	1969	Rock	Single	2014
"Honky Tonkin'"	Hank Williams	MGM	1948	Country	Single	2015
Hoodoo Man Blues	Junior Wells & his Chicago blues Band	Delmark	1965	Blues	Album	2008
Horowitz at Carnegie Hall: An Historic Return	Vladimir Horowitz	Columbia	1965	Classical	Album	2002
Horses	Patti Smith	Arista	1975	Punk rock	Album	2021
Hot Buttered Soul	Isaac Hayes	Enterprise	1969	Soul	Album	2021
"Hotel California"	Eagles	Asylum	1977	Soft rock	Single	2003
Hotel California	Eagles	Asylum	1977	Soft rock	Album	2008
"Hound Dog"	Elvis Presley	RCA	1956	Rock & roll	Single	1988
"Hound Dog"	Big Mama Thornton	Peacock	1953	Blues	Single	2013
"The House I Live In"	Frank Sinatra	Columbia	1945	Soundtrack	Single	1998
"The House of the Rising Sun"	The Animals	Columbia Graphophone	1964	Rock	Single	1999
"How Can a Poor Man Stand Such Times and Live?"	Blind Alfred Reed	Victor	1930	Jazz	Single	2020
"How High the Moon"	Ella Fitzgerald	Verve	1960	Vocal jazz	Single	2002
"How High the Moon"	Les Paul and Mary Ford	Capitol	1951	Jazz	Single	1979
"How I Got Over"	Clara Ward	Gotham	1950	Soul	Single	2025
"How Long, How Long Blues"	Leroy Carr	Vocalion	1928	Blues	Single	2012
"I Apologize"	Billy Eckstine	MGM	1951	Pop	Single	1999
I Can Hear It Now, Vols. 1–3	Edward R. Murrow	Columbia	1948–1950	Spoken word	Album	1978
"(I Can't Get No) Satisfaction"	The Rolling Stones	London	1965	Rock	Single	1998
"I Can't Get Started"	Bunny Berigan	Victor	1937	Traditional pop	Single	1975
"I Can't Help Myself"	Four Tops	Motown	1965	Soul	Single	2018
"I Can't Make You Love Me"	Bonnie Raitt	Capitol	1991	Pop	Single	2017
"I Can't Stop Loving You"	Ray Charles	ABC-Paramount	1962	R&B	Single	2001
"I Fall to Pieces"	Patsy Cline	Decca	1961	Country	Single	2001
"I Feel Like Going Home"	Muddy Waters	Aristocrat	1948	Blues	Single	2010
"I Feel Love"	Donna Summer	Casablanca	1977	R&B	Single	2024
"I Fought the Law"	The Bobby Fuller Four	Mustang	1965	Garage rock	Single	2015
"I Get Around"	The Beach Boys	Capitol	1964	California sound	Single	2017
"I Got You (I Feel Good)"	James Brown	King	1965	R&B	Single	2013
"I Got You Babe"	Sonny & Cher	Atco	1965	Pop	Single	2017
"I Have a Dream"	Martin Luther King Jr.	20th Century Fox	1963	Spoken word	Track	2012
"I Heard It Through the Grapevine"	Marvin Gaye	Tamla	1968	R&B	Single	1998
"I Heard It Through the Grapevine"	Gladys Knight & the Pips	Soul	1967	R&B	Single	2018
"I Left My Heart in San Francisco"	Tony Bennett	Columbia	1962	Traditional pop	Single	1994
"I Love Rock 'n' Roll"	Joan Jett with the Blackhearts	Boardwalk	1981	Hard rock	Single	2016
"(I Love You) For Sentimental Reasons"	The King Cole Trio	Capitol	1946	Jazz	Single	2018
"I Loves You, Porgy"	Nina Simone	Bethlehem	1958	Jazz	Single	2000
"I Miss You So"	The Cats and the Fiddle	Bluebird	1939	R&B	Single	1999
I Never Loved a Man the Way I Love You	Aretha Franklin	Atlantic	1967	Southern soul	Album	2009
"I Only Have Eyes for You"	The Flamingos	End	1959	Doo-wop	Single	2003
"I Shot the Sheriff"	Eric Clapton	RSO	1974	Soft rock	Single	2003
I Started Out as a Child	Bill Cosby	Warner Bros.	1964	Stand-up comedy	Album	2012
"I Walk the Line"	Johnny Cash	Sun	1956	Country	Single	1998
"I Wanna Be Loved by You"	Helen Kane	Victor	1928	Pop	Single	2009
"I Want to Be a Cowboy's Sweetheart"	Patsy Montana (with the Prairie Ramblers)	American Record Corporation	1935	Country	Single	2007
"I Want to Hold Your Hand"	The Beatles	Capitol	1963	Pop rock	Single	1998
"I Want You Back"	The Jackson 5	Motown	1969	Pop	Single	1999
"I Will Always Love You"	Dolly Parton	RCA Nashville	1974	Country	Single	2007
"I Will Always Love You"	Whitney Houston	Arista	1992	Pop	Single	2018
"I Will Survive"	Gloria Gaynor	Polydor	1978	Disco	Single	2012
"I Wonder Why"	Dion & the Belmonts	Laurie	1958	Rock & roll	Single	1999
"If I Didn't Care"	The Ink Spots	Decca	1939	R&B	Single	1987
"If You Could See Me Now"	Sarah Vaughan	Musicraft	1946	Jazz	Single	1998
"If You've Got the Money I've Got the Time"	Lefty Frizzell	Columbia	1950	Country	Single	1999
"I'll Be There"	The Jackson 5	Motown	1970	R&B	Single	2011
"I'll Fly Away"	The Chuck Wagon Gang	Columbia Records	1949-50	Gospel	Single	2020
"I'll Never Smile Again"	Tommy Dorsey & his Orchestra (featuring vocals sung by Frank Sinatra and The Pied Pipers)	Victor	1940	Traditional pop	Single	1982
"I'll Take You There"	The Staple Singers	Stax	1972	R&B	Single	1999
"I'm a King Bee"	Slim Harpo	Excello	1957	Blues	Single	2008
"I'm a Man"	Bo Diddley	Checker	1955	Rhythm and blues	Single	2020
"I Am a Man of Constant Sorrow"	The Stanley Brothers & The Clinch Mountain Boys	Columbia	1951	Folk	Single	2020
"I'm Getting Sentimental Over You"	Tommy Dorsey and His Orchestra	Victor	1936	Traditional pop	Single	1998
"I'm Moving On"	Hank Snow	RCA Victor	1950	Country	Single	2000
"I'm So Lonesome I Could Cry"	Hank Williams	MGM	1949	Country	Single	1999
"I'm Sorry"	Brenda Lee	Decca	1960	Pop	Single	1999
"I'm Walkin'"	Fats Domino	Imperial	1957	Blues	Single	2019
"(I'm Your) Hoochie Coochie Man"	Muddy Waters	Chess	1954	Chicago blues	Single	1998
"Imagine"	John Lennon	Apple	1971	Soft rock	Single	1999
"In a Mist" (piano solo)	Bix Beiderbecke	Okeh	1927	Jazz	Single	1980
In a Silent Way	Miles Davis	Columbia	1969	Jazz	Album	2001
"The 'In' Crowd"	Ramsey Lewis & his Trio	Argo	1965	Jazz	Single	2009
"In My Room"	The Beach Boys	Capitol	1963	Pop	Single	1999
In San Francisco	The Cannonball Adderley Quintet	Riverside	1959	Jazz	Album	1999
"In the Jailhouse Now"	Jimmie Rodgers	Victor	1928	Country	Single	2007
"In the Midnight Hour"	Wilson Pickett	Atlantic	1965	R&B	Single	1999
"In the Mood"	Glenn Miller & his Orchestra	Bluebird	1939	Swing	Single	1983
In the Right Place	Dr. John	Atco	1973	Funk	Album	2021
"In the Still of the Night"	The Five Satins	Ember	1956	Rock & roll	Single	1998
In the Wee Small Hours	Frank Sinatra	Capitol	1955	Vocal jazz	Album	1984
The Incredible Jazz Guitar of Wes Montgomery	Wes Montgomery	Riverside	1960	Jazz	Album	1999
"Indian Love Call"	Nelson Eddy and Jeanette MacDonald	RCA	1936	Soundtrack	Single	2008
Innervisions	Stevie Wonder	Tamla	1973	Soul	Album	1999
"Is That All There Is?"	Peggy Lee	Capitol	1969	Pop	Single	1999
"Israelites"	Desmond Dekker with The Aces	Pyramid	1968	Rocksteady	Single	2007
"It Don't Mean a Thing (If It Ain't Got That Swing)"	Duke Ellington & his Famous Orchestra (featuring vocals sung by Ivie Anderson)	Brunswick	1932	Jazz	Single	2008
"It Had to Be You"	Isham Jones & his Orchestra	Warner Bros. Pictures	1924	Pop	Single	2007
It Takes a Nation of Millions to Hold Us Back	Public Enemy	Def Jam	1988	Hip-hop	Album	2020
"It Wasn't God Who Made Honky Tonk Angels"	Kitty Wells	Decca	1952	Country	Single	1998
"It's a Man's Man's Man's World"	James Brown	King	1966	R&B	Single	2010
"It's Not for Me to Say"	Johnny Mathis	Columbia	1957	Traditional pop	Single	2008
"It's Too Late"	Carole King	Ode	1971	Soft rock	Single	2003
"I've Been Loving You Too Long"	Otis Redding	Atco	1965	Soul	Single	2011
"I've Got a Tiger By the Tail"	Buck Owens	Capitol	1964	Country	Single	1999
"I've Got A Woman"	Ray Charles	Atlantic	1954	R&B	Single	1990
"I've Got the World on a String"	Frank Sinatra	Capitol	1953	Vocal jazz	Single	2004
"I've Got You Under My Skin"	Frank Sinatra	Capitol	1956	Traditional pop	Single	1998
Ives: Symphony No. 2	New York Philharmonic conducted by Leonard Bernstein	Columbia	1958	Classical	Album	2008

== See also ==
- Grammy Award
- Grammy Hall of Fame
- List of Grammy Hall of Fame Award recipients (A–D)
- List of Grammy Hall of Fame Award recipients (J–P)
- List of Grammy Hall of Fame Award recipients (Q–Z)
