= Porgy and Bess (1950 album) =

Studio album by Various artists
- Released: 1950
- Recorded: September 1950
- Genre: Opera
- Label: RCA Victor

Various artists chronology
Selections from George Gershwin's Folk Opera Porgy and Bess (1940)	Porgy and Bess (1950)	Porgy and Bess (1951 album) (1951)

This album is a 1950 recording of selections from George Gershwin's opera Porgy and Bess, sung by the noted opera stars Robert Merrill and Risë Stevens. The album features no black singers at all, even though the opera was written for a mostly African-American cast (the whites in the opera speak, but do not sing). It was recorded by RCA Victor on September 12 and September 13, 1950. The album was originally released on one twelve-inch 33 1/3 rpm LP with the catalog number LM 1124.

Naxos Records re-released the album on CD along with the complete 1951 recording, though the Naxos CD omitted the chorus number "Gone, Gone Gone". (Naxos 8.110287-88)

== Cast ==
- Robert Merrill, baritone
- Risë Stevens, mezzo-soprano
- Robert Shaw Chorale
- RCA Victor Orchestra
- Robert Russell Bennett, conductor

== Track listing ==
Track	Song Title
1.	Summertime
2.	"A Woman Is a Sometime Thing"
3.	"Gone, Gone, Gone"
4.	"My Man's Gone Now"
5.	"I Got Plenty of Nuttin'"
6.	"Bess, You Is My Woman Now"
7.	"It Ain't Necessarily So"
8.	"Where Is My Bess"
