= Alvy =

Alvy is a masculine given name or nickname. It may refer to:

- Alvy Moore (1921–1997), American actor
- Alvy Powell (born 1955), American opera singer and former member of the US Army Chorus, oldest enlisted US Army soldier at his retirement
- Alvy Ray Smith (born 1943), American computer scientist who worked on computer animation in films
- Alvy Singer, Woody Allen's character in the film Annie Hall
