= Porgy and Bess (soundtrack) =

Porgy and Bess – An Original Sound Track Recording

Soundtrack album by various artists
- Released: 1959
- Label: Columbia

Porgy and Bess, subtitled An Original Sound Track Recording, is a 1959 album featuring the original soundtrack to the film Porgy and Bess, released by Samuel Goldwyn in the same year.

== Background ==
The album features all the singing voices heard in the film with the exception of that of Sammy Davis Jr., who played Sportin' Life on screen. On this recording, his parts are sung by Cab Calloway.

== Release ==
The album was released on LP in both mono (cat. no. OL 5410) and stereo (cat. no. OS 2016) versions.

== Critical reception ==
Professional ratings
Review scores
Source	Rating
Billboard	(favorable)

Billboard picked the album as one of the "Spotlight winners of the week", writing: "The soundtrack LP of the soon-to-be-released version of Porgy and Bess will be the blockbuster among the recent heavy drop of albums devoted to the score." The magazine's reviewer also noted the "fine cover photo of Sidney Poitier and Dorothy Dandridge", "provid[ing] a sock display piece".

== Track listing ==
LP – Columbia OS 2016 (stereo), OL 5410 (mono)

All lyrics are written by DuBose Heyward, Ira Gershwin; all music is composed by George Gershwin.

Side 1
No.	Title	Length
1.	"Overture"	5:18
2.	"Summertime"	2:37
3.	"A Woman Is a Sometime Thing"	1:57
4.	"The Wake: Gone, Gone, Gone; Porgy's Prayer"	3:21
5.	"My Man's Gone Now"	4:00
6.	"I Got Plenty o' Nuttin'"	3:08
7.	"Bess, You Is My Woman Now"	5:09

Side 2
No.	Title	Length
1.	"Morning; Catfish Row"	1:33
2.	"I Can't Sit Down"	2:03
3.	"It Ain't Necessarily So"	3:06
4.	"I Ain't Got No Shame"	1:18
5.	"What You Want with Bess?"	2:08
6.	"Street Cries: Strawberry Woman; Crab Man"	2:26
7.	"I Loves You, Porgy"	3:25
8.	"A Red-Headed Woman"	1:09
9.	"Clara, Clara"	2:13
10.	"There's a Boat That's Leavin' Soon for New York"	2:16
11.	"Oh, Where's My Bess?"	2:32
12.	"I'm on My Way"	1:49

== Awards ==
Year	Award type	Categories	Results	Ref.
1959	Grammy Awards	Best Sound Track Album, Original Cast – Motion Picture or Television	Won	
