= Cabbage Row =

Buildings in Charleston, South Carolina, United States

Coordinates: 32.775206°N 79.929231°W

Cabbage Row is a set of pre-Revolutionary buildings at 89 and 91 Church Street in Charleston, South Carolina. The buildings are most notable for having been the inspiration for "Catfish Row" in the DuBose Heyward novel Porgy and later the opera Porgy and Bess by Gershwin. DuBose Heyward had lived nearby on Church Street.

The buildings were perhaps operated as counting houses when they were built, but after the earthquake of 1886, their condition deteriorated until they were a well-known "resort for sailors."

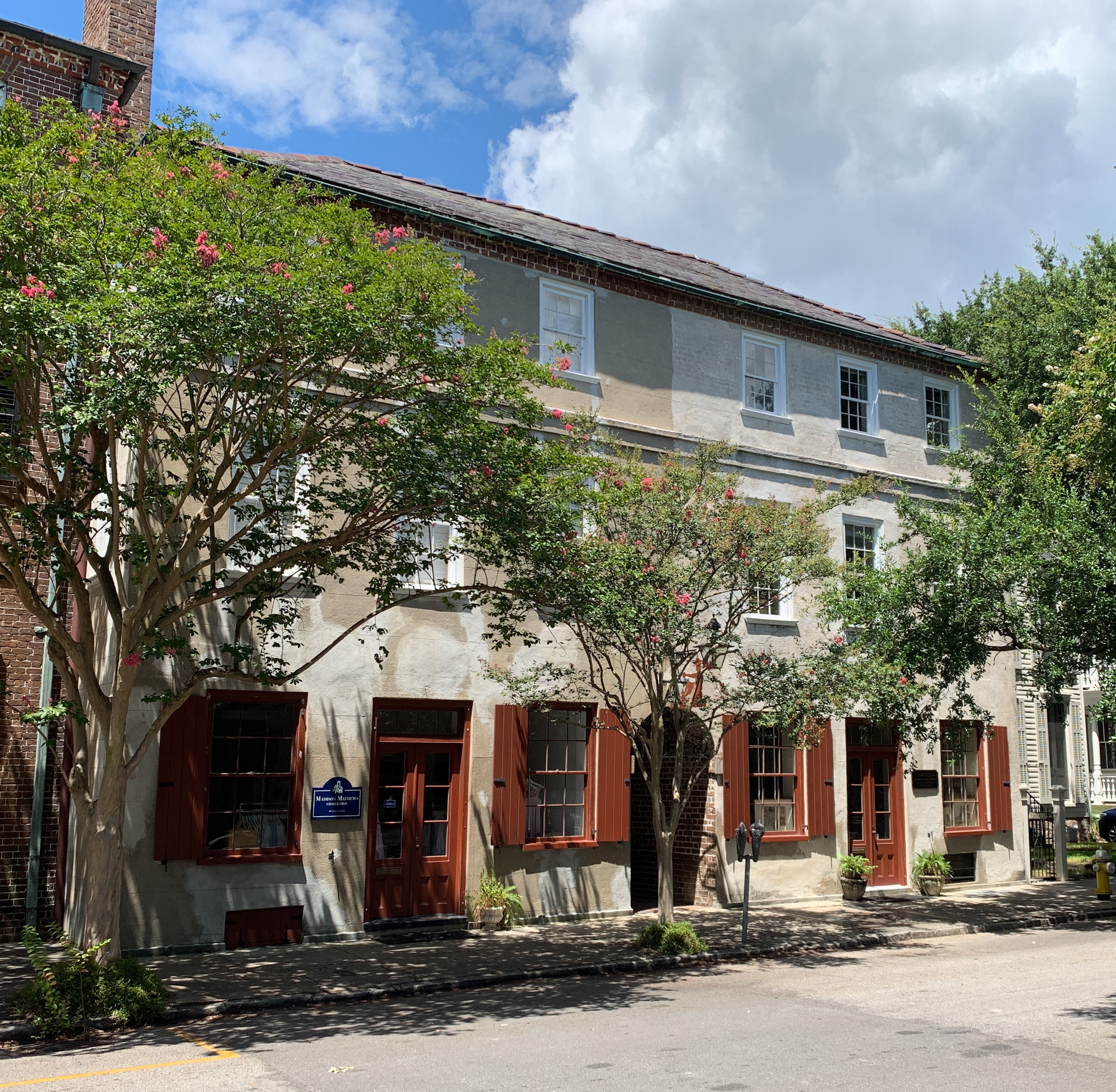
89-91 Church St.

The property was bought by landscape architect Loutrel Briggs in February 1928. Mr. Briggs intended to restore the buildings as residences suitable for artists. The property sold next to Charles H. Gibbs and his business partners in 1955.
