= Porgy & Bess (Buddy Collette album) =

Studio album by Buddy Collette and the Poll Winners
- Released: 1959
- Recorded: July 1957; Los Angeles, CA
- Genre: Jazz
- Label: Interlude MO 505
- Producer: Robert Scherman

Buddy Collette chronology
Everybody's Buddy (1957)	Porgy & Bess (1959)	Flute Fraternity (1957)

Porgy & Bess (subtitled Modern Interpretations) is an album by multi-instrumentalist Buddy Collette featuring jazz versions of music from the George Gershwin opera Porgy and Bess recorded at sessions in 1957 and released on the Interlude label in 1959.

== Reception ==
Professional ratings
Review scores
Source	Rating
Allmusic	2/5 stars

Allmusic awarded the album 2 stars with the review by Scott Yanow stating "other than the unusual colors, little all that surprising happens during the obscure cool jazz effort".

== Track listing ==
All compositions by George Gershwin

1. "Oh Bess, Oh Where's My Bess?" - 2:57
2. "My Man's Gone Now" - 3:24
3. "Summertime" - 4:13
4. "It Ain't Necessarily So" - 3:28
5. "I Got Plenty o' Nuttin'" - 2:38
6. "There's a Boat That's Leavin' for New York" - 3:20
7. "Bess, You Is My Woman Now" - 3:26
8. "A Woman Is a Sometime Thing" - 4:42

== Personnel ==
- Buddy Collette - flute, bass clarinet
- Pete Jolly - accordion
- Gerald Wiggins - organ
- Jim Hall - guitar
- Red Callender - bass
- Louie Bellson - drums
