= Grammy Hall of Fame =

Hall of fame for musical recordings

The Grammy Hall of Fame is a hall of fame to honor musical recordings of lasting qualitative or historical significance. Inductees are selected annually by a special member committee of eminent and knowledgeable professionals from all branches of the recording arts. It is compiled by The Recording Academy in the United States, and was established in 1973. Recordings (singles and albums) in all genres are eligible for selection, and must be over 25 years old to be considered. Additions to the list are chosen annually by a committee of recording arts professionals.

Alphabetical listing by title:

- List of Grammy Hall of Fame Award recipients (A–D)
- List of Grammy Hall of Fame Award recipients (E–I)
- List of Grammy Hall of Fame Award recipients (J–P)
- List of Grammy Hall of Fame Award recipients (Q–Z)

== See also ==
- Grammy Museum at L.A. Live
- Grammy Lifetime Achievement Award
- Latin Grammy Hall of Fame Award
- National Recording Registry
