= Helen Jepson =

American opera singer (1904–1997)

- Born: Helen Jepson; November 28, 1904; Titusville, Pennsylvania
- Died: September 16, 1997 (aged 92); Bradenton, Florida
- Occupation: Opera singer
- Spouse(s): George Poselle (19?? - 19??); Walter Dellera (19?? - 19??)

Helen Jepson (November 28, 1904 – September 16, 1997) was an American lyric soprano.

== Early years ==
Jepson was born in Titusville, Pennsylvania, on November 28, 1904, (Two sources give her birthday as November 28, 1906.) and raised in Akron, Ohio, where she studied voice and performed in high school operatic productions. Her father operated a confectionery store in Akron. Her mother died when Helen was 13, an event that left her to care for her father and her sister, who was 3 at the time.

She attended the Curtis Institute in Philadelphia on scholarship. She sang with the Philadelphia Civic Opera Company and formed a four singer group called "The Mississippi Misses", traveling "6,000 miles in 12 weeks giving concerts in 87 towns".

== Career ==
Jepson's professional success accelerated in Philadelphia leading to a move to New York City with her husband, flautist George Poselle. (Two sources spell his last name Possell, rather than Poselle.) Her career in radio began in 1933 with a performance with the Hamburg Symphony Orchestra conducted by Philip James. The broadcast was only local to New Jersey. She would later perform on the radio with bandleaders Paul Whiteman and Rudy Vallee also. She was selected as "Most Important New Air Personality of 1934".

Her radio broadcasts attracted the attention of the Metropolitan Opera and her debut there was in John Laurence Seymour's one-act opera In the Pasha's Garden. Her husband also found employment with the Met. She sang leading soprano roles with at Metropolitan Opera from 1935 to 1941. Some of her best known roles while at the Met include Desdemona (Otello) and Marguerite (Faust). The Faust recording is still in print, as is her recording of Porgy and Bess; she was the first soprano to record in that role, and the extant recording of her was supervised by Gershwin himself.

Helen Jepson had a summer home in Wurtsboro, New York. On September 14, 1940 at the request of Wurtsboro Fire Chief Ed Wilkinson, Sr., Helen marched in the Sullivan County Volunteer Fireman's Parade in Monticello as an Honorary Chief of the Wurtsboro Fire Department.

Jepson's attempt to move into Hollywood was unsuccessful, although it did expose her to wider audiences. Her only film role was 1938's unsuccessful The Goldwyn Follies, in which she sang the "Brindisi" from Verdi's La Traviata, Enrico Toselli's "La Serenata", the Gershwins' "Love Walked In", and "Sempre Libera", also from Verdi's La Traviata. Paramount offered her further work, but as filmed opera never proved successful, the deal never came to fruition.

Jepson and George Poselle were divorced and she married Walter Dellera, son of Ricardo Dellera, a conductor and voice coach for the Metropolitan Opera. Jepson then became a resident of Closter, New Jersey, where she gave music lessons at a studio in her home and lectured at the Junior College of Bergen County.

In later life, Jepson attended Seton Hall University and acquired a degree in speech therapy. She worked for the school district in Monmouth County, New Jersey as a speech therapist for children. When she retired she and Walter Dellera moved to Bradenton, Florida where she was very active with the Bradenton Opera Guild.

== Personal life ==
Jepson and Possell had a daughter, Sallie Patricia; with Dellera she had a son, Ricardo.

== Death ==
She died in Bradenton, Florida on September 16, 1997, aged 92.
