= Geoffrey Block =

American musicologist and author

- Born: May 7, 1948 (age 77)
- Education: PhD, Harvard University, 1979 AM, Harvard University, 1973 AB, University of California at Los Angeles, 1970
- Occupation: Musicologist

Geoffrey Block (born May 7, 1948) is an American musicologist and author. He is Distinguished Professor Emeritus of Music History and Humanities at the University of Puget Sound. He has written numerous books, essays, and journal articles on American musical theater and musical film, and books on Ludwig van Beethoven, Charles Ives, Richard Rodgers, and Franz Schubert. He was the General Editor of Yale Broadway Masters and is the Series Editor of Oxford’s Broadway Legacies, two series of scholarly books accessible to general audiences.

== Career ==
Block received his B.A. from UCLA and his A.M. and Ph.D. in Musicology from Harvard University, the latter in 1979. He began his teaching career at The Thacher School from 1977 to 1980 before moving to the University of Puget Sound where he taught from 1980 to 2018. Block began his writing career with several articles based on his dissertation on the compositional process of Beethoven’s Piano Concertos No. 1 in C Major, Op. 15 and No. 2 in B-Flat Major, Op. 19. His interest in Beethoven's compositional process combined with his interest in musical theater both as a scholar and a composer led him to explore the genesis and compositional process of Frank Loesser's sketchbooks for The Most Happy Fella in The Musical Quarterly (1989), the first musicological examination of a Broadway musical (other than Porgy and Bess) to appear in a mainstream music journal and according to one scholar, “provided one of the first moments of legitimacy to scholarship on the American musical [and] essential reading for anyone interested in the genre and its historiography.”

His article on the Broadway canon in The Journal of Musicology (1993) broke new ground in the discussion of the genre. Several years later, in the absence of a textbook that seriously engaged the crucial role music played in the dramatic realization of a musical, Block wrote his own, Enchanted Evenings: The Broadway Musical from “Show Boat” to Sondheim (1997). In the second edition (2009) Block expanded the title to include "and Lloyd Webber" and added two new chapters on musical film adaptations. Books on Richard Rodgers and numerous articles would follow (see the Selected Bibliography). One scholar has written that “Block is unquestionably the leading academic authority on the American musical.” Stephen Sondheim described another Block essay as “virtually unique in its specificity and intelligence.”

Since 2000, much of Block’s work on stage musicals pays close attention to their often maligned film musical adaptations. This work led to his most recent book, A Fine Romance: Adapting Broadway to Hollywood in the Studio System Era (2023), in which Block explores the symbiotic relationship between a dozen Broadway musicals and their Hollywood studio film adaptations from the late 1920s to the early 1970s.

In discussing the dramatic and musical consequences at play in the often differing artistic and commercial choices made by Broadway stage musicals and their Hollywood film adaptations, Block regularly challenges the conventional wisdom that critically favors stage musicals as invariably superior to their film offspring.

Perhaps Block’s longest-lasting contributions to the field of musical theater and film are the dozens of books on the Broadway musical he has commissioned and edited. From 2003 and 2010 he served as general editor for Yale Broadway Masters (Block’s Richard Rodgers was the first). Since 2010, he has been the series editor of Oxford’s Broadway Legacies, which includes volumes on composers, librettists, lyricists, directors, choreographers, and individual musicals.

== Selected bibliography ==
- “Some Gray Areas in the Evolution of Beethoven’s Piano Concerto B Flat Major, Op. 19.” In Beethoven Essays, ed. by Lewis Lockwood and Phyllis Benjamin. Cambridge, MA: Harvard University Press, 1984
- “Frank Loesser’s Sketchbooks for 'The Most Happy Fella,'” The Musical Quarterly 74/1 (1989): 60-78
- “A New Cadenza for Beethoven’s Fortepiano Concerto in C Major, Opus 15,” The Beethoven Newsletter 4/3 (Winter 1989): 49 and 62-67
- “Gershwin’s Buzzard and Other Mythological Creatures,” The Opera Quarterly 7/2 (Summer 1990): 74-82
- “Organic Relations in Beethoven’s Early Piano Concerti and the ‘Spirit of Mozart.’" In Beethoven’s Compositional Process, ed. by William Kinderman. Lincoln: University of Nebraska Press, 1991
- “The Broadway Canon from 'Show Boat' to 'West Side Story' and the European Operatic Ideal,” The Journal of Musicology 11/4 (Fall 1993): 528-47
- Ives: Piano Sonata No. 2 (“Concord, Mass., 1840-1860”). Cambridge Music Handbooks. Cambridge: Cambridge University Press, 1996
- Charles Ives and the Classical Tradition. New Haven, CT: Yale University Press, 1996, editor with J. Peter Burkholder
- Review-Essay. “Irving Berlin. Early Songs, edited by Charles Hamm,” Notes 53/4 (June 1997): 1321-25
- “Remembrances of Dissonances Past: The Two Published Editions of 'Concord Sonata.'” In Ives Studies, ed. by Philip Lambert. Cambridge: Cambridge University Press, 1998
- “American Musical Theater" (1. Overview; 2. 1930-50); Richard Adler; Jerry Bock; Cy Coleman; William Finn; Marvin Hamlisch: John Kander; Frank Loesser; Frederick Loewe; Richard Rodgers; Claude-Michel Schönberg; Charles Strouse; Robert Wright; Maury Yeston. The New Grove Dictionary of Music and Musicians / Grove Music Online (2001)
- “The Melody (and the Words) Linger On: Musical Comedies of the 1920s and 1930s.” In The Cambridge Companion to the Musical, ed. by William Everett and Paul Laird Cambridge: Cambridge University Press, 2002; 2nd ed. 2008; 3rd ed. 2017
- The Richard Rodgers Reader. New York: Oxford University Press, 2002, editor
- Richard Rodgers. Yale Broadway Masters. New Haven: Yale University Press, 2003
- Review-Essay. “‘Reading Musicals’: Andrea Most’s Making Americans: Jews and the Broadway Musical,” The Journal of Musicology 21/4 (Fall 2004): 563-84
- Review-Essay. “Earl ‘Fatha’ Hines. Selected Piano Solos, 1928-1941, edited by Jeffrey Taylor,” Notes 64/4 (June 2007): 934-38
- “‘Bigger Than a Show—Better Than a Circus’: The Broadway Musical, Radio, and Billy Rose’s 'Jumbo,'” The Musical Quarterly 89/2-3 (December 2007); 164-98
- “Revisiting the Glorious and Problematic Legacy of the Jazz Age and Depression Musical,” Studies in Musical Theatre 2/2 (2008): 127-46
- “Bernstein’s Senior Thesis at Harvard: The Roots of a Lifelong Search to Discover an American Musical Identity,” The College Music Symposium 48 (2008): 52-68
- Enchanted Evenings: The Broadway Musical from “Show Boat” to Sondheim and Lloyd Webber New York: Oxford University Press, 2009. Expanded second ed. of Enchanted Evenings: The Broadway Musical from “Show Boat” to Sondheim. New York: Oxford University Press, 1997; paperback ed. 2004
- “Integration.” In The Oxford Handbook of the American Musical, ed. by Raymond Knapp, Mitchell Morris, and Stacy Wolf. New York: Oxford University Press, 2011
- “Is Life a Cabaret? 'Cabaret' and Its Sources in Reality and the Imagination,” Studies in Musical Theatre 5/2 (2011): 163-80
- Review-Essay. “Analyzing Schubert by Suzannah Clark, Vanishing Sensibilities: Schubert, Beethoven, Schumann by Kristina Muxfeldt, and Schubert’s Fingerprints: Studies in the Instrumental Works by Susan Wollenberg,” Notes 69/2 (December 2012): 292-303
- “From Screen to Stage: Transforming 'Smiles of a Summer Night' and 'Passione d’Amore.'” In The Oxford Handbook of Sondheim Studies, ed. by Robert Gordon. New York: Oxford University Press, 2014
- “Disney as Auteur: The Disney Versions of Broadway Musicals for Television in the Late 1990s and Early 2000s.” In The Disney Musical on Stage and Screen, ed. by George Rodosthenous. London: Bloomsbury Methuen Drama, 2017
- Experiencing Beethoven: A Listener’s Companion. Lanham, MD: Rowman & Littlefield, 2017
- Schubert’s Reputation from His Time to Ours. Hillsdale, NY: Pendragon, 2017
- “Refashioning 'Roberta': From Novel to Stage to Screen.” In The Oxford Handbook of Musical Theatre Screen Adaptations, ed. by Dominic McHugh. New York: Oxford University Press, 2019
- “The Last Word: Rewriting Musical Theatre History with Sondheim,” Studies in Musical Theatre 13/2 (2019): 133-50
- “‘A sad and listless affair’: The Unsung Film Adaptation of 'A Little Night Music.'” In Sondheim in Our Time and His, ed. by W. Anthony Sheppard. New York: Oxford University Press, 2022
- “When Fred Lost Ginger: Thoughts on the Genesis and Legacy of 'A Damsel in Distress.'” In The Oxford Handbook of the Hollywood Musical, ed. by Dominic Broomfield-McHugh. New York: Oxford University Press, 2022
- A Fine Romance: Adapting Broadway to Hollywood in the Studio System Era. New York: Oxford University Press, 2023
- Love Me Tonight. Oxford’s Guides to Film Musicals, ed. by Dominic Broomfield-McHugh. New York: Oxford University Press, 2024
