= Highlights from Porgy and Bess =

Studio album by various
- Released: 1940
- Recorded: October 1935
- Genre: Opera
- Label: Victor

Various chronology
Highlights from Porgy and Bess (1940)	Selections from George Gershwin's Folk Opera Porgy and Bess (1940)

Highlights from Porgy and Bess, the 1935 album of George Gershwin's opera, was recorded just days after Porgy and Bess opened on Broadway on October 10, 1935. While the opera was performed by an all-African American singing cast, the 1935 album featured mostly white opera singers. Gershwin's involvement is clearly stated on the album cover, which reads "Recorded under the supervision of the composer."

The recordings originally came on 4 twelve-inch 78 rpm shellac records. RCA Victor assigned the publishing numbers 11878 Victor, 11879 Victor, 11880 Victor and 11881 Victor to the records.

== Cast ==
- Lawrence Tibbett (Porgy)
- Helen Jepson (Bess)
- Alexander Smallens, conductor
- Nathaniel Shilkret, conductor (for "My Man's Gone Now")

== Track listing ==
1. "It Ain't Necessarily So" (Act 2), Victor 11878-A
2. "The Buzzard Song" (Act 2) Victor 11878-B
3. (1) Scene: "Summertime" and "Crap Game", (2) "A Woman Is a Sometime Thing" (Act 1), Victor 11879-A
4. "Bess, You Is My Woman Now" (Act 1), Victor 11879-B
5. "I Got Plenty o' Nuttin'" (Act 2), Victor 11880-A
6. "Where Is My Bess" (Act 3), Victor 11880-B
7. Lullaby: "Summertime and the Livin' Is Easy" (Act 1), Victor 11881-A
8. "My Man's Gone Now" (Act 1), Victor 11881-B

== Re-releases ==
Parts of this recording have been re-issued by various recording companies on compact disc.

- Lawrence Tibbett: From Broadway to Hollywood, Nimbus Records, UPC 710357788123
- Porgy and Bess (Original Cast Recordings) (1935-1942), Naxos Records, 8.110219-20
