= The Complete Porgy and Bess =

Porgy and Bess

Studio album by various
- Released: 1956
- Recorded: May 1956
- Genre: Show tunes Swing; Traditional pop Vocal jazz
- Label: Bethlehem Records

Various chronology
Porgy and Bess (1951 album) (1951)	Porgy and Bess (1956)

This 1956 recording based on George Gershwin's opera Porgy and Bess was the second "complete" recording of the opera after the 1951 version, and the first recording of the work to feature jazz singers and musicians instead of operatic singers and a classical orchestra.

Russell Garcia arranged Gershwin's work for the Bethlehem Orchestra, the Duke Ellington Orchestra, the Australian Jazz Quintet, the Pat Moran Quartet and the Stan Levey Group. Mel Tormé sang the role of Porgy and Frances Faye the role of Bess. The Ellington Orchestra plays "Summertime" as the overture, but does not appear elsewhere on the album.

Originally released by Bethlehem Records in 1956 (3BP-1); reissued in the 1970s (EXLP-1). Highlights from this recording released by Bethlehem as BCP 6040 and BCP 6009. On CD: Bethlehem Records #BET6028-2 (Released 1994), Rhino Records #75828 (Released 1999).

== Cast ==
- Mel Tormé (Porgy)
- Frances Faye (Bess)
- Johnny Hartman (Crown)
- Betty Roche (Clara)
- George Kirby (Sportin' Life)
- Sallie Blair (Serena)
- Frank Rosolino (Jake)
- Loulie Jean Norman (Strawberry Woman)
- Joe Derise (Honey Man)
- Bob Dorough (Crab Man)
- Pat Moran Quartet (Pat Moran McCoy, John Doling, Johnny Whited, Bev Kelly)

== Orchestra ==
- Duke Ellington Orchestra): Duke Ellington, piano; William "Cat" Anderson, Willie Cook, Clark Terry (trumpet); Ray Nance (trumpet, violin); Quentin Jackson, John Sanders, Britt Woodman (trombone); Russell Procope (clarinet, alto saxophone); Jimmy Hamilton (clarinet, tenor saxophone); Johnny Hodges (alto saxophone); Paul Gonsalves (tenor saxophone); Harry Carney (baritone saxophone); Jimmy Woode (bass); Sam Woodyard (drums)
- Australian Jazz Quintet: Dick Healey (alto saxophone, flute); Erroll Buddle (tenor saxophone, bassoon); Jack Brokensha (vibraphone); Bryce Rohde (piano); Jimmy Gannon (bass); Frank Capp (drums)
- Stan Levey Group: Conte Candoli, (trumpet); Frank Rosolino (trombone); Richie Kamuca (tenor saxophone); Sonny Clark (piano); Leroy Vinnegar (bass); Stan Levey (drums)
