= The Gershwins' Porgy and Bess =

Studio album by Decca Records
- Released: September 12, 2006
- Recorded: February 24–25, 2006
- Genre: Opera
- Label: Decca

Porgy and Bess (2006), first studio cast recording directly based on the original 1935 production of George Gershwin's opera Porgy and Bess. The music used for this was compiled through research by John Mauceri who also conducted the musical forces for the recording.

This studio recording originated as several semi-staged performances which took place on February 24 and 25, 2006 at the Tennessee Performing Arts Center in Nashville, with Alvy Powell as Porgy, Marquita Lister as Bess, Nicole Cabell as Clara and Robert Mack as Sportin' Life. The Nashville Symphony Orchestra was conducted by Mauceri. The recording incorporates changes Gershwin made to his original score after its first publication, which were not discovered until 1987.

== Track listing ==
=== Disc 1 ===
1. "Introduction"
2. "Summertime"
3. "Seems Like Those Bones Don't Give Me Nothin' But Boxcars Tonight"
4. "Summertime"
5. "What, That Chile Ain't Asleep Yet?...A Woman Is A Sometime Thing (Lissen To Yo' Daddy Warn You)"
6. "Honey Man! Honey Man! Here Come De Honey Man"
7. "They Pass By Singin' (No, No, Brudder, Porgy Ain' Sof' On No Woman)"
8. "Here Comes Big Boy!"
9. "Crown Cock-Eyed Drunk...Oh, Little Stars"
10. "Oh, Stop Them! Don't Let Them Fight!"
11. "Wake Up An' Hit It Out. You Ain't Got No Time To Lose"
12. "Gone, Gone, Gone (Where Is Brudder Robbins?)...Overflow"
13. "Um! A Saucer-Buryin' Setup, I See"
14. "My Man's Gone Now"
15. "How De Saucer Stan' Now, My Sister?"
16. "Leavin' For The Promise' Lan' (Oh, The Train Is At The Station)"
17. "It Take A Long Pull To Get There (Oh, I'm A-goin' Out To The Blackfish Banks)"
18. "Oh, I Got Plenty O' Nuttin'"
19. "Mornin', Lawyer, Lookin' For Somebody?"
20. "Dey's A Buckra Comin'"
21. "'Lo, Bess, Goin' To De Picnic?"
22. "Bess, You Is My Woman Now"
23. "Oh, I Can't Sit Down"

=== Disc 2 ===
1. "Allegretto Barbaro Ha Da Da, Ha Da Da"
2. "It Ain't Necessarily So"
3. "Crown! - You Know Very Well Dis Crown"
4. "Oh...What You Want Wid Bess?"
5. "Honey, Dat's All De Breakfast I Got Time For"
6. "Well, If It Ain' Ole Peter!"
7. "Oh, Doctor Jesus"
8. "Oh Dey's So Fresh An' Fine...I'm Talkin' About Devil Crabs"
9. "Porgy, Porgy, Dat You There Ain't It?"
10. "I Loves You, Porgy"
11. "Why You Been Out On That Wharf So Long, Clara?"
12. "Storm"
13. "Oh, De Lawd Shake De Heavens"
14. "One Of Dese Mornin's...Oh, Dere's Soebody Knockin' At De Do'"
15. "You Is A Nice Parcel Of Christmas"
16. "A Red-Headed Woman"
17. "Jake's Boat In De River, Upside Down!"
18. "Clara, Clara, Don't You Be Downhearted"
19. "Ha Ha Ha"
20. "Summertime"
21. "Introduction/Wait For Us At The Corner, Al"
22. "Listen: There's A Boat Dat's Leavin' Soon For New York"
23. "Occupational Humoresque/Good Mornin'"
24. "It's Porgy Comin' Home"
25. "Oh, Bess, Oh Where's My Bess"
26. "Where Bess Gone?...Oh Lawd, I'm On My Way"

== Cast of the 2006 version ==
Porgy	bass-baritone	Alvy Powell
Bess	soprano	Marquita Lister
Clara	soprano	Nicole Cabell
Sportin' Life	tenor	Robert Mack
Crown	baritone	Lester Lynch
