= Cynthia Haymon =

American soprano

Cynthia Haymon-Coleman (born September 6, 1958, in Jacksonville, Florida) is an American soprano. She is known for the beauty of her voice and seeming ease with which she uses it, and more recently as a voice teacher. She received a bachelor's degree of music in vocal performance from Northwestern University. In 2016, she retired from the faculty at the University of Illinois at Urbana Champaign, and presently teaches privately from her studio in Champaign, Illinois.

== Performances ==
Her operatic roles include Bess in Porgy and Bess, Liù in Turandot, Mimì in La bohème, Poppea in L'incoronazione di Poppea, Micaela in Carmen, Pamina in The Magic Flute, Lauretta in Gianni Schicchi, and Susanna in The Marriage of Figaro.

She gave the world premiere of John Williams' "Seven for Luck" with the Boston Symphony Orchestra, a piece for soprano and orchestra based on the texts of Rita Dove.

She was nominated for a Grammy Award for her performance as Bess, which she sang in the 1986 Glyndebourne production, the 1989 album made from that production, and the 1993 television production of the work.

== Videography ==
- Glyndebourne Festival Opera: a Gala Evening (1992), Arthaus Musik DVD, 100-432, 2004
