= Selections from George Gershwin's Folk Opera Porgy and Bess =

Decca Presents Selections from George Gershwin's folk opera Porgy and Bess

Studio album by various
- Released: 1952
- Recorded: 1940 & 1942
- Genre: Opera
- Label: Decca

Porgy and Bess chronology
Highlights from Porgy and Bess (1935)	Decca Presents Selections from George Gershwin's folk opera Porgy and Bess (1952)	Porgy and Bess (1950 album) (1950)

Decca Presents Selections from George Gershwin's folk opera Porgy and Bess consists of two volumes of records, the first from 1940, and the next from 1942.

The 1940 album was the first to record selections from George Gershwin's opera Porgy and Bess as sung by members of the original Broadway cast from 1935. The only singers involved were Todd Duncan as Porgy and Anne Brown as Bess. Duncan sang "It Ain't Necessarily So", which is sung in the opera by Sportin' Life. Anne Brown sang "Summertime" (first sung in the opera by Clara) and "My Man's Gone Now" (sung in the opera by Serena). Decca Records originally released this first volume on 4 twelve-inch 78 rpm shellac records assigned the numbers 29067, 29068, 29069 and 29070.

After Porgy and Bess was revived on Broadway in 1942, Decca brought the cast from the revival together to record more songs not already recorded two years earlier, issuing a new "Volume Two". This recording originally came on 3 ten-inch shellac records, which Decca Records assigned the numbers 23250, 23251 and 23252.

In February 1950, Decca re-released the albums on an LP set entitled Selections from Porgy and Bess (DL 7006), deceptively billing it as "the original cast album" though only selected members of two separate casts participated.

== Cast ==
- Todd Duncan (Porgy) (Sportin Life in "It Ain't Necessarily So")
- Anne Brown (Bess) (Clara in "Summertime") (Serena in "My Man's Gone Now")
- Avon Long (Sportin' Life)
- Edward Matthews (Jake)
- Helen Dowdy (Strawberry Woman)
- William Woolfolk (Crab Man)
- Georgette Harvey (Maria)
- Gladys Goode
- Eva Jessye Choir
- Decca Symphony Orchestra
- Alexander Smallens, conductor

== Track listing ==
Selections from George Gershwin's Folk Opera Porgy and Bess Volume 1 (1940) track listing
Track	Song Title
1.	"Overture" and "Summertime"
2.	"My Man's Gone Now"
3.	"I Got Plenty o' Nuttin'"
4.	"Buzzard Song"
5.	"Bess, You Is My Woman Now"
6.	"It Ain't Necessarily So"
7.	"The Requiem"
8.	"Porgy's Lament" and "Finale"

Selections from George Gershwin's Folk Opera Porgy and Bess Volume 2 (1942) track listing
Track	Song Title
1.	"A Woman Is a Sometime Thing"
2.	"It Take a Long Pull to Get There"
3.	"What You Want Wid Bess?"
4.	"Street Cries"
5.	"I Loves You, Porgy"
6.	"There's a Boat dat's Leavin' Soon for New York"

=== Combination LP (February 1950) ===
Selections from George Gershwin's Folk Opera Porgy and Bess combined volume (1950) track listing
Track	Song Title
1.	"Overture and Summertime"
2.	"A Woman Is a Sometime Thing"
3.	"My Man's Gone Now"
4.	"It Takes a Long Pull to Get There"
5.	"I Got Plenty o' Nuttin'"
6.	"Buzzard Song"
7.	"Bess, You Is My Woman"
8.	"It Ain't Necessarily So"
9.	"What You Want wid Bess?"
10.	"Strawberry Woman's Call"
11.	"Crab Man's Call"
12.	"I Loves You, Porgy"
13.	"The Requiem"
14.	"There's a Boat dat's Leavin' Soon for New York"
15.	"Porgy's Lament and Finale"
