= Porgy and Bess (Glyndebourne album) =

Studio album by various
- Released: 1989
- Recorded: February 1988
- Genre: Opera
- Length: 189:00
- Label: EMI Classics
- Producer: David R. Murray

Porgy and Bess is a recording of the Glyndebourne Festival Opera version of the George Gershwin opera of the same name. The cast were accompanied by the London Philharmonic Orchestra under the direction of Simon Rattle. The recording took place in February 1988 in No.1 Studio of Abbey Road in London. It was released in 1989.

The 1993 TV adaptation of Porgy and Bess used this recording as its soundtrack, and featured most of the original cast of the Glyndebourne production. Bruce Hubbard, who had died in 1991, did not appear, although his singing voice was heard as Jake, while Gordon Hawkins played the role onscreen. Likewise, soprano Harolyn Blackwell's voice was heard as Clara, although Paula Ingram played the role.

In the opinion of many critics, this version, along with the 1977 Houston Grand Opera recording, comes closest to the original opera as conceived by Gershwin, before the cuts made prior to the Broadway premiere.

== Cast ==
- Willard White as Porgy
- Cynthia Haymon as Bess
- Harolyn Blackwell as Clara
- Damon Evans as Sportin' Life
- Gregg Baker as Crown
- Cynthia Clarey as Serena
- Marietta Simpson as Maria
- Bruce Hubbard as Jake
- Colenton Freeman as Crab-man
- William Johnson as Frazier
- Curtis Watson as Jim
- Camellia Johnson as The Strawberry Woman
- The Glyndebourne Chorus
- The London Philharmonic Orchestra
- Sir Simon Rattle, conductor

Originally released as EMI #7-49568-2, it was reissued as EMI #7243-5-56220-2-0 in 1997. A one CD highlights version is available as EMI #0777-7-54325-2-7.

== Awards ==
- 1989 Gramophone Award for an operatic work
- 1990 International Record Critics' Award
- Caecilia Prijs
- Edison Stichting
- Penguin Guide
- Grand Prix du Disque of the Charles Cros Academy
