= Porgy and Bess (1951 album) =

Studio album by Various artists
- Released: 1951
- Recorded: April 1951
- Genre: Opera
- Length: 129 minutes
- Label: Columbia Masterworks
- Producer: Goddard Lieberson

Various artists chronology
Selections from George Gershwin's Folk Opera Porgy and Bess (1940)	Porgy and Bess (1951)

This 1951 recording of George Gershwin's opera Porgy and Bess was the first "complete" recording of the work from beginning to end, not a series of selections of popular songs from the work. (The recording did not include most of the music written by Gershwin which had been customarily cut from productions in the United States, however. As opposed to the complete three-hour opera, the album was two hours and nine minutes.)

The recording came about as a result of Lehman Engel and Goddard Lieberson's desire to record albums of Broadway shows whose scores had never been put on disc. Among the musicals the team had recorded (or would record) were Oh, Kay! (1926), Babes in Arms (1937), Girl Crazy (1930), and Pal Joey (1940). Although there had been an album of Porgy and Bess since 1940, there had never been a 3-LP version. The 1951 album set contained more than two-thirds of the opera, for the first time ever in the history of recording.

The album was recorded between April 5 and April 13, 1951.

The album was originally released on 3 twelve-inch 33 1/3 rpm LPs. Columbia Masterworks assigned the album the catalog number OSL 162. The recording was later remastered by Naxos Records and re-released on CD.

Several members of the original Broadway cast of Porgy and Bess appeared on the album.

== Cast ==
- Lawrence Winters, baritone (Porgy)
- Camilla Williams, soprano (Bess)
- Warren Coleman, baritone (Crown)
- Avon Long, tenor (Sportin' Life)
- Inez Matthews, soprano (Serena)
- Harrison Cattenhead, tenor (Peter)
- Hubert Dilworth, baritone (Undertaker)
- Helen Dowdy, mezzo-soprano (Maria/Lily/Strawberry Woman)
- George Fisher, baritone (Jim)
- William A. Glover, tenor (Mingo)
- Eddie Matthews, baritone (Jake)
- Sadie McGill, mezzo-soprano (Annie)
- June McMechen, soprano (Clara)
- Irving Washington, tenor (Robbins)
- Ray Yeats, tenor (Nelson/Crab Man)
- J. Rosamond Johnson (Frazier)
- Robert Carroll (Mr. Archdale)
- George Matthews (Detective)
- Peter Van Zant (Police Officer/Coroner)
- J. Rosamond Johnson Chorus
- Pickup orchestra
- Lehman Engel, conductor
