= Warren Coleman =

American opera singer

- Born: 24 August 1900
- Died: 13 January 1968 (aged 67); West Tisbury, Massachusetts, Martha's Vineyard
- Occupation: operatic baritone

Warren Coleman (24 August 1900 – 13 January 1968 in West Tisbury, Martha's Vineyard) was an American operatic baritone. He created the roles of Crown in George Gershwin's Porgy and Bess and the role of John Kumalo in Kurt Weill's Lost in the Stars, in the premieres of each show on Broadway.

Coleman performed regularly on the Broadway stage from 1934 until 1950. In addition to Lost in the Stars and two productions of Porgy and Bess, Coleman also starred in Roll, Sweet Chariot, Sing Out the News, and Anna Lucasta.
