= Alvy Powell =

American opera singer

- Born: October 31, 1955 (age 70); Birdsnest, Virginia
- Military career
- Allegiance: United States
- Branch: Army
- Service years: 1983–2017
- Rank: Master sergeant
- Unit: United States Army Band
- Other work: Opera singer

Alvy R. Powell Jr (born October 31, 1955) is an American bass-baritone opera singer and a former member of the U.S. Army Chorus. He is known for his performances at presidential events and for performing the role of Porgy in the George Gershwin opera Porgy and Bess. Before his retirement from the military in 2017, Powell was the oldest enlisted soldier in the Army.

In 2015, Powell received the National Medal of Arts from President Barack Obama.

== Early life ==
Powell was born in Birdsnest, Virginia. He grew up in Cheriton, Virginia; he had four older sisters, and he said that they were instrumental in getting him interested in music. He grew up singing gospel music at the African Baptist Church. He said that from an early age he was encouraged by church members who recognized his vocal abilities.

Powell remembers that at age 14 he was inspired by a recording of William Warfield singing the part of Porgy in the George Gershwin opera Porgy and Bess. "I had never seen anyone black in something so classical. I knew it was right for me. I said I was going to sing it some day," he said later. He attended Northampton High School, graduating in 1974. He went on a musical tour of Europe the following year after hearing about it from his high school chorus teacher.

Later, Powell worked as a prison guard, as a baggage handler for an airline, and as a disc jockey. He studied at Virginia State University and Indiana University before enrolling at the University of Maryland, where he was mentored by George Shirley, who had been the first black tenor with the Metropolitan Opera in New York. Powell also sang at a dinner theater in Washington, D.C., where he received encouragement from other singers that led to his auditioning for the U.S. Army Chorus.

== Musical career ==
In 1983, Powell joined the U.S. Army Chorus after his graduation from the University of Maryland, where he earned a voice degree. Four years later, he received approval to travel to Australia to perform the role of Porgy in productions of Porgy and Bess in Melbourne and Sydney. At that time, Powell was classified as a staff sergeant; he described himself as an ordinary soldier. "We are taught to march, do our drill and carry a rifle. What is different is that we are on call 24 hours a day to sing at VIP functions," he said. He left the chorus in 1993 and spent several years singing around the world before rejoining the organization in 2001.

Powell performed for several U.S. presidents and numerous dignitaries from other countries. Gerald Ford was particularly fond of Powell's performances of "Ol' Man River", and Powell sang solos at Ford's funeral and at the rededication of the Gerald R. Ford Presidential Library. He also performed the national anthem a cappella at the inauguration of George H. W. Bush in 1989. Powell had been selected for the task by First Lady Barbara Bush; he had performed at the couple's Christmas parties in years past.

Powell became especially known for his work in opera, and he continued to make appearances in operas even after returning to the Army. He became well known for singing the role of Porgy, reprising the role more than 2500 times. Powell appeared at Carnegie Hall in 2008, singing the part of Joe in Show Boat, and returned in 2009 as Porgy. He played King Balthazar in a BBC television production of Amahl and the Night Visitors.

In 2015, Powell was awarded the National Medal of Arts by President Barack Obama. George Shirley was also awarded the medal that year.

As of 2017, Powell was the Army's oldest enlisted soldier. That year he announced that he would retire on October 31, his 62nd birthday. A retirement celebration involving the U.S. Army Chorus, to be held in Cheriton, was planned for September 2017.

== Personal life ==
Powell met his second wife, Gina, through his work. She was also a singer and they met at an opera house. She died in 2015. Powell had a son in 1987 Alvy Rolland Powell, III by his first wife Sheila.
