= I Got Plenty o' Nuttin' =

Aria from Gerwhwin's opera Porgy and Bess

"I Got Plenty o' Nuttin'" is a bass-baritone aria sung by the character Porgy from George Gershwin's 1935 "folk-opera" Porgy and Bess. The lyrics are by DuBose Heyward, the author of the novel Porgy on which the opera is based, and Ira Gershwin. It is one of the most famous arias from the opera (along with "Summertime", "It Ain't Necessarily So", and "Bess, You Is My Woman Now") and it has been recorded by hundreds of singers and music groups.

The aria expresses a cheerful acceptance of poverty as freedom from worldly cares. Porgy says he has the most important things in life, "'Cause de things dat I prize, / Like de stars in de skies / All are free". Most of all, he sings, "got my gal, got my Lord, got my song".

== Porgy and Bess ==
Porgy sings the aria in act 2 after he and Bess have been living together, expressing his new happiness. Like several other arias in the opera, it is implied that it is being performed by the singer to the other characters, in this case as a banjo song. As elsewhere in the opera, other characters join in to create communal engagement with song. In the view of Joseph Horowitz, Gershwin made "a banjo song with choral interjections, a community moment".

There is a short reprise of the song at the end of the act, as Porgy sings cheerfully to himself after Bess has left on her fateful trip to Kittiwah Island.

The principal musical phrase also appears later in the score as a leitmotif signifying Porgy's joyful feelings, most extensively when Porgy returns after being released from prison. At the very end, a fragment of the principal phrase appears at the beginning of the final aria, "Oh Lawd, I'm on my way", to signal Porgy's renewed optimism and potential happiness as he sets out to find Bess.

== Creation ==
The aria originated from Gershwin's suggestion that a light moment was needed at that point in the second act. Unusually, he sketched the tune before the lyrics were written, playing a rough version on the piano at a meeting with the opera's lyricists, his brother Ira Gershwin and DuBose Heyward. Ira came up with the title "I Got Plenty o' Nuttin'". Heyward then asked Ira if he could draft out the aria, as he had never written words to an existing tune before. A 'dummy' lyric was created by Ira and Heywood's wife Dorothy—with nonsense words to help him remember the required rhythm for the tune. Heywood sent his rough draft to Ira, which Ira thought "had many useable lines", but was "awkward when sung". Ira polished it into a more singable form, while George perfected the music. Ira considered the lyrics to be a "50–50 collaborative effort".

The original orchestration introduced a banjo, which was used for "lightly sounding the vamp-like chords against the tuneful and exuberant melody of the soloist". It has been noted that both the tune and the lyrics bear a significant resemblance to the Gershwin brothers' earlier hit "I Got Rhythm".

== Versions ==
The song has been covered by many musicians since its performance by Todd Duncan at the opera's premiere in 1935. Some of the most notable performers included Bing Crosby (recorded March 29, 1936), Aaron Bridgers (1950), Ella Fitzgerald and Louis Armstrong (1957), Frank Sinatra (1957), Pearl Bailey (1959), Carol Kidd (1994). Robert McFerrin sang the role of Porgy, played by Sidney Poitier, in the 1959 film.

The official spelling of the title is not used in many of the cover versions. It is varied in numerous different ways, including "Oh, I Got Plenty o' Nuttin" (Monica Zetterlund, 1959), "I Got Plenty of Nothin'" (Diahann Carroll, 1959), and the fully standard English "I've Got Plenty of Nothing" (Julia Migenes, 1989).
