= Porgy and Bess =

1935 opera by George Gershwin

- Opera by George Gershwin
- Boston try-out before the Broadway opening
- Librettist: DuBose Heyward
- Language: English
- Based on: Heyward's novel Porgy
- Premiere: September 30, 1935; Colonial Theatre (Boston)

Porgy and Bess (/ˈpɔːrɡi/ PORG-ee) is an English-language opera by American composer George Gershwin, with a libretto written by author DuBose Heyward and lyricist Ira Gershwin. It was adapted from Dorothy Heyward and DuBose Heyward's play Porgy, itself an adaptation of DuBose Heyward's 1925 novel Porgy.

Porgy and Bess was first performed in Boston on September 30, 1935, before it moved to Broadway in New York City. It featured a cast of classically trained African-American singers—a daring artistic choice at the time. A 1976 Houston Grand Opera production gained it a renewed popularity, and it is now one of the best known and most frequently performed operas.

The libretto of Porgy and Bess tells the story of Porgy, a disabled black street beggar living in the slums of Charleston. It deals with his attempts to rescue Bess from the clutches of Crown, her violent and possessive lover, and Sportin' Life, her drug dealer. The opera plot generally follows the stage play.

In the years following Gershwin's death, Porgy and Bess was adapted for smaller-scale performances. It was adapted as a film in 1959. Some of the songs in the opera, such as "Summertime", became popular and are frequently recorded. In the late 20th and early 21st centuries, the trend has been toward productions with greater fidelity to Gershwin's original intentions, though smaller-scale productions also continue to be mounted. A complete recorded version of the score was released in 1976; since then, it has been recorded several times.

== Inception ==
The origin of Porgy and Bess is DuBose Heyward's 1925 novel Porgy. Heyward produced a play by the same name with Dorothy Heyward.

George Gershwin read Porgy in 1926 and proposed to Heyward to collaborate on an operatic version. In 1934, Gershwin and Heyward began work on the project by visiting the author's native Charleston, South Carolina. In a 1935 New York Times article, Gershwin explained his motivation for calling Porgy and Bess a folk opera:

Porgy and Bess is a folk tale. Its people naturally would sing folk music. When I first began work on the music I decided against the use of original folk material because I wanted the music to be all of one piece. Therefore I wrote my own spirituals and folksongs. But they are still folk music—and therefore, being in operatic form, Porgy and Bess becomes a folk opera.

== Composition history ==
In the fall of 1933 Gershwin and Heyward signed a contract with the Theatre Guild to write the opera. In the summer of 1934 Gershwin and Heyward went to Folly Beach, South Carolina (a small island near Charleston), where Gershwin got a feel for the locale and its music. He worked on the opera there and in New York. Ira Gershwin, in New York, wrote lyrics to some of the opera's classic songs, most notably "It Ain't Necessarily So". Most of the lyrics, including "Summertime", were written by Heyward, who also wrote the libretto.

== Performance history ==
=== 1935 original Broadway production ===
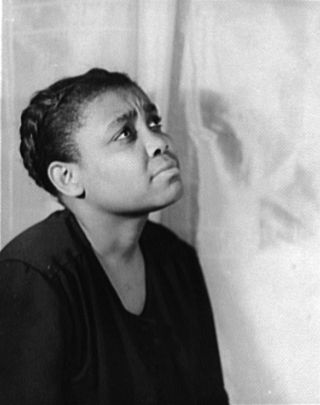
Ruby Elzy as Serena in the original Broadway production of Porgy and Bess (1935)

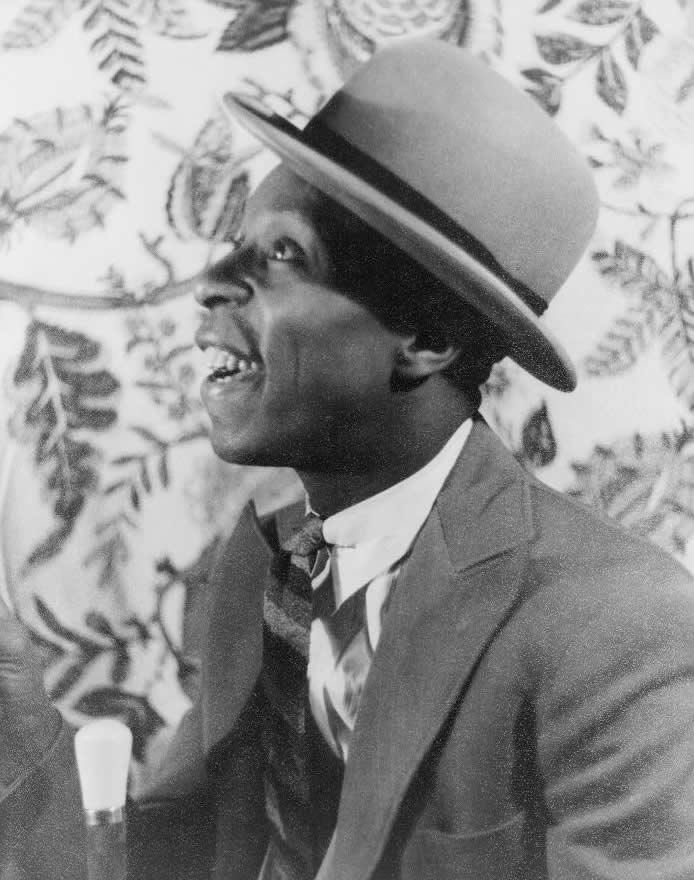
John W. Bubbles as Sportin' Life in the original Broadway production of Porgy and Bess (1935)

Gershwin's first version of the opera, running four hours (counting the two intermissions), was performed privately in a concert version in Carnegie Hall, in the fall of 1935. He chose as his choral director Eva Jessye, who also directed her own renowned choir. The world premiere performance took place at the Colonial Theatre in Boston on September 30, 1935—the try-out for a work intended initially for Broadway where the opening took place at the Alvin Theatre in New York City on October 10, 1935. During rehearsals and in Boston, Gershwin made many cuts and refinements to shorten the running time and tighten the dramatic action. The run on Broadway lasted 124 performances. The production and direction were entrusted to Rouben Mamoulian, who had previously directed the Broadway productions of Heyward's play Porgy. The music director was Alexander Smallens.

The leading roles were played by Todd Duncan and Anne Brown. Brown was a 20-year-old student at Juilliard, the first African-American vocalist admitted there; when she read that George Gershwin was going to write a musical version of Porgy, she wrote him and asked to sing for him, and Gershwin's secretary invited her. Gershwin was impressed and began asking Brown to come and sing the songs as he composed them for Porgy. The character of Bess was originally a secondary character, but as Gershwin was impressed with Brown's singing, he expanded the part of Bess and cast Brown. When they had completed rehearsals and were ready to begin previews, Gershwin invited Brown to join him for lunch. At that meeting, he told her, "I want you to know, Miss Brown, that henceforth and forever after, George Gershwin's opera will be known as Porgy and Bess." Influential vaudeville artist John W. Bubbles created the role of Sportin' Life; the role of Serena was created by Ruby Elzy.

After the Broadway run, a tour started on January 27, 1936, in Philadelphia and traveled to Pittsburgh and Chicago before ending in Washington, DC, on March 21, 1936. During the Washington run, the cast—as led by Todd Duncan—protested segregation at the National Theatre. Eventually management gave in to the demands, resulting in the first integrated audience for a performance of any show at that venue.

In 1938, many of the original cast reunited for a West Coast revival that played in Los Angeles and at the Curran Theatre in San Francisco. Avon Long took on the role of Sportin' Life for the first time, a role he continued to play in many productions over a long career.

=== 1942 Broadway revival ===
Noted director and producer Cheryl Crawford produced professional stock theater in Maplewood, New Jersey, for three very successful seasons. The last of these closed with Porgy and Bess, which she co-produced with John Wildberg. In refashioning it in the style of musical theater which Americans were used to hearing from Gershwin, Crawford produced a drastically cut version of the opera compared with the first Broadway staging. The orchestra was reduced, the cast was halved, and many recitatives were reduced to spoken dialog.

Having seen the performance, theater owner Lee Shubert arranged for Crawford to bring her production to Broadway. The show opened at the Majestic Theatre in January 1942. Duncan and Brown reprised their roles as the title characters, with Alexander Smallens again conducting. In June, contralto Etta Moten, whom Gershwin had first envisioned as Bess, replaced Brown in the role. Moten was such a success that Bess became her signature role. The Crawford production ran for nine months and was far more successful financially than the original.

Radio station WOR in New York broadcast a live one-hour version on May 7, 1942. The cast included Todd Duncan, Anne Brown, Ruby Elzy, Eloise C. Uggams, Avon Long, Edward Matthews, Harriet Jackson, Georgette Harvey, Jack Carr, and the Eva Jessye Choir; the WOR Symphony was conducted by Alfred Wallenstein. The 12-inch-diameter 78 rpm, glass base, lacquer-coated disks were transferred to open-reel tape on February 6, 1975.

=== European premieres ===
On March 27, 1943, the opera had its European premiere at the Royal Danish Theatre in Copenhagen. Performed during the Nazi occupation of the country, this performance was notable for being performed by an all-white cast made up in blackface. After 22 sold-out performances, the Nazis forced the theater to close the production. Other all- or mostly white productions in Europe, reflecting contemporary demographics in the countries, took place in Zürich, Switzerland, in 1945 and 1950, and Gothenburg and Stockholm, Sweden, in 1948.

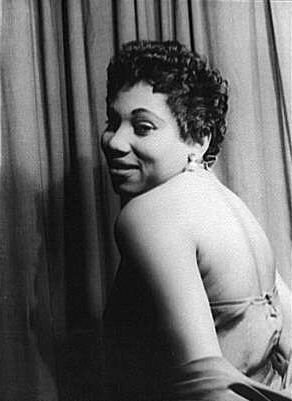
Leontyne Price as Bess

=== 1952 touring production ===
Blevins Davis and Robert Breen produced a revival in 1952 which restored much of the music cut in the Crawford version, including many of the recitatives. It divided the opera into two acts, with the intermission occurring after Crown forces Bess to stay on Kittiwah Island. This version restored the work to a more operatic form, though not all of the recitatives were retained. In this version, Porgy and Bess was warmly received throughout Europe. The London premiere took place on October 9, 1952, at the Stoll Theatre where the opera continued until February 10, 1953.

This production's original cast featured Americans Leontyne Price as Bess, William Warfield as Porgy, and Cab Calloway as Sportin' Life, a role that Gershwin had composed with him in mind. The role of Ruby was played by a young Maya Angelou. Price and Warfield met and wed while on the tour. The role of Porgy was the first for Warfield after his appearance as Joe singing "Ol' Man River" in the popular 1951 MGM film of Show Boat.

After a tour of Europe financed by the United States Department of State, the production came to Broadway's Ziegfeld Theatre in March 1953. It later toured North America. After completing its North American run in Montreal, the company embarked on an international tour, with LeVern Hutcherson as Porgy and Gloria Davy as Bess. The production first performed in Venice, Paris, and London, and in other cities in Austria, Belgium, Germany, Greece, Italy, Switzerland, and Yugoslavia. The company also made a stop at the Cairo Opera House in Egypt in January 1955. In 1955–1956 the company toured in cities in the Middle East, Africa, Russia, and Latin America.

During this tour, Porgy and Bess was presented for the first time at La Scala in Milan in February 1955. A historic yet tense premiere took place in Leningrad in December 1955; it was during the Cold War and the first time an American theater group had been to the Soviet capital since the Bolshevik Revolution. Author Truman Capote traveled with the cast and crew, and wrote an account included in his book The Muses Are Heard.

=== 1965 New Zealand Opera production ===
This 1965 production by New Zealand Opera included several Māori opera singers, deemed by the Gershwin trust to be consistent with the requirement for black artists as the cast. The experience of working with a Broadway musical director, Ella Gerber, and being in the cast (from chorus to a minor character role) was a unique opportunity for New Zealand opera singers.

=== 1965 Volksoper Vienna production ===
As opposed to the American productions from 1942 up until 1976, the 1965 Volksoper production was performed as an opera as George Gershwin conceived it and was based on the original 1935-Broadway production, i.e., restoring the sung recitatives as well as opening cuts similar to 1935. The conductor and stage director were Americans, and the lead roles as well as most small parts were sung by Black-Americans. Only the chorus was the Volksoper's own white chorus. The Volksoper orchestra used the original instrumentation, though its string section was larger than the original Broadway. The production was revived several times up into the first half of the 1970's

=== 1976 Houston Grand Opera production ===
During the 1960s and early 1970s, Porgy and Bess mostly languished on the shelves, a victim of its perceived racism. Though new productions took place in 1961 and 1964, along with a Vienna Volksoper premiere in 1965 (again with William Warfield as Porgy), these did little to change many African Americans' opinions of the work. Many music critics still had not accepted it as a true opera.

A new staging of Porgy and Bess was produced by the Houston Grand Opera in 1976, directed by Jack O'Brien with musical direction by John DeMain; it restored the complete original score for the first time. Following its debut in Houston, the production opened on Broadway at the Uris Theatre on September 25, 1976, and was recorded complete by RCA Records. This version was very influential in turning the tide of opinion about the work.

For the first time, an American opera company, not a Broadway production company, had tackled the opera. This production was based on Gershwin's original full score. It did not incorporate the cuts and other changes that Gershwin had made before the New York premiere, nor the ones made for the 1942 Cheryl Crawford revival or the 1959 film version. It allowed the public to take in the operatic whole as first envisioned by the composer. In this light, Porgy and Bess was accepted as an opera. Donnie Ray Albert and Robert Mosley alternated performances in the role of Porgy. Clamma Dale and Larry Marshall starred, respectively, as Bess and Sportin' Life. This production won the Houston Grand Opera a Tony Award—the only opera ever to receive one—and a 1978 Grammy Award for Best Opera Recording. The conductor was John DeMain.

=== Subsequent productions ===
Another Broadway production was staged in 1983 at Radio City Music Hall with conductor C. William Harwood, based on the Houston production.

The Metropolitan Opera presented a production of Porgy and Bess in 1985 after considering it since the 1930s. It opened February 6, 1985, with a cast including Simon Estes, Grace Bumbry, Bruce Hubbard, Gregg Baker and Florence Quivar. The Met production was directed by Nathaniel Merrill and designed by Robert O'Hearn. The conductor was James Levine. The production received 16 performances in its first season and was revived in 1986, 1989 and 1990, for a total of 54 performances.

Trevor Nunn first tackled the work in an acclaimed 1986 production at England's Glyndebourne Festival. The 1986 Trevor Nunn production was scenically expanded and videotaped for television in 1993 (see below in "Television"). These productions were also based on the "complete score," without incorporating Gershwin's revisions. A semi-staged version of this production was performed at the Proms in 1998.

In 1995, the Houston Grand Opera launched a new tour of Porgy and Bess that travelled to ten cities with co-producing opera companies: Cleveland, Dallas, Irvine, Los Angeles, Miami, Minneapolis, Portland, San Diego, San Francisco, Seattle; and Japan in 1996. The two-million dollar production included cast members Marquita Lister, Alvy Powell, Terry Cook, Larry Marshall, and Stacey Robinson; musical conductor John DeMain; and director and choreographer Hope Clarke, who became the first African American to direct a professional U.S. staging of Porgy and Bess.

The centennial celebration of the Gershwin brothers from 1996 to 1998 included a new production as well. On February 24–25, 2006, the Nashville Symphony, under the direction of John Mauceri, gave a concert performance at the Tennessee Performing Arts Center. It incorporated Gershwin's cuts made for the New York premiere, thus giving the audience an idea of what the opera sounded like on its Broadway opening. In 2000 and 2002 the New York City Opera had a revival directed by Tazewell Thompson. In 2007, Los Angeles Opera staged a revival directed by Francesca Zambello and conducted by John DeMain, who led the history-making Houston Opera revival of Porgy and Bess in 1976.

South Africa's Cape Town Opera has frequently performed Porgy and Bess abroad, most notably with the Welsh National Opera, NorrlandsOperan, Deutsche Oper Berlin and at the Wales Millennium Centre, Royal Festival Hall and Edinburgh Festival Theatre. In October 2010, its planned tour of the opera to Israel was criticized by Desmond Tutu.

=== 2006 The Gershwins' Porgy and Bess (Nunn adaptation) ===
The Gershwins' Porgy and Bess premiered on November 9, 2006, at the Savoy Theatre (London), directed by Trevor Nunn. (Although that was the title given to this production, the 1993 television adaptation of Nunn's 1986 production had also used it.) For this new production, he adapted the lengthy opera to fit the conventions of musical theater. Working with the Gershwin and Heyward estates, Nunn used dialogue from the original novel and subsequent Broadway stage play to replace the recitatives with naturalistic scenes. He did not use operatic voices in this production, but relied on musical theater actors and actresses as leads. Gareth Valentine provided the musical adaptation. Despite mostly positive reviews, Nunn's production closed months early because of poor box office returns.

This original cast of this version included Clarke Peters as Porgy, Nicola Hughes as Bess, O. T. Fagbenle as Sportin' Life, and Cornell S. John as Crown.

=== 2011 The Gershwins' Porgy and Bess (Paulus adaptation) ===
Another production titled The Gershwins' Porgy and Bess, directed by Diane Paulus with book adapted by Suzan-Lori Parks and music adapted by Diedre Murray, was presented by the American Repertory Theater (ART) in Cambridge, Massachusetts. The Broadway production was produced by Buddy Freitag and Barbara Freitag. Previews started August 17, and the show opened August 31, 2011. Following Trevor Nunn's latest production of the work, the ART Porgy was the second production initiated by the Gershwin and Heyward estates to adapt the opera for the musical theater stage. Again spoken dialogue, here written by Parks, replaced the opera's sung recitatives. William David Brohn and Christopher Jahnke created new orchestrations for the production.

Before the opening, Paulus, Parks and Murray made statements to the press about the production's primary goal being to "introduce the work to the next generation of theatergoers". They discussed changes to the opera's plot, dialogue and score that were being explored to make the work more appealing to a contemporary audience. In response, esteemed Broadway composer Stephen Sondheim wrote a blistering letter to the New York Times criticizing Paulus, McDonald and Parks' "disdain... toward the opera itself" and criticized the new title '"as just dumb" because it underplayed the contribution of Heyward. The complete text of Sondheim's letter may be seen at this link. Critic Hilton Als countered in The New Yorker that Sondheim had very little exposure to black culture and that the Paulus version succeeded in "humanizing the depiction of race onstage."

The production began previews on Broadway at the Richard Rodgers Theatre in December 2011 and officially opened on January 12, 2012. The original cast included Audra McDonald as Bess, Norm Lewis as Porgy, David Alan Grier as Sportin' Life, Phillip Boykin as Crown, Nikki Renee Daniels as Clara, and Joshua Henry as Jake. All of the major roles are played by the same cast as in Cambridge.

Early reviews of the show were positive to mixed. All praised McDonald's performance of Bess, but critics were divided on the success of the adaptation, staging and setting. Some praised the intimate scale of the drama and the believability of the performances; others found the staging to be unfocused and the settings to lack atmosphere. Time magazine ranked the show as its number two choice among theater productions in 2011.

The production was nominated for 10 awards in the 2012 Tony Awards, winning Best Revival of a Musical and Best Performance by a Leading Actress in a Musical for McDonald. The production ran through September 23, 2012. It played 322 performances, 17 more than the 1953 revival, making it the longest-running production of Porgy and Bess on Broadway thus far.

=== 2014 The Gershwins' Porgy and Bess (London production) ===
This production ran at the Regent's Park Open Air Theatre from July 17 to August 23. Cast members included Rufus Bonds Jr (Porgy), Nicola Hughes (Bess), Cedric Neal (Sportin' Life), Phillip Boykin (Crown), Sharon D. Clarke (Mariah), Jade Ewen (Clara) and Golda Rosheuvel (Serena). The production was directed by Timothy Sheader, and also used the book adapted by Suzan-Lori Parks, but used a new arrangement of the score by David Shrubsole. It was nominated at the Olivier Awards for Best Musical Revival.

=== 2019 Metropolitan Opera production ===
After an absence of nearly thirty years on the Met stage, the company staged the new London production conducted by David Robertson in Fall 2019. It featured a cast including Golda Schultz, Latonia Moore, Angel Blue, Elizabeth Llewellyn, Denyce Graves, Eric Owens, Frederick Ballentine, Alfred Walker, and Ryan Speedo Green.

The production was hailed as "splendid" by The New York Times. A live cast album, released on December 17, 2019, won a Grammy Award for Best Opera Recording at the 63rd Annual Grammy Awards.

== Roles ==
Roles, voice types, premiere cast
Role	Voice type	Premiere cast, September 30, 1935 Conductor: Alexander Smallens
Porgy, a disabled beggar	bass-baritone	Todd Duncan
Bess, Crown's girl	soprano	Anne Brown
Crown, a tough stevedore	baritone	Warren Coleman
Sportin' Life, a dope peddler	tenor	John W. Bubbles
Robbins, an inhabitant of Catfish Row	tenor	Henry Davis
Serena, Robbins' wife	soprano	Ruby Elzy
Jake, a fisherman	baritone	Edward Matthews
Clara, Jake's wife	soprano	Abbie Mitchell
Maria, keeper of the cook-shop	contralto	Georgette Harvey
Mingo	tenor	Ford L. Buck
Peter, the honeyman	tenor	Gus Simons
Lily, Peter's wife	soprano	Helen Dowdy
Frazier, a black "lawyer"	baritone	J. Rosamond Johnson
Annie	mezzo-soprano	Olive Ball
Strawberry woman	mezzo-soprano	Helen Dowdy
Jim, a stevedore who hauls cotton	baritone	Jack Carr
Undertaker	baritone	John Garth
Nelson	tenor	Ray Yeates
Crab man	tenor	Ray Yeates
Scipio, a small boy	boy soprano	
Mr. Archdale, a white lawyer	spoken	George Lessey
Detective	spoken	Alexander Campbell
Policeman	spoken	Burton McEvilly
Coroner	spoken	George Carleton
The Eva Jessye Choir, led by Eva Jessye

With the exception of a few speaking roles, all of the characters are black.

== Synopsis ==
Place: Catfish Row, a fictitious large black tenement based on Cabbage Row, on the waterfront of Charleston, South Carolina.
Time: The early 1920s.

=== Act 1 ===
Scene 1: Catfish Row, a summer evening

The opera begins with a short introduction which segues into an evening in Catfish Row. Jasbo Brown entertains the community with his piano playing. Clara, a young mother, sings a lullaby to her baby ("Summertime") as the working men prepare for a game of craps ("Roll them Bones"). One of the players, Robbins, scorns his wife Serena's demands that he not play, retorting that on a Saturday night, a man has the right to play. Clara's husband, the fisherman Jake, tries his own lullaby ("A Woman is a Sometime Thing") with little effect. Little by little, other characters in the opera enter Catfish Row, among them Mingo, another fisherman, and Jim, a cotton-hauling stevedore who, tired of his job, decides to give it up and join Jake and the other fishermen. Porgy, a disabled beggar, enters on his goat cart to organize the game. Peter, an elderly "honey man" [honey vendor] returns, singing his vendor's call. Crown, a strong and brutal stevedore, storms in with his woman, Bess, and buys cheap whiskey and some "happy dust" off the local dope peddler, Sportin' Life. Bess is shunned by the women of the community, especially the pious Serena and the matriarchal cookshop owner Maria, but Porgy softly defends her. The game begins. One by one, the players get crapped out, leaving only Robbins and Crown, who has become extremely drunk. When Robbins wins, Crown attempts to prevent him from taking his winnings. A brawl ensues, which ends when Crown stabs Robbins with Jim's cotton hook, killing him. Crown runs, telling Bess to fend for herself but that he will be back for her when the heat dies down. Sportin' Life gives her a dose of happy dust and offers to take her with him when he goes to New York, but she rejects him. He flees, and Bess begins to pound on doors, but is rejected by all of the residents of Catfish Row, with the exception of Porgy, who lets her in.

Scene 2: Serena's Room, the following night

The mourners sing a spiritual to Robbins ("Gone, Gone, Gone"). To raise money for his burial, a saucer is placed on his chest for the mourners' donations ("Overflow"). Bess enters with Porgy and attempts to donate to the burial fund, but Serena rejects her money until Bess explains that she is now living with Porgy. A white detective enters and coldly tells Serena that she must bury her husband the next day, or his body will be given to medical students (for dissection). He suddenly accuses Peter of Robbins's murder. Peter denies his guilt and says Crown was the murderer. The Detective orders Peter to be arrested as a material witness, whom he will force to testify against Crown. Serena laments her loss in "My Man's Gone Now". The undertaker enters. The saucer holds only fifteen dollars of the needed twenty-five, but he agrees to bury Robbins as long as Serena promises to pay him back. Bess, who has been sitting in silence slightly apart from the rest of those gathered, suddenly begins to sing a gospel song and the chorus joyfully join in, welcoming her into the community. ("Oh, the Train is at de Station")

=== Act 2 ===
Scene 1: Catfish Row, a month later, in the morning

Jake and the other fishermen prepare for work ("It take a long pull to get there"). Clara asks Jake not to go because it is time for the annual storms, but he tells her that they desperately need the money. This causes Porgy to sing from his window about his new, happy-go-lucky outlook on life. ("I Got Plenty o' Nuttin'"). Sportin' Life waltzes around selling "happy dust", but soon incurs the wrath of Maria, who threatens him. ("I hates yo' struttin' style"). A fraudulent lawyer, Frazier, arrives and farcically divorces Bess from Crown. When he discovers Bess and Crown were not married, he raises his price from a dollar to a dollar and a half. Archdale, a white lawyer, enters and informs Porgy that Peter will soon be released. The bad omen of a buzzard flies over Catfish Row and Porgy demands that it leave now that he finally has found happiness. ("Buzzard keep on flyin' over".)

As the rest of Catfish Row prepares for the church picnic on nearby Kittiwah Island, Sportin' Life again offers to take Bess to New York with him; she refuses. He attempts to give her some "happy dust" despite her claims that she's given up drugs, but Porgy grabs his arm and scares him off. Sportin' Life leaves, reminding Bess as he goes that her men friends come and go, but he will be there all along. Bess and Porgy are now left alone, and express their love for each other ("Bess, You Is My Woman Now"). The chorus re-enters in high spirits as they prepare to leave for the picnic ("Oh, I can't sit down"). Bess is invited to the picnic by Maria, but she demurs as Porgy cannot come (due to his disability, he cannot get on the boat), but Maria insists. Bess leaves Porgy behind as they go off to the picnic. Porgy watches the boat leave ("I got plenty o' nuttin" reprise).

Scene 2: Kittiwah Island, that evening

The chorus enjoys themselves at the picnic ("I ain't got no shame"). Sportin' Life presents the chorus his cynical views on the Bible ("It Ain't Necessarily So"), causing Serena to chastise them ("Shame on all you sinners!"). Everyone gets ready to leave. As Bess, who has lagged behind, tries to follow them, Crown emerges from the bushes. He reminds her that Porgy is "temporary" and laughs off her claims that she has been living decently now. Bess wants to leave Crown forever and attempts to make him forget about her ("Oh, what you want wid Bess?") but Crown refuses to give her up. He grabs her and will not let her go to the boat, which leaves without her, and then forcefully kisses her. He laughs at his conquest as her resistance begins to fail, and commands her to get into the woods, where his intentions are only too clear.

Scene 3: Catfish Row, a week later, just before dawn

A week later, Jake leaves to go fishing with his crew, one of whom observes that it looks as if a storm is coming in. Peter, still unsure of his crime, returns from prison. Meanwhile, Bess is lying in Porgy's room delirious with fever, which she has had ever since returning from Kittiwah Island. Serena prays to remove Bess's affliction ("Oh, Doctor Jesus"), and promises Porgy that Bess will be well by five o'clock. As the day passes, a strawberry woman, Peter (the Honey Man) and a crab man each pass by with their wares ("Vendors' Trio"). As the clock chimes five, Bess recovers from her fever. Porgy tells Bess that he knows she has been with Crown, and she admits that Crown has promised to return for her. Porgy tells her she is free to go if she wants to, and she tells him that although she wants to stay ("I Wants to Stay Here"), she is afraid of Crown's hold on her. Porgy asks her what would happen if there was no Crown, and Bess tells Porgy she loves him and begs him to protect her. Porgy promises that she will never have to be afraid again ("I Loves You, Porgy").

Clara watches the water, fearful for Jake. Maria tries to allay her fears, but suddenly the hurricane bell begins to ring.

Scene 4: Serena's Room, dawn of the next day

The residents of Catfish Row are all gathered in Serena's room for shelter from the hurricane. They drown out the sound of the storm with prayers and hymns ("Oh, Doctor Jesus") while Sportin' Life mocks their assumption that the storm is a signal of Judgment Day. Clara desperately sings her lullaby ("Summertime" [reprise]). A knock is heard at the door, and the chorus believes it to be Death ("Oh there's somebody knocking at the door"). Crown enters dramatically, having swum from Kittiwah Island, seeking Bess. He shows no fear of God, claiming that after the long struggle from Kittiwah, God and he are friends. The chorus tries to drown out his blaspheming with more prayer, and he taunts them by singing a vulgar song ("A red-headed woman"). Suddenly, Clara sees Jake's boat float past the window, upside-down, and she runs out to try to save him, handing her baby to Bess. Bess asks that one of the men go out with her, and Crown taunts Porgy, who cannot go. Crown goes himself, yelling out as he leaves "Alright, Big Friend! We're on for another Bout!" The chorus continue to pray as the storm rises.

=== Act 3 ===
Scene 1: Catfish Row, the next night

A group of women mourn Clara, Jake, and all of those who have been killed in the storm ("Clara, Clara, don't you be downhearted"). When they begin to mourn for Crown as well, Sportin' Life laughs at them and is told off by Maria. He insinuates that Crown may not be dead, and observes that when a woman has a man, maybe she's got him for keeps, but if she has two men, then it's highly likely she'll end up with none. Bess is heard singing Clara's lullaby to her baby, whom she is now taking care of. ("Summertime" [reprise]). Once Catfish Row is dark, Crown stealthily enters to claim Bess, but is confronted by Porgy. A fight ensues that ends when Porgy kills Crown. Porgy exclaims to Bess, "You've got a man now. You've got Porgy!"

Scene 2: Catfish Row, the next afternoon

The detective enters and talks with Serena and her friends about the murders of Crown and Robbins. They deny knowledge of Crown's murder, frustrating the detective. Needing a witness for the coroner's inquest, he next questions an apprehensive Porgy. Once Porgy admits to knowing Crown, he is ordered to come and identify Crown's body. Sportin' Life tells Porgy that corpses bleed in the presence of their murderers, and the detective will use this to hang Porgy. Porgy refuses to identify the body, but is dragged off anyway. Bess is distraught, and Sportin' Life puts his plan into action. He tells her that Porgy will be locked up for a long time, and points out that he is the only one still here. He offers her happy dust, and though she refuses, he forces it on her. After she takes a whiff, he paints a seductive picture of her life with him in New York ("There's a boat dat's leavin' soon for New York"). She regains her strength and rushes inside, slamming the door on his face, but he leaves a packet of happy dust on her doorstep, and settles down to wait.

Scene 3: Catfish Row, a week later

On a beautiful morning, Porgy is released from jail, where he has been arrested for contempt of court after refusing to look at Crown's body. He returns to Catfish Row much richer after playing craps with his cellmates. He gives gifts to the residents, and pulls out a beautiful red dress for Bess. He does not understand why everyone seems so uneasy at his return. He sees Clara's baby is now with Serena and realizes something is wrong. He asks where Bess is. Maria and Serena tell him that Bess has run off with Sportin' Life to New York ("Oh Bess, Oh Where's my Bess?"). Porgy calls for his goat cart, and resolves to leave Catfish Row to find her. He prays for strength, and begins his journey. ("Oh, Lawd, I'm on my way")

== Racial controversy ==
The Gershwins stipulated that only Black people be allowed to play the lead roles when the opera was performed in the United States, launching the careers of several prominent opera singers. George Gershwin sought to write a true jazz opera and believed that Metropolitan Opera staff singers could never master the jazz idiom, which could instead only be sung by a Black cast. Some Black singers were overjoyed at George's work; a cast member called him the "Abraham Lincoln of Negro music".

Nevertheless, the opera's depiction of African Americans attracted controversy from the outset. Virgil Thomson, a white American composer, stated that "Folklore subjects recounted by an outsider are only valid as long as the folk in question is unable to speak for itself, which is certainly not true of the American Negro in 1935." An apocryphal quote attributed to Duke Ellington allegedly stated "the times are here to debunk Gershwin's lampblack Negroisms," but the quote was probably invented by a journalist who interviewed Ellington about the opera. Ellington publicly repudiated the article shortly after its publication. Ellington's response to the 1952 Breen revival was completely the opposite. His telegram to the producer read: "Your Porgy and Bess the superbest, singing the gonest, acting the craziest, Gershwin the greatest." Several of the members of the original cast later stated that they, too, had concerns that their characters might play into a stereotype that African Americans lived in poverty, took drugs, and solved their problems with their fists.

Another production of Porgy and Bess, this time at the University of Minnesota in 1939, ran into similar troubles. According to Barbara Cyrus, one of the few Black students then at the university, members of the local African-American community saw the play as "detrimental to the race" and as a vehicle that promoted racist stereotypes. The play was canceled due to pressure from the African-American community, which saw their success as proof of the increasing political power of Black people in Minneapolis–Saint Paul.

The belief that Porgy and Bess was racist gained strength during the civil rights movement and Black Power movement of the 1950s, 1960s and 1970s. As these movements advanced, Porgy and Bess was seen as more and more out of date. When the play was revived in the 1960s, social critic and African-American educator Harold Cruse called it, "The most incongruous, contradictory cultural symbol ever created in the Western World."

In the 1976 Houston Opera production, the director, Sherwin Goldman, had trouble finding interested performers. Goldman, a White Texas native and a graduate of Yale and Oxford Universities, recalled, "I was auditioning singers all around the country, I guess thirty cities in all, from theater groups to church choirs, but was having a hard time finding directors ... I don't think there was a single Black person, of those who had never been associated with Porgy, who didn't seriously bad-mouth it." Nevertheless, a cast was assembled of African American classically trained performers from all around the country.

Gershwin's all-Black opera was also unpopular with some celebrated Black artists. Harry Belafonte declined to play Porgy in the late 1950s film version, so the role went to Sidney Poitier. Poitier found the opera insulting and only took on the film role due to coercion from producer Samuel Goldwyn. Betty Allen, president of The Harlem School of the Arts, admittedly loathed the piece, and Grace Bumbry, who excelled in the 1985 Metropolitan Opera production as Bess, made the often cited statement:

I thought it beneath me, I felt I had worked far too hard, that we had come far too far to have to retrogress to 1935. My way of dealing with it was to see that it was really a piece of Americana, of American history, whether we liked it or not. Whether I sing it or not, it was still going to be there.

Over time, however, the opera gained acceptance from the opera community and some in the African-American community. Maurice Peress stated in 2004 that "Porgy and Bess belongs as much to the Black singer-actors who bring it to life as it does to the Heywards and the Gershwins."

=== Adaptations in other countries ===
During the era of apartheid in South Africa, several South African theater companies planned to put on all-white productions of Porgy and Bess. Ira Gershwin, as heir to his brother, consistently refused to permit these productions to be staged. But in 2009, Cape Town Opera's production, set in 1970s South Africa and inspired by life in Soweto, toured Britain, opening at the Wales Millennium Centre in Cardiff and going on to the Royal Festival Hall in London and Edinburgh Festival Theatre. Most of the cast were Black South Africans; American singers involved in the production have found the "passionate identification with the opera" by the South African singers "a wake-up call".

"I think we've got a little jaded in the US with Porgy and Bess", says Lisa Daltirus, one of two singers who will play Bess on the UK tour. "A lot of people just think that this is a show that is lovely to listen to and happened way back when. They're not thinking that you can still find places where this is real. And if we're not careful we could be right back there."

— The Times, London, October 16, 2009

A 2017/2018 staging of the opera by the Hungarian State Opera featured a predominantly White cast. While the opera was presented in the context of the Syrian migrant crisis (moved from Catfish Row to an airport), the controversy of recasting continued. While the Hungarian State Opera, in discussions with the Tams-Witmark Music Library originally agreed to the casting requirements, it ultimately declined to do so when the wording was not included in the written contract. This production galvanized conservative commentators who lauded it as a success over "political correctness". Ultimately, Tams-Witmark required the Hungarian State Opera to include in its printed material that this production "is contrary to the requirements for the presentation of this work". A 2026 scholarly study described the breaking of the Gerswhin Estate's requirement and the related politics on part of the director of the Opera as a case of "dirty White race sarcasm".

== Musical elements ==
In the summer of 1934, George Gershwin worked on the opera in Charleston, South Carolina. He drew inspiration from the James Island Gullah community, which he felt had preserved some African musical traditions.

The music reflects his New York jazz roots, but also draws on southern black traditions. Gershwin modeled the pieces after each type of folk song which the composer knew about; jubilees, blues, praying songs, street cries, work songs, and spirituals and blended them with arias and recitatives from European opera tradition.

The most fundamental influences on the composition and orchestrations in evidence throughout Porgy and Bess, aside from those of American jazz and black religious music, are the European composers whose music Gershwin studied and absorbed during his tutelage with the likes of Edward Kilenyi, Rubin Goldmark, Charles Hambitzer, and Henry Cowell. Cowell's key contribution, however, may have been to suggest that Gershwin study with Joseph Schillinger, whose influence, if not as important as his followers claim, is notable throughout. Some commenters have believed they heard similarities to melodies heard in Jewish liturgical music in Gershwin's opera. Gershwin biographer Edward Jablonski heard a similarity between the melody of "It Ain't Necessarily So" and the Haftarah blessing, while others hear similarities with Torah blessing. In a sociological survey of Jewish American culture, the author remarked, "One musicologist detected 'an uncanny resemblance' between the folk tune 'Havenu [sic] Shalom Aleichem' and the spiritual [sic] 'It Take a Long Pull to Get There' from Porgy and Bess."

The score makes use of a series of leitmotifs. Many of these represent individual characters: some of these are fragments of the opera's set numbers (Sportin' Life, for example, is frequently represented by the melody which sets the title words of "It Ain't Necessarily So"). Other motifs represent objects (such as the sleazy chromatic "Happy Dust" motif) or places, notably Catfish Row. Many of the through-composed passages of the score combine or develop these leitmotifs in order to reflect the on-stage action. Particularly sophisticated uses of this techniques can be seen after the aria "There's a boat dat's leaving soon for New York" in act 3, scene 2. The opera also frequently reprises its set numbers (these might be considered extended Leitsektionen). Notable in this respect are the reprises of "Bess, you is my woman now" and "I got plenty o' nuttin' " which conclude act 2, scene 1. The song "Summertime" is stated four times alone.

The duration of the work is about 180 minutes.

=== Instrumentation ===
The score calls for an orchestra consisting of the following instruments:

Woodwinds

2 flutes (second doubling piccolo)
2 oboes (second doubling English horn)
3 clarinets in B♭ (second and third doubling alto saxophones in E♭)
1 bass clarinet in B♭ (doubling fourth clarinet in B♭ and tenor saxophone in B♭)
1 bassoon

Brass

3 horns in F
3 trumpets in B♭
2 trombones
1 tuba

Percussion

timpani
xylophone
triangle
cymbals
snare drum
tom-toms
bass drum
African drums
small drum
tubular bells
wood block
temple blocks
cowbell
sandpaper
train whistle

Keyboards

1 piano

Guitars

1 banjo

Strings

violins I, II
violas
cellos
double basses

== Recordings ==
The 1976 and 1977 recordings of the opera won Grammy Awards for Best Opera Recording, making Porgy and Bess the only opera to win this award over two consecutive years.

=== Excerpts ===
Days after the Broadway premiere of Porgy and Bess with an all-black cast, two white opera singers, Lawrence Tibbett and Helen Jepson, both members of the Metropolitan Opera, recorded highlights of the opera in a New York sound studio, released as Highlights from Porgy and Bess.

Members of the original cast were not recorded until 1940, when Todd Duncan and Anne Brown recorded selections from the work. Two years later, when the first Broadway revival occurred, American Decca rushed other members of the cast into the recording studio to record other selections not recorded in 1940. These two albums were marketed as a two-volume 78 rpm set Selections from George Gershwin's Folk Opera Porgy and Bess. After LPs began to be manufactured in 1948, the recording was transferred to LP, and subsequently, to CD.

Also in 1940, baritone Bruce Foote released a 78-RPM album of selections from Porgy and Bess.

In 1942, Mabel Mercer and Cy Walter released a 78-RPM jazz album of excerpts from the opera on an obscure label.

Although members of the jazz community initially felt that a Jewish-American composer and a white novelist could not adequately convey the plight of black people in a 1930s Charleston ghetto, jazz musicians warmed up more to the opera after twenty years, and more jazz-based recordings of it began to appear. Louis Armstrong and Ella Fitzgerald recorded an album in 1957 in which they sang and scatted Gershwin's tunes. The next year, Miles Davis recorded what some consider a seminal interpretation of the opera arranged for big band.

In 1959, Columbia Masterworks Records released a soundtrack album of Samuel Goldwyn's film version of Porgy and Bess, which had been made that year. It was not a complete version of the opera, nor was it even a complete version of the film soundtrack, which featured more music than could be contained on a single LP. The album remained in print until the early 1970s, when it was withdrawn from stores at the request of the Gershwin estate. It is the first stereo album of music from Porgy and Bess with an all-black cast. However, according to the album liner notes, Sammy Davis Jr. was under contract to another recording company, and his vocal tracks for the film could not be used on the album. Cab Calloway substituted his own vocals of Sportin' Life's songs. Robert McFerrin was the singing voice of Porgy, and Adele Addison the singing voice of Bess. The white singer Loulie Jean Norman was the singing voice of Clara (portrayed onscreen by Diahann Carroll), and Inez Matthews the singing voice of Serena (portrayed onscreen by Ruth Attaway).

In 1963, Leontyne Price and William Warfield, who had starred in the 1952 world tour of Porgy and Bess, recorded their own album of excerpts from the opera for RCA Victor. None of the other singers from that production appeared on that album, but John W. Bubbles, the original Sportin' Life, substituted for Cab Calloway (who had played Sportin' Life onstage in the 1952 production). The 1963 recording of Porgy and Bess excerpts remains the only official recording of the score on which Bubbles sings Sportin' Life's two big numbers.

In, 1976, for RCA Victor, Ray Charles and Cleo Laine recorded an album of excerpts in which the two of them sang several roles. The album was arranged and conducted by Frank De Vol. It featured the organ of Joe Sample, the trumpet of Harry Edison and guitar work of Joe Pass and Lee Ritenour. It was jazz-based with full orchestrations, but the orchestrations used were not Gershwin's.

In 1990, Leonard Slatkin conducted an album of excerpts from the opera, released on a Philips Records CD, with Simon Estes (who sang Porgy in the first Metropolitan Opera production of the work) and Roberta Alexander.

=== Complete recordings ===
- 1951: Columbia Masterworks: the company recorded a 3-LP album of what was then the standard performing version of Porgy and Bess—the most complete recording made of the opera up to that time. It was billed as a "complete" version, but was complete only insofar as that was the way the work was usually performed then. (Actually, nearly an hour was cut from the opera.) Because album producer Goddard Lieberson was eager to bring as much of Porgy and Bess as he felt was practical on records at the time, the recording featured more of Gershwin's original recitatives and orchestrations than had ever been heard before. The recording was conducted by Lehman Engel, and starred Lawrence Winters and Camilla Williams, both from the New York City Opera. Several singers who had been associated with the original 1935 production and the 1942 revival of Porgy and Bess were finally given a chance to record their roles more or less complete. The album was highly acclaimed as a giant step in recorded opera in its time. It was re-released at budget price on the Odyssey label in the early 1970s. It has subsequently appeared on CD on Sony's "Masterworks Heritage" CD series, and on the Naxos label as well. The album is not sung in as directly "operatic" a style as later versions, treading a fine line between opera and musical theater.
- 1952: Guild (not released until 2008): A live recording of a September 21, 1952, performance of Porgy and Bess, starring Leontyne Price, William Warfield, Cab Calloway and the rest of the cast of the 1952 Davis-Breen revival. This is the only known recording of an actual performance made from the historic and highly acclaimed 1952 world tour of the opera. While the opera itself is not performed truly complete, it is a complete recording of that specific performance. Alexander Smallens, who led the original 1935 production and the 1942 revival, conducts. Some of the sung recitatives are still performed as spoken dialogue in the production.
- 1956: Bethlehem Records: A version of the opera more heavily oriented toward jazz than the original. Mel Tormé sings Porgy and Frances Faye is Bess. The only 3-LP version of most of the opera with white singers. (Released on CD by Rhino Records.)
- 1976: Decca Records: The first complete recording of the opera based on Gershwin's original score, restoring the material cut by Gershwin during rehearsals for the New York premiere in 1935, was made by the Cleveland Orchestra under Lorin Maazel in 1976 for Decca Records in the UK and London Records in the U.S., in time for the U.S. Bicentennial. It starred Willard White singing his first Porgy, and Leona Mitchell as Bess.
- 1977: RCA Victor: A complete recording of the opera by the Houston Grand Opera based on the complete original score.
- 1989: EMI: The Glyndebourne album also based on the complete original score, without Gershwin's cuts.
- 2006: Decca: A recording of the opera made by the Nashville Symphony under John Mauceri is the first to observe Gershwin's cuts and thus present the opera as it was heard in New York in 1935. The musical cuts made on this album coincide almost exactly with those in the 1951 album, with the exception that "The Buzzard Song", usually cut in early productions, is heard on the 1951 album, and the "Occupational Humoresque", heard on the 2006 album, is not heard on the 1951 album at all. This version stars Marquita Lister as Bess.
- 2010: RCA Victor: Nikolaus Harnoncourt, an unusual choice for this Gershwin opera, conducted a recording of an almost complete Porgy and Bess, which was released in the U.S. in September 2010. Gregg Baker, who sang Crown in the 1985 Metropolitan Opera production, the 1986 Glyndebourne production, the 1989 EMI recording made with the Glyndebourne cast, and in the 1993 television adaptation of that production, repeated his performance here, but the roles of Porgy and Bess are taken by two singers virtually unknown in the U.S., Jonathan Lemalu and Isabelle Kabatu.
- 2014: EuroArts Music International: DVD and Blu-ray recorded live by San Francisco Opera in June 2009, with Eric Owens and Laquita Mitchell in the title roles.

== Adaptations ==
=== Film ===
==== 1959 film ====
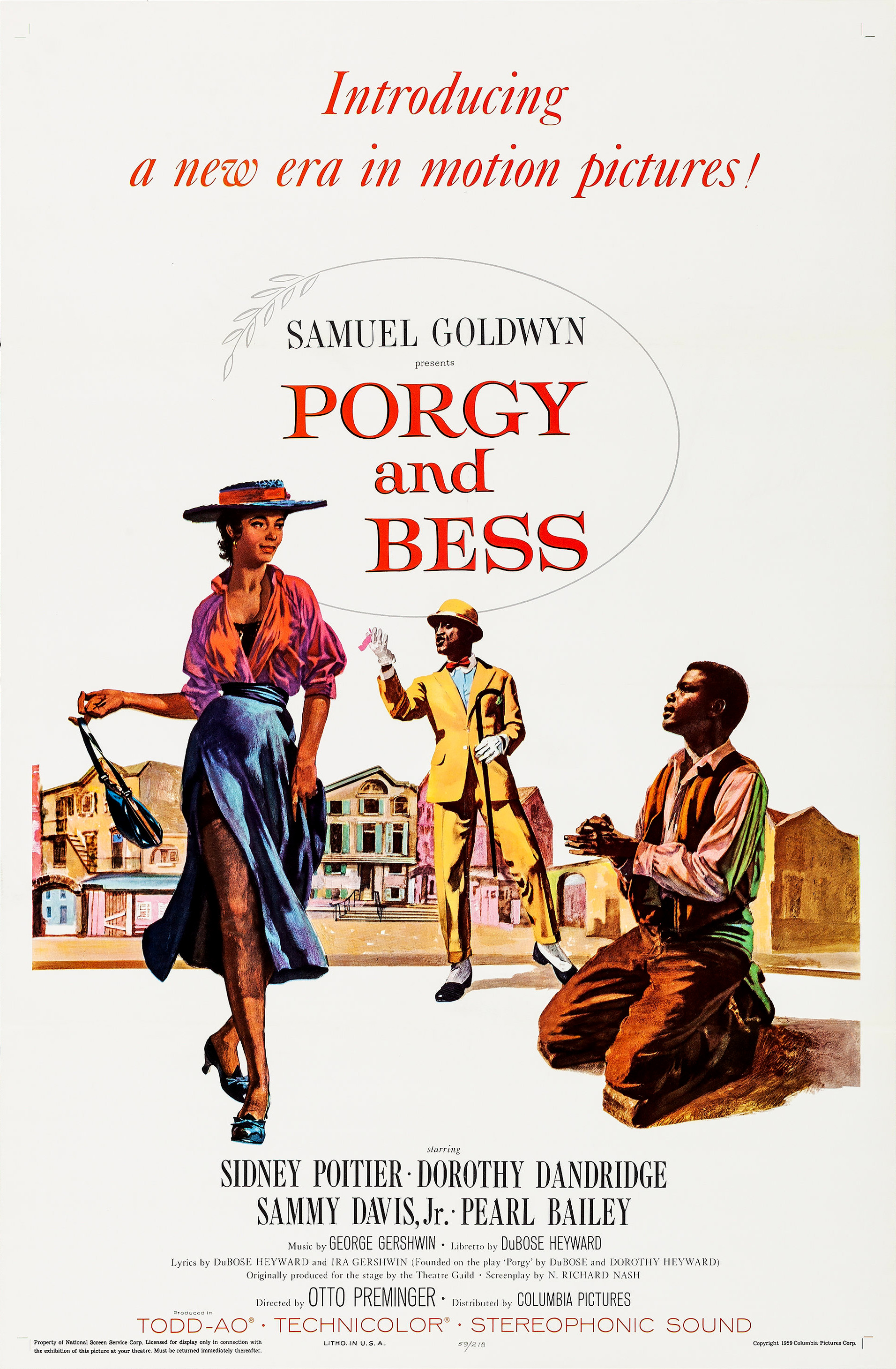
Poster for the 1959 film version

A 1959 film adaptation, produced in 70 mm Todd-AO by Samuel Goldwyn, was plagued with problems. Rouben Mamoulian, who helmed the 1935 Broadway premiere, was hired to direct, but was subsequently fired in favor of director Otto Preminger, following a disagreement with the producer. Mamoulian urged making the film on location in South Carolina after a soundstage fire destroyed the sets. Goldwyn, who wasn't a fan of on location production, considered Mamoulian's request a sign of disloyalty.

Robert McFerrin dubs the singing voice for Sidney Poitier and Adele Addison for Dorothy Dandridge, with Ruth Attaway and Diahann Carroll also dubbed. Although Dandridge and Carroll were singers, their voices were not considered operatic enough. Sammy Davis Jr. (Sportin' Life), Brock Peters (Crown), and Pearl Bailey (Maria) were the only principals who provide their own singing. André Previn's adaptation of the score won him an Academy Award, the film's only Oscar. An associated soundtrack recording was released on LP by Columbia Masterworks Records. For the soundtrack album, Cab Calloway performed the songs sung by the Sportin' Life character because Davis's label, Decca records, released a competing album featuring Davis and Carmen McRae performing songs from the opera.

The Gershwin estate was disappointed with the film, as the score was substantially edited to make it more like a musical. Much of the music was ultimately omitted from the film, and many of Gershwin's orchestrations were either changed or completely scrapped. It was shown on network television in the U.S. only once, in 1967. Critics lambasted it for not being faithful to the opera, for over-refining the language grammatically, and for its "overblown" staging. The film was removed from release in 1974 by the Gershwin estate. In 2011, it was selected to the U.S. National Film Registry.

Mike Medavoy and Bobby Geisler announced in 2019 that they are developing a re-envisioned and updated film version with the approval of the Gershwin estate. It is to be directed by Dee Rees.

==== Other films ====
Rhapsody in Blue (1945), the Warner Bros. biopic of Gershwin, features an extended musical scene recreating the opening of the original Broadway production of Porgy and Bess. Included was the original Bess, Anne Brown, recreating her performance. The scene includes a more elaborate (and historically inaccurate) arrangement of "Summertime", sung by Brown with a full chorus. However, the Catfish Row set design is a virtual duplicate of the one seen in the 1935 Broadway stage production.

White Nights (1985) features Gregory Hines performing "There's a Boat Dat's Leavin' Soon for New York" as Sportin' Life, with Russian spoken words. Hines' rendition, before a Siberian audience, included a tap dance. Director Taylor Hackford pointed out in a special edition DVD release that it was necessary to locate a Russian woman of color (Helene Denbey) to portray Bess, as per Gershwin's stipulations.

=== Television ===
In 1993, Trevor Nunn's Glyndebourne Festival stage production of Porgy and Bess, not to be confused with his later production, was greatly expanded scenically and videotaped in a television studio without an audience. This first Nunn production was also called The Gershwins' 'Porgy and Bess' when shown on television. It was telecast by the BBC in England and by PBS in the United States. It featured a cast of operatic American singers, with the exception of Willard White, who is Jamaican but sounded American, as Porgy. Cynthia Haymon sang the role of Bess. Nunn's "opening up" of the stage production was considered highly imaginative; his cast received much critical praise, and the three-hour production retained nearly all of Gershwin's music, heard in the original 1935 orchestrations. This included the opera's sung recitatives, which have occasionally been turned into spoken dialogue in other productions. No extra dialogue was written for this production, as had been done in the 1959 film. All performers lip-synched rather than singing live on set, leading The New York Times to write: "What you hear is basically Mr. Nunn's acclaimed Glyndebourne Festival production, the original cast intact. What you see was filmed later in a London studio. The performers, some new to the production, are lip-synching. It's as if an elaborate visual aid had been concocted for the EMI recording."

This Porgy and Bess production was subsequently released on VHS and DVD. It has won far greater acclaim than the 1959 film, which was widely panned by most critics. The 1993 television production of Porgy and Bess was nominated for four Emmy Awards, and won for its art direction. It also won a BAFTA Award for Best Video Lighting.

In 2002, the New York City Opera telecast its new version of the Houston Opera production, in a live performance from the stage of Lincoln Center. This version featured far more cuts than the previous telecast, but, like nearly all stage versions produced since 1976, used the sung recitatives and Gershwin's orchestrations. The telecast also included interviews with director Tazewell Thompson and was hosted by Beverly Sills.

In 2009 the San Francisco Opera debuted the Gershwins' Porgy and Bess to critical acclaim. The production was recorded at that time and shown on PBS in the fall of 2014, and was later released on DVD and Blu-ray.

=== Radio ===
On December 1, 1935, during the Broadway run, Todd Duncan and Anne Brown performed "Summertime", "I Got Plenty o' Nuttin'" and "Bess, You Is My Woman Now" on NBC's The Magic Key of RCA radio program. Duncan and Brown also appeared on the 1937 CBS Gershwin memorial concert on September 8, 1937, broadcast from the Hollywood Bowl less than two months after the composer's death, along with several other members of the Broadway cast, including John W. Bubbles and Ruby Elzy. They performed several selections from the opera.

The complete Porgy and Bess has been broadcast by the Metropolitan Opera three times as part of the Met's live radio broadcast series. The 1985 broadcast performance starred Simon Estes and Roberta Alexander. In 1986 Bumbry was heard with Robert Mosley as Porgy. In 1990, Estes and Leona Mitchell sang the leads in the third broadcast.

=== Concert ===
Gershwin prepared an orchestral suite containing music from the opera after Porgy and Bess closed early on Broadway. Though it was originally titled "Suite from Porgy and Bess", Ira later renamed it Catfish Row.

In 1942 Robert Russell Bennett arranged a medley (rather than a suite) for orchestra which has often been heard in the concert hall, known as Porgy and Bess: A Symphonic Picture. It is based on Gershwin's original scoring, though for a slightly different instrumentation (the piano was removed from the orchestral texture at the request of the conductor Fritz Reiner, for whom the arrangement was made). In addition, both Morton Gould and Robert Farnon each arranged an orchestral suite, premiering in 1956 and 1966, respectively.

=== Pop music versions ===
- 1959 – Sammy Davis Jr. and Carmen McRae – Porgy and Bess (Decca, 1959). Davis appeared and sang in the 1959 Porgy and Bess film, though his vocal performances were not released on the film's Columbia Records soundtrack LP.
- 1959 – Harry Belafonte and Lena Horne – Porgy and Bess (RCA Victor). Featuring big band orchestral settings.
- 1976 – Ray Charles and Cleo Laine – Porgy & Bess (RCA Victor). Featuring an orchestra led by Frank De Vol.

=== Jazz versions ===
- 1956 – Various Artists – The Complete Porgy and Bess (Bethlehem Records). Features Duke Ellington and his orchestra, Mel Tormé, Johnny Hartman, Frank Rosolino, and Sonny Clark. Recorded in May 1956.
- 1957 – Buddy Collette – Porgy & Bess (Interlude, released 1959). Performed by a sextet featuring Pete Jolly (playing accordion), Gerald Wiggins (playing organ), Jim Hall, Red Callender, and Louis Bellson. Recorded in July 1957.
- 1957 – Ella Fitzgerald and Louis Armstrong – Porgy and Bess (Verve, released 1958). Featuring an orchestra arranged and conducted by Russell Garcia. Recorded in August and October 1957.
- 1958 – Miles Davis – Porgy and Bess (Columbia Records, released 1959). Features a jazz orchestra arranged and conducted by Gil Evans. Recorded in July/August 1958.
- 1958 – Mundell Lowe – Porgy & Bess (RCA Camden, released in 1959). Most tracks featuring a septet, with Art Farmer, Ben Webster, Don Elliott and others. Recorded in July and October 1958.
- 1958 – Rex Stewart and Cootie Williams – Porgy & Bess Revisited (Warner Bros., released 1959). A big-band performance that features Stewart and Williams (who appear separately), arranged and conducted by Jim Timmens. Recorded in late 1958.
- 1958 – Hank Jones – Porgy and Bess (Capitol, released 1959). Featuring a jazz quartet including Kenny Burrell, Milt Hinton, and Elvin Jones. Recorded late 1958.
- 1959 – Bill Potts – The Jazz Soul of Porgy and Bess (United Artists, released 1959). A big band performance arranged and conducted by Potts, featuring Harry 'Sweets' Edison, Art Farmer, Charlie Shavers, Phil Woods, Zoot Sims, Al Cohn, Jimmy Cleveland, Bill Evans, and others. Recorded in January 1959.
- 1959 – Oscar Peterson – Oscar Peterson Plays Porgy & Bess (Verve, released 1959). Performed by Peterson's trio with Ray Brown and Ed Thigpen. Recorded in October 1959.
- 1965 – Modern Jazz Quartet – The Modern Jazz Quartet Plays George Gershwin's Porgy and Bess (Atlantic, 1965). Recorded in 1964 and 1965.
- 1971 – Eddy Louiss and Ivan Jullien – Porgy and Bess (Riviera, 1971). A big band performance of material from the opera with Louiss on Hammond organ and André Ceccarelli on drums.
- 1976 – Oscar Peterson and Joe Pass – Porgy and Bess (Pablo Records, released 1976). Duet recordings with Peterson playing clavichord.
- 1997 – Joe Henderson – Porgy & Bess (Verve). A collection of small-group performances featuring Tommy Flanagan, Dave Holland, Jack DeJohnette, and guest soloists including John Scofield and Conrad Herwig.
- 2016 – Toshiko Akiyoshi – Toskhiko Akiyoshi plays Gerswhin's "Porgy and Bess (Studio Songs, released 2016). Recorded in 2015.

=== Piano ===
In 1951, Australian-born composer Percy Grainger, who was an admirer, performer and arranger of Gershwin's music, completed a twenty-minute piece for two pianos titled Fantasy on George Gershwin's Porgy and Bess.

The pianist Earl Wild prepared a virtuoso piano arrangement in the manner of Franz Liszt, entitled Grand Fantasy on Airs from Porgy and Bess.

=== Brass quintet version ===
- In 1987 the Canadian Brass commissioned Luther Henderson to create an arrangement of Porgy and Bess music for an RCA Red Seal recording release "Strike Up The Band". The printed version then became available to performers from Hal Leonard Publishing Corp.

=== Rock version ===
- In 1991, experimental rock band When People Were Shorter and Lived Near the Water released the album Porgy, consisting entirely of their interpretations of songs from Porgy and Bess, on Shimmy Disc. It was originally planned for release in 1990, but was held up by legal objections from the Gershwin estate.

== Songs ==
Porgy and Bess contains many songs that have become popular in their own right, becoming standards in jazz and blues in addition to their original operatic setting.

Some of the most popular songs are:

- "Summertime", act 1, scene 1 – Clara and Jake
- "A Woman Is a Sometime Thing", act 1, scene 1
- "My Man's Gone Now", act 1, scene 2
- "It Take a Long Pull to Get There", act 2, scene 1
- "I Got Plenty o' Nuttin'", act 2, scene 1
- "Buzzard Keep on Flyin'", act 2, scene 1
- "Bess, You Is My Woman Now", act 2, scene 1
- "Oh, I Can't Sit Down," act 2, scene 1
- "It Ain't Necessarily So", act 2, scene 2
- "What You Want Wid Bess", act 2, scene 2
- "Oh, Doctor Jesus", act 2, scene 3
- "I Wants to Stay Here", act 2, scene 3 – Bess
- "I Loves You, Porgy", act 2, scene 3 – Bess, Porgy
- "A Red-Haired Woman", act 2, scene 4
- "There's a Boat Dat's Leavin' Soon for New York", act 3, scene 2
- "Bess, O Where's My Bess?", act 3, scene 3
- "O Lawd, I'm on My Way", act 3, scene 3

Some of the more celebrated renditions of these songs include Sarah Vaughan's "It Ain't Necessarily So" and the versions of "Summertime" recorded by Billie Holiday, Ella Fitzgerald and Louis Armstrong, Miles Davis, John Coltrane, and Jascha Heifetz in his own transcriptions for violin and piano.

Numerous other musicians have recorded "Summertime" in varying styles, including both instrumental and vocal recordings; it may even be the most popular cover song in popular music.

- Janis Joplin recorded a Blues rock version of "Summertime" with Big Brother and the Holding Company. Billy Stewart's version became a Top 10 Pop and R&B hit in 1966 for Chess Records.
- Even seemingly unlikely performers such as The Zombies (1965) or the ska punk band Sublime (as "Doin' Time", 1997) have made recordings of "Summertime". An international group of collectors of recordings of "Summertime" by the name "The Summertime Connection" claims more than 30,000 recorded performances (many live) in their collection.
- Nina Simone recorded several Porgy and Bess songs. She made her debut in 1959 with a version of "I Loves You, Porgy", which became a Billboard top 20 hit. Other songs she recorded included "Porgy, I's Your Woman Now" [i.e. "Bess, You Is My Woman Now"], "Summertime" and "My Man's Gone Now".
- Phoebe Snow recorded a small jazz combo version of "There's a Boat Dat's Leavin' Soon for New York" on her "Second Childhood" album in 1976.
- Christina Aguilera performed "I Loves You, Porgy" in a tribute to the Nina Simone version at the 2008 Grammy Nominations Concert.
- The violinist Isaac Stern and the cellist Julian Lloyd Webber both recorded instrumental versions of "Bess, You is My Woman Now".
- The Marcels, a racially diverse doo-wop group, recorded a version of "Summertime" as a follow-up to their hit cover of "Blue Moon" in 1961. It was unusual in that it was recorded in a major key rather than Gershwin's minor key.

== Commendations ==
On July 14, 1993, the United States Postal Service recognized the opera's cultural significance by issuing a commemorative 29-cent postage stamp.

In 2001, Porgy and Bess was proclaimed the official opera of the state of South Carolina.

The 1940/1942 Decca Porgy and Bess recording with members of the original cast was included by the National Recording Preservation Board in the Library of Congress, National Recording Registry in 2003. The board selects recordings on an annual basis that are "culturally, historically, or aesthetically significant."

== Awards and nominations ==
=== 1953 Broadway revival ===
Year	Award	Category	Nominee	Result
1956	Tony Award	Best Stage Technician	Larry Bland	Nominated

=== 1976 Broadway revival ===
Year	Award	Category	Nominee	Result
1977	Tony Award	Best Revival		Nominated
1977	Tony Award	Best Actress in a Musical	Clamma Dale	Nominated
1977	Tony Award	Best Featured Actor in a Musical	Larry Marshall	Nominated
1977	Tony Award	Best Direction of a Musical	Jack O'Brien	Nominated
1977	Tony Award	Best Scenic Design	Robert Randolph	Nominated
1977	Tony Award	Best Costume Design	Nancy Potts	Nominated
1977	Drama Desk Award	Outstanding Musical		Nominated
1977	Drama Desk Award	Outstanding Actress in a Musical	Clamma Dale	Won
1977	Drama Desk Award	Outstanding Actress in a Musical	Esther Hinds	Nominated
1977	Drama Desk Award	Outstanding Featured Actor in a Musical	Larry Marshall	Nominated
1977	Drama Desk Award	Outstanding Featured Actress in a Musical	Delores Ivory Davis	Nominated
1977	Drama Desk Award	Outstanding Director of a Musical	Jack O'Brien	Nominated
1977	Drama Desk Award	Outstanding Set Design	Robert Randolph	Nominated
1977	Drama Desk Award	Outstanding Costume Design	Nancy Potts	Nominated
1977	Drama Desk Award	Outstanding Lighting Design	Gilbert V. Hemsley, Jr.	Nominated

=== 1983 Broadway revival ===
Year	Award	Category	Nominee	Result
1983	Tony Award	Best Actor in a Musical	Michael V. Smartt	Nominated
1983	Tony Award	Best Choreography	George Faison	Nominated

=== 2006 West End production ===
Year	Award	Category	Nominee	Result
2007	Laurence Olivier Award	Best New Musical		Nominated
2007	Laurence Olivier Award	Best Actor in a Musical	Clarke Peters	Nominated
2007	Laurence Olivier Award	Best Actress in a Musical	Nicola Hughes	Nominated

=== 2012 Broadway revival ===
Year	Award	Category	Nominee	Result
2012	Tony Award	Best Revival of a Musical		Won
2012	Tony Award	Best Actor in a Musical	Norm Lewis	Nominated
2012	Tony Award	Best Actress in a Musical	Audra McDonald	Won
2012	Tony Award	Best Featured Actor in a Musical	Phillip Boykin	Nominated
2012	Tony Award	Best Featured Actor in a Musical	David Alan Grier	Nominated
2012	Tony Award	Best Direction of a Musical	Diane Paulus	Nominated
2012	Tony Award	Best Orchestrations	William David Brohn, Christopher Jahnke	Nominated
2012	Tony Award	Best Costume Design of a Musical	Emilio Sosa	Nominated
2012	Tony Award	Best Sound Design of a Musical	Acme Sound Partners	Nominated
2012	Drama Desk Award	Outstanding Revival of a Musical		Nominated
2012	Drama Desk Award	Outstanding Actor in a Musical	Norm Lewis	Nominated
2012	Drama Desk Award	Outstanding Actress in a Musical	Audra McDonald	Won
2012	Drama Desk Award	Outstanding Featured Actor in a Musical	Phillip Boykin	Nominated
2012	Drama Desk Award	Outstanding Sound Design of a Musical	Acme Sound Partners	Won
2012	Drama League Award	Outstanding Revival of a Musical		Nominated
2012	Drama League Award	Distinguished Performance	Audra McDonald	Won
2012	Outer Critics Circle Award	Outstanding Revival of a Musical		Nominated
2012	Outer Critics Circle Award	Outstanding Actor in a Musical	Norm Lewis	Nominated
2012	Outer Critics Circle Award	Outstanding Actress in a Musical	Audra McDonald	Won
2012	Outer Critics Circle Award	Outstanding Featured Actor in a Musical	Phillip Boykin	Nominated
2012	Theatre World Award		Phillip Boykin	Won
