= Bess, You Is My Woman Now =

Duet from Porgy and Bess

"Bess, You Is My Woman Now" is a duet with music by George Gershwin and lyrics by Ira Gershwin and DuBose Heyward. This song comes from the Gershwins' opera Porgy and Bess, where it is sung by the main character Porgy and his beloved Bess. They express their love for each other and say that they now belong together.

The song has been covered a number of times by many artists. Ella Fitzgerald and Louis Armstrong recorded it on their 1959 album Porgy and Bess. Also in 1959, Harry Belafonte recorded a duet with Lena Horne on their album Porgy and Bess. In 1954 Harry James released a version on his album Trumpet After Midnight (Columbia CL-553). Neil Sedaka sang a cover of this song for his 1961 album Circulate. Barbra Streisand recorded this song on her The Broadway Album from 1985, named "I Loves You, Porgy/Porgy, I's Your Woman Now (Bess, You Is My Woman Now)".

Critic Carlton Jones called the song "the most beautiful duet in American folk music." Geoffrey Block notes that the song's dramatic point is that "Bess's love can eliminate Porgy's loneliness", and that it is featured in "the only scene in which Porgy and Bess express their love with uninhibited optimism for their future together."
