= John Bernecker =

American stunt performer (1984–2017)

- Born: John Hagen Bernecker; March 2, 1984; New Orleans, Louisiana, U.S.
- Died: July 13, 2017 (aged 33); Atlanta, Georgia, U.S.
- Cause of death: Head trauma
- Resting place: Metairie Cemetery, New Orleans, Louisiana, U.S.
- Years active: 2009–2017
- Television: The Walking Dead

John Hagen Bernecker (March 2, 1984 – July 13, 2017) was an American stunt performer.

== Early life ==
Bernecker was born on March 2, 1984, in New Orleans, Louisiana. He attended the University of New Orleans and Southeastern Louisiana University.

== Career ==
Bernecker worked on over 90 films and television series, including Jonah Hex, Green Lantern, The Hunger Games film series, Logan and The Fate of the Furious. He posthumously appeared in numerous films, such as Black Panther and Game Night.

== Death ==
On July 12, 2017, Bernecker was performing stunts on the television series The Walking Dead. During rehearsal of a stunt, Bernecker fell 20 feet (6.1 m) onto a concrete floor, missing a placed safety cushion by "inches", and sustained a severe head injury. This shut down production on the series. He was taken to Atlanta Medical Center and placed on life support. He died from his injuries the following day. His death was the first of two in two months of a stunt performer in North America, followed by the August death of stuntwoman Joi Harris while filming Deadpool 2.

=== Tributes ===
Tributes were paid by people Bernecker worked with, including Walking Dead stars Norman Reedus, Jeffrey Dean Morgan and Lauren Cohan. The premiere episode of the eighth season, "Mercy", the first to air after the accident, was dedicated "In Memory of John Bernecker", along with dedication to George A. Romero who died three days later.

The movie Game Night has a dedication to his memory at the end of the credits. A dedication was also made in his memory in the credits for the series finale of Turn: Washington's Spies. The movie Avengers Of Justice: Farce Wars has a tribute at the end of all the credits.

Bernecker was buried at Metairie Cemetery in New Orleans.

=== Lawsuit ===
Bernecker's parents Susan Bernecker and Hagen Bernecker initiated a lawsuit against AMC and the production companies involved in filming The Walking Dead in January 2018, asserting the companies were negligent in safety precautions for the stunt. The jury trial was held in December 2019, with the jury awarding Bernecker's family US$8.6 million in damages after finding that TWD 8, AMC's production company, and Stalwart Films were negligent in Bernecker's death, while clearing AMC of any wrongdoing. This verdict was later repealed by the Georgia Court of Appeals.
