= Stunt performer =

Person who performs stunts

Stuntman
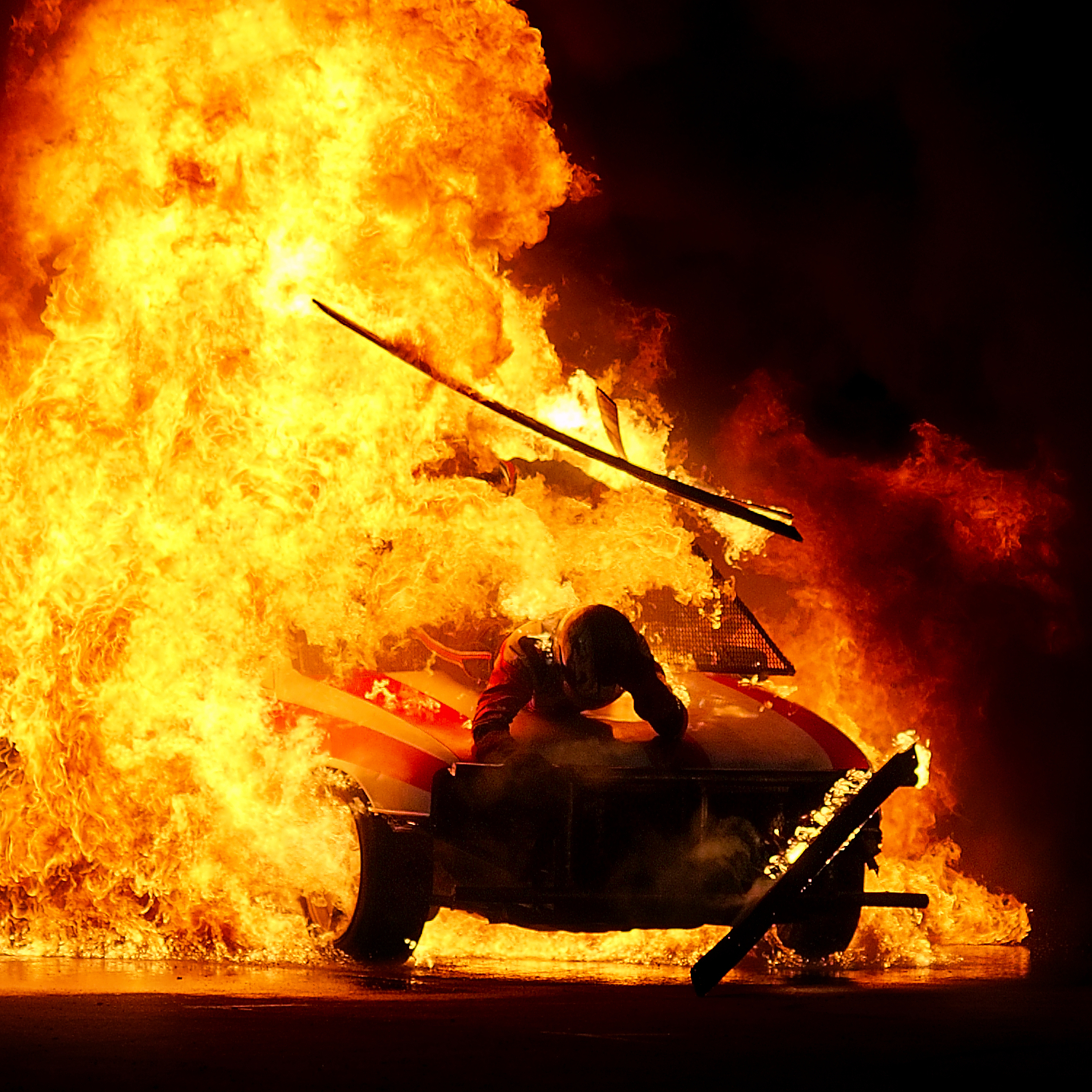
- Pyrotechnics stunt exhibition by "Giant Auto Rodéo" in Ciney, Belgium

Occupation
- Names: Stunt performer, stuntman, daredevil
- Activity sectors: Entertainment

Description
- Competencies: Physical fitness, daring, acting skills
- Fields of employment: Film, television, theatre
- Related jobs: Stunt double, stunt coordinator, actor, movie star, extra

A stunt performer, often called a stuntman or stuntwoman and occasionally stuntperson or stunt-person, is a trained professional who performs daring acts, often as a career. Stunt performers usually appear in films or on television, as opposed to a daredevil, who performs for a live audience. When they take the place of another actor, they are known as stunt doubles.

== Overview ==
A stunt performer is an actor skilled in both choreographing and safely presenting actions on-screen that appear to be dangerous, risky, or even deadly. Stunts frequently performed include car crashes, falls from great height, drags (for example, behind a horse), and the consequences of explosions.

There is an inherent risk in the performance of all stunt work. There is maximum risk when the stunts are performed in front of a live audience. In filmed performances, visible safety mechanisms can be removed by editing. In live performances the audience can see more clearly if the performer is genuinely doing what they claim or appear to do. To reduce the risk of injury or death, most often stunts are choreographed or mechanically rigged so that, while they look dangerous, safety mechanisms are built into the performance. Despite their well-choreographed appearance, stunts are still very dangerous and physically testing exercises.

From its inception as a professional skill in the early 1900s to the 1960s, stunts were most often performed by professionals who had trained in that discipline prior to entering the movie industry. Current film and television stunt performers must be trained in a variety of disciplines, including martial arts and stage combat, and must be a certified trained member of a professional stunt performers organisation first in order to obtain the necessary insurance to perform on the stage or screen. This allows them to better break down and plan an action sequence, physically prepare themselves, and incorporate both the safety and risk factors in their performances. However, even when executed perfectly, there is still strain and performing stunts often results in unplanned injury to the body.

Daredevils are distinct from stunt performers and stunt doubles; their performance is of the stunt itself, without the context of a film or television show. Daredevils often perform for an audience. Live stunt performers include escape artists, sword swallowers, glass walkers, fire eaters, trapeze artists, and many other sideshow and circus arts. They also include motorcycle display teams and the once popular Wall of Death. The Jackass films and television series are well-known and prominent recorded examples of the act in modern cinematography.

Some people act as both stunt performers and daredevils at various parts of their careers. Examples include Buster Keaton and Harry Houdini; Hong Kong action film stars Jackie Chan, Sammo Hung, Yuen Biao, Michelle Yeoh and Moon Lee; Indian film actors Jayan, Akshay Kumar, Tiger Shroff and Pawan Kalyan; Thai actor Tony Jaa; and Indonesian film actor Iko Uwais.

== History ==
=== Cascadeur ===
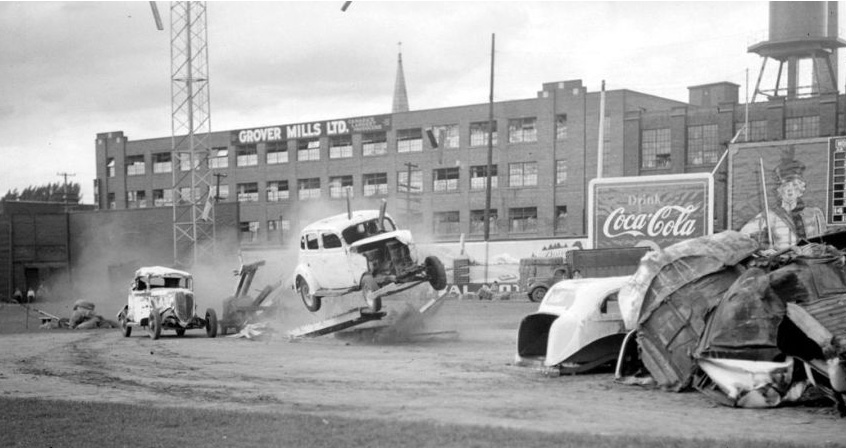
Circus performers doing an automobile stunt in Delorimier Stadium, Montreal, Canada, in 1946

The earliest stunt performers were travelling entertainers and circus performers, particularly trained gymnasts and acrobats. The origin of the original name—the French word cascadeur—derives from cascade, which is an archaic French term for "fall" (from French cascade, from Italian cascata, from cascare, "to fall").

Later, in German and Dutch circus usage, the word Kaskadeur referred to performing a sequential series of daring leaps and jumps without injury to the performer. This acrobatic discipline required long training in the ring and perfect body control to present a sensational performance to the public.

Stunt was adopted in 19th-century, vaudeville Wild West shows in North America and Europe: the prototype was Buffalo Bill's Wild West (1883—1913). The shows, which simulated battles with gun fire and arrows, romanticized the American Old West.

=== Stage combat ===
During the late 19th and early 20th centuries, swordplay stage combat scenes in touring theatrical productions throughout Europe, the Commonwealth of Nations, and North America were typically created by combining several widely known, generic routines known as "standard combats". During the late 19th and early 20th centuries, fencing masters in Europe began to research and experiment with historical fencing techniques, with weapons such as the two-handed sword, rapier, and smallsword, and to instruct actors in their use.

Notable among these revivalist instructors was George Dubois, a fight director and martial artist from Paris, who created performance fencing styles based on gladiatorial combat as well as Renaissance rapier and dagger fencing. Egerton Castle and Captain Alfred Hutton were part of a wider Victorian era group based in London, involved in reviving historical fencing systems. Circa 1899–1902, Hutton taught stage fencing classes for actors via the Bartitsu Club, where he also served on the Board of Directors and learned the basics of jujutsu and the Vigny method of stick fighting from his fellow instructors.

=== Early cinema ===
Buster Keaton, who did his own stunt work, in a potentially life-threatening scene from his 1928 film Steamboat Bill, Jr.

By the early 1900s, the motion picture industry was starting to fire-up on both sides of the Atlantic Ocean, but had no need for professional stunt performers. First, motion pictures were so new that even if the producer had a budget for performers, there were more than enough applicants willing to do the scene for free. For instance, if you needed a shot of someone on a steel beam 1,000 feet (300 m) up on a New York skyscraper, then there was always some willing to do the scene for real, and often for free. Second, the Spanish–American War had just ended, and there were many young men who were physically fit and trained in the handling of firearms looking for some work. Thirdly, the former wild west was now not only tamed, but also starting to be fenced in, greatly reducing the need for and pay of the former cowboys.

The first picture which used a dedicated stunt performer is highly debated, but occurred somewhere between 1903 and 1910. The first possible appearance of a stunt-double was Frank Hanaway in The Great Train Robbery, shot in 1903 in Milltown, New Jersey. The first auditable paid stunt was in the 1908 film The Count of Monte Cristo, with $5 paid by the director to the acrobat who had to jump upside down from a cliff into the sea.

Professional daredevil, Rodman Law, was a trick parachutist known to thousands for climbing the side of buildings and parachuting out aeroplanes and off tall base objects like the Statue of Liberty. Some of his stunts were filmed by newsreel cameras and media still photographers. Law was brought into movies in 1912 to perform some of his stunts as the hero.

As the industry developed in the West Coast around Hollywood, California, the first accepted professional stuntmen were clowns and comedians like Charlie Chaplin, Buster Keaton and the Keystone Cops. The reason for this was that staple diet of the early films was an almost continual roll call of pratfalls, high dives and comedy car wrecks – the basic ingredients of a circus clown's routine. But much like their circus-based predecessors, these actors/stuntmen were not specifically trained to perform stunts, but instead learned through trial and error.

=== Cowboy professionals ===
From 1910 onwards, American audiences developed a taste for action films, which were replicated into successful serials. These mostly western-themed scripts required a lot of extras, such as for a galloping cavalry, a band of Indians or a fast-riding sheriff's posse; all of whom needed to proficiently ride, shoot and look right on camera.

Producers also kept pushing the directors calling for riskier stunts using a recurring cast, necessitating the use of dedicated stunt doubles for most movie stars. The directors turned to the current rodeo stars for inspiration for their action scenes, and employed former cowboys as extras who not only brought with themselves the right look and style, but also rodeo techniques that included safe and replicable horse falls.

Early recruits included Tom Mix, who after winning the 1909 National Riding and Rodeo Championship, worked for the Selig Polyscope Company in Edendale. Mix made his first appearance in The Cowboy Millionaire in October 1909, and then as himself in the short documentary film titled Ranch Life in the Great Southwest in which he displayed his skills as a cattle wrangler. Mix eventually performed in over 160 cowboy matinee movies during the 1920s, and is considered by many as the first matinee cowboy idol.

The recruitment venture was aided in 1911 by the collapse of the Miller-Arlington rodeo show, which left many rodeo performers stranded in Venice, California. One of them was the young Rose August Wenger, who married and was later billed as Helen Gibson, recognised as the first American professional stunt woman. Thomas H. Ince, who was producing for the New York Motion Picture Company, hired the entire show's cast for the winter at $2,500 a week. The performers were paid $8 a week and boarded in Venice, where the horses were stabled. They then rode the 5 miles (8.0 km) each day to work in Topanga Canyon, where the films were being shot. In 1912, Helen made $15 a week for her first billed role as Ruth Roland's sister in Ranch Girls on a Rampage. After marrying Edmund Richard "Hoot" Gibson in June 1913, the couple continued working rodeos in the summer and as stunt doubles in the winter in California, most often for Kalem Studios in Glendale, California. In April 1915 while on the Kalem payroll doubling for Helen Holmes in The Hazards of Helen adventure film series, Helen performed what is thought to be her most dangerous stunt: a leap from the roof of a station onto the top of a moving train in the A Girl's Grit episode. The distance between station roof and train top was accurately measured, and she practiced the jump with the train standing still. In the actual shoot, with the train's accelerating velocity timed to the second, she leapt without hesitation and landed correctly, but with forward motion she rolled forward, saving herself from injury and improving the shot by catching hold of an air vent and dangling over the edge. She suffered only a few bruises.

Eventually, the out of work cowboys and out of season rodeo riders, and the directors/producers, figured out a system for the supply of extras. A speakeasy called The Watering Hole was located close to a Los Angeles located corral called the Sunset Corral. Every morning, the cowboys would congregate at The Watering Hole, where the directors would send over their assistants to hire for the following day. The cowboys would then dress in their normal riding clothes (unless told otherwise, for which they were paid extra), and ride to the set, most of which were located to the north in the vicinity of the San Fernando Valley. These "riding extras" jobs paid $10 per day plus a box lunch, and most were only hired on a per day basis. These early cowboy actors eventually gained the nickname The Gower Gulch Gang, as many of the small studios cranking out westerns were located on Gower Avenue.

Subsequently, a number of rodeo stars entered the movie industry on a full-time basis, with many "riding extras" eventually becoming movie stars themselves, including: Hank Bell (300 films, between 1920 and 1952); Bill Gillis; Buck Jones; Jack Montgomery (initially worked as Tom Mix's body-double); and Jack Padjeon (first appeared in 1923, played Wild Bill Hickok in the John Ford directed The Iron Horse in 1924). But the best known stuntman turned star was probably Yakima Canutt, who with his apprentices – who included John Wayne – devised during the 1930s new safety devices, including: the 'L' stirrup which allowed a rider to fall off a horse without getting hung in the stirrup; and cabling equipment to cause spectacular wagon crashes, while releasing the team. A focus on replicable and safe stunts saved producers money and prevented lost down-time for directors through reduced accidents and injury to performers. Stuntmen were now an integral part of a film's drawing power, helping to fill cinemas with thrill seeking patrons anxious to see the new Saturday matinee.

=== Safety Last! ===
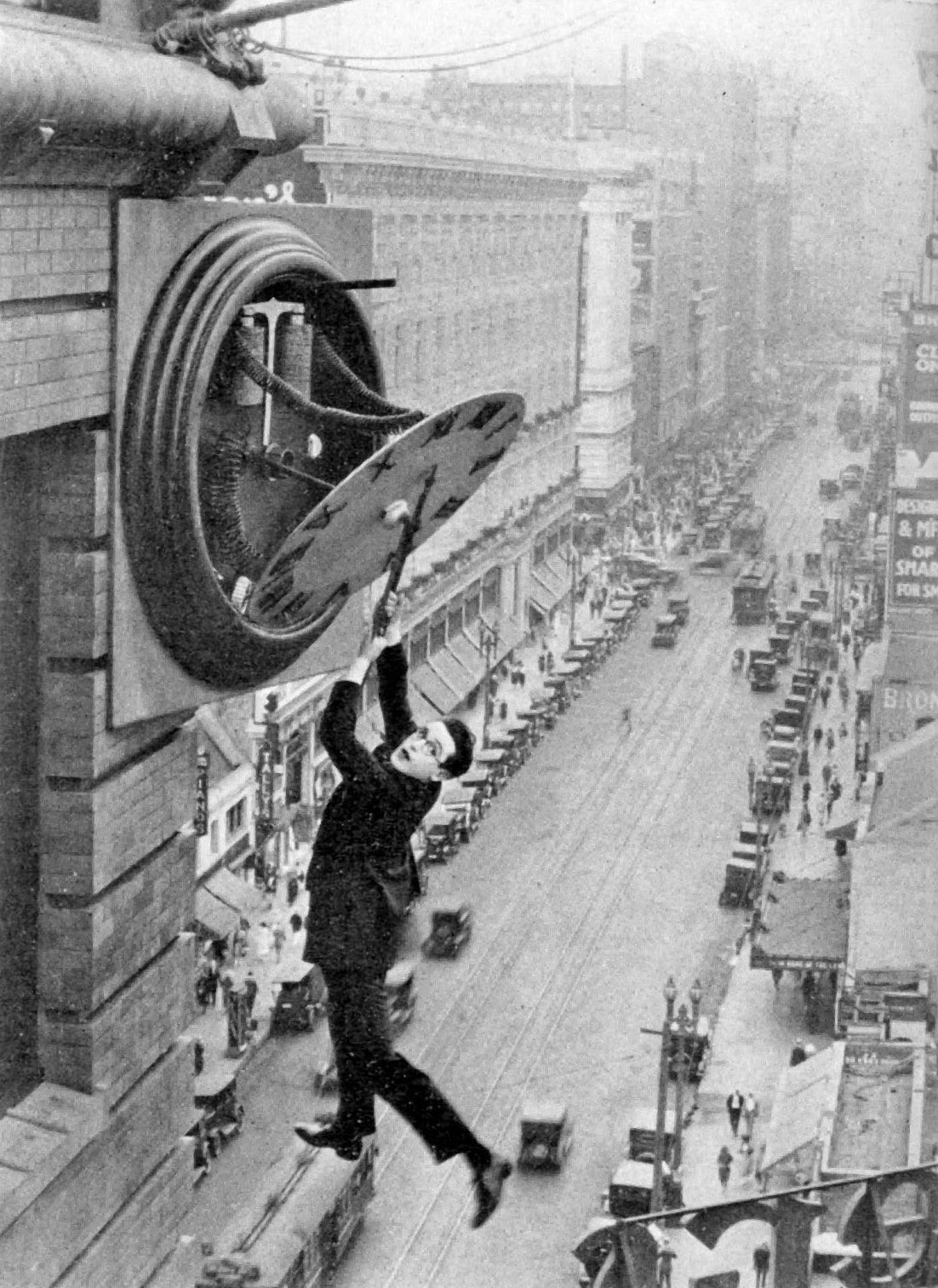
Harold Lloyd in 1923's Safety Last!, hanging (safely) from the clock tower. Lloyd may have been influenced by the real life stunts of Rodman Law a decade earlier.

Producer/actor Harold Lloyd's film Safety Last! of 1923, is often considered one of the first to deploy thought-through safety devices and pre-planning in the execution of its filming and stunts. In the script, Lloyd's "country boy" character goes to the city to be a success, and ends up climbing a tall building as a stunt. Critics at the time claimed it to be the most spectacular daredevil thrill comedy.

The entire stunt sequence was shot on location at the Atlantic Hotel on Broadway in Los Angeles (demolished 1957), at actual heights. But the films directors Fred C. Newmeyer and Sam Taylor planned into two safety features:

- Mattresses occupied hidden platforms under each performer, who also was wearing a heavily padded corset under their clothing.
- Each performer was attached via a safety harness to a secure safety wire, attached to the building.

Producer Hal Roach and Lloyd had been forced into the costs of planning and construction of these safety devices, as simply without them the city commissioners had refused the production a film permit. Lloyd, ever curious, decided after filming had completed to use a life-size cotton-filled dummy to see what the effect of an accident would have been should they have needed to use the required safety devices. On seeing the results, he didn't film another production without them.

In 1983 in his personal homage to Buster Keaton and Harold Lloyd called Project A, Jackie Chan repeats some of the most famous scenes from the early film era, including Lloyd's clock scene from Safety Last! While Lloyd only hanged from the tower, Chan took it a step further and actually fell from the tower.

=== Swashbuckler films ===
Swashbuckler films were a unique genre of action movies, utilising the earlier developed art of cinematic fencing, a combination of stage combat and fencing. The most famous of these were the films of Douglas Fairbanks, which defined the genre. The stories came from romantic costume novels, particularly those of Alexandre Dumas and Rafael Sabatini, and included triumphant, thrilling music. There were three great cycles of swashbuckler films: the Douglas Fairbanks period from 1920 to 1929; the Errol Flynn period from 1935 to 1941; and a period in the 1950s heralded by films, including Ivanhoe (1952) and The Master of Ballantrae (1953), and the popularity of the British television series The Adventures of Robin Hood (1955–1959).

=== Action movies ===
The preference to employ ready existing professionals from outside the film industry, either as performers or doubles, continued in the period both up to and beyond World War II, when again the industry was awash with young, fit men looking for work. However, in 1958 Thunder Road starring Robert Mitchum, with stunt coordinator Carey Loftin and a stunt team including Ray Austin, Neil Castes Sr., Robert Hoy, and Dale Van Sickel, introduced the era of the car chase movie. With the later development of modern action movie, the accident rate of both stunt performers and movie stars started to quickly increase. The stunt performers took action to professionalise their industry, with the creation of new stunt performer run registration, training, certification, and booking agencies.

In the 1960s, modern stunt technology was developed, including air rams, air bags, and bullet squibs. Dar Robinson invented the decelerator during this period, which used dragline cables rather than airbags for stunts that called for a jump from high places. The co-development of this technology and professional performance training continues to evolve to the present, brought about through the need to not only create more visual impact on screen in the modern action movie era. It also provides a safe platform to a new breed of trained professional stunt performers, including Bill Hickman, Terry Richards, and motorcycle greats Bud Ekins and Evel Knievel. These new professionals were not only driven to create visual impact, but also perform seemingly impossible feats in a safe and repeatable manner. Latterly came the fast action Martial arts movies as a distinct genre, originating for western consumption mainly from Hong Kong from the 1940s, choreographed and later acted in by stunt performers turned stars including Bruce Lee and Sonny Chiba from the 1960s, Kent Norman "Superkentman" Elofson, and latterly Jackie Chan.

=== Hong Kong action cinema ===
In 1982, Jackie Chan began experimenting with elaborate stunt action sequences in Dragon Lord, which featured a pyramid fight scene that holds the record for the most takes required for a single scene, with 2900 takes, and the final fight scene where he performs various stunts, including one where he does a back flip off a loft and falls to the lower ground. In 1983, Project A saw the official formation of the Jackie Chan Stunt Team and added elaborate, dangerous stunts to the fights and typical slapstick humor (at one point, Chan falls from the top of a clock tower through a series of fabric canopies).

Police Story (1985) contained many large-scale action scenes, including an opening sequence featuring a car chase through a shanty town, Chan stopping a double-decker bus with his service revolver and a climactic fight scene in a shopping center. This final scene earned the film the nickname "Glass Story" by the crew, due to the huge number of panes of sugar glass that were broken. During a stunt in this last scene, in which Chan slides down a pole from several stories up, the lights covering the pole had heated it considerably, resulting in Chan suffering second-degree burns, particularly to his hands, as well as a back injury and dislocation of his pelvis upon landing. Chan performed similarly elaborate stunts in numerous other films, such as several Police Story sequels, Project A Part II, the Armor of God series, Dragons Forever, Drunken Master II and Rumble in the Bronx among others.

Other Hong Kong action movie stars who became known for performing elaborate stunts include Chan's Peking Opera School friends Sammo Hung and Yuen Biao, as well as "girls with guns" stars such as Michelle Yeoh and Moon Lee. Other Asian cinema stars also known for performing elaborate stunts include Thai actor Tony Jaa; Indonesian actors Iko Uwais and Yayan Ruhian; and Indian actors Jayan, Ajith Kumar, Akshay Kumar, Puneeth Rajkumar, Vidyut Jammwal and Tiger Shroff.

== Awards ==
There is no Oscar category for stunt performance, but in 1967, Yakima Canutt was awarded an Academy Honorary Award for his stunt career. Hal Needham joined him in 2012, while Jackie Chan was awarded one in 2016 with his "inventive stunt work" being cited. The Academy of Television Arts and Sciences awards an Emmy for stunt coordinators.

The Taurus World Stunt Awards gives stunt people their own annual awards, but also through its foundation offers financial support to stunt men around the world who have been injured while on the job.

== Deaths ==
Although the stories that stuntmen died while filming Ben Hur and Where Eagles Dare are apocryphal, life-threatening injuries and deaths do occur. Contracts often stipulate that the footage may be used if the performer is injured or dies during filming, and some filmmakers such as Jackie Chan consider it disrespectful not to do so.

A University of Illinois study from the 1980s lists accidents and fatalities from films during that era, concluding that it seemed probable that the tendency of film audiences to be interested in ever more dangerous film stunts would likely see increasing fatality rates.

List of deaths of stunt performers killed while performing
Year	Production	Stunt performer	Notes
1959	The Horse Soldiers	Fred Kennedy	Late in the film, while John Wayne's raiding Union Army troop are fleeing the Confederate Army, a stuntman falls from his horse during the scene where a bridge is blown up. The cause of death was the fall rather than the explosion. Kennedy was a good friend of director John Ford, who was devastated by the death.
1960	Flower on the Stone	Inna Burduchenko	Burduchenko's character was saving the Red banner from a burning shack. The wooden shack collapsed during filming and she received severe burns, covering 78% of her body. She died two weeks later from her injuries. She was in her third month of pregnancy.
1965	The Flight of the Phoenix	Paul Mantz	Reputedly the best stunt pilot in the history of Hollywood. On July 8, 1965, while flying the unusual Tallmantz Phoenix P-1 built especially for the film, Mantz struck a small hillock while skimming over a desert site in Arizona for a second take. As he attempted to recover by opening the throttle to its maximum, the over-stressed aircraft broke in two and nosed over into the ground, killing Mantz instantly. Bobby Rose, a stuntman standing behind Mantz in the cockpit and representing a character played by Hardy Kruger, was seriously injured. Thirteen years later, Mantz's business partner Frank Tallman also died in an aviation accident.
1965	Director	Yevgeni Urbansky	On November 5, 1965, on the set, 40 km from Bukhara, a scene was shot of a motorcade driving through the sands. Following the screenplay, the car driven by Urbansky rushed through the dunes, jumping from one of the dunes. The first take went fine, but the retake saw the car suddenly roll over in the air. Urbansky died from injuries on his way to the hospital.
1966	Le Saint prend l'affût	Gil Delamare	While filming on a portion of highway which was under construction, Delamare, who was doubling for Jean Marais, had a spin in a Renault Caravelle convertible, which overturned and killed him.
1967	Les Grandes Vacances	Jean Falloux	Killed while filming an aerial stunt. The film is dedicated to him
1969	Shark!	José Marco	During production, while doubling for Burt Reynolds and approaching what was supposed to be a sedated shark, Marco was attacked and subsequently died of his injuries. When the production company used the death to promote the film (even re-titling the film to Shark!), director Samuel Fuller, who had been arguing with the producers on several major issues relating to the film, quit the production.
1978	Steel	A. J. Bakunas	Died performing a stunt fall from Kincaid Towers. Although Bakunas completed the stunt perfectly, he was mortally wounded when the airbag he made his landing on split. He died the following day in hospital.
1980	Kolilakkam	Jayan	Died filming the climactic scene in Sholavaram, near Chennai. After successfully filming the required three shots to show him boarding an airborne helicopter from a moving motorbike, Jayan insisted on yet another re-take, during which the helicopter lost its balance and crashed. Later succumbed to his injuries.
1982	Twilight Zone: The Movie	Vic Morrow; Myca Dinh Le; Renee Shin-Yi Chen	Main article: Twilight Zone accident On the morning of 23 July 1982, actor Morrow and two children, Myca Dinh Le (age seven), and Renee Shin-Yi Chen (age six), were filming on location in Ventura County, California, between Santa Clarita and Piru, under director John Landis. An in-scene helicopter pursuing them was damaged by pyrotechnic explosions, causing it to crash and kill all three instantly.
1985	Airwolf (TV series)	Reid Rondell	Died during a helicopter explosion on Jan. 18, 1985 while working on the show.
1985	Top Gun	Art Scholl	The renowned aerobatic pilot was hired to do in-flight camera work. The original script called for a flat spin, which Scholl was to perform and capture on a camera on the aircraft. The aircraft was observed to spin through its recovery altitude, at which time Scholl radioed "I have a problem... I have a real problem". He was unable to recover from the spin and crashed his Pitts S-2 into the Pacific Ocean near Carlsbad on September 16, 1985. Neither Scholl's body nor his aircraft were recovered, leaving the official cause of the accident unknown. Top Gun was dedicated to the memory of Art Scholl.
1986	Million Dollar Mystery	Dar Robinson	After completing the main stunt, Robinson dismissed emergency medical staff from the set. Then, while filming a routine high speed run, he rode his stunt motorcycle past the braking point of a turn and straight off a cliff.
1987	Skip Tracer	Vic Magnotta	After driving a car into the Hudson River, Magnotta was killed after the windshield collapsed leaving him trapped inside.
1989	Gone in 60 Seconds 2	H. B. Halicki	Star and director of the original Gone in 60 Seconds (1974). While filming in Dunkirk and Buffalo, New York, a safety cable holding a 160 feet (49 m) tall water tower snapped, shearing off a telephone pole which fell and killed him instantly. The script eventually became Gone in 60 Seconds.
1991	Holdup! The Train Robbery	Yuri Gusev	During the filming Gusev sustained a basilar skull fracture. He died in Tashkent on January 18, 1991, from the sustained injuries.
1993	The Crow	Brandon Lee	Lee was killed by a squib load from an incorrectly loaded .44 Magnum gun, fired by actor Michael Massee's character. The footage of his death was used as evidence in the following police investigation, then later destroyed as part of the lawsuit settlement.
1993	999 (TV series)	Tip Tipping	While recreating a luck-escape accident of a fellow parachutist for the BBC series, Tipping died in an accident at Brunton, Northumberland.
1994	Vampire in Brooklyn	Sonja Davis	Killed while falling backwards off a 42 feet (13 m) wall inside a studio. The over-inflated airbag acted like a balloon, so that she bounced off it via the wall onto the studio floor. Spent 13 days in hospital in a coma before succumbing to her injuries.
1997	Gone Fishin'	Janet Wilder	Janet Wilder was killed when a boat that was made to jump a ramp in one of the scenes landed on top of her. Wilder's husband and father-in-law were also injured.
1998	The Crow: Stairway to Heaven	Marc Akerstream	While filming at Minaty Bay, Vancouver, British Columbia, he was hit by flying debris while observing an explosion of a rowboat. Subsequently, died of sustained head injuries.
2000	I Dare You: The Ultimate Challenge	Brady Michaels	Fell off a ladder about 20 feet (6.1 m) from the ground while rigging a platform for a stunt he was going to perform.
2000	Exit Wounds	Chris Lamon	Suffered a head injury when jumping out of an upside-down van which was being towed along a street as part of a chase scene; he lost his footing and struck his head on the pavement. Another stuntman suffered a concussion in the same incident. Lamon died in a Toronto hospital six days later.
2002	XXX	Harry O'Connor	While doubling for Vin Diesel, was killed when he hit a pillar of the Palacky Bridge in Prague, parasailing during one of the action scenes. The accident occurred while filming the second take of the stunt; O'Connor's first attempt was completed without incident and can be seen in the completed film.
2009	Red Cliff: Part II	Lu Yan Qing	While filming a scene in which a burning small boat intending to ram a larger boat, the fire quickly spread out of control, killing stuntman Lu Yanqing and injuring six others.
2009	Invisible Eyes	Peyman Abadi	He died in 2009 in an accident during filming of the movie Invisible Eyes.
2012	The Expendables 2	Kun Liu	Was killed, and another stuntman (Nuo Sun) was critically injured, in a staged explosion on a rubber boat.
2017	Deadpool 2	Joi Harris	She was killed while filming a motorcycle stunt, doubling as "Domino", when the bike she was driving crashed near the Shaw Tower.
2017	The Walking Dead	John Bernecker	He fell from 6 m (20 ft) high while performing a stunt. He missed the safety net by a few inches.
2025	Vettuvam	SM Raju	He was driving a car at high speed during a chase scene when it overturned, and he was declared dead at the scene.

== See also ==
- Archie Butler (actor)
- Human firecracker
- Pyrotechnician
- Second unit
- Special effect
- Taurus World Stunt Awards
