= T.J. Miller =

American comedian and actor (born 1981)

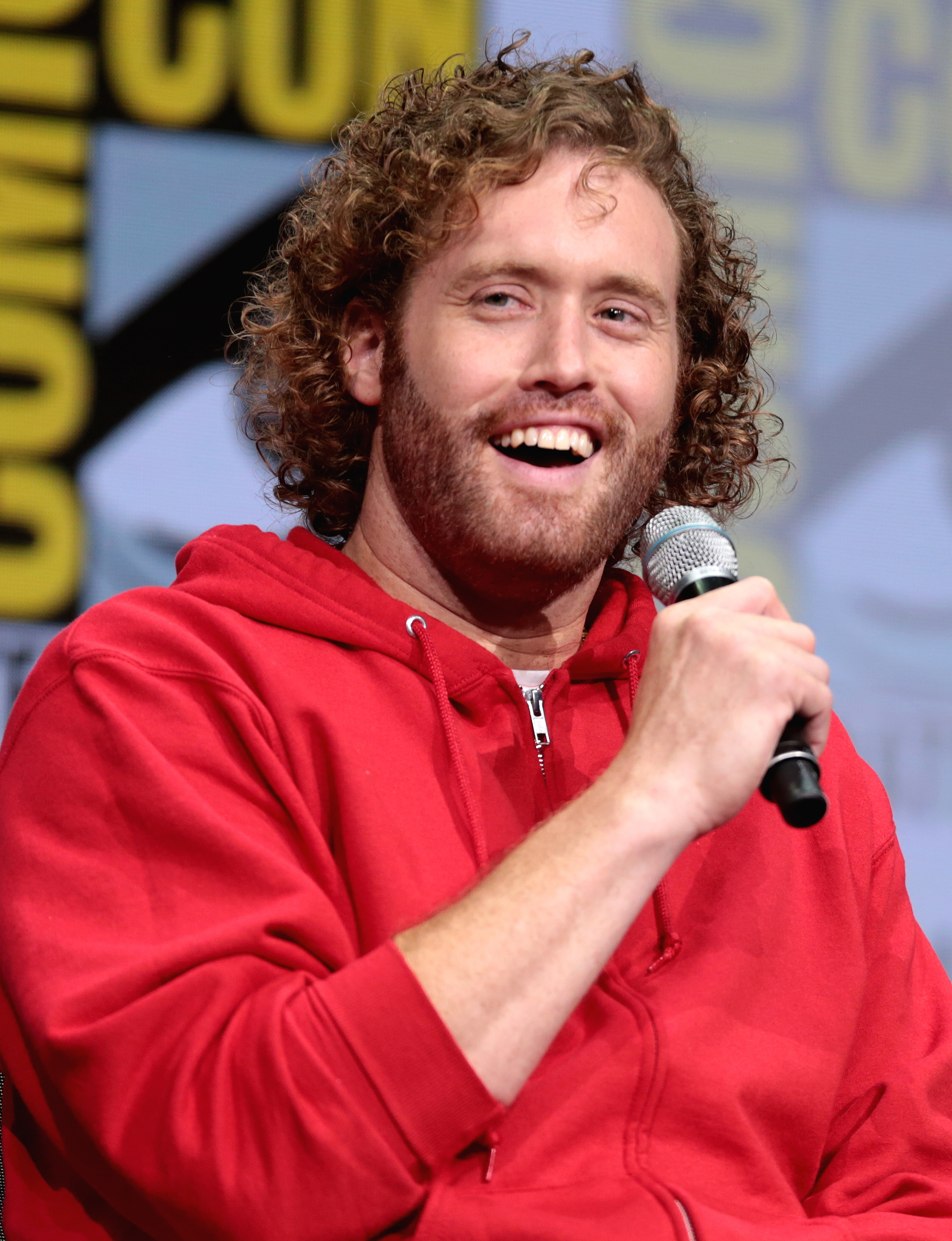
- Miller at the 2017 San Diego Comic-Con
- Born: Todd Joseph Miller; June 4, 1981 (age 45); Denver, Colorado, U.S.
- Education: George Washington University (BA)
- Occupations: Stand-up comedian; actor; producer; screenwriter
- Years active: 2007–present
- Spouse: Kate Gorney (m. 2015)
- Website: tjmillerdoesnothaveawebsite.com

Todd Joseph Miller (born June 4, 1981) is an American stand-up comedian, actor, producer, and screenwriter. He played Erlich Bachman in the HBO sitcom Silicon Valley (2014–2017) and the Marvel Comics character Weasel in the superhero comedy film Deadpool (2016) and its 2018 sequel.

Miller took supporting roles in comedies such as Yogi Bear (2010), Seeking a Friend for the End of the World (2012), and Goon: Last of the Enforcers (2017) as well in action films such as Unstoppable (2010), Transformers: Age of Extinction (2014), Ready Player One (2018), and Underwater (2020). He also voiced characters in the How to Train Your Dragon films (2010–2014) and the television series DreamWorks Dragons (2012–2018), as well as Big Hero 6 (2014), Hell and Back (2015) and The Emoji Movie (2017).

== Early life and education ==
Todd Joseph Miller was born on June 4, 1981, in Denver, Colorado, the son of Leslie Miller, a clinical psychologist, and Kent Miller, an attorney from Chanute, Kansas. He attended Graland Country Day School and graduated from Denver's East High School, where he participated in drama productions.

In 2003, Miller graduated from George Washington University in Washington, D.C., with a B.A. in psychology with a concentration in persuasion theory and social influence. At GWU, he was a member of the comedy group Recess. While in college, Miller studied the circus arts at Frichess Theatre Urbain in Paris and attended the British American Drama Academy in London, where he studied Shakespeare for a summer.

== Career ==
=== Stand-up ===
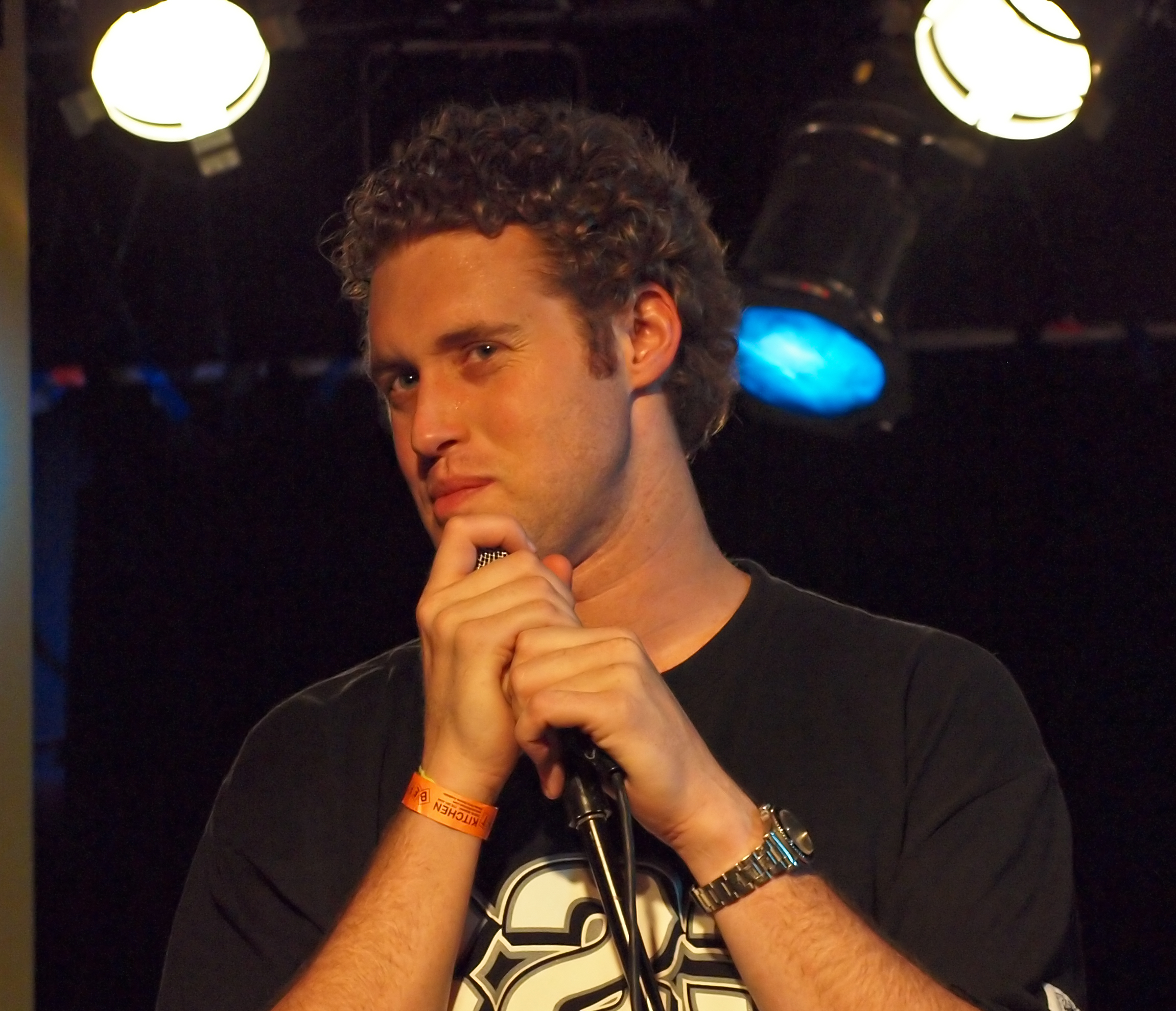
Miller performing in 2010

After college, Miller moved to Chicago to perform improvisation and stand-up comedy, performing with many local troupes. He toured with The Second City for two years. In 2008, he was named one of Variety's 10 Comics to Watch. In 2011, he released a comedy special, No Real Reason, and a comedy album, Mash Up Audiofile in 2012.

In 2015, Miller was part of Funny or Die's Oddball Comedy and Curiosity Festival, a touring show which included Amy Schumer, Aziz Ansari, and other comics. On June 17, 2017, HBO premiered his hour-long stand-up special, T.J. Miller: Meticulously Ridiculous, which was filmed in Miller's native Denver at the end of his 2016 Meticulously Ridiculous Tour. In October 2017, Miller began his Touring in Perpetuity Tour, a self-described "One Man Philosophy Circus".

=== Television ===
Miller appeared frequently as a member of the "round table" on Chelsea Lately. He appeared as Marmaduke Brooker in Carpoolers, which ran for thirteen episodes on ABC in 2007–2008. In 2012, he voiced Robbie Valentino on the Disney channel cartoon Gravity Falls. On December 13, 2010, October 28, 2011, and June 14, 2012, he performed stand-up on Conan. On November 15, 2011, his stand-up special No Real Reason premiered on Comedy Central. In 2011, he hosted a special called Mash Up, which was picked up in 2012 for a full season by Comedy Central. He starred in the Fox TV series The Goodwin Games as Jimmy Goodwin.

Miller starred in the HBO sitcom Silicon Valley, which was met with widespread critical acclaim and he won the Critics' Choice Television Award for Best Supporting Actor in a Comedy Series in 2015. In May 2017, Miller and HBO jointly announced that Miller would not be returning for the fifth season of Silicon Valley. Series creator Mike Judge later revealed that Miller was removed from the show for failing to show up to work, and for coming to work "seemingly under the influence".

As a commercial actor, Miller voiced a talking ball of mucus known as “Mr. Mucus” in commercials for Mucinex and starred as Greg the Genie in a promotional campaign for Slim Jim meat snacks. He voiced Gorburger, a giant blue monster talk show host, on The Gorburger Show, which originally aired on Funny or Die and YouTube for two seasons in 2012–13, then on Comedy Central for a third season in 2017 before being canceled.

=== Film ===
In Cloverfield, Miller's film debut, he appeared onscreen for only a few minutes, but his voice was heard in almost every scene as the character who videotaped most of the events depicted. In 2009, he played Cessna Jim in The Goods: Live Hard, Sell Hard and the dim-witted grindcore musician Rory in Mike Judge's comedy Extract. In 2010, he co-starred in She's Out of My League as Stainer, played Brian the Concierge in Get Him to the Greek and appeared in a supporting role in the film Unstoppable.

Miller voiced the character Tuffnut Thorston in the Oscar-nominated animated films How to Train Your Dragon and How to Train Your Dragon 2. He also played Dan in Gulliver's Travels, released in December 2010. He played the supporting character of Ranger Jones in the live-action/animated Yogi Bear 2010 film. Unlike his character on the cartoon show, he is "dumb-but-not-in-a-funny-way", according to the Buffalo News. He was cast in the part after two auditions; as a joke, he sent Warner Bros. an improvised video audition with an actual bear, though he had already been offered the part before they received it.

In 2011, Miller appeared in the film Our Idiot Brother. He had a cameo as administrative personnel for Rolling Stone in the 2012 film Rock of Ages. He starred in the 2016 film Search Party alongside Adam Pally. In 2014, he appeared in Transformers: Age of Extinction. In November 2014, he was the voice of Fred in the superhero CGI film Big Hero 6. He also played Weasel in Deadpool and Deadpool 2. In 2017, he portrayed the voice of the main protagonist Gene, a meh emoji with abnormal expressions, in the animated The Emoji Movie, which received extremely negative reviews. In late March 2018, he appeared in a supporting role as I-R0K in the film Ready Player One, which was directed by Steven Spielberg.

=== Audio ===
On September 12, 2011, Miller released a comedy rap concept album titled The Extended Play E.P. The album features comedians Bo Burnham, Doug Benson, Pete Holmes and hip-hop artists Ugly Duckling and Johnny Polygon. In 2012, Miller released The Extended Play E.P. Illegal Art Remix Tape. Also in 2012, Miller released Mash Up Audiofile on Comedy Central Records to mixed reviews. Miller started appearing on Chicago-based comedy podcast Red Bar Radio in 2006 as a semi-regular co-host. He hosts a podcast with friend and fellow comedian Cash Levy, titled Cashing in with TJ Miller, which began airing in March 2012 on the artist Network. He is also a frequent guest on Doug Benson's podcast Doug Loves Movies.

== Personal life ==
In 2014, Miller became engaged to his longtime girlfriend, actress and installation artist Kate Gorney, who changed her last name to Miller. They were married at the Denver Botanic Gardens on September 6, 2015. Miller described learning about an undiagnosed cerebral arteriovenous malformation on his right frontal lobe on the Pete Holmes podcast You Made It Weird on October 28, 2011. He stated that he became more philosophical, narrated his behaviors, and was unable to sleep while filming Yogi Bear in New Zealand in 2010. His brain surgery was successful, though there was a ten percent risk of fatality. Miller speaks fluent Spanish. Miller considers himself a "positive nihilist".

== Controversies ==
=== Physical assault allegation ===
On December 9, 2016, Miller was arrested and jailed in Los Angeles for allegedly assaulting an Uber driver. He was released on his own recognizance after bail was set at $20,000. Miller reached a settlement with the driver in March 2018.

=== Sexual assault allegation ===
In late 2017, an allegation against Miller from his time in college in 2001 resurfaced, part of the MeToo movement and Weinstein effect. An anonymous woman who attended George Washington University with Miller told The Daily Beast reporter Asawin Suebsaeng that Miller became violent with her during a sexual encounter; he allegedly choked, shook, and punched her in the mouth. Suebsaeng contacted witnesses who corroborated the accuser's story and confirmed that the assault was reported to the college at the time. Student conduct proceedings were held, the results of which are sealed, although Suebsaeng wrote that "knowledgeable sources" had said that he was declared to be "expelled" at the conclusion of the proceedings.

Miller and his wife responded to the allegation, characterizing the accuser as a vindictive former colleague in a campus comedy troupe who was asked to leave due to inappropriate behavior. The statement said:

We met this woman over a decade ago while studying together in college, she attempted to break us up back then by plotting for over a year before making contradictory claims and accusations. She attempted to discredit both of our voices and use us against one another by trying to portray Kate to be a continuous abuse victim of T.J. (further efforts to hurt the two of us). She was asked to leave our university comedy group because of worrisome and disturbing behavior, which angered her immensely, she then became fixated on our relationship, and began telling people around campus 'I'm going to destroy them' & 'I'm going to ruin him'. [...] Sadly she is now using the current climate to bandwagon and launch these false accusations again. It is unfortunate that she is choosing this route as it undermines the important movement to make women feel safe coming forward about legitimate claims against real known predators.

In response to the controversy, DreamWorks Animation removed Miller from How to Train Your Dragon: The Hidden World and had Justin Rupple dub over his lines.

=== Amtrak bomb threat incident ===
Miller was arrested on the night of April 9, 2018, at LaGuardia Airport in Queens, New York, on federal charges related to a fake bomb threat made while aboard an Amtrak train. According to a Department of Justice press release, he placed an emergency call on March 18, 2018, and reported that a female passenger had "a bomb in her bag" while traveling on Amtrak train #2256 from Washington, D.C., toward New York Penn Station. After authorities evacuated passengers and searched Amtrak Train 2256, it turned out that Miller was actually on train #2258, which was also evacuated of passengers and searched.

No evidence of any explosive device or materials was detected after officials stopped and inspected both trains. According to witnesses interviewed by Amtrak investigators, he appeared to be heavily intoxicated and involved "in hostile exchanges with a woman who was sitting in a different row from him in the first-class car", and that he had been removed from the train prior to his intended stop due to his intoxication. On April 10, 2018, he was released on a $100,000 bond following an appearance at a federal court hearing in New Haven, Connecticut.

In July 2021, the charges against Miller were dismissed. Prosecutors said their decision was based on "expert medical analyses and reports regarding the defendant's prior brain surgery and its continued neurological impacts, which cast doubt upon the requisite legal element of intent to commit the charged offense." Miller agreed to "make full financial restitution for the costs of the law enforcement response to the false 911 call, and to continue a thorough and necessary program of cognitive remediation to render any recurrence of such conduct most highly unlikely".

== Filmography ==
=== Film ===
Year	Title	Role	Notes
2008	Cloverfield	Hudson "Hud" Platt	
2009	The Goods: Live Hard, Sell Hard	Cessna Jim	
2009	Extract	Rory	
2010	She's Out of My League	Stainer	
2010	Get Him to the Greek	Brian	
2010	How to Train Your Dragon	Tuffnut Thorston	Voice
2010	Unstoppable	Gilleece	
2010	Yogi Bear	Ranger Jones	
2010	Legend of the Boneknapper Dragon	Tuffnut Thorston	Voice, short film
2010	Gulliver's Travels	Dan Quint	
2010	Successful Alcoholics	Drake	Short film, also co-writer
2011	Our Idiot Brother	Billy Orwin	
2011	Charlie on Parole	Charlie	Short film
2011	Gift of the Night Fury	Tuffnut Thorston	Voice, short film
2012	Rock of Ages	Rolling Stone Receptionist	
2012	Seeking a Friend for the End of the World	Darcy	
2014	How to Train Your Dragon 2	Tuffnut Thorston	Voice
2014	Transformers: Age of Extinction	Lucas Flannery	
2014	Dawn of the Dragon Racers	Tuffnut Thorston	Voice, short film
2014	Big Hero 6	Fred	Voice
2014	Search Party	Jason	
2014	Jason Nash Is Married	Tidal	
2015	Hell and Back	Augie	Voice
2016	Deadpool	Weasel	
2016	Office Christmas Party	Clay Vanstone	
2017	Goon: Last of the Enforcers	Chad Bailey	
2017	The Emoji Movie	Gene	Voice; Razzie Award for Worst Screen Combo (as an emoji; shared with any obnoxious emoji)
2018	Ready Player One	i-R0k	
2018	Deadpool 2	Weasel	
2019	How to Train Your Dragon: The Hidden World	Tuffnut Thorston	Voice; lines overdubbed by Justin Rupple
2020	Underwater	Paul Abel	
2020	The Stand-In	Louis	
2023	Out of the Loop	Self	Documentary
TBA	A.I. Heart U	Marco	Post-Production

=== Television ===
Year	Title	Role	Notes
2007–2011	Carpoolers	Marmaduke Brooker	13 episodes
2007–2011	Traffic Light	Jason	Episode: "Breaking Bread"
2007–2011	Happy Endings	Jason Shershow	Episode: "The Shershow Redemption"
2007–2011	The League	Gabriel	Episode: "The Light of Genesis"
2007–2011	Fact Checkers Unit	Cop	Episode: "Excessive Gass"
2007–2011	T.J. Miller: No Real Reason	Himself	Stand-up special
2011	Ice Age: A Mammoth Christmas	Prancer	Voice, television short
2012	Romantic Encounters	Toy Story 5	Episode: "Toy Story 5"
2012	How to Rock	Danny Mango	2 episodes
2012–2013	The Gorburger Show	Gorburger	16 episodes; also writer
2012–2016	Gravity Falls	Robbie Stacy Valentino	Voice, 13 episodes
2012–2018	DreamWorks Dragons	Tuffnut Thorston	Voice, 82 episodes
2013, 2014	American Dad!	Benji, Cowboy	Voice, 2 episodes
2013	The Goodwin Games	Jimmy Goodwin	7 episodes
2013	This Is Not Happening	Himself	Episode: "T.J. Miller Has a Seizure"
2013	The Jeselnik Offensive	Himself	3 episodes
2013	High School USA!	Brad Slovee	Voice, 12 episodes
2014	Garfunkel and Oates	Matthew	Episode: "Speechless"; uncredited
2014–2017	Silicon Valley	Erlich Bachman	38 episodes Critics' Choice Television Award for Best Supporting Actor in a Comedy Series (2015); Nominated–Critics' Choice Television Award for Best Supporting Actor in a Comedy Series (2016)
2015	Family Guy	Premature Volcano	Voice, episode: "Roasted Guy"
2016	21st Critics' Choice Awards	Himself	Host
2016, 2019	Those Who Can't	Uncle Jake	2 episodes
2016	22nd Critics' Choice Awards	Himself	Host
2016	Lip Sync Battle	Himself	Episode: "Sam Richardson vs. T.J. Miller"
2017	The Gorburger Show	Gorburger	8 episodes; also writer and executive producer
2017	Crashing	Himself	2 episodes
2017	T.J. Miller: Meticulously Ridiculous	Himself	Stand-up special
2021	F Is for Family	Randy	Voice, 5 episodes

=== Video games ===
Year	Title	Voice role
2010	How to Train Your Dragon	Tuffnut Thorston
2010	Yogi Bear	Ranger Jones
2019	Kingdom Hearts III	Fred
