= King George Tower =

- Interactive map of the King George Tower area

General information
- Status: Proposed
- Type: Mixed-use
- Location: Surrey, British Columbia
- Coordinates: 49.1835°N 122.8435°W
- Estimated completion: Not yet known
- Opening: Not yet known

Height
- Roof: 274.3 metres (900 ft)

Technical details
- Floor count: 81

Design and construction
- Architect: James KM Cheng Architects
- Developer: Jung Developments

King George Tower was a proposed skyscraper in Surrey, British Columbia near King George Station. At a height of 274.3 m (900 ft) with 81 stories, the mixed-use building would have been significantly taller than any highrise building in the Vancouver area. The skyscraper also would have had the most floors of any building in Canada, exceeding the 78 floors of Aura in Toronto, Ontario. However, due to the proposed height of the project, there was concern that the skyscraper may interfere with air traffic heading to Vancouver International Airport.

== See also ==
- Royal eponyms in Canada
