= Weasel (Marvel Comics) =

Fictional character in Marvel Comics

- Weasel as seen in Cable & Deadpool. Art by Reilly Brown.

Publication information
- Publisher: Marvel Comics
- First appearance: Cable #3 (July 1993)
- Created by: Fabian Nicieza; Klaus Janson

In-story information
- Alter ego: Jack Hammer
- Supporting character of: Deadpool
- Notable aliases: The Penetrator; Penetraitor; The House; Patient Zero
- Abilities: Expert hacker and inventor Genius-level intellect Knowledge of weaponry

Weasel (Jack Hammer) is a fictional character appearing in American comic books published by Marvel Comics. Weasel is a friend, sidekick, information broker and arms dealer for Deadpool. Weasel is perhaps Deadpool's best friend. However, because of his frequent mood swings and tenuous mental state, Deadpool still often abuses or mistreats him. Weasel has also displayed an opportunistic streak against his friend's interests on occasions.

T.J. Miller portrayed the character in the films Deadpool (2016) and Deadpool 2 (2018).

== Publication history ==
Created by writer Fabian Nicieza and artist Klaus Janson, Weasel first appeared in Cable #3 (July 1993).

== Fictional character biography ==
Jack Hammer is a student at Empire State University, where he was a classmate of Peter Parker and Gwen Stacy. He competed with Parker for a prestigious job under the wing of Norman Osborn and had an enormous crush on Stacy, Parker's future girlfriend. After being teleported to the past during a fight with the Great Lakes Avengers, Deadpool encounters Hammer, whose future he was well aware of. Disguised as Peter Parker, Deadpool gives Norman Osborn false information about Hammer being a drug user. His employment opportunity ruined, Hammer is manipulated into fixing Deadpool's teleportation belt. With the gadget fixed, Deadpool returns to the future, leaving a depressed and drunken young Hammer with a new career option: crime.

Hammer assumes the alias of Weasel and becomes a data and weapon broker, sometimes partaking in mercenary activities himself. Weasel becomes an able informant and arms supplier to Deadpool and eventually forms an uneasy friendship with him. Taskmaster abducts Weasel in order to procure his services. Weasel chooses to return to Deadpool's services, encouraged in part by Deadpool's show of compassion for him and the promise of a new cable connection to the Playboy Channel.

When Weasel makes repeated visits to Deadpool's friend/prisoner Blind Al, Deadpool places them both in the Box, a dark room filled with sharp objects and instruments of torture. Weasel decides to move on and left Deadpool after escaping from the Box, hoping to define his life outside of his association with Deadpool.

Some time later, Deadpool is killed, resurrected, and left with amnesia. Weasel helps to restore Deadpool's memory and thus restores their friendship before leaving once more. An on-again off-again association between the two occurred after this point, with Deadpool sometimes asking for goods or working with Weasel.

=== "The House" ===
Weasel returns in Deadpool (vol. 2) as Las Vegas hero "The House". He is funded by the local casinos and takes pleasure at the chance to fight Deadpool. Using his vast knowledge of Deadpool, he quickly traps and defeats him, ultimately locking Wade in his own version of the Box. Deadpool escapes and offers Weasel a chance to double his earnings. He then takes Weasel's extra suit of armor and the alias "Wildcard", acting as House's sidekick.

Later, in an encounter with Grizzly, unbeknownst to Weasel, Deadpool secretly tells Grizzly about a proposition he has for him. Grizzly manages to escape, and later, when Weasel and Deadpool meet with the casino owners, Deadpool reveals that he is Wildcard, much to Weasel's fury. Later, Wade persuades Weasel to switch suits so that all the praise Wildcard gets will be for Weasel's good deeds. Weasel agrees to the plan, and the two once again face off with Grizzly, now back again and attempting to steal the millions of dollars in the casino's counting room. When Deadpool runs off with Grizzly and the cash, Weasel seeks revenge. Weasel apparently kills Deadpool, but he is later revealed to have survived and imprisons Weasel in the Box.

Weasel is later freed from the Box by Macho Gomez, who recruits him to his team of people who were screwed over by, and want revenge on, Deadpool. Weasel begins having second thoughts and manages to escape unscathed with Gomez's crew.

=== Patient Zero ===
After being killed by Macho Gomez, Weasel is condemned to Hell. He escapes Hell with the help of Mephisto and rechristens himself Patient Zero. Patient Zero sets out to get revenge on both Deadpool and Peter Parker, hiring Deadpool to kill Peter and stealing data from Parker Industries for use in transforming people into "Manstrosities". After the Manstrosities are defeated, Patient Zero injects Spider-Man and Deadpool's DNA samples into another test subject. This transforms her into Itsy Bitsy, a psychotic vigilante with the combined powers of Deadpool and Spider-Man. When his creation turns on him, Patient Zero reaches out to Spider-Man and Deadpool for aid and is killed in front of them by Itsy Bitsy.

Weasel is later resurrected by Mephisto when Deadpool agrees to collect souls for Mephisto. When revived, Weasel lacks the powers he had as Patient Zero.

== Powers and abilities ==
Jack Hammer is a hacker and inventor with what is said to be a genius-level intellect and knowledge of many weapons.

=== Equipment ===
Weasel has made use of Deadpool's teleportation device. He formerly worn the House armor, the Wildcard armor, and the Penetrator armor. Both the House armor and the Wildcard armor had repulsor beams.

== Other versions ==
An alternate universe version of Weasel appears in Deadpool Max. This version is a pimp, crime boss, and driver.

== In other media ==
=== Film ===
- Weasel appears in Deadpool, portrayed by T.J. Miller. This version is the owner/bartender of Sister Margaret's School for Wayward Children whose friendship with Wade Wilson is more mutual. Additionally, Weasel goes on to inspire Wilson's codename after betting against him in the "dead pool".
- Weasel appears in Deadpool 2, portrayed again by T.J. Miller. He assists Wilson in forming X-Force before Cable forces him to sell them out.

=== Video games ===
Weasel appears as a non-playable character in Marvel: Ultimate Alliance, voiced by Cam Clarke.
