= The Gorburger Show =

American comedy television series

- Also known as: The Gorburger Show with T.J. Miller
- Genre: Comedy
- Created by: Ryan McNeely; Josh Martin
- Starring: T.J. Miller
- Country of origin: United States
- Original language: English
- No. of seasons: 3
- No. of episodes: 27

Production
- Executive producers: Ryan McNeely; Josh Martin; T.J. Miller; Sean Boyle
- Running time: 22 minutes
- Production company: Funny or Die

Original release
- Network: Comedy Central
- Release: April 9 – June 4, 2017

The Gorburger Show is an American comedy television series created by Ryan McNeely and Josh Martin. The series stars T.J. Miller as Gorburger, a giant blue monster who took over a Japanese television station. The series originally aired on Funny or Die for two seasons from 2012 to 2013. Guests included Jack Black, Flea, Andrew W.K., Wayne Coyne, Carson Daly, Tegan and Sara and Eagles of Death Metal. On January 13, 2017, Comedy Central picked up the series for an eight-episode first season. The series premiered on April 9, 2017, on Comedy Central. On December 19, 2017, the series was canceled after one season.

== Series overview ==
| Season | Episodes | Originally released | | |
| Season | Episodes | First released | Last released | Network |
|---|---|---|---|---|
| 1 | 10 | September 24, 2012 | December 20, 2012 | Funny or Die |
| 2 | 9 | March 11, 2013 | May 13, 2013 | Funny or Die |
| TV | 8 | April 9, 2017 | June 4, 2017 | Comedy Central |

== Web series episodes ==
=== Season 1 (2012) ===
| No. overall | No. in season | Title | Original release date |
|---|---|---|---|
| 1 | 1 | "Tegan and Sara" | September 24, 2012 |
| 2 | 2 | "Mariachi el Bronx" | September 24, 2012 |
| 3 | 3 | "The Mars Volta" | October 1, 2012 |
| 4 | 4 | "3OH!3" | October 8, 2012 |
| 5 | 5 | "Le Butcherettes" | October 17, 2012 |
| 6 | 6 | "Dum Dum Girls" | October 22, 2012 |
| 7 | 7 | "Health" | November 6, 2012 |
| 8 | 8 | "Fool's Gold" | November 13, 2012 |
| 9 | 9 | "La Sera" | November 19, 2012 |
| 10 | 10 | "Andrew W.K." | December 20, 2012 |

=== Season 2 (2013) ===
| No. overall | No. in season | Title | Original release date |
|---|---|---|---|
| 11 | 1 | "Flea" | March 11, 2013 |
| 12 | 2 | "Grouplove" | March 18, 2013 |
| 13 | 3 | "MellowHype" | March 25, 2013 |
| 14 | 4 | "Carson Daly" | April 1, 2013 |
| 15 | 5 | "Wayne Coyne" | April 8, 2013 |
| 16 | 6 | "Bleached" | April 15, 2013 |
| 17 | 7 | "Henry Rollins" | April 22, 2013 |
| 18 | 8 | "King Tuff" | April 29, 2013 |
| 19 | 9 | "Jack Black, Eagles of Death Metal" | May 13, 2013 |

== Television series episodes ==
| No. | Title | Directed by | Written by | Original release date | Prod. code | US viewers (millions) |
|---|---|---|---|---|---|---|
| 1 | "Vape Is Life" | Unknown | Unknown | April 9, 2017 | 101 | 0.206 |
| 2 | "Jazz Bender" | Unknown | Unknown | April 16, 2017 | 102 | 0.295 |
| 3 | "Gorbabies" | Unknown | Unknown | April 23, 2017 | 103 | 0.231 |
| 4 | "Grizzleblub's Day" | Unknown | Unknown | April 30, 2017 | 104 | 0.157 |
| 5 | "Murder Most Mysterious" | Unknown | Unknown | May 7, 2017 | 105 | N/A |
| 6 | "Gorburger's Secret" | Unknown | Unknown | May 14, 2017 | 106 | 0.245 |
| 7 | "Ghostly" | Unknown | Unknown | May 21, 2017 | 107 | 0.284 |
| 8 | "Best of Gorburger" | Unknown | Unknown | June 4, 2017 | 108 | 0.115 |
