= Joi Harris =

American motorcycle racer

- Born: Sequana Joi Harris; December 11, 1976; Brooklyn, New York, U.S.
- Died: August 14, 2017 (aged 40); Vancouver, British Columbia, Canada
- Cause of death: Motorcycle accident
- Occupations: Motorcycle road racer; Motorcycle stuntwoman
- Years active: 2014–2017 (racer); 2017 (stuntwoman)

Sequana Joi Harris (December 11, 1976 – August 14, 2017) was an American motorcycle road racer and stuntwoman. She made history as the first African American woman to be licensed as a motorcycle road racer, racing professionally since 2014, after taking up motorcycling in 2009. She died while performing a motorcycle stunt, doubling for the character Domino on the set of Deadpool 2, Harris' bike crashed near the Rogers Tower during filming.

== Racing career ==
Harris promoted road racing to both women and the African American community. She learned to ride a motorcycle in 2009 and began racing in 2012. By 2013, she earned her racing license and made history in 2014 as the first African American woman to race professionally in motorcycle road racing. That same year, she established her own racing team, Threader Racing, competing under the number #24.

In 2017, Harris raced in the NJMP and SPR classes on the CCS circuit of ASRA where she achieved a victory during the 2017 circuit.

== Death ==
Harris was on her first stunt shoot for Deadpool 2, in 2017. On August 14, 2017, during filming, Harris was riding without a helmet after being instructed not to by TCF Vancouver in Downtown Vancouver, when she lost control of her bike, hit a curb, and was thrown into Rogers Tower. She had been doubling for actress Zazie Beetz, who portrayed Domino in Deadpool 2. Harris died at the scene.

Harris' death marked the second fatality in two months among stunt performers in North America, following the July death of stuntman John Bernecker on the set of The Walking Dead TV series. Deadpool 2 was dedicated to Harris.
