= James K. M. Cheng =

Canadian architect

James K. M. Cheng CM
- Born: Hong Kong
- Education: University of Washington (BArch); Harvard University (MArch)
- Occupation: Architect
- Website: jamescheng.com

James K. M. Cheng (Chinese: 鄭景明) is a Canadian architect best known for his condominium towers in Vancouver, British Columbia. Cheng's designs, most notably the highrise towers, are noted for their extensive use of glass and for their contribution to the architectural style known as Vancouverism.

== Life and work ==
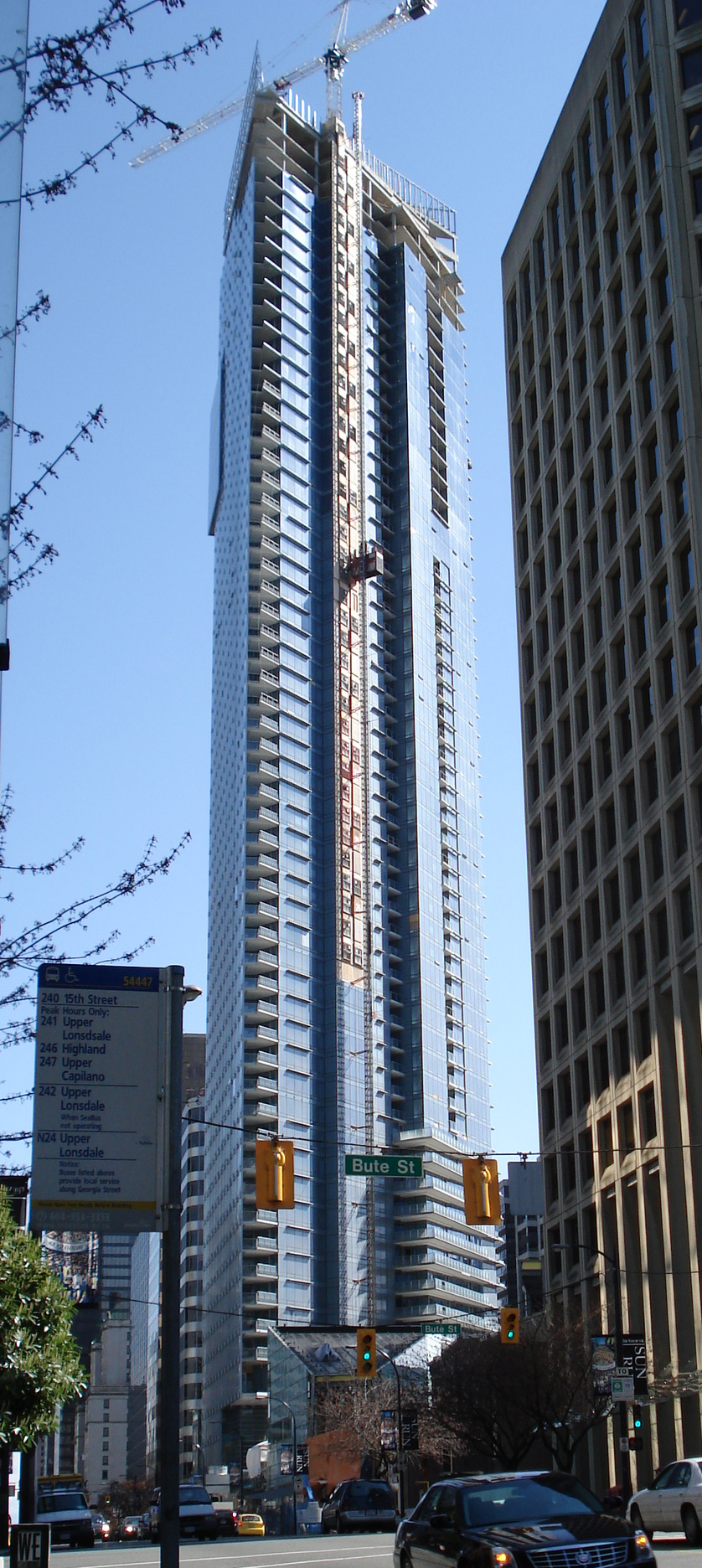
The Shangri-La Vancouver in the final stages of construction in 2008

Cheng was born in Hong Kong and educated at the University of Washington (B.Arch., 1970) and Harvard (M.Arch.) where he studied under Richard Meier. In Canada he then apprenticed under Arthur Erickson. He formed his own firm, James K.M. Cheng Architects Inc., in 1978 when he won the commission for the Chinese Cultural Centre in Vancouver. Beginning in the 1990s Vancouver saw an unprecedented real estate boom that led to the construction of dozens of condo towers in the city. Cheng has become the leading residential tower designer of this period. UBC professor Dina Krunic has commented that "concrete construction and green glass façade, for which Vancouver is internationally known, are James Cheng's legacy." In 2012 Cheng was awarded the Order of Canada.

While most of his projects are residential and in Vancouver, Cheng has other credits:

- Living Shangri-La previously the tallest building in Metro Vancouver, an upscale hotel and condominium building
- King George Tower - designed proposed tower that if completed would be one of the tallest buildings in Canada
- Fairmont Pacific Rim- an upscale hotel and condominium building
- Shangri-La Toronto - mixed used hotel, condo tower in Toronto and second building built by Cheng outside BC
- Lincoln Square in Bellevue, Washington and first building built by Cheng outside BC
- Shaw Tower - mix residential-commercial office tower
- Parc Residences in Victoria, BC - residential mid-rise
- Willow Court in Vancouver, BC - residential townhouses - In 1983, Willow Court won Cheng the Governor General's Medal for Architecture
- The Falls in Victoria, BC - residential mid-rise with retail base
- Terminal City Club Tower - mixed used hotel, condo and office tower
- Waiea Tower in Ward Village - 36-floor residential tower in Honolulu, Hawaii.
