= Rogers Tower =

Rogers Communications' Lower Mainland headquarters

Coordinates: 49°17′18″N 123°07′04″W

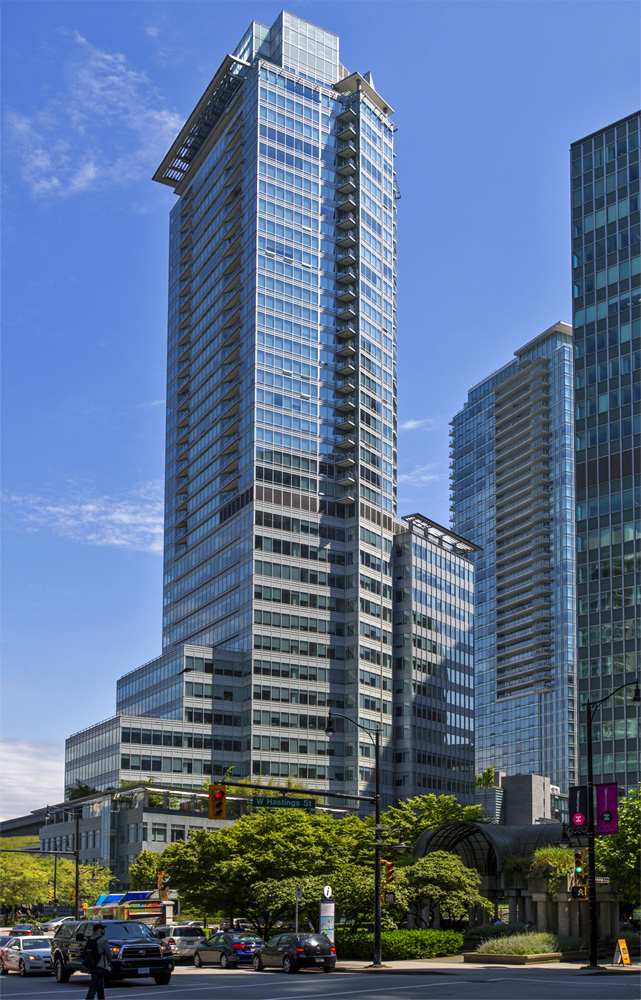
- Rogers Tower is the tallest tower in Vancouver's Coal Harbour waterfront.
- Interactive map of the Rogers Tower area

General information
- Type: offices and residential units
- Location: 1067 and 1077 West Cordova Street; Vancouver, British Columbia
- Construction started: 2002
- Completed: 2005
- Owner: Westbank Projects Corp and Rogers Communications
- Operator: Westbank Projects Corp and Rogers Communications

Height
- Antenna spire: None
- Roof: 149 m (489 ft)
- Top floor: 42

Technical details
- Floor count: 42
- Floor area: commercial 283,572 sq ft residential 211,710 sq ft
- Lifts/elevators: 3

Design and construction
- Architect: James K.M. Cheng Architects
- Developer: Westbank Projects Corp
- Structural engineer: Jones Kwong Kishi Consulting Engineers
- Main contractor: Ledcor Construction Limited, under Ledcor Group of Companies

Rogers Tower, located at 1067 West Cordova Street in the downtown core of Vancouver in Coal Harbour, in British Columbia, Canada, is home to Rogers Communications' headquarters for Lower Mainland Operations and credited to local architect James K. M. Cheng.

The building stands at 489 feet (149 m) or 41 stories and was completed in 2004. It is currently the seventh-tallest building in Vancouver. The lower 16 floors of the tower are offices while the upper 24 floors contain 130 work-live condominiums. Shaw Communications, the building's former namesake, once occupied 11 full floors. The building has two official addresses: 1067 is the building's business address, while 1077 is the residential address.

The Jim Pattison Group, one of Canada's largest conglomerates, is headquartered in the tower.

The building was rebranded from Shaw Tower to Rogers Tower in May 2023, after Shaw Communications merged into Rogers Communications.

== Accidents ==
On August 14, 2017, an accident during filming of Deadpool 2 concerning Joi "SJ" Harris occurred at Shaw Tower. Harris died at the scene.

== See also ==
- List of tallest buildings in Vancouver
