= Deadpool 2 =

2018 superhero film by David Leitch

- Theatrical release poster
- Directed by: David Leitch
- Written by: Rhett Reese; Paul Wernick; Ryan Reynolds
- Based on: Deadpool by: Fabian Nicieza; Rob Liefeld
- Produced by: Simon Kinberg; Ryan Reynolds; Lauren Shuler Donner
- Starring: Ryan Reynolds; Josh Brolin; Morena Baccarin; Julian Dennison; Zazie Beetz; T.J. Miller; Brianna Hildebrand; Jack Kesy
- Cinematography: Jonathan Sela
- Edited by: Dirk Westervelt; Craig Alpert; Elísabet Ronaldsdóttir
- Music by: Tyler Bates
- Production companies: 20th Century Fox; Marvel Entertainment; Kinberg Genre; Maximum Effort; The Donners' Company; 87North Productions
- Distributed by: 20th Century Fox
- Release dates: May 10, 2018 (Leicester Square); May 18, 2018 (United States)
- Running time: 119 minutes
- Country: United States
- Language: English
- Budget: $110 million
- Box office: $786 million

Deadpool 2 is a 2018 American superhero film based on the Marvel Comics character Deadpool. It is the sequel to Deadpool (2016) and the eleventh installment in the X-Men film series. The film was directed by David Leitch and written by Rhett Reese, Paul Wernick, and Ryan Reynolds, who stars in the title role alongside Josh Brolin, Morena Baccarin, Julian Dennison, Zazie Beetz, T.J. Miller, Brianna Hildebrand, and Jack Kesy. In the film, Deadpool forms the X-Force to protect a young mutant from the time-traveling soldier Cable.

Plans for a sequel to Deadpool began before the original film's release, and were confirmed in February 2016. Though the original creative team of Reynolds, Reese, Wernick, and director Tim Miller were set to return for the second film, Miller left the project in October 2016 due to creative differences with Reynolds and was soon replaced by Leitch. An extensive casting search took place to fill the role of Cable, with Brolin ultimately cast. Principal photography took place in British Columbia from June to October 2017.

Deadpool 2 premiered at the Empire Leicester Square in London on May 10, 2018, and was released in the United States on May 18, by 20th Century Fox. The film outgrossed its predecessor, earning $785.9 million worldwide against a $110 million production budget, becoming the ninth highest-grossing film of 2018, the highest-grossing film in the X-Men series, and the highest-grossing R-rated film at the time of its release. The film received positive reviews from critics, with some considering it superior to the first film and praising its humor, cast performances, story, and action sequences, while others criticized its tone, script, and recycled jokes. A PG-13-rated version of the film, titled Once Upon a Deadpool, was released on December 12, 2018, to mixed reviews. Following the acquisition of 21st Century Fox by Disney, Deadpool's film rights were returned to Marvel Studios. A sequel, Deadpool & Wolverine, starring Reynolds and Hugh Jackman and integrating their characters into the Marvel Cinematic Universe (MCU), was released on July 26, 2024, as part of Phase Five of the MCU.

== Plot ==
After fighting organized crime as Deadpool for two years, Wade Wilson fails to kill one of his targets on his anniversary with his girlfriend, Vanessa. That night, after the pair decides to start a family together, the target tracks Wade down and inadvertently kills Vanessa; Wade then kills him in revenge. Six weeks later, Wade is still wallowing in self-hatred. He visits Blind Al, who unsuccessfully attempts to convince him to move on with his life. After a series of suicide attempts, Wade has a vision of Vanessa in the afterlife but remains alive due to his healing abilities. Wade is left with only a Skee-Ball token as an anniversary gift, as final mementos of Vanessa.

Colossus recovers Wade's body and takes him to the X-Mansion to recruit him. Wade reluctantly agrees to join the X-Men because he believes Vanessa would have wanted him to. He, Colossus, and Negasonic Teenage Warhead respond to a standoff between authorities and the unstable young mutant Russell Collins at an orphanage owned by the Essex Corporation, labeled a "Mutant Re-education Center". Realizing that Russell has been abused by the orphanage staff, Wade kills one of the staff members before being restrained by Colossus, and both Wade and Russell are arrested. Fitted with power-suppressing collars, they are taken to the Ice Box, an isolated prison for mutant criminals. Meanwhile, Cable, a cybernetically enhanced soldier from the future, travels back in time to kill Russell.

Cable storms the Ice Box and attacks Russell. Wade, whose collar breaks in the ensuing melee, attempts to protect Russell. After Cable takes Vanessa's token, Wade forces himself and Russell out of the prison, but not before Russell overhears Wade denying that he cares for him. Near death again, Wade has another vision of Vanessa in which she convinces him to help Russell.

Deadpool organizes a team he calls X-Force to free Russell from a prison transfer convoy and protect him from Cable. The team launches its assault on the convoy by parachute, but all members die during the landing except for Wade and Domino, whose main superpower she claims to be pure luck. While a fight with Cable distracts them, Russell frees fellow inmate Juggernaut, who agrees to help him kill the abusive orphanage headmaster. Juggernaut destroys the convoy, rips Wade in half, and escapes alongside Russell.

While Wade recovers, Cable offers to work with him and Domino to stop Russell from killing the headmaster. Cable explains that in his timeline, after Russell kills the headmaster, he becomes a serial killer who killed Cable's wife and daughter. Wade accepts Cable's offer, on the condition that Cable gives him a chance to change Russell's mind. At the orphanage, however, Deadpool and team are overpowered by Juggernaut, while Russell pursues the headmaster. Colossus, having initially refused to help out, due to Wade's murderous ways, arrives to distract Juggernaut. Wade fails to placate Russell, forcing Cable to shoot at the boy. Wade leaps in front of the bullet while wearing the Ice Box collar and dies, reuniting with Vanessa in the afterlife. His sacrifice dissuades Russell from killing the headmaster and, consequently, saves Cable's family. Cable uses his last charge, reserved for his return trip to his family, to warp back several minutes, strapping Vanessa's token in front of Wade's heart so he survives the bullet. Cable then decides to stay in the present for a while to help improve the world, knowing that his family will be safe in the future. Afterward, the headmaster is run over and killed by Wade's taxi driver friend Dopinder.

Later, Negasonic and her girlfriend Yukio repair Cable's time-traveling device for Wade. He uses it to save the lives of Vanessa and X-Force member Peter, as well as to kill an alternate version of himself confronting Wolverine, baby Hitler in 1889, and Ryan Reynolds after he finishes reading the screenplay for Green Lantern.

== Cast ==
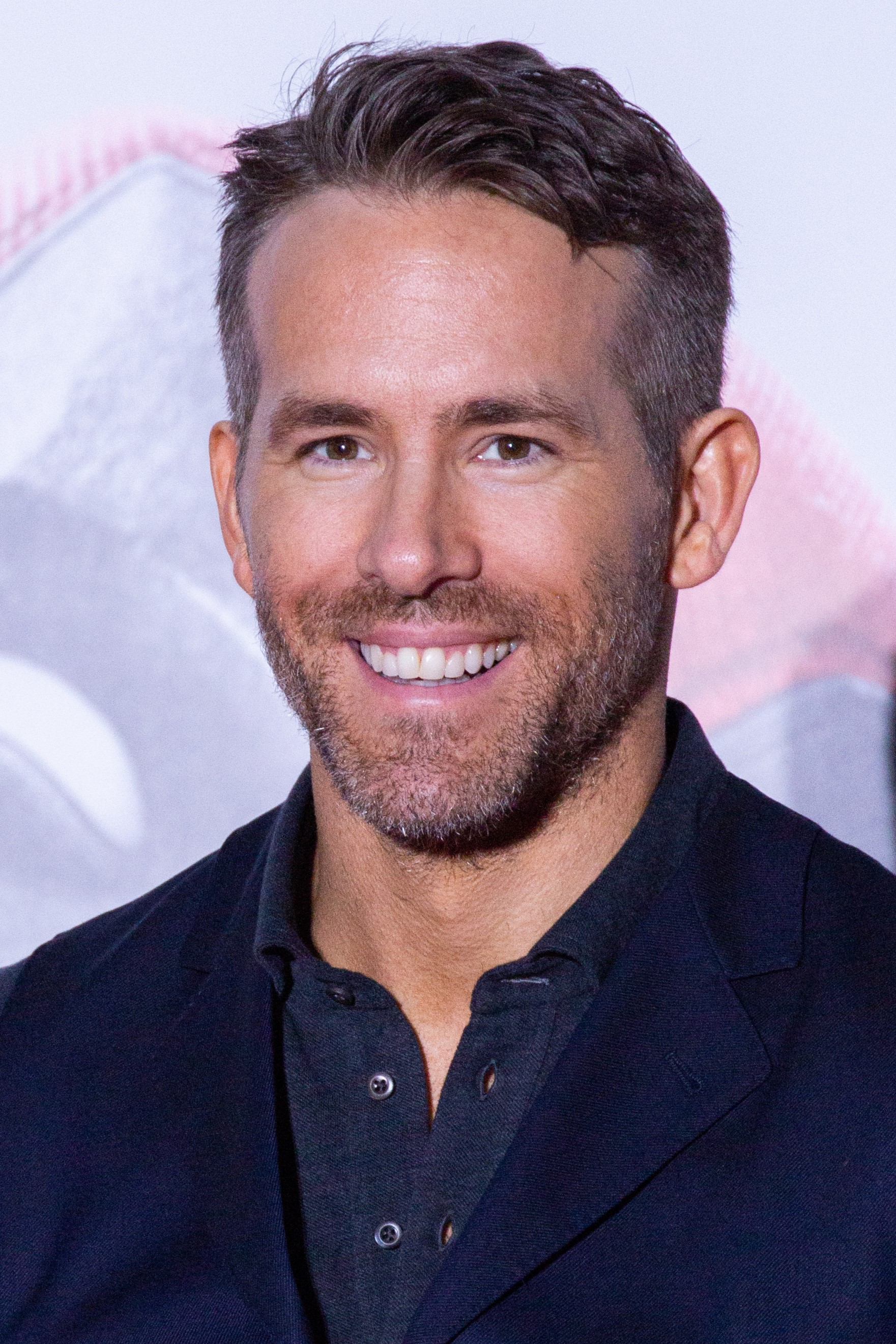
Reynolds at the Tokyo premiere of the film

- Ryan Reynolds as Wade Wilson / Deadpool:
  A wisecracking mercenary with accelerated healing but severe scarring over his body after undergoing an experimental regenerative mutation. He forms the X-Force, a team of mutants, after finding himself at his "lowest point" at the beginning of the film. As a co-writer on the film, Reynolds ad-libbed much of his dialogue throughout the production process. For the film's mid-credits sequence, archive footage of Reynolds portraying Deadpool in X-Men Origins: Wolverine (2009) is used, and Reynolds also portrays himself before he acted in the film Green Lantern (2011).
- Josh Brolin as Cable:
  A time-traveling cybernetic soldier, "in many ways the opposite of Deadpool." Director David Leitch called the dynamic between Cable and Deadpool "sort of classic buddy-cop fare", and compared them to the characters portrayed by Nick Nolte and Eddie Murphy, respectively, in 48 Hrs. (1982). Leitch added that the character as written in the script was mostly just an "action character", and he relied on Brolin to add nuance to the role and explore the character's internal pain to avoid it becoming a caricature. To train over the course of eleven weeks for the role, Brolin intended to "f—ing [sic] blow [himself] up with steroids and then just eat ice cream and watch TV," yet decided against it. He stated he "had this great midlife-crisis idea", and worked out for three hours a day, foregoing sugar. Brolin signed a four-film deal, and described his appearance here as just the introduction for the character, with "three more movies to reveal more".
- Morena Baccarin as Vanessa Carlysle:
  Wilson's fiancée. The character is killed at the beginning of the film in an example of "fridging"—the killing of a female character to forward the development of a male character. This happens to Cable's wife and daughter as motivation for his story arc as well. Leitch and the writers said they were unaware of the term "fridging" and that they were not being "consciously sexist". Earlier versions of the film simply had Vanessa breaking up with Wilson, but the writers wanted to use the opportunity to "engender great suffering for him by having his line of work be the thing that costs Vanessa her life." They were also more comfortable with the deaths due to the increased number of strong female characters in the film and because the deaths are reversed by the end of the film with time travel; screenwriter Rhett Reese stated, "Maybe that's a sexist thing. I don't know. And maybe some women will have an issue with that. I don't know. I don't think that that'll be a large concern, but it didn't even really occur to us." Baccarin said she trusted the storyline was necessary for the film and emphasized the fact that Vanessa is saved at the end of the film.
- Julian Dennison as Russell Collins / Firefist:
  A young mutant with pyrokinetic abilities who is being hunted by Cable. Reynolds insisted on casting Dennison after seeing him in Hunt for the Wilderpeople (2016), with the character "tailor-made" for him, and no other actors considered for the role. Leitch thought the character was an "interesting take on the whole angle of the villain." Dennison felt the role was particularly special because, being "chubby", he would watch superhero films and "never see anyone like me. I am excited to be that for other kids who look like me." Sala Baker plays the character at an older age, in Cable's future.
- Zazie Beetz as Domino:
  A mercenary with the mutant ability to manipulate luck who joins Deadpool's X-Force team. Leitch described the film's version of the character as Beetz' own "real fun interesting take", with the actress interpreting Domino as an only child who forms a "sibling sort of relationship" with Deadpool, with "that back-and-forth banter where she is not dealing with his." Beetz began "working out every day" when she got the role, which required her to shoot guns and use "full body" physicality, and chose not to shave her armpits to match the changing perception of the practice among the general public and to prove that it is "not something that is gross or shameful."
- T.J. Miller as Weasel:
  Wilson's best friend and the owner of a bar frequented by mercenaries.
- Brianna Hildebrand as Negasonic Teenage Warhead:
  A teenage X-Man with the mutant power to detonate atomic bursts from her body, she is now a "new level of X-Men" after being a trainee in the first film. Hildebrand felt that "it's cool that she's grown and matured and she still has so much of this essence of a punk kid" from the first film, and added that the character would have a "cooler" costume in the sequel. The filmmakers intended to have Hildebrand shave her head to indicate that her abilities burned off her hair, but she was unable to do so due to a television series commitment. The film also reveals that Negasonic is in a same-sex relationship, which is the first openly LGBTQ relationship depicted in a Marvel film. When Reynolds asked Hildebrand how she felt about the potential storyline during development, the actress—a member of the LGBTQ community herself—responded positively with the stipulation that the film not make "a big deal" about the relationship. In a statement, GLAAD President and CEO Sarah Kate Ellis praised the relationship as "a milestone in a genre that too often renders LGBTQ people invisible, and should send a message to other studios to follow this example of inclusive and smart storytelling."
- Jack Kesy as Black Tom Cassidy:
  A mutant inmate of the facility where Deadpool and Firefist are imprisoned. He was originally written as a more prominent antagonist, acting as a "devil on Firefist's shoulder", but his role was reduced when the writers decided there were too many antagonists in the story and the budget would be better spent on a character such as Juggernaut.

Additionally, Eddie Marsan stars as the Headmaster, who is the brutal headmaster of the Essex Home for Mutant Rehabilitation, an orphanage, and Shioli Kutsuna stars as Yukio, Negasonic Teenage Warhead's girlfriend and fellow X-Man. Yukio previously appeared in The Wolverine (2013), portrayed by Rila Fukushima. Randal Reeder cameos as Buck, a huge "biker-type" who hangs out at Weasel's bar, whom Deadpool only allows to have one line.

Actors reprising their roles from Deadpool include Leslie Uggams as Blind Al, Deadpool's blind elderly roommate; Karan Soni as Dopinder, Deadpool's admirer and taxi driver, serving as Deadpool's de facto chauffeur; and Stefan Kapičić as the voice of Colossus, a member of the X-Men with the mutant ability to transform his entire body into organic steel. Kapičić described Colossus as one of the most important characters in the film, requiring a more intense process for Kapičić during recording for the character. He explained that Colossus would continue to try making Deadpool a better person and potential X-Man after doing so in the first film. Unlike the first film, Kapičić also provided performance capture for the character's face on the sequel, while Andre Tricoteux returned to serve as the body-double for the character on set.

In addition to portraying Deadpool and himself, Reynolds provided the voice for the Juggernaut, which was digitally modulated to make the tone deeper. Juggernaut is credited as being voiced by "himself" and was previously portrayed by Vinnie Jones in X-Men: The Last Stand (2006). According to Reese, the creative team on Deadpool 2 felt that appearance did not do justice to the character. Wanting an additional villain for the film to support Firefist for the final fight with X-Force, the writers chose Juggernaut because he is "a force of nature [who] was probably the coolest character never to be used ... in the right way." The character's face was modeled after Leitch's, with Reynolds additionally providing facial capture. Reese added that the character "didn't have many lines, he's a man of few words, but he's a man of great anger and forcefulness."

Additionally, Robert Maillet briefly appears as Sluggo, an inmate of the Ice Box who originally had a more prominent antagonistic role alongside Black Tom before both roles were reduced due to the number of villains in the film; Dakoda Shepley has a cameo as fellow Ice Box inmate, Omega Red; Hayley Sales and Islie Hirvonen respectively appear as Cable's wife and daughter Hope, during a flashforward; and the film's version of the X-Force team also includes Terry Crews as Bedlam, Lewis Tan as Shatterstar, Bill Skarsgård as Zeitgeist, Rob Delaney as Peter Wisdom, and Brad Pitt as Vanisher. Pitt was considered for the role of Cable before scheduling issues prevented him from taking it; he filmed his Vanisher cameo in two hours during postproduction.

Reprising their roles as the X-Men for a brief cameo are James McAvoy as Professor X, Nicholas Hoult as Beast, Evan Peters as Quicksilver, Tye Sheridan as Cyclops, Alexandra Shipp as Storm, and Kodi Smit-McPhee as Nightcrawler. Archive footage of Hugh Jackman as Logan / Wolverine from X-Men Origins: Wolverine is used in the mid-credits sequence with Jackman's permission. This was re-edited for the sequence, and included raw footage shot for that film. Luke Roessler, who portrays a young David Haller in Legion, appears as a young mutant credited as "Cereal Kid". When Cable travels to the present day, he comes across two "rednecks" discussing a toilet paper manifesto. This was inspired by a real manifesto written by Reese, which the writers wanted to be discussed in the film by a certain "caliber" of actor: the characters are portrayed by Alan Tudyk and a disguised Matt Damon, with the latter credited as "Dickie Greenleaf" as a reference to his 1999 film The Talented Mr. Ripley. Leitch and writers Reese and Paul Wernick respectively cameo as Ice Box inmate "Ground Chuck Mutant", a news helicopter pilot, and a news cameraman. Stan Lee was unable to cameo in the sequel, as he did in the first film and the short No Good Deed (2017), but his likeness was used for a bust in the X-Mansion and for graffiti art on a wall.

== Production ==
=== Development ===
Producer Simon Kinberg revealed in September 2015 that discussions had begun regarding ideas for a sequel to Deadpool, which was set to be released in February 2016. One idea was for the film to introduce the character Cable, who had previously been looked at to appear in the first Deadpool and X-Men: Days of Future Past (2014) before that. Cable's inclusion in the potential sequel was confirmed by the character Deadpool while breaking the fourth wall in the post-credits scene of the first film. Domino, a character with connections to Cable in the comics, was also believed to be featured in the sequel. By the first film's release, 20th Century Fox had green-lit a sequel, with writers Rhett Reese and Paul Wernick returning to write the screenplay. Though director Tim Miller and producer/star Ryan Reynolds were not confirmed for the sequel at the time, Fox was "intent on keeping the creative team together". Miller and Reynolds' involvement was confirmed at the 2016 CinemaCon that April, though Miller had still not formally signed on to direct the sequel. He began work developing the script with the writers, while Reynolds had signed a new contract granting him "casting approval and other creative controls".

It has to tonally and stylistically be as fresh and original [as the first film]. That's a big challenge especially because they had 10 years to gestate on the first movie and we don't have that kind of time on the second movie. That's the biggest mandate [for the sequel] ... we have to resist the temptation to make it bigger.

— Producer Simon Kinberg on approaching Deadpool 2

In June 2016, Kinberg expected filming to begin at the beginning of 2017. By August, Kyle Chandler was believed to be in the running to portray Cable. After being mentioned in the post credits of the first film, Dolph Lundgren expressed interest in playing the role. He took to his social media to share concept imagery created by poster artist Justin Paul. Testing of actresses for Domino had also begun by October, with the shortlist of actresses under consideration including Lizzy Caplan, Mary Elizabeth Winstead, Sienna Miller, Sofia Boutella, Stephanie Sigman, Sylvia Hoeks, Mackenzie Davis, Ruby Rose, Eve Hewson, and Kelly Rohrbach. The producers were particularly interested in casting a black or Latina actress in the role. Aubrey Plaza auditioned for the role.

At the end of October, Miller left the film over "mutual creative differences" with Reynolds, reportedly based on several factors, including Reynolds' expanded creative control over the sequel; Miller's wish for a more stylized follow-up than the first film, versus Reynolds' focus "on the raunchy comedy style that earned the first movie its R rating"; and Miller's intention to cast Chandler as Cable, which Reynolds opposed. Fox ultimately backed Reynolds over Miller, who had made his directorial debut with the first film. Miller denied this report, while Reynolds said he could only add that "I'm sad to see him off the film. Tim's brilliant and nobody worked harder on Deadpool than he did". Miller's plans for the film included introducing the young mutant Rusty and a comic book-accurate portrayal of Cable, having Vanessa embrace her Copycat persona from the comics, and featuring a fight between Juggernaut and the Thing. The latter is a member of the Fantastic Four, and the studio had approved crossing the character over from that franchise before Miller's exit. A week after Miller's departure, Fox was looking at David Leitch, Drew Goddard, Magnus Martens and Rupert Sanders as potential replacements for the director. Leitch was the "strong frontrunner" for the role, and signed on a month later. Reynolds, a fan of Leitch's John Wick (2014), said the director "really understands those Deadpool sensibilities and where we need to take the franchise", and "can make a movie on an ultra tight minimal budget look like it was shot for 10–15 times what it cost".

=== Writing ===
The first completed draft from Wernick and Reese was expected around June 2016; multiple had been completed by January 2017. The pair felt a responsibility to explore the team X-Force, which includes Deadpool, Cable, and Domino in the comics, but to also keep the film focused on Deadpool. By the next month, the studio was still not happy with the script, with Reynolds and the writers "bunkered down ... trying to cross the finish line and create something everyone is excited to make". Goddard joined them as a consultant. Reese, Wernick, and Reynolds were credited for the script, the three having split the film's scenes between them before passing them around to be rewritten by the others. Reese felt they were able to maintain "one voice" because of their long history with the character during the development on the first film.

Deadpool 2 is set "more or less" when the first film ends and focuses on "an existential crisis and a deeply personal cause" for Deadpool. Leitch felt that retaining these personal stakes was more compelling for audiences than trying to build the film around global stakes. The writers felt that the sequel was tonally similar to the first film, but wanted to explore a different theme by focusing on a group of individuals (X-Force) and their need for family, with Reynolds explaining that "the first movie is a love story masquerading as a comic-book movie, and this one is kind of a family film masquerading as a comic-book film again". Deadpool spends around half of the film unmasked, which the writers wanted for exploring the more emotional scenes, though Reynolds was reluctant to do this because he found the make-up required to portray an unmasked Deadpool "time-consuming and really uncomfortable". An early idea was to have the film begin five years after the first and explore Deadpool being a father, but the writers quickly decided that this was "never, ever going to work" and reworked the idea to explore the character wanting to have a child but being unable to.

Earlier versions of the script included prominent roles for the characters Black Tom Cassidy and Sluggo, but they ultimately had a supporting role and a brief appearance, respectively. The villain Mr. X was also included in early drafts but was cut due to the number of villains already in the film. The mutant inmates of the Ice Box were going to be explored more by having Cable break into the prison and cause their power-dampening collars to malfunction. This was removed from the script due to it not being feasible within the film's budget. Leitch fought to include more aspects of Cable's backstory in the film after the writers chose to mostly ignore it due to it being convoluted; a painting of Cyclops which would have acknowledged that character as Cable's father was ultimately cut, but the Techno-Organic Virus that Cable is inflicted with, and his daughter Hope, are depicted. The film features contradictory connections to the various films of the franchise, which Leitch acknowledged as confusing but said that the issue had not been discussed during development since the Deadpool films are considered their own "entity" in a way, and the character of Deadpool allows them to be "flexible with the timeline, per se".

Reese and Wernick preferred to use jokes in the film that only certain members of the audience would understand, though Reynolds would not allow some to be used if he thought not enough people would enjoy them (including a reference to golfer Davis Love III). Following the announcement of the proposed acquisition of 21st Century Fox by Disney in December 2017, the film includes several Disney-related jokes including a running gag about the Disney film Frozen (2013). However, Fox did make the producers remove a joke from the film that directly acknowledged the deal, which Reynolds said "was a wise decision". Other cut jokes included many "bizarre" characters interviewing to join the X-Force, such as an idea to have Chris Evans reprise his role as the Human Torch from Tim Story's Fantastic Four films. Evans would ultimately reprise the role six years later in Deadpool & Wolverine (2024).

=== Pre-production ===
Reese and Wernick confirmed in January 2017 that Stefan Kapičić's Colossus, Brianna Hildebrand's Negasonic Teenage Warhead, and Karan Soni's Dopinder would be returning from the first film to "make at least an appearance". By the beginning of March 2017, Michael Shannon had been in the running to portray Cable, but no longer could due to a scheduling conflict. David Harbour had screen-tested for the role, and Pierce Brosnan was believed to be in negotiations for a part in the film, potentially Cable. Reynolds announced shortly after that Zazie Beetz had been cast as Domino. Shannon was in the running to portray Cable again later in the month, and was considered the frontrunner ahead of a shortlist that also included Harbour. Brad Pitt was also considered for the role, but had "moved on". Leitch soon addressed the potential casting of these actors, saying Shannon "would make an incredible Cable ... If that happens, I would be through the roof"; and on Pitt, "We had a great meeting with Brad, he was incredibly interested in the property. Things didn't work out schedule-wise [but] I think he would've made an amazing Cable". Wrestler Randy Orton auditioned for the role. Aaron Taylor-Johnson was also approached by Leitch to appear in the film, even meeting together to discuss a role, but Taylor-Johnson declined it; Leitch and Taylor-Johnson would later go on to collaborate in Leitch's Bullet Train (2022). At the end of March, Morena Baccarin confirmed her return from the first film as Vanessa and expressed interest in exploring the character's Copycat persona from the comics in the sequel. Josh Brolin emerged as a "surprise contender" to play Cable in April, ahead of Shannon and Harbour, and was officially cast in the role. Brolin also portrays the Marvel Comics character Thanos in the Marvel Cinematic Universe (MCU).

Also in April, Leslie Uggams confirmed that she would be reprising her role of Blind Al from the first film, while Fox gave the sequel a June 1, 2018, release date. Noting the release date, Leitch wanted to ensure that the film "was worthy of a summer tentpole movie, and we knew we were going to be wedged in between some big films", specifically wanting to expand the action and make the general feeling of the film "bigger" than the first one. However, he wanted the film to have the same DNA as the original "in terms of the tone, and the fun ... I love that challenge" of combining that with the increased scope. The film uses Deadpool's fourth wall-breaking to reference this release period, with Leitch calling these comments "definitely fresh and timely when they come up". In May 2017, Fox was reportedly looking to use a post-credits scene at the end of Deadpool 2 to introduce several other members of X-Force who would go on to star alongside Reynolds, Brolin, and Beetz in an X-Force film. Casting for the characters—Sunspot, Feral, and Shatterstar—would take place over the coming months, though Reese denied the accuracy of this report. Later, T.J. Miller confirmed that he would return from the first film as Weasel, and described the sequel as "even more weaselicious" than the first. He noted that Reynolds and the writers had "really put the time in on the script" to meet their own expectations for the sequel as well as those of fans. Jack Kesy also joined the cast as Black Tom Cassidy. In June, Shioli Kutsuna was cast in a key role for the film, Negasonic Teenage Warhead's girlfriend Yukio. The writers felt free to use the character in whatever way the film needed due to her having only a minor role in the comics.

=== Filming ===
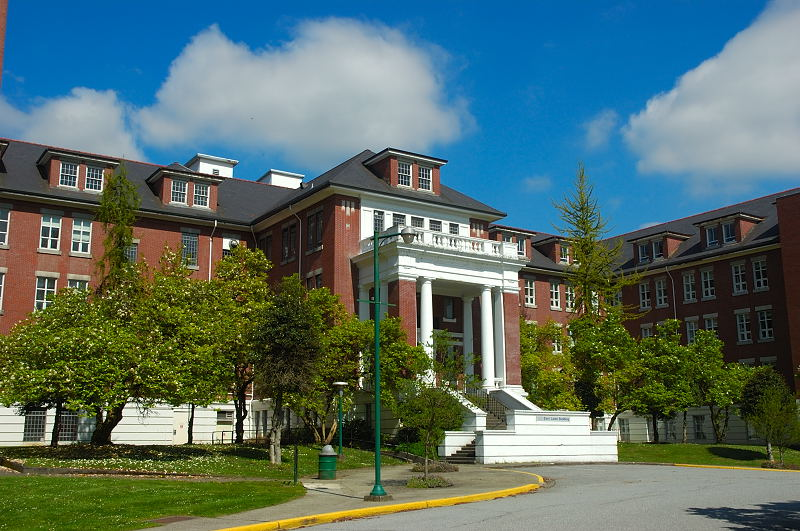
Riverview Hospital in Coquitlam served as the location for the initial and final battle scenes.

Initial filming had begun by June 17, 2017, at Hatley Castle in Victoria, British Columbia, Canada, which is used to portray the X-Mansion in the X-Men films. Principal photography began in Vancouver on June 26, under the working title Love Machine. The East Lawn building of Riverview Hospital in Coquitlam served as the location for the initial and final battle sequences. Jonathan Sela served as cinematographer for the film. At the end of June, Reynolds revealed that Julian Dennison had been cast in the film. The next month, T.J. Miller said that he found the sequel to be funnier than the first film, and that "it's not going to be the same movie in a different location [like The Hangover Part II (2011)]. It's got different stakes, different things happen, some pretty tragic, dark shit happens in the first part of the film, in the beginning, and the rest of the film is kind of dealing with that". By then, Kapičić had been working with Leitch on set, and expected to continue contributing to Colossus through to April 2018. Production on the X-Men film Dark Phoenix (2019) was taking place in Montreal concurrently with the filming of Deadpool 2, with Kinberg directing that film. He directed a brief moment where the X-Men are seen through an open door in the X-Mansion, which was added to Deadpool 2 with the aid of green screen to allow those characters to appear in this film.

Leitch worked closely with Sela, the pair having previously collaborated on Leitch's earlier films, to acknowledge the aesthetic of the first film while expanding the look of the sequel to match the new situations and characters introduced. The pair created specific shot lists and plans for blocking out scenes before they arrived on set and were very particular about the colors they used; they planned the color palette of the entire film and also produced color wheels detailing specific palettes for each set piece. These color wheels were sometimes adjusted several days into the filming of a sequence after digital intermediate work revealed a different look than Leitch and Sela had been anticipating. Elements that were carried over from the first film included the "moodiness" and saturation of scenes set in Deadpool's apartment, and the contrast with blacks in action sequences, while Cable's future had a new aesthetic unlike anything in the first film. Another example of these color wheels was the sequence in which Firefist is introduced, with Leitch taking advantage of the scene being set during the day to overemphasize the lighting and create a general sepia/orange tone that represented the fire abilities the character displays. This aesthetic met the storytelling needs of the scene as well as the practicalities of the filmmaking process. Because the film was shot digitally, Sela worked with Vantage Film to develop custom lenses that created the "texture and flavor" he wanted for it where he otherwise would have manipulated the exposure and development of film stock to achieve the same effect.

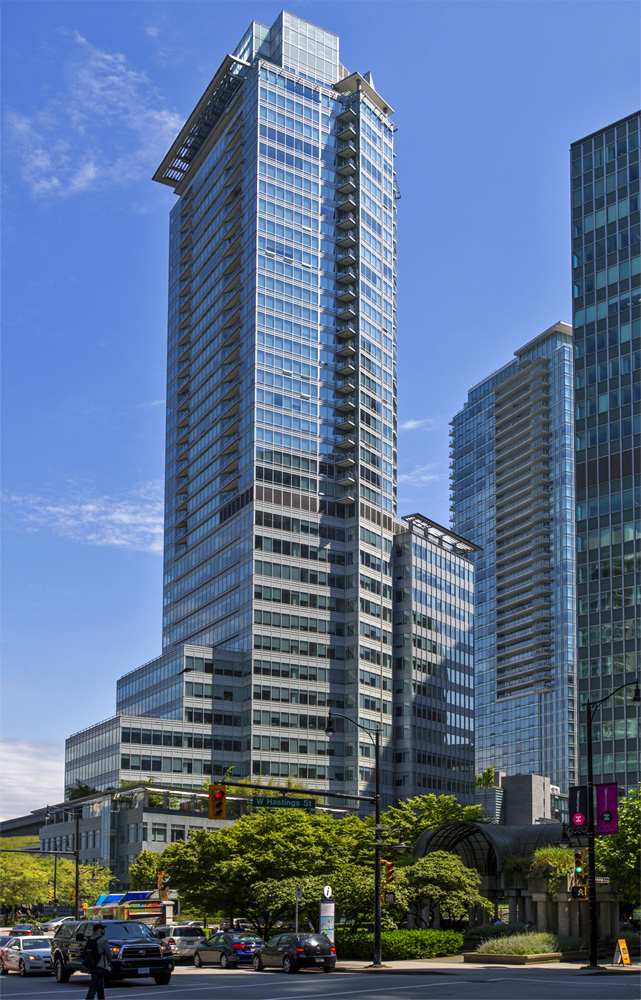
An accident during filming on location at Shaw Tower in Vancouver caused the death of stunt woman Joi "SJ" Harris.

On August 14, stunt woman Joi "SJ" Harris died in a motorcycle accident after losing control and crashing into Shaw Tower. Harris was working on the film as a stunt performer for the first time and had only joined the production a week before. Harris was not wearing a helmet because the character she was portraying, Domino, does not wear one in the scene, and there had not been time since she joined the film to create one for her to fit underneath the Domino wig. She had two full days of rehearsing the stunt as well as five more attempts on the day of the accident. Veteran stunt double Melissa Stubbs had been available and willing to do the stunt, but the inexperienced Harris was preferred due to her skin color being a match for Beetz. This decision was criticized by multiple stunt professionals, with many noting that Harris' experiences racing motorcycles did not necessarily qualify her as an able stunt performer. Production was shut down immediately after the incident but resumed two days later. With this news also came reports that the film's crew were "enduring very long hours" and were "exhausted by the schedule", with the studio confirming that some days had increased from the scheduled 12–13 hours filming to over 15 hours. The film's credits includes a dedication to the stuntwoman that reads "In memory of Sequana Harris".

Earlier in August, Reynolds revealed that Rob Delaney was at the film's set, and Eddie Marsan revealed later in the month that he was also on set for a role in the film. Filming in Vancouver was expected to last until October 6, with production on Deadpool 2 being officially completed on October 14. Discussing the film's action, having previously worked as a stunt coordinator, Leitch said that all stunts are "variations on a theme" with the same basic elements, but Deadpool allows you to "subvert those basics, and there's an expectation for a classic gag, but oops, maybe you get something else". He also felt that introducing Domino gave the film unique opportunities for action sequences taking advantage of her luck-based abilities, as well as focusing on Deadpool's healing abilities and trying to use those interestingly. Darrin Prescott served as second-unit director on the film, and Jonathan Eusebio was the stunt-coordinator for the film, both having worked on John Wick previously. Domino's abilities were envisioned as a "Rube Goldberg machine on steroids", while Deadpool allowing his arm to be broken during a fight was an example of his abilities being used. Unlike the first film, for which Fox was unwilling to pay for the writers to be on set, the studio did pay for Reese and Wernick to be on set for the sequel. Leitch was happy for this to happen, Reynolds wanted them to be there, and it allowed the pair to continue contributing to the script and suggest new jokes and ideas throughout the filming process. Scroggins Aviation Mockup & Effects was hired to supply a CH-47 Chinook (s/n 90-00204) in the film. Scroggins made modifications to the CH-47 and worked with SFX to rig it to a motion base (Gimbal). It would be the first time a real Chinook was placed on a motion base in a motion picture.

=== Post-production ===
Fox revealed in November that the film was technically untitled at that point, and not officially known as Deadpool 2 as had been assumed; the studio was temporarily referring to the film as The Untitled Deadpool Sequel. Sexual misconduct allegations against T.J. Miller surfaced a month later, and by January 2018 some commentators had called for Miller to be replaced in the film in a similar manner to how Kevin Spacey was replaced by Christopher Plummer through reshoots in All the Money in the World (2017). Producer Lauren Shuler Donner addressed whether this would be possible, saying "We're in the final editing. I don't think so". Miller was later arrested for calling in a false bomb threat; Reynolds would not comment on either issue, but stated that Miller would not be appearing in the X-Force film. Also in January, the film's release was moved up to May 18, 2018.

In February 2018, Terry Crews was revealed to have a role in the film, the character Shatterstar was confirmed to be appearing, and the production returned to Vancouver for six days of reshoots under a new working title, Daisy. Some reports emerged by mid-March claiming that these reshoots were due to poor audience responses during test screenings of the film, and consisted of sweeping changes. However, the film was soon confirmed to be testing better than the original did, up to 98 out of 100 over three different tests (compared to a maximum score of 91 during tests of the first film). Because of this, the reshoots were adding more of the elements that audiences responded positively to, including additional material featuring Cable and Domino. Sam Hargrave joined the film as a stunt coordinator for the reshoots, trying to "breathe some new life in a couple of sequences". He highlighted a car chase which combines vehicles, actors, and green screen. By the end of the month, Pitt filmed a secret cameo appearance as the X-Force team member Vanisher during two hours of filming in Los Angeles, having been asked to shoot the part by Reynolds and agreeing to be paid "scale", which Reese described as the equivalent of a Starbucks coffee. This was the final photography work done for the film. The film's first full trailer officially titled the film Deadpool 2, and revealed that Crews was portraying Bedlam; confirmed that Delaney would appear, portraying Peter; and that Bill Skarsgård also had a role. The film's final trailer, released a month later, confirmed that Lewis Tan would portray Shatterstar, joining Domino, Bedlam, and Peter as members of X-Force. The group also includes Skarsgård's character, revealed to be Zeitgeist.

One scene that was cut from the film following test screenings was a post-credits scene featuring Deadpool traveling back in time to kill a baby Adolf Hitler. It was decided that the scene made audiences too "squeamish", which was not the feeling that the creative team wanted people to be leaving the film with. The film originally did not have any post- or mid- credits scenes, with the Hitler scene and the film's other time-traveling mid-credits scenes shot during additional photography. The latter came about when someone suggested the time travel device be used to fix real-world mistakes like Reynolds' role in Green Lantern which the writers felt was "the funniest idea ever, and what a great idea to end the movie". According to Deadpool creator Rob Liefeld, there were even discussions at one point to make an after-credits scene featuring Stryfe to tease the planned X-Force film, as the multi-picture contract Brolin signed on to play Cable in the film included that, but the studio struck such plans. Additional footage of the X-Force team was shot for the film's marketing to hide the fact that the majority of the X-Force are immediately killed as a joke in the film. Due to Deadpool's mask, the creative team was able to change the character's dialogue up to the film being officially completed; Reynolds took this opportunity to keep adding new jokes to the film as long as possible.

Visual effects for the characters of Colossus and Juggernaut were provided by Framestore. The model for Colossus was altered from the first film to make him more "chiseled and angular", and his movements were based on motion capture performed by Andre Tricoteux on set. Tricoteux wore several metallic pieces, including a helmet and chest piece, as reference. Kapičić provided the character's facial performance. The character's "iconic metal ridges" were live textured by animators for the first film, but Framestore changed this to use a combination of shape movement and distortion so they could be more precise with the geometry of the lines. Juggernaut was represented on set by a 6 feet 8 inches (2.03 m) stand-in, who wore a helmet extension to match the character's 9 feet 6 inches (2.90 m) height. A full-scale replica of the character's metal helmet was built for interacting with stunts on set, but the final version was completely digital along with the rest of the character. Framestore animators found it challenging to move the helmet in a way that the character could still move his head underneath it, and studied the movement of bodybuilders for the character. Juggernaut's face was modeled on Leitch's, and Reynolds provided facial capture for the character, but this was modified during the animation process. For the final fight between the two characters, two stuntmen who matched the height difference between the two were filmed on a motion capture stage for reference; this footage was edited into a previsualization. Other VFX companies like DNEG, Method Studios and Weta Digital contributed to the film with supervision by Mike Brazelton, Stephen Naze, Sean Konrad, Dan Macarin, and Dan Glass.

== Music ==
Junkie XL chose not to return for Deadpool 2 after composing the score for the first film, given that Miller was "the driving force behind" him working on that film in the first place. In October 2017, it was confirmed that Tyler Bates would be writing the score for Deadpool 2 after doing the same for Leitch's previous films. Bates approached the music with a slight rock sensibility, and used a distorted guitar run through a wah-wah pedal, microsynths to add "unique colors", and a choir. The choir originally sings lyrics such as "you can't stop this motherfucker" and "holy shit balls!", which ultimately earned the score a parental advisory warning. It is the first score album to receive such a warning. Bates felt this was not "merit-less debauchery, it was just fun. It's very rare that we can work on something at such a high professional level that embraces the irreverence of Deadpool."

Leitch wanted to create an original song for the film that served as an emotional through-line for all of the film's characters; the song "Ashes" was ultimately produced, as recorded by Céline Dion. Leitch directed a music video to go with the release of the song, and Reynolds wanted to produce a music video to accompany the song; Leitch was initially conflicted about this, as he wanted audiences to discover the song, which was filmed in The Colosseum at Caesars Palace. It features dancer Yanis Marshall performing as Deadpool in high heels while Dion sings the song. The song was released as a single with the music video on May 3, 2018, before Sony Classical Records released a score album on May 11, and Columbia Records released an album featuring the songs from the film—including "Ashes"—on May 18.

== Marketing ==
For the Fox presentation at CineEurope 2017 in June, Reynolds made a video message featuring himself in costume as Deadpool from the film's set. The first teaser poster, which pays homage to Norman Rockwell's 1943 painting Freedom from Want, was released that November. Justin Carter of Comic Book Resources found it "oddly appropriate for Deadpool 2 to co-opt [this] iconic work for a modern pop culture audience" as it is "true to Deadpool's incredibly referential nature." Eric Diaz of Nerdist said, "It strikes exactly the irreverent tone you'd expect for the Deadpool sequel." The first footage from the film debuted the following week, at the end of a video where Reynolds (in-character as Deadpool) parodies Bob Ross and his television show The Joy of Painting. The video was described by The Hollywood Reporter's Ryan Parker as "completely out of left field" and setting the tone perfectly for the film, though his colleague Graeme McMillan was less positive due to not knowing of Ross (Deadpool co-creator Fabian Nicieza thought the fact that many in the audience would not know of Ross made the video "exactly the kind of quirky pop culture choice that works perfectly for Deadpool"). Parker added, "This trailer only showed a few seconds from the film, but fans will be talking about it all day" because of the presentation, unlike "any other trailer which would have shown so little of the product."

Rather than pay for an expensive advertisement spot during Super Bowl LII, the film's official Twitter account was used to "live tweet" the event with in-character commentary from Deadpool. A new trailer for the film was released later that week, focusing on introducing Cable. Parker felt that "Reynolds and company have completely changed the trailer game. The formula of just showing some of the actual movie, but with a tiny story thrown in is such an incredible marketing idea." McMillan and their colleague Aaron Couch praised the trailer playing on the visual effects for Cable's arm not being finished, noting it as a joke about the visual effects to remove Henry Cavill's mustache from Justice League. The group collectively praised the overall marketing for the franchise, with McMillan suggesting that the campaign for the sequel may surpass that of the first Deadpool. A full trailer for the film, explaining its general plot, was released at the end of March. Forbes contributor Scott Mendelson called it "pretty funny and mostly entertaining", but was disappointed in it being a "conventional" trailer compared to the more out-there videos previously released for the film. He explained that he thought the first film "had a winning lead character and fine character-centric jokes, but a pretty generic origin story plot that eventually became the thing it was critiquing," and was concerned that the sequel would turn out to be "a more standard 'superhero sequel' sell." Mendelson also noted the inclusion of T.J. Miller in the trailer following the reveal of sexual misconduct allegations against the actor in late 2017, calling it "inevitable no matter how tarnished his reputation might be these days." The Hollywood Reporter group also noted the more traditional style of the trailer, but remained generally positive about the film and highlighted the supporting cast for the film as appearing in the trailer, including Brolin, Beetz, Kutsuna, and Crews.

Also in March, a Twitter account was established for the character Peter and began to be regularly updated with tweets about his interests, including photos of the character beekeeping and preparing for his role in the X-Force team (as seen in the film). A month later, Fox released the final trailer for the film, with Mendelson lamenting that it was as "conventional" as the previous trailer but finding it understandable that Fox not be seen to be hiding the film, and ultimately felt that the trailer indicated the film would be "a pretty solid comic book sequel." The group at The Hollywood Reporter praised the final trailer as well, highlighting its references to X-Men Origins: Wolverine and the DC universe as well as its introduction of Peter. At the end of April, Leitch stated that alternate versions of jokes that had been cut from the film were included in the trailers, since "only one can live in the movie, so we might have snuck a couple in sort of additional materials that people can discover." As part of a promotion for the film with beverage company Mike's Harder, the Sister Margaret's School for Wayward Girls fictional bar from the film was emulated in pop-ups at the Alligator Lounge in New York from April 26 through 28, and the Slipper Clutch in Los Angeles from May 10 through 12. The pop-ups respectively served pizza and chimichangas, traditionally Deadpool's favorite food, as well as Deadpool-inspired Harder drinks. The campaign also included the chance to win a trip to the film's premiere through Harder, and the Los Angeles pop-up benefited the nonprofit DTLA Film Festival. All-in-all, the studio spent $135 million on promotions and advertisements for the film.

== Release ==
=== Theatrical ===
Deadpool 2 premiered at Leicester Square in London on May 10, 2018. It was released in the United States on May 18, 2018, having been previously scheduled for release on June 1 of that year.

=== Super Duper Cut ===
Leitch's initial cut of the film was around two hours and twelve minutes, with "nips and tucks" done to it to get the run time down to the final two hours. By May 2018, Leitch was working on an official extended edition of the film with Fox wanting to "spin that out as a special thing." He said it would be closer to his initial runtime and would include a cut montage of Deadpool trying to commit suicide in various ways, an extended sequence in the X-Mansion, and alternate versions of jokes that were not chosen for the film's theatrical version. The extended cut, known as The Super Duper Cut or The Super Duper $@%!#& Cut was screened at San Diego Comic-Con 2018 at an event titled Deadpool 2: Uncut Screening. Ahead of the screening, a panel was held at the convention moderated by Soni and featuring other cast members. Some of the scenes cut from the theatrical version of the film were debuted at the panel. The Super Duper Cut also changed and added some post-credits scenes, including Deadpool preventing Peter's death, referencing Wolverine's death in Logan, and extending the "Baby Hitler" post-credits scene from the theatrical release.

The Super Duper Cut received mixed reviews from critics, who said that the extended version did not add sufficient new material to the film, and that viewers were likely to retain their same opinions from the film's theatrical release. Mike Sorrentino from CNET noted that many of the new jokes in the extended cut were not as good as the original material, and that one of his favorite jokes was edited out.

=== Once Upon a Deadpool ===
At the end of September 2018, Fox announced that it would release an untitled Deadpool film in theaters on December 21 in place of Alita: Battle Angel, which was moved to February 2019. The studio suggested that press and fans "guess away" as to what this new film would be, but it was believed to be a re-cut version of Deadpool 2 that would carry a PG-13 rating rather than being R-rated like the initial theatrical release. Reynolds hinted that the version of the film would feature Deadpool telling the story of the film to Fred Savage, parodying The Princess Bride (1987) (also a 20th Century Fox film) in which a young Savage was told a bedtime story by Peter Falk who avoided "the scary parts that were a bit too adult for the youngster." Reese and Wernick revealed in October that the idea for the new version of the film was raised by Reynolds during a general discussion about the character following the film's initial release, and that Reynolds also suggested the framing device for the story. Reese and Wernick wrote new scenes for the new version, and Leitch returned to direct them during a single day in August. Wernick said the version would not just be for children who were unable to watch the R-rated release, as "it's subversive enough and fun and creative and something that only Deadpool could do. So I think it's going to be a real joy for not only a whole new audience, but also an audience that has seen and loved the Deadpool movies." They added that the film's story would not change "appreciably" between versions. The majority of the version is the same as the theatrical release, but edited to "meet PG-13 thresholds of violence and language." Despite the edits, the British Board of Film Classification rated Once Upon a Deadpool with a 15 certificate, the same as had been given to the original release of Deadpool 2.

Fox officially announced Once Upon a Deadpool in November, and changed the release schedule to run from December 12 to 24. The studio considered the release to be a chance of a "Christmas bonus", and it also had the potential to be released in China unlike the R-rated version. After spending the entire development process of both Deadpool and Deadpool 2 insisting to Fox that the films must be R-rated, Reynolds only agreed to support a PG-13 version of the film if a portion of the release's profit went to charity; Fox agreed to donate $1 for every ticket purchased for the film to the Fuck Cancer charity campaign, which would be temporarily renamed "Fudge Cancer" for the fundraising tie-in. At the end of November, writer and artist Michael Vincent Bramley noted that he had pitched the exact framing device that was being used for this version of the film to Reynolds on Twitter in December 2017. Within a day, Bramley had been contacted by Reynolds to discuss the issue and said, "It seems like this may all just have been a big, insane coincidence and I'm happy to leave it at that."

=== Home media ===
Deadpool 2 was released digitally on August 7, 2018, and physically on August 21. The latter release covered the Ultra HD Blu-ray, Blu-ray, and DVD formats, including both the theatrical version and Super Duper $@%!#& Cut unrated extended edition. The physical release includes an audio commentary for the theatrical version in 4K and Blu-ray formats, from Reynolds, Leitch, Reese, and Wernick. The Blu-ray format also includes a gag reel, deleted and extended scenes, alternate takes, featurettes on Easter eggs, the cast and characters, Leitch's directing, and the action and stunts, and more. Once Upon a Deadpool was released on digital and on a Blu-ray/DVD combo pack, but was not given a standalone DVD release, on January 15, 2019, with Fox giving $1 for every purchase or digital rental of Once Upon a Deadpool between January 1 and 28 to Fuck Cancer. The film became available to stream on Disney+ on July 22, 2022, alongside Deadpool and Logan.

== Reception ==
=== Box office ===
Deadpool 2 grossed $324.6 million in the United States and Canada, and $461.3 million in other territories, for a worldwide total of $785.9 million, against a production budget of $110 million. Deadline Hollywood calculated the net profit of the film to be $235.4 million, when factoring together all expenses and revenues, making it the seventh most profitable release of 2018.

On April 20, 2018, both Fandango and Regal Cinemas announced that Deadpool 2 was the best pre-selling R-rated film in their respective histories. The film opened in 4,332 theaters, setting the record for widest R-rated release ever (beating the 4,103 count by It in September 2017). It made $18.6 million from Thursday night previews and $53.3 million on its first day, setting records for both by an R-rated film, surpassing It's $13.5 million and $50.4 million, respectively. Additionally, Deadpool 2 had the highest opening day for a 20th Century Fox film, beating Star Wars: Episode III – Revenge of the Sith. It sold a total of 5.8 million tickets on its first day of release, making it the second-highest number of opening day tickets being sold for any R-rated film, after The Matrix Reloaded, which sold 6.2 million tickets during its first day. The film went on to debut to $125.5 million, the second-best opening for an R-rated film behind the original, and became the first film to dethrone Avengers: Infinity War atop the box office. It fell 65.4% in its second weekend, grossing $43.5 million and finishing second behind newcomer Solo: A Star Wars Story. The film made $23.2 million in its third weekend, remaining in second behind Solo. It dropped 39% in both its fourth and fifth weekends, making a respective $14.1 million and $8.7 million.

Worldwide, the film had a global debut of $300.4 million, including $174.9 million internationally, the largest-ever for an R-rated film or Fox release. It opened in 81 markets and finished first in all of them, including the United Kingdom ($18 million), Korea ($17 million), Russia ($11.8 million) and Australia ($11.7 million). It remained number one in 27 markets in its second weekend, making $57 million and bringing its foreign total through its first full week to $279.7 million. In its third week of international release the film made $47 million, including a $5.5 million debut in Japan (26% better than the first film), bringing its foreign total to $344 million. In China, where the PG-13 Once Upon a Deadpool version was released, it had earned $42 million, as of February 7, 2019.

Deadpool 2 superseded its predecessor to become the highest-grossing R-rated film of all time, until Joker, with a global gross of over $1 billion, surpassed it in 2019, but was surpassed in 2024 with Deadpool & Wolverine, which grossed $1.34 billion worldwide.

=== Critical response ===
On review aggregator Rotten Tomatoes, the film holds an approval rating of 83% based on 417 reviews, with an average rating of 7.1/10. The website's critical consensus reads, "Though it threatens to buckle under the weight of its meta gags, Deadpool 2 is a gory, gleeful lampoon of the superhero genre buoyed by Ryan Reynolds' undeniable charm." On Metacritic, which assigns a normalized rating to reviews, the film has a weighted average score of 66 out of 100, based on reviews from 51 critics, indicating "generally favorable reviews". Audiences polled by CinemaScore gave the film an average grade of "A" on an A+ to F scale, the same score as the first film; audiences were 59% male and 41% female.

Richard Roeper of the Chicago Sun-Times gave the film 3.5 out of 4 stars, jokingly calling it the best sequel since The Godfather Part II and saying: "Deadpool 2 is wicked, dark fun from start to finish, with some twisted and very funny special effects, cool production elements [and] terrific ensemble work." Mike McGranaghan of The Aisle Seat gave it a score of 3.5 out of 4, explaining that "Deadpool 2 is a better superhero sequel than Superman IV: The Quest for Peace, Ghost Rider: Spirit of Vengeance, and Batman & Robin. It's also better than the original Deadpool." PopMatters writer J.R. Kinnard wrote: "If you enjoyed the guilty pleasures of Deadpool, it's an immutable law of physics that you will love Deadpool 2. The second verse may be the same as the first, but that verse is a dirty limerick of childish goodness." Michael Phillips of the Chicago Tribune gave the film 3 out of 4 stars and wrote, "Deadpool 2 is just like Deadpool only more so. It's actually a fair bit better—funnier, more inventive than the 2016 smash...and more consistent in its chosen tone and style: ultraviolent screwball comedy."

A.O. Scott of The New York Times was critical of the cynical tone of the film, writing "something ever so slightly dishonest about this character, something false about the boundaries drawn around his sadism and his rage. Deadpool 2 dabbles in ugliness and transgression, but takes no real creative risks." New York writer David Edelstein wrote that the film was tedious and predictable, noting "A superhero movie with the looseness of a Mad magazine parody remains a viable idea, as demonstrated by the underrated Mystery Men and, of course, Deadpool. But a film that spits one-liners as mechanically as a tennis-ball launcher is even more tediously predictable than one with no sense of humor at all."

==== Critical response to Once Upon a Deadpool ====
Once Upon a Deadpool received mixed reviews from critics. On review aggregation website Rotten Tomatoes, this version of the film has an approval rating of 57% based on 60 reviews, with an average rating of 6/10. The website's critical consensus reads, "Once Upon a Deadpool retains enough of the franchise's anarchic spirit to entertain, but doesn't add enough to Deadpool 2 to justify its own existence." On Metacritic, the film has a weighted average score of 53 out of 100, based on 14 critics, indicating "mixed or average reviews". PostTrak reported filmgoers gave it a 77% overall positive score and a 53% "definite recommend"."

=== Accolades ===
Award	Year	Category	Recipient(s)	Result	Ref.
American Cinema Editors	2019	Best Edited Feature Film – Comedy	Craig Alpert, Elísabet Ronaldsdóttir, Dirk Westervelt	Nominated	
Artios Awards	2019	Feature (Big Budget, Comedy)	Mary Vernieu, Marisol Roncali, Corinne Clark, Jennifer Page, Yumi Takada, Nina Henninger, and Raylin Sabo	Nominated	
Critics' Choice Movie Awards	2019	Best Actor in a Comedy	Ryan Reynolds	Nominated	
Critics' Choice Movie Awards	2019	Best Comedy	Deadpool 2	Nominated	
Critics' Choice Movie Awards	2019	Best Action Movie	Deadpool 2	Nominated	
Dragon Awards	2018	Best Science Fiction or Fantasy Movie	Deadpool 2	Nominated	
GLAAD Media Award	2019	Outstanding Film – Wide Release	Deadpool 2	Nominated	
Golden Trailer Awards	2018	Best Summer Blockbuster Trailer	"Comeback"	Nominated	
Golden Trailer Awards	2018	Best Teaser	"Cable Red"	Won	
Golden Trailer Awards	2018	Most Original Trailer	"Paintings – Bob Ross Trailer"	Won	
Golden Trailer Awards	2018	Best Action TV Spot (for a Feature Film)	"Save Me / Tea"	Nominated	
Golden Trailer Awards	2018	Best Summer Blockbuster TV Spot (for a Feature Film)	"Save Me / Tea"	Nominated	
Golden Trailer Awards	2018	Best Summer Blockbuster TV Spot (for a Feature Film)	"Selfless"	Nominated	
Golden Trailer Awards	2019	Best Action	"Friends"	Nominated	
Golden Trailer Awards	2019	Best Home Ent Comedy	"Never Imagined :30"	Nominated	
Golden Trailer Awards	2019	Best Home Ent Comedy	"Baby Legs"	Nominated	
Golden Trailer Awards	2019	Best Comedy TV Spot (for a Feature Film)	"Friends"	Won	
Golden Trailer Awards	2019	Best Graphics in a TV Spot (for a Feature Film)	"Kittens/DMV"	Nominated	
Golden Trailer Awards	2019	Most Original TV Spot (for a Feature Film)	"Friends"	Won	
Golden Trailer Awards	2019	Most Original TV Spot (for a Feature Film)	"Baby Legs"	Nominated	
Golden Trailer Awards	2019	Best Motion Poster	"Piccadilly Lights"	Nominated	
Golden Trailer Awards	2019	Most Innovative Advertising for a Feature Film	"Ashes"	Nominated	
Grammy Award	2019	Best Compilation Soundtrack for Visual Media	Deadpool 2	Nominated	
Hollywood Music in Media Awards	2018	Outstanding Music Supervision – Film	John Houlihan	Nominated	
Hollywood Music in Media Awards	2018	Best Original Score – Sci-Fi/Fantasy/Horror Film	Tyler Bates	Nominated	
Hollywood Music in Media Awards	2018	Best Soundtrack Album	Deadpool 2	Nominated	
Hollywood Music in Media Awards	2018	Best Original Song – Sci-Fi/Fantasy/Horror Film	Deadpool 2 for "Ashes"	Nominated	
Houston Film Critics Society Awards	2019	Best Original Song	Deadpool 2 for "Ashes"	Nominated	
Hollywood Critics Association Awards	2018	Best Blockbuster	Deadpool 2	Nominated	
Hollywood Critics Association Awards	2018	Best Action Film	Deadpool 2	Nominated	
Hollywood Critics Association Awards	2018	Best Stunt Work	Deadpool 2	Nominated	
Motion Picture Sound Editors Awards	2019	Outstanding Achievement in Sound Editing – Sound Effects and Foley for Feature Film	Deadpool 2	Nominated	
People's Choice Awards	2018	Favorite Action Movie	Deadpool 2	Nominated	
People's Choice Awards	2018	Favorite Action Movie Star	Ryan Reynolds	Nominated	
San Diego Film Critics Society	2018	Best Comedic Performance	Ryan Reynolds	Nominated	
St. Louis Film Critics Association	2018	Best Comedy Film	Deadpool 2	Nominated	
Teen Choice Awards	2018	Choice Summer Movie Star: Male	Julian Dennison	Nominated	
Teen Choice Awards	2018	Choice Summer Movie Star: Male	Ryan Reynolds	Nominated	
Teen Choice Awards	2018	Choice Summer Movie Star: Female	Zazie Beetz	Nominated	

== Franchise ==
=== Canceled Fox sequel and spin-off ===
By November 2016, with development underway on Deadpool 2, Fox was also planning Deadpool 3, which was said to include the X-Force team. With the confirmation that Leitch would direct Deadpool 2, Fox was looking for a separate filmmaker to direct Deadpool 3. In March 2017, Reese clarified that though Deadpool 2 sets up the X-Force team, a future film focused on the team would be separate from Deadpool 3: "[X-Force] is where we're launching something bigger, but then [Deadpool 3 is] where we're contracting and staying personal and small."

In May 2018, Reynolds stated that a third Deadpool film might not be made, given the franchise's shift of focus to X-Force, though Reese and Wernick felt a third film would "absolutely" be happening after Reynolds took a break from the character and X-Force was released, which they compared to the Iron Man franchise releasing Iron Man 3 (2013) after the crossover film The Avengers (2012). Also, Leitch expressed interest in returning to the franchise. In January 2021, Reynolds revealed that the plot of the film would have involved Deadpool and Wolverine going on a road trip, in the style of the film Rashomon.

After the acquisition of 21st Century Fox by The Walt Disney Company in 2019, all planned X-Men films in development were cancelled, including X-Force and Fox's Deadpool 3, with Marvel Studios taking control of the franchise.

=== Marvel Cinematic Universe ===
Disney CEO Bob Iger said that Deadpool would be integrated with the Marvel Cinematic Universe (MCU) under Disney, and the character's films could remain R-rated "as long as we let the audiences know what's coming." The Once Upon a Deadpool version of the film was being watched carefully by Disney and Marvel Studios to see whether it might inform how they could approach the character and integrate him into the PG-13 MCU. In December 2019, Reynolds confirmed that a third Deadpool film was in development at Marvel Studios.

Shawn Levy directs, after previously working with Reynolds on Free Guy and The Adam Project, with Reese and Wernick returning to write the screenplay, along with Zeb Wells, Reynolds, and Levy also co-writing. Reynolds and Levy also produced through Maximum Effort and 21 Laps Entertainment respectively. Hugh Jackman appears as Wolverine, reprising his role from the X-Men film series. Karan Soni, Leslie Uggams, Morena Baccarin, Stefan Kapičić, Rob Delaney, Brianna Hildebrand and Shioli Kutsuna reprise their respective roles as Dopinder, Blind Al, Vanessa, the voice of Colossus, Peter, Negasonic Teenage Warhead, and Yukio from the previous Deadpool films. Emma Corrin appears as Cassandra Nova, while Matthew Macfadyen appears as Paradox. It was released on July 26, 2024, as the fourth film of the MCU's Phase Five.
