= The Green Pastures (Hallmark Hall of Fame) =

- Hallmark Hall of Fame episode
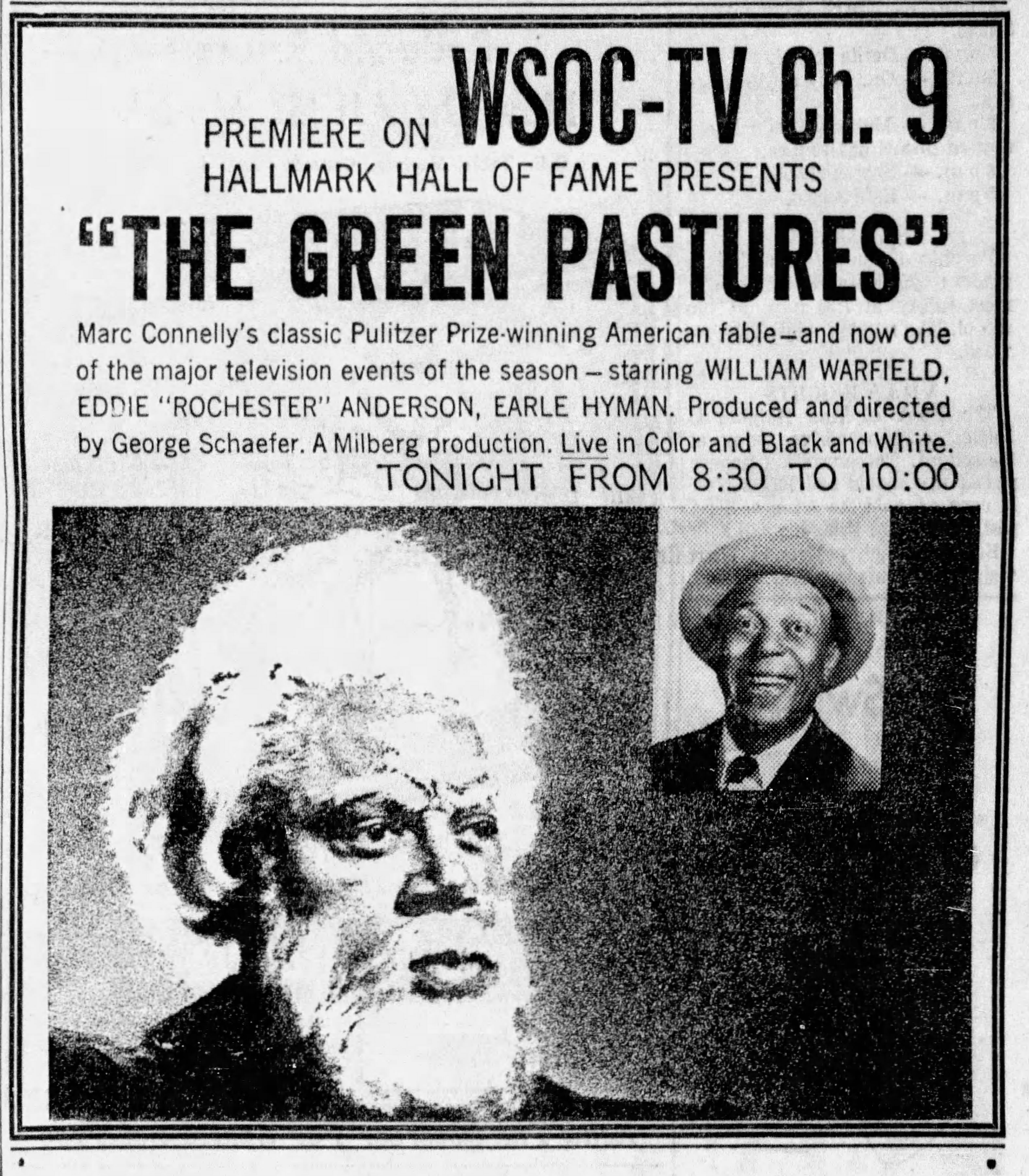
- Advertisement for "The Green Pastures"
- Episode no.: Season 7 Episode 1
- Directed by: George Schaefer
- Written by: Marc Connelly (playwright), Roark Bradford (underlying book)
- Original air date: October 17, 1957
- Running time: 1:28:48

Guest appearances
- William Warfield as The Lord; Eddie Anderson as Noah; Earle Hyman as Adam and Hezdrel

Episode chronology
| ← Previous "The Yeoman of the Guard" | Next → "On Borrowed Time" |

"The Green Pastures" was an American television play first broadcast on NBC on October 17, 1957, as part of the television series Hallmark Hall of Fame. It was adapted from Marc Connelly's 1930 Pulitzer Prize–winning play which was in turn adapted from Roark Bradford's Ol' Man Adam an' His Chillun (1928). It was one of five programs nominated as Best Program of the Year at the 10th Primetime Emmy Awards.

The African-American cast was led by William Warfield, Eddie "Rochester" Anderson, and Earle Hyman. George Schaefer was the producer and director.

== Plot ==
The program depicts fables of the troubles of the Christian God (who is called The Lord) in caring for his people on Earth. It consists of musical and comic vignettes connected by an elderly Sunday school teacher telling Bible stories to her young students.

== Cast ==
The cast included:

- William Warfield as The Lord
- Jonelle Allen as Myrtle
- Eddie "Rochester" Anderson as Noah
- Terry Carter as Gabriel
- William Dillard as King of Babylon
- Helen Dowdy as Stout Angel
- Sheila Guyse as Zeba
- Estelle Hemsley as Mrs. Deshee
- Earle Hyman as Adam and Hezdrel
- Dots Johnson as Corporal
- Rosetta LeNoire as Noah's wife
- Avon Long as First Gambler
- John Marriott as Isaac
- Mantan Moreland as Head Magician
- Frederick O'Neal as Moses
- Muriel Rahn as Zipporah
- Richard Ward as Pharaoh

The production also included music by the De Paur Chorus.

== Production ==
The 90-minute production was broadcast in color by NBC on October 17, 1957. George Schaefer was the producer and director with Mildred Freed Alberg as executive producer. Marc Connelly adapted his 1930 Pulitzer Prize-winning play, The Green Pastures, for television.

The program had the misfortune of airing at the same time as Playhouse 90's special presentation of Mike Todd's Around the World in Ninety Minutes, broadcast live from Madison Square Gardens. The Green Pastures received a Trendex rating of 12.5, far below the 34.5 rating for the Mike Todd special.

The program was re-staged with most of the same cast on March 23, 1959.

== Reception ==
In The New York Times, Jack Gould called it "one of the most glorious evenings" in television history. He praised William Warfield's portrayal of The Lord as "a magnificent achievement" as well as Eddie Anderson's "hilarious and warm" performance as Noah.

In the San Francisco Examiner, Dwight Newton called it "elegant", "inspired", "a triumph", "important, exciting television", "television at its dramatic best", a "television classic", and "a triumph" for George Schaefer. He wrote that it "literally sang with glory and majesty and good humor and earthy humor".

In the New York Daily News, Ben Gross called it "a complete delight" that "abounds in warmth and is filled with the tenderness of innocent laughter", "mingled with the moving pathos of simple faith." Gross wrote that the production left him "tingling all over."

Jack O'Brian of the International News Service called it "an entirely beautiful television play", "thoroughly enchanting in story and performance".

=== Racial controversy ===
After the original play debuted in 1930, many African-American writers and intellectuals were highly critical of its stereotypical and primitive depiction of its African-American characters, their manner of speech, and their supposedly bucolic and serene life in the Southern United States.

For the television production, Connelly modified the script to omit much of the stereotypical dialogue, even renaming the main character "The Lord" instead of "De Lawd" or "Liver Lips". The modifications were received with backlash in the white Southern press. The Montgomery Advertiser, a white newspaper in Montgomery, Alabama, called the television version "an utter flop", complaining that the characters from the original play had been "divested of their Negro traits and manners of speech", and charging that the producers "had bowed to the inverted prejudice which insists that Negroes shall never be portrayed as Negroes".
