= Eloise C. Uggams =

American singer (1896–1972)

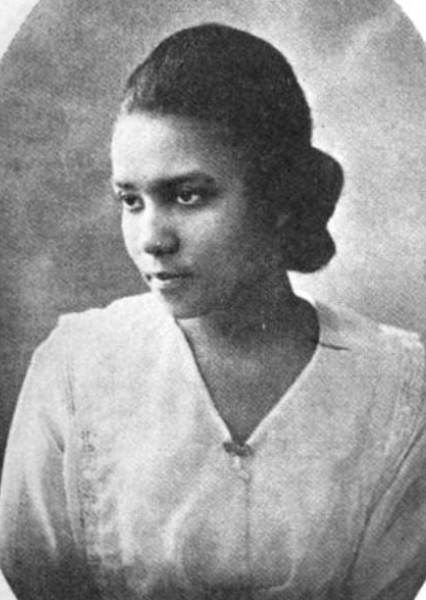
- Eloise C. Uggams, from a 1918 publication
- Born: December 20, 1896; Florida or South Carolina, US
- Died: July 14, 1972 (aged 75); New York, US
- Occupation: Singer
- Known for: Member of Fisk Jubilee Singers, Broadway appearances
- Relatives: Leslie Uggams (niece)

Eloise Colcolough Uggams (December 20, 1896 – July 14, 1972) was an American soprano singer. She was a member of the Fisk Jubilee Singers, and appeared in Broadway musicals.

== Early life ==
Uggams was born in Florida or South Carolina (sources vary on the location), the daughter of Coyden Harold Uggams and Mamie Hughes Uggams. Her father was a Presbyterian minister. She attended Fisk University. She gave her senior recital in 1919.

== Career ==
Uggams sang and toured with the Fisk Jubilee Quartet with Henrietta Myers in 1918 and 1919. Broadway appearances by Uggams included roles in Lew Leslie's Blackbirds of 1928 (1928-1929, 1934), and Rhapsody in Black (1931), The Pirate (1942-1943), Run, Little Chillun (1943), and Porgy and Bess (1943, 1944, and 1953). She was also in the European touring company of Porgy and Bess, with Leontyne Price, William Warfield, Cab Calloway, and a young Maya Angelou. She made recordings of spirituals with Elkins-Payne Jubilee Singers in 1924, and with the Everyman Opera of New York in 1953.

Uggams was also a dressmaker, and worked for Oleg Cassini, including on the wedding gown worn by actress Gene Tierney in 1941. During World War II, she toured in the United States with the USO, and after the war, she toured as a soloist with the Eva Jessye Choir.

== Personal life ==
Uggams helped her niece, actress and singer Leslie Uggams, attend Professional Children's School in New York. "We never would have been able to afford the school if it weren't for Aunt Eloise," recalled the younger Uggams. Eloise Uggams died in 1972, aged 75 years, in New York.
