= Charles Holland (singer) =

American singer and actor (1909–1987)

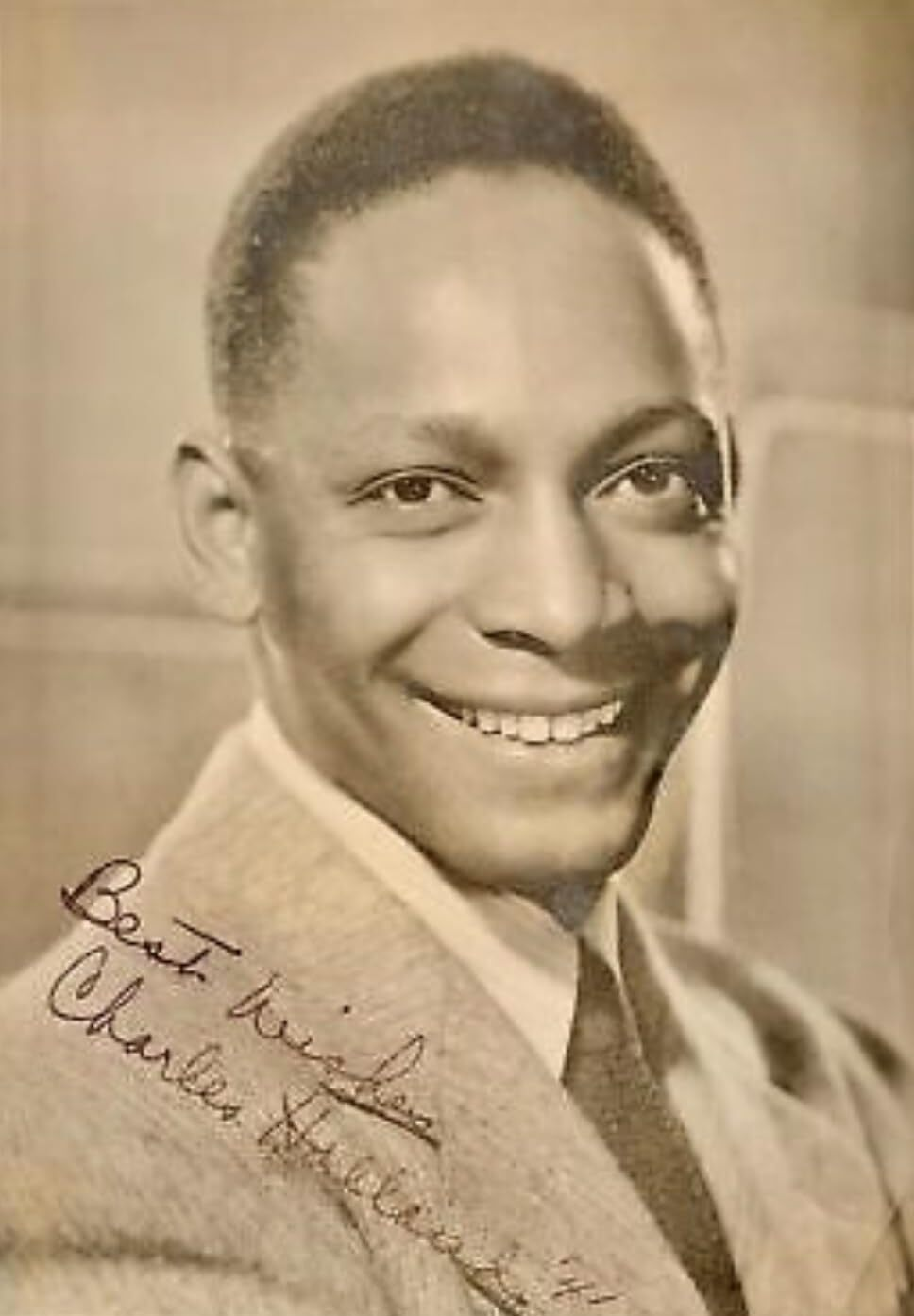
- Charles Holland (c. 1941)
- Born: December 27, 1909; Norfolk, Virginia, US
- Died: November 7, 1987 (aged 77); Amsterdam, Netherlands
- Occupations: singer, actor
- Years active: 1930s–1987
- Style: jazz, classic
- Spouse: Catherine Holland (née Cunningham)
- Children: 2
- Relatives: Peanuts Holland (brother)

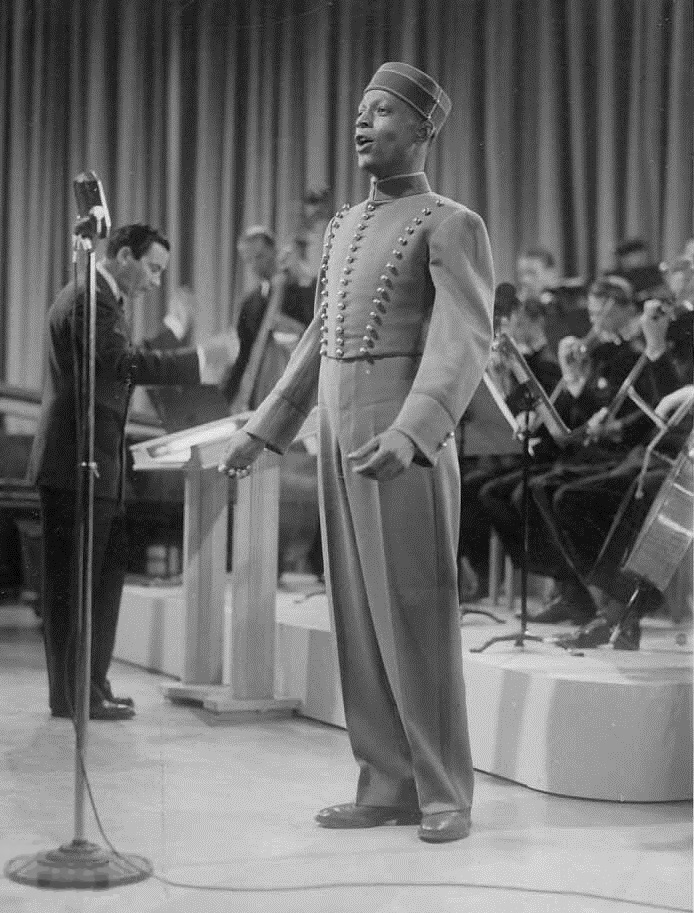
Holland as a singing bellhop in Hullabaloo (1940)

Charles Holland (December 27, 1909 – November 7, 1987) was an American tenor singer and actor.

== Early life and work ==
Charles Holland was born in Norfolk, Virginia, on December 27, 1909. The elder brother of jazz trumpeter Peanuts Holland, he started taking singing lessons at the age of 14. In the 1930s he sang in the jazz orchestras of Benny Carter and Fletcher Henderson. With the latter, he recorded the 1934 album Harlem Madness (Victor 21699). He also performed in musical theaters, toured with the Hall Johnson Choir, and had his own radio show on NBC for 13 weeks.

Holland moved to Los Angeles, where he studied with May Hamaker Henley and Georges Le Pyre, and with Clyde Burrows in New York. In the following years he had roles in Marc Connelly's drama The Green Pastures (1936, uncredited, possibly as soloist in the Hall Johnson Choir) and in the film Hullabaloo (1940). Eventually Holland shifted musically to classical music, appearing in Virgil Thomson's Four Saints in Three Acts (1928); Hall Johnson's Run, Little Chillun (1933); and Marc Blitzstein's The Airborne Symphony (1946). On the occasion of his recital debut at the Town Hall in New York City in 1940, Ross Parmenter praised him in The New York Times; "a refined and delicate artist with a light voice which was sweet and true".

== Career outside of the United States ==
As Holland's opportunities to succeed as an African American in the field of classical music were limited, he moved to Europe in 1949 and—after a short stay in Sweden—settled in Paris. He made his debut as Monostatos in Mozart's The Magic Flute at the Palais Garnier in 1954 and appeared in the role of Nadir in Bizet's Les pêcheurs de perles at the Salle Favart in 1955. He also sang on French radio and television, appeared in the title role of Verdi's Otello in London, and made guest appearances in opera roles and song recitals in Europe, Australia, New Zealand and Canada. In 1959, Holland worked in the Netherlands for the first time. His roles included Alvaro in Verdi's La forza del destino, the title role in Gounod's Faust and Radamès in Verdi's Aida.

== Return to United States ==
Holland's comeback to the American music scene became possible when he met Dennis Russell Davies in 1975. He then toured with Davies for several years from 1977 and recorded with his orchestra. Massenet's aria "O Souverain" (from Le Cid), which he performed at a concert in California in 1977, inspired Laurie Anderson to write her song "O Superman". In 1981 he had a successful concert appearance in New York City, and made his Carnegie Hall debut in 1982. In 1983 he recorded an album of spirituals, My Lord What a Mornin', with Davies on the piano. In the following year he toured again in New York, receiving a positive review from the New York Times critic Will Crutchfield, who said: "he sang from a full heart and with a conviction that need not give place to anyone," adding that "his voice failed him at times; his spirit never."

== Personal life and family ==
Charles Holland was married to Catherine and they had two sons, Charles and Mark. Holland died on November 7, 1987, in Amsterdam.

== Discography ==
- 1948: Various artists; Four Saints in Three Acts (RCA Victor DM-1244)
- 1952: Charles Holland, W. A. Mozart, Orchestre de la Société des Concerts du Conservatoire (Pathé DT 1008)
- 1971: Various artists; Waarheen, waarvoor (Imperial 5C 052-24364)
- 1980: Various artists; Waarheen, waarvoor (Music for Pleasure 1A022-58016)
- 1982: Charles Holland, Dennis Russell Davies; My Lord, What a Mornin' (1750 Arch Records)
- 1988: Charles Holland, Dennis Russell Davies; L'Invitation au Voyage (Aperto)
- 1988: Marco Bakker, Charles Holland, Patricia Madden, Robert Holl; Hoogtepunten uit: Les pêcheurs de perles / De parelvissers (EMI, 5C 053-24595)

=== Singles & EPs ===
- 1934: Fletcher Henderson and His Orchestra; Charles Holland (vocal); Harlem Madness / Phantom Fantasie (His Master's Voice B.6515)
- 1941: Charles Holland, Ralph Linsley; Honor! Honor! / Talk About a Child That Do Love Jesus (RCA Victor Red Seal)
- 1954: Charles Holland, Jacqueline Bonneau; Cinq negro spirituals exaltant l'arrivée de Notre Seigneur Jésus-Christ sur la Terre (Pathé 45 ED 28)
- 1954: Charles Holland, Jacqueline Bonneau; Negro-Spirituals (Pathé 45 ED 29)
- 1970: Marco Bakker, Charles Holland; I Believe (EMI)
