= Altonell Hines =

African-American mezzo-soprano

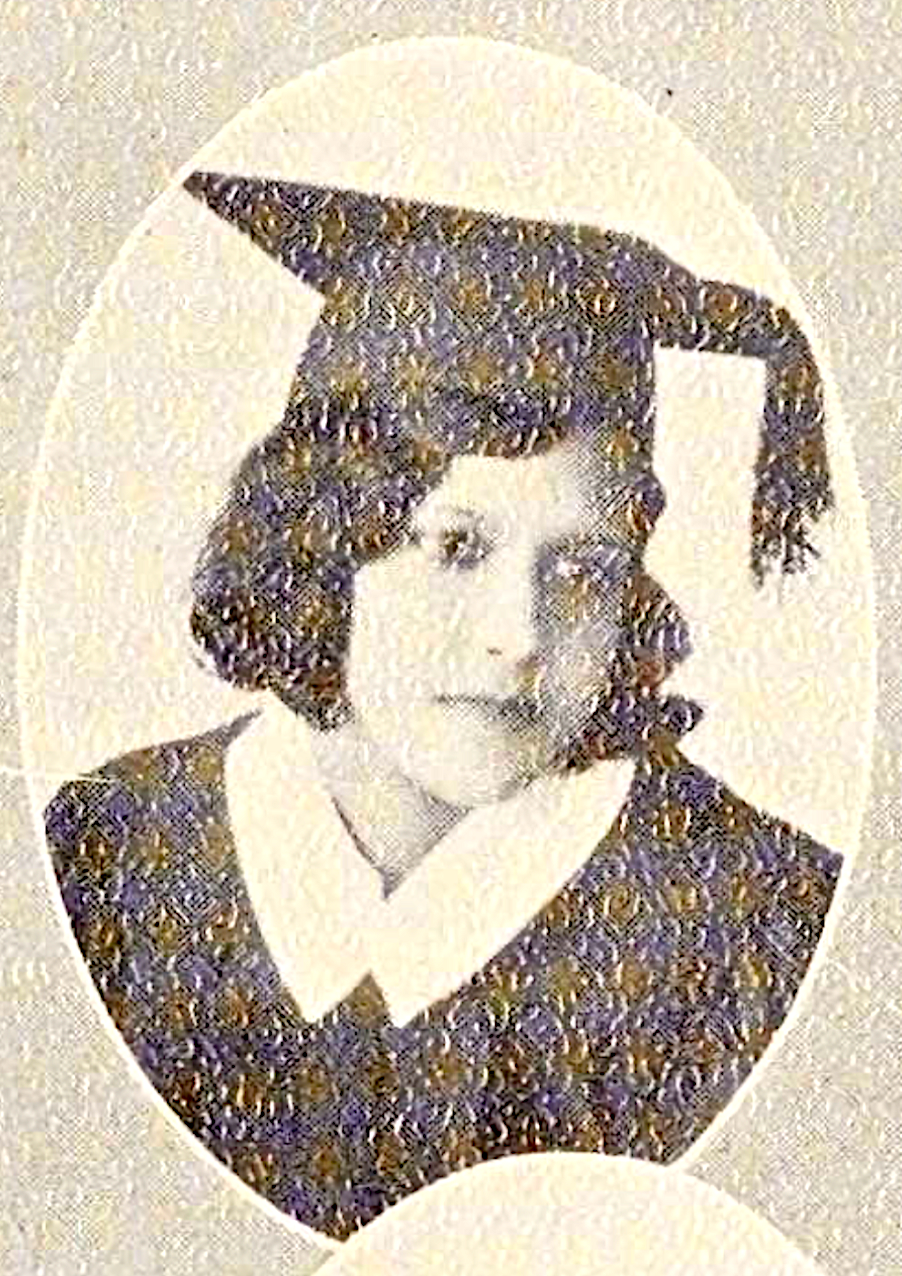
- 1930 photograph of Hines from her senior year yearbook at Livingstone College
- Born: Altonell Jacqueline Hines; September 22, 1907; Norfolk, Virginia
- Died: August 6, 1977 (aged 69); New York City, New York, U.S.
- Other name: Altonell Hines Matthews
- Occupation: opera singer
- Spouse: Edward H. Matthews

Altonell Jacqueline Hines, also known by her married name Altonell Hines Matthews, (September 22, 1907 – August 6, 1977) was an African-American mezzo-soprano. She was in the original cast of both Porgy and Bess (1935) and Four Saints in Three Acts (1934). She was the wife of baritone Edward Matthews who performed with her in both of these shows.

== Early life and education ==
The daughter of Wiley J. Hines and Francis Hines, Altonell Hines was born on September 22, 1907 (Note: Several published sources give her birth year as 1905 with no day or month but this does not match primary documents. Her death record in the U.S., Social Security Death Index, 1935-2014 gives her date of birth as September 22, 1907. This date matches the timeline in her entry in the 1910 United States Federal Census dated to April 18, 1910 when her age is given as two years old. The 1905 year also does not match later census records. Her age is given as 22 in 1930 United States Federal Census dated to April 3, 1930.) in Norfolk, Virginia. Her father was a minister who pastored churches in Virginia and North Carolina. As a teenager she was a member of the African Methodist Episcopal Zion Church in Campostella, Norfolk where she sang in the choir and as a soloist. She also played violin at church events.

Hines attended Livingstone College (LC) where she was a member of the LC's vocal octet. She was voted "Miss Livingstone" for participation in the Easter Classic competition with other historically black colleges during her junior year in 1929. In 1930 she graduated with a Bachelor of Arts degree from LC. In 1931 she gave a recital in Franklin, Virginia. She later graduated with a master's degree in early‐childhood education from Columbia University. She also studied sculpture at the Art Students League of New York.

== Career ==
Hines began her career in New York city in the early 1930s as a member of Eva Jessye's Radio and Concert Choir. She was initially cast in the chorus in the original production of Virgil Thomson's Four Saints in Three Acts. During the rehearsal process she was promoted to the principal role of the Commere after several other singers didn't work out due to the difficulty of the part. She performed the role in its premiere at the Wadsworth Atheneum's Avery Hall on February 7, 1934.

Hines remained with Four Saints in Three Acts when it transferred to Broadway's 44th Street Theatre where it ran from February 20, 1934 - March 17, 1934. It then transferred to the Empire Theatre for further performances. Also in the cast was baritone Edward Matthews in the role of St. Ignatius. They also performed together in the original cast of Porgy and Bess (1935) with Edward as fisherman Jake and Altonell in the chorus of Catfish Row residents.

Hines and Matthews became romantically involved, and married on December 22, 1936. After her marriage, Altonell continued to perform under her maiden name. She sang in a swing music quintet in the early 1940s. Both Altonell and her husband reprised their roles in Four Saints in Three Acts multiple times; including at the The Town Hall in 1941, on a national radio broadcast with the CBS Symphony Orchestra in 1947, on a 1947 recording of the opera made with RCA Victor, and in the 1952 revival of the opera given in New York and in Paris, France.

Altonell Hines died on 6 August 1977. at her home in New York City at the age of 69. Her husband died in a car accident in 1954, Outside of performance, Hines was heavily involved with the National Urban League and the A.M.E. Zion Church on the Hill in New York.

== Discography ==
- Four Saints in Three Acts (1948, RCA Victor)

== Notes and references ==
=== Bibliography ===
- Dietz, Dan (2018). The Complete Book of 1930s Broadway Musicals. Rowman & Littlefield Publishers. ISBN 9781538102770.
- Southern, Eileen (1982). Biographical dictionary of Afro-American and African musicians. Internet Archive. Westport, Conn. : Greenwood Press. ISBN 978-0-313-21339-7.
