= Ruby Greene =

American singer (1909–2002)

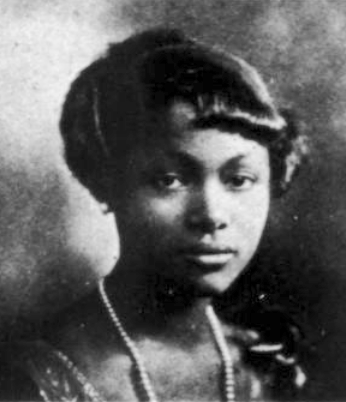
- Ruby Greene, from a 1926 publication
- Born: Ruby Mae Green; July 28, 1909; Savannah, Georgia, U.S.
- Died: January 1, 2002 (aged 92); Philadelphia, Pennsylvania, U.S.
- Other name: Ruby Greene Aspinall
- Occupation: Singer

Ruby Mae Greene (July 28, 1909 – January 1, 2002) was an American singer, best known as the subject of a 1928 painting by James Ormsbee Chapin, titled "Ruby Green Singing".

== Early life ==
Greene was born in Savannah, Georgia, the daughter of Edward Greene and Amanda Greene. She moved to New York City with her divorced mother and younger sisters in 1916, part of the Great Migration. She and her sisters spent about five years living at the Good Samaritan Orphan Home in Newark, New Jersey, because their mother could not support them. She began singing at the orphanage, and learned to play piano. In 1930, after she had some professional experience as a singer, she enrolled at the Institute of Musical Art, where she earned a diploma in 1933.

== Career ==
Greene became contralto soloist in the Saint Mark's Methodist Episcopal Choir in Harlem in 1924. At Carnegie Hall in 1926, she was awarded three medals at a competition held by the New York Music Week Association. She also sang at the annual meeting of the National Association of Negro Musicians in 1926. In 1928, she sang with the Hall Johnson Choir. Miss Frankye A. Dixon, a prominent Harlem concert artist and classical pianist often accompanied Ruby Green at the piano. In the 1930s, she sang with the Eva Jessye Choir, and through Jessye, became acquainted with Ira Gershwin and his wife.

Greene appeared in Four Saints in Three Acts (1934), an opera by Virgil Thomson, based on a libretto by Gertrude Stein. She also sang on the 1947 cast recording of the opera. She had a small part in Set to Music (1939), a Noël Coward revue. She sang with the Fisk Jubilee Singers in the 1940s.

From 1951 to 1955, Greene appeared in the 1953 and 1961 Broadway productions of Porgy and Bess, in an ensemble role, again working with Eva Jessye, and with a young Maya Angelou. She toured with the show in Africa, Europe, and South America. She also appeared in touring companies of Kiss Me, Kate and Show Boat, and was on Broadway again from 1968 to 1970, as James Earl Jones's mother in The Great White Hope. She had a few small television roles in the 1970s.

== Broadway credits ==
Greene appeared in small roles and ensemble parts in six shows on Broadway, spanning thirty years:

- The Pirate (1942)
- Porgy and Bess (1953, 1961)
- The Great White Hope (1968)
- Lost in the Stars (1972)
- The Desert Song (1973)

== Personal life and legacy ==
Ruby Green married Stephen R. "Dutch" Aspinall in 1942; he died in 1973, and her later years were spent with her companion Mary J. Johnson. She died from cancer in 2002, aged 96, in Philadelphia. Her grave is with her husband's, at the Long Island National Cemetery in Farmingdale, New York.

A portrait of Green, titled "Ruby Green Singing", was painted by James Ormsbee Chapin in 1928, and became a popular image, frequently reprinted, after it was published in Harper's Magazine in 1929. The image was reproduced on the cover of the Journal of the American Medical Association in March 2001. The original painting hangs in the Norton Museum of Art in Palm Beach, Florida, where it is a longtime favorite of local museum-goers. "She's just among the privileged characters the public will not stand to see replaced," noted a Norton curator in 1964.

== Discography ==
- Four Saints in Three Acts (1948, RCA Victor)
