= Leslie Uggams =

American actress and singer (born 1943)

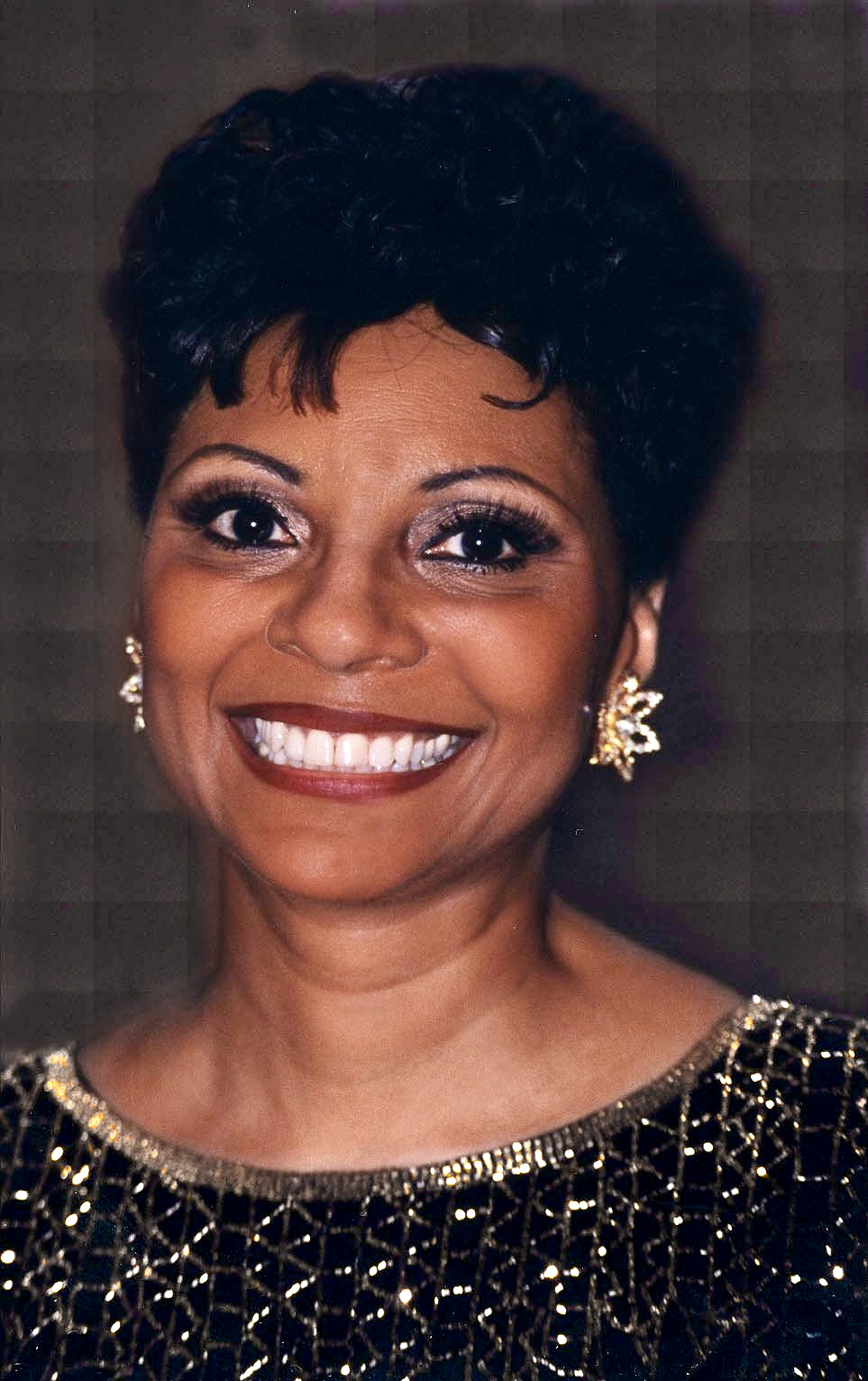
- Uggams in 1997
- Born: Leslie Marian Uggams; May 25, 1943 (age 83); New York City, U.S.
- Education: Juilliard School
- Occupations: Actress; singer
- Years active: 1951–present
- Known for: Kizzy Reynolds – Roots
- Spouse: Grahame Pratt (m. 1965)
- Children: 2
- Website: leslieuggams.com

Leslie Marian Uggams (/ˈʌɡəmz/; born May 25, 1943) is an American actress and singer. After beginning her career as a child in the early 1950s, she garnered acclaim for her role in the Broadway musical Hallelujah, Baby!, winning a Theatre World Award in 1967 and the Tony Award for Best Actress in a Musical in 1968. Uggams gained wider recognition for portraying Kizzy Reynolds in the television miniseries Roots (1977), earning Golden Globe and Emmy Award nominations for her performance.

Later in her career, Uggams received renewed notice with appearances as Blind Al in the superhero films Deadpool (2016), Deadpool 2 (2018), and Deadpool & Wolverine (2024). Her other prominent roles were as Leah Walker on the Fox musical drama series Empire (2016–2020); as Agnes Ellison in the comedy-drama film American Fiction (2023); and as Betty Pearson in the Amazon Original post-apocalyptic drama series Fallout (2024–present), based on the video game of the same name.

== Early life ==
Uggams was born in the Harlem neighborhood of New York City, the daughter of Juanita Ernestine (Smith), a Cotton Club chorus girl/dancer, and Harold Coyden Uggams, an elevator operator and maintenance man, who was a singer with the Hall Johnson choir. She attended the Professional Children's School of New York and Juilliard. Her aunt, singer Eloise C. Uggams, encouraged her musical training. One of her grandfathers was Coyden H. Uggams, twice pastor of Zion Presbyterian Church in Charleston, South Carolina, from 1902 to 1906 and 1913 to 1919.

== Career ==
=== Early work ===
Uggams started in show business as a child in 1951, playing the niece of Ethel Waters on Beulah. That same year she appeared as a featured performer at the famed Apollo Theater in Harlem, alongside Ella Fitzgerald. She made her professional debut at the age of six on Jack Barry's NBC show "Stars And Stardust." Following that, she performed on "Arthur Godfrey's Talent Scouts". Uggams got her biggest break on The Lawrence Welk Show and was a regular on Sing Along with Mitch, starring record producer-conductor Mitch Miller. In January 1954, ten-year-old Uggams released a double-sided single by MGM Records. In 1960, she sang, off-screen, "Give Me That Old Time Religion" in the film Inherit the Wind. Uggams came to be recognized by TV audiences as an upcoming teen talent in 1958 on the musical quiz show series Name That Tune. A record executive was in the studio audience and signed her to a contract. Her records "One More Sunrise" (an English-language cover of Ivo Robic's "Morgen", 1959) and "House Built on Sand" made Billboard magazine's charts.

=== Television and film ===
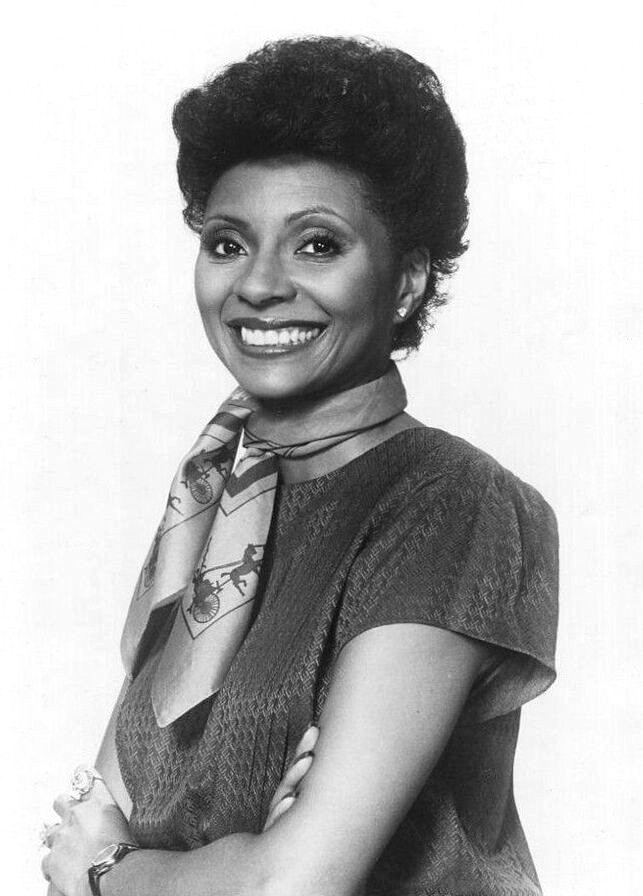
Uggams in 1983

She appeared on The Ed Sullivan Show singing The Beatles' "Yesterday" in 1965 and later had her own television variety show, The Leslie Uggams Show in 1969. This was the first network variety show to be hosted by a black person since The Nat King Cole Show of the mid-1950s. She had a lead role in the 1977 miniseries Roots, for which she received an Emmy nomination, as Kizzy. In 1979, she starred as Lillian Rogers Parks in the Emmy-winning miniseries Backstairs at the White House. She also made guest appearances on such television programs as Family Guy (as herself), I Spy, Hollywood Squares, The Muppet Show, The Love Boat and Magnum, P.I.. In 1996, Uggams played the role of Rose Keefer on All My Children. She won a 1983 Daytime Emmy Award as a host of the NBC game show Fantasy.

In her first film, she was neither seen, nor credited. In Inherit the Wind (1960), she sang the opening, "(Gimme Dat) Old Time Religion", and the closing, "Battle Hymn of the Republic". Her film career includes roles in Skyjacked (1972), Black Girl (1972) and Poor Pretty Eddie (1975), in which she played a popular singer who, upon being stranded in the deep South, is abused and humiliated by the perverse denizens of a backwoods town. She later appeared in Sugar Hill (1994) opposite Wesley Snipes, and played Blind Al in Deadpool (2016) in February 2016. In April 2016, she portrayed Leah Walker, the bipolar mother of Lucious Lyon in the hit Fox series Empire. Uggams appeared as Sadie in the 2017 television film The Immortal Life of Henrietta Lacks, and in 2018, she returned as Blind Al in Deadpool 2.

She is an active Democrat and hosted a 1984 Democratic Telethon. In 1999 and 2021, she guest starred in two episodes of Family Guy. Additionally, she reprised her role as Blind Al in Deadpool & Wolverine.

In 2023, Uggams voiced a character, Grandma, in My Dad the Bounty Hunter and appeared as Agnes in the film American Fiction.

In 2025, in season 3, episode 7 of The Gilded Age she shared a scene with Phylicia Rashad.

=== Stage ===
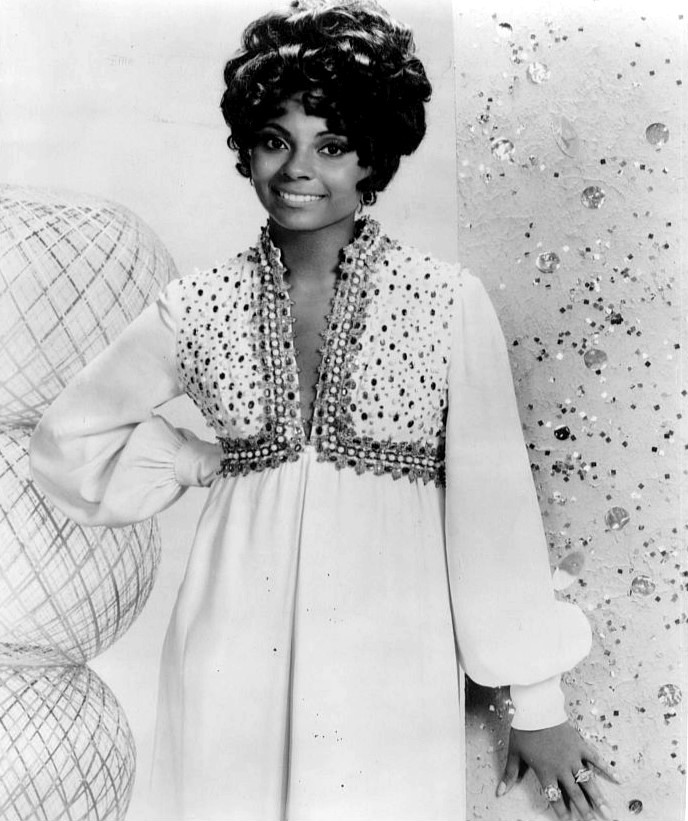
Uggams performing in 1971

Uggams was picked to star in Hallelujah, Baby! after Lena Horne declined the role of Georgina. The musical premiered on Broadway in 1967 and "created a new star" in Uggams. She won the Tony Award for Best Actress in a musical (in a tie with Patricia Routledge). She appeared on Broadway in the revue Blues in the Night in 1982 and in the musical revue of the works of Jerry Herman, Jerry's Girls in 1985. Uggams replaced Patti LuPone as Reno Sweeney in the Lincoln Center revival of Cole Porter's musical Anything Goes on Broadway in March 1989. She had played Reno in a US tour in 1988–1989. Later Broadway roles include Muzzy in Thoroughly Modern Millie (2003–2004) and Ethel Thayer in On Golden Pond at the Kennedy Center in 2004 and on Broadway at the Cort Theatre in 2005. In 2001, she appeared in the August Wilson play King Hedley II, receiving a nomination for the Tony Award, Best Actress in a Play. In January 2009, Uggams played Lena Horne in a production of the stage musical Stormy Weather at the Pasadena Playhouse in California, directed by Michael Bush and choreographed by Randy Skinner. In June 2012, Uggams played Muzzy in a production of Thoroughly Modern Millie at The Muny in St. Louis. In 2014, she starred as Rose in Connecticut Repertory Theatre's Nutmeg Summer Series production of Gypsy, becoming "the first African American female to play Rose in a professional production." In 2024, Uggams appeared in the role of Gran Mimi in the New York City Center Encores! production of Jelly's Last Jam, which ran from February 21 to March 3. December 9-10 2025, Uggams was a guest narrator at Disney's Candlelight Processional at Walt Disney World.

== Personal life ==
Uggams has been married to her longtime manager Grahame Pratt since 1965, at the time a rare high-profile interracial marriage. "It was not as hard as I expected it to be," Uggams says. "I think the reason is that Grahame was not an American white man. But of course we did get mail." Uggams met her husband at the Professional Children's School of New York, where they were both students. The couple met again while she was performing in Sydney, Australia, during one of Uggams's celebrity tours, and he became her manager afterward. After their wedding, they decided to settle in New York City for its relative tolerance of interracial relationships. The couple's daughter Danielle was born in 1970, and their son Justice in 1975.

== Acting credits ==
=== Film ===
Year	Title	Role	Notes
1962	Two Weeks in Another Town	Chanteuse	
1972	Skyjacked	Lovejoy Wells	
1972	Black Girl	Netta	
1975	Poor Pretty Eddie	Elizabeth 'Liz' Wetherly	
1993	Sugar Hill	Doris Holly	
2009	Toe to Toe	Grandma	
2014	Just the Three of Us	Regina	Short film
2016	Deadpool	Blind Al	
2018	Deadpool 2	Blind Al	
2021	The Ravine	Joanna	
2022	Nanny	Kathleen	
2022	Dotty & Soul	Dotty	
2023	American Fiction	Agnes Ellison	
2024	Deadpool & Wolverine	Blind Al	

=== Television ===
Year	Title	Role	Notes
1966	Hullabaloo	Herself / Host	January 10
1966	The Girl from U.N.C.L.E.	Natasha Brimstone	Episode: "The Jewels of Topango Affair"
1967	I Spy	Tonia	Episode: "Tonia"
1969	The Leslie Uggams Show	Herself	10 episodes
1970	Swing Out, Sweet Land	Saloon Singer	TV special
1972	The Mod Squad	Dina Lane	Episode: "Kill Gently, Sweet Jessie"
1974	Marcus Welby, M.D.	Laurie Williams	Episode: "Feedback"
1977	Roots	Kizzy Reynolds	Miniseries
1979	Backstairs at the White House	Lillian Rogers Parks	Miniseries
1981	Sizzle	Vonda	Television film
1982–1984	Fantasy	Host	4 episodes
1984	Magnum, P.I.	Alexis Carter	Episode: "Paradise Blues"
1987	Hotel	Amanda Price	Episode: "Discoveries"
1981–1987	The Love Boat	Leslie / Marion / Callie	3 episodes
1991	The Cosby Show	Kris Temple	Episode: "The Return of the Clairettes"
1993	A Different World	Dr. Eileen Redding	Episode: "College Kid"
1995	Under One Roof	Geneva	Episode: "Secrets"
1996	All My Children	Rose Keefer	October 15 – December 11, 1996
1999	Family Guy	Herself	Episode: "Mind Over Murder"
2011	Memphis Beat	Estelle	Episode: "Troubled Water"
2011	The Good Wife	Suzanne Packer	Episode: "Death Row Tip"
2015	Nurse Jackie	Vivian	3 episodes
2016–2020	Empire	Leah Walker	21 episodes
2017	The Immortal Life of Henrietta Lacks	Sadie	Television film
2021	The Bite	Dr. Hester Boutella	3 episodes
2021	Family Guy	Herself	Episode: "The Birthday Bootlegger"
2019–2022	New Amsterdam	Mama Reynolds	5 episodes
2023	Extrapolations	Isabel Zucker	2 episodes
2023	My Dad the Bounty Hunter	Grandma	Voice
2024–present	Fallout	Betty Pearson	9 episodes
2025	The Gilded Age	Mrs. Ernestine Brown	Season 3, episode 7

=== Theatre ===
Year	Title	Role	Venue	Ref.
1967	Hallelujah, Baby!	Georgina	Martin Beck Theater, Broadway	
1968	Her First Roman	Cleopatra	Lunt-Fontanne Theater, Broadway	
1982	Blues in the Night	Woman #1	Rialto Theater, Broadway	
1985	Jerry's Girls	Performer	St. James Theater, Broadway	
1987	Anything Goes	Reno Sweeney (replacement)	Vivian Beaumont Theater, Broadway	
2001	King Hedley II	Ruby	Virginia Theater, Broadway	
2002	Thoroughly Modern Millie	Muzzy Van Hossmere (replacement)	Marquis Theater, Broadway	
2005	On Golden Pond	Ethel Thayer	Cort Theater, Broadway	

== Discography ==
- The Eyes of God (Columbia CS8174, 1959)
- LESLIE UGGAMS ON TV with Mitch Miller's sing along chorus (Columbia CL1706, 1962)
- So in Love! (Columbia CS8871, 1963)
- A Time to Love (Atlantic 8128, 1966)
- What's an Uggams? (Atlantic SD8196, 1968)
- Just to Satisfy You (Atlantic SD8241, 1969)
- Leslie (Columbia CS9936, 1970)
- Try to See It My Way (Sonday SL8000, 1972)
- Leslie Uggams (Motown M6846S1, 1975)
- Leslie Uggams: On My Way to You: Songs of Alan and Marilyn Bergman (2003)

== Awards and nominations ==
Year	Award	Category	Nominated work	Results	Ref.
2016	All Def Movie Awards	Best Superhero Token Sidekick	Deadpool	Won	
1983	Daytime Emmy Awards	Outstanding Host or Hostess in a Variety Series	Fantasy	Won	
1984	Daytime Emmy Awards	Outstanding Host or Hostess in a Variety Series	Fantasy	Nominated	
1977	Golden Globe Awards	Best Actress in a Television Series – Drama	Roots	Nominated	
2021	Los Angeles Film Awards	Best Ensemble	The Ravine	Won	
1996	NAACP Image Awards	Outstanding Actress in a Daytime Drama Series	All My Children	Nominated	
2009	Ovation Awards	Lead Actress in a Musical	Stormy Weather	Nominated	
1977	Primetime Emmy Awards	Outstanding Lead Actress for a Single Appearance in a Drama or Comedy Series	Roots	Nominated	
2023	Screen Actors Guild Awards	Outstanding Performance by a Cast in a Motion Picture	American Fiction	Nominated	
1967	Theatre World Awards		Hallelujah, Baby!	Won	
1968	Tony Awards	Best Leading Actress in a Musical	Hallelujah, Baby!	Won (Note: Tied with Patricia Routledge for Darling of the Day.)	
2001	Tony Awards	Best Leading Actress in a Play	King Hedley II	Nominated	
2007	TV Land Awards	Anniversary Award	Roots	Nominated	

- 1979: Supersisters trading card set (one of the cards featured Uggams's name and picture)

=== Honorary Degrees ===
- 2015: Awarded an honorary Doctor of Fine Arts degree from the University of Connecticut
- 2019: Awarded an honorary Doctor of Fine Arts degree from the University of Michigan
