= Leonard De Paur =

- De Paur conducting

Background information
- Born: November 18, 1914; Summit, New Jersey, United States
- Died: November 7, 1998 (aged 83) Manhattan, New York, United States
- Genres: Classical; jazz; spirituals
- Occupations: Choral director, composer, conductor
- Years active: 1936–1988

External audio
- You may hear Leonard De Paur conducting his arrangements of music for Christmas on the album Calypso Christmas with the De Paur Chorus in 1956 Here on archive.org

Leonard Etienne De Paur (November 18, 1914 – November 7, 1998) was an American composer, choral director, and arts administrator.

== Early life ==
Leonard De Paur was born in Summit, New Jersey to Hettie Carson de Paur and Ernst Leonard. He moved to Jersey City with his mother, after his parents separated, and attended the local public schools. His musical studies began at the Manual Training Institute in Bordentown, New Jersey, where he played oboe and saxophone. He attended with Frederick Work, brother of John Wesley Work II and uncle of John Wesley Work III.

== Career ==
De Paur began to compose and arrange while he was a member of the Hall Johnson Choir. He sang in the baritone section and served as assistant conductor alongside Jester Hairston. In 1936, De Paur became the musical director of the Negro Unit of the Federal Theater Project in New York City. During this time he was also enrolled at Columbia University and later went on to study at the Institute of Musical Arts, now the Juilliard School.

In 1941 he collaborated with the conductor Alexander Smallens and the orchestral accordionist John Serry Sr. in an oratorio production of Virgil Thomson's opera Four Saints in Three Acts at New York City's Town Hall. De Paur enlisted in the United States Army Air Forces in 1942, was promoted to Lieutenant, and became the music director of the play Winged Victory. During a stint in the infantry, he was assigned to an all male-chorus. The De Paur Infantry Chorus was made up of 35 men from the 372nd Glee Club. Their performances consisted of art song repertory, Caribbean folk music, spirituals, work songs and military songs. In 1946, the De Paur Infantry Chorus was signed to Columbia Artists Management and Columbia Records. The chorus now consisted of men from the 372nd Glee Club, other branches of Armed services, and civilians. For ten years the De Paur Infantry Chorus was the top performing group at Columbia. In 1957, De Paur discontinued the chorus and produced the De Paur Opera Gala, which featured Virgil Thomson's Four Saints in Three Acts, George Gershwin's Porgy and Bess and Oscar Hammerstein's Carmen Jones.

In the early 1960s, the De Paur Chorus was formed to tour 18 African nations under the United States Information Agency. Shortly after the chorus disbanded in 1968, De Paur became the associate director of the Lincoln Center International Choral Festival. A few years later he was named the director of community relations. He created the Lincoln Center Out-of-Doors Festival and the Community Holiday Concert Series. He retired from the Lincoln Center in 1988.

During his career De Paur received honorary Doctor of Music degree from Lewis and Clark College. He was the recipient of the University of Pennsylvania Glee Club Award of Merit and an honorary member of the Morehouse College Glee Club.

De Paur died in Manhattan on November 7, 1998.
