= Four Saints in Three Acts =

1934 opera by Virgil Thomson

- by Virgil Thomson
- Librettist: Gertrude Stein
- Language: English
- Premiere: 7 February 1934; Wadsworth Atheneum, Hartford, Connecticut

Four Saints in Three Acts is an opera composed in 1928 by Virgil Thomson, setting a libretto written in 1927 by Gertrude Stein. It contains about 20 saints and is in at least four acts. It was groundbreaking in form, content, and for its all-black cast, with singers directed by Eva Jessye, a prominent black choral director, and supported by her choir.

Thomson suggested the topic, and the libretto as delivered can be read in Stein's collected works. The opera features two 16th-century Spanish saints—the former mercenary Ignatius of Loyola and the mystic Teresa of Ávila—as well as their colleagues, real and imagined: St. Plan, St. Settlement, St. Plot, St. Chavez, etc. Thomson decided to divide St. Teresa's role between two singers, "St. Teresa I" and "St. Teresa II", and added the master and mistress of ceremonies (Compère and Commère—literally, the "godparents") to sing Stein's stage directions.

== Synopsis ==
After the chorus sings a prelude, the first act takes place at the Ávila Cathedral; it is titled "St. Teresa half indoors and half out of doors". Act two, "Might it be mountains if it were not Barcelona", involves a telescope and glimpses of a heavenly mansion. Act three, "St. Ignatius and one of two literally" is a picnic and contains Ignatius' famous aria "Pigeons on the grass alas". It ends with a tango-like ballet. The brief fourth act ("The sisters and saints reassembled and re-enacting why they went away to stay") is set at the garden of a monastery. Before the curtain falls the Compère announces "Last act", and the chorus replies "Which is a fact".

== Cast ==
The cast of the original production included:

- Edward Matthews as "St Ignatius" (baritone)
- Beatrice Robinson-Wayne as "St Teresa I" (soprano)
- Bruce Howard as "St Teresa II" (contralto)
- Embry Bonner as "St. Chavez" (tenor)
- Bertha Fitzhugh Baker as "St. Settlement" (soprano)
- Randolph Robinson as "St. Plan"
- Abner Dorsey as "the Compère" (bass)
- Altonell Hines as "the Commere" (mezzo-soprano)
- Ruby Greene
- Inez Matthews (Note: Inez Matthews is Edward Matthews' sister.)
- Charles Holland
- The Eva Jessye Choir, led by Eva Jessye

== Productions ==
=== 1934 ===
After its premiere February 7, 1934, at the Wadsworth Atheneum in Hartford, Connecticut, Four Saints in Three Acts opened on Broadway at the 44th Street Theatre February 20, 1934. The opera was notable in defying many aspects of traditional performance. Stein's libretto focused more on an affinity for the sounds of words than on presenting a narrative. Thomson's music was unconventional in its very simplicity. Eva Jessye, a black music pioneer in New York, directed the singers and her choir in the production. The production was directed by John Houseman, who was 31 and had only recently turned his attention to theater after working in the international grain market.

The sets of the first production, designed by artist Florine Stettheimer, included innovative cellophane backdrops and brilliant pure white lighting, and the costumes (also Stettheimer's) were of colorful lace, silk and taffeta. Frederick Ashton provided the choreography (after George Balanchine turned down the job). The involvement of photographers including Lee Miller, Carl Van Vechten and George Platt Lynes in documenting and representing the opera and its original performances in 1934 was explored in an exhibition of photographs and ephemera at The Photographers' Gallery in London in October 2017, with an accompanying book.

Also considered unusual was the portrayal of the European saints by an all-black cast, for which there was no precedent in American history. These unconventional elements led to a successful and well-received first production. While critics were divided, audiences accepted the fantasy world created by the singers, who vividly conveyed the words and melodies given to their saintly characters.

=== 1935 onwards ===
The opera would be performed later as a concert oratorio, as in the 1942 and 1947 radio broadcasts. In addition, a production at Town Hall was conducted by Alexander Smallens in which John Serry Sr. collaborated as the orchestral accordionist and Leonard De Paur as the choir director. In 1948, a recording conducted by Thomson and sung by a cast "substantially identical with that of the original production" was released on five 12-inch 78-rpm records by RCA Victor. Stage performances were produced in 1952 and 1973. In 1981, a New York concert version was performed for Thomson's eighty-fifth birthday celebration. For this performance, Betty Allen, Gwendolyn Bradley, William Brown, Clamma Dale, Benjamin Matthews, Florence Quivar and Arthur Thompson sang the principal parts.

There have also been stagings by Robert Wilson and the choreographer Mark Morris, who created a dance piece for it.

In 2022, a Doxsee Theater production featuring David Greenspan staged Stein's text as a spoken one-man show. It ran from September 15 to October 9, and it received positive reviews from The New York Times, The New York Stage Review, and The New Yorker.

== Recordings ==
- Four Saints in Three Acts (abridged; RCA Victor DM-1244, 1948)
