= The Green Pastures (film) =

1936 film

- Directed by: Marc Connelly; William Keighley
- Screenplay by: Sheridan Gibney
- Based on: The Green Pastures & Ol' Man Adam an' His Chillun; 1930 play & 1928 novel by Marc Connelly & Roark Bradford
- Produced by: Jack L. Warner
- Starring: Rex Ingram; Oscar Polk; Eddie Anderson; Ernest Whitman
- Cinematography: Hal Mohr
- Edited by: George Amy
- Music by: Erich Wolfgang Korngold
- Distributed by: Warner Bros. Pictures
- Release date: July 16, 1936
- Running time: 93 min.
- Country: United States
- Language: English
- Budget: $800,000 (estimated)
- Box office: $3,300,000 (estimated by 1939)

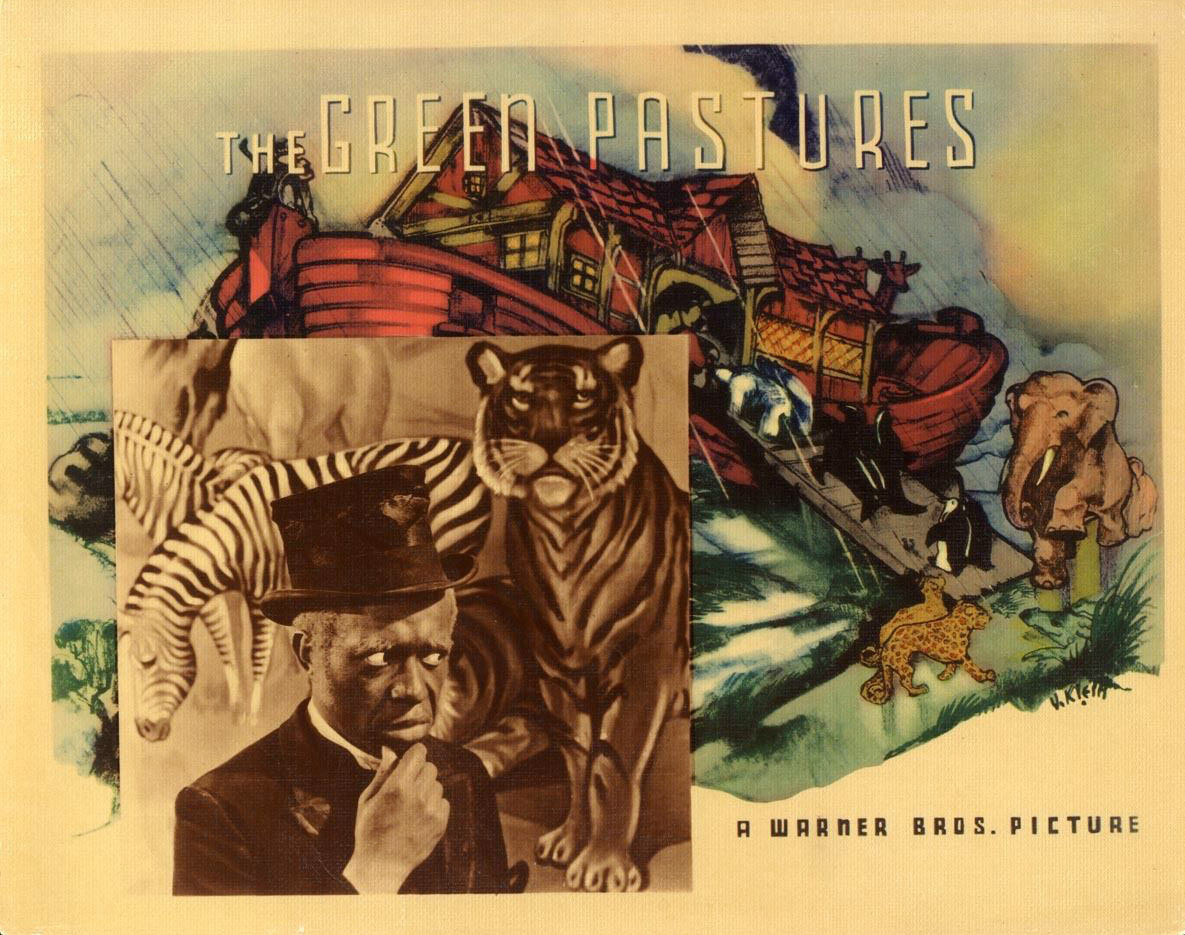
Lobby card depicting Eddie "Rochester" Anderson as Noah

The Green Pastures is a 1936 American film depicting stories from the Bible as visualized by black characters. It starred Rex Ingram (in several roles, including "De Lawd"), Oscar Polk, and Eddie "Rochester" Anderson. It was based on the 1928 novel Ol' Man Adam an' His Chillun by Roark Bradford and the 1930 Pulitzer Prize-winning play of the same name by Marc Connelly.

The Green Pastures was one of only six feature films in the Hollywood Studio era to feature an all-black cast. The film was a commercial success and enjoyed lengthy exhibitions, but element of the film were criticized by civil rights activists at the time and subsequently. The film had a copyright notice in 1936 that was renewed in 1963. The film will become public domain in the United States in 2032 under current copyright law.

Warner's paid $100,000 for the stage play's film rights.

== Plot summary ==
An elderly black man reads from the Book of Genesis to a group of six young children in his house. He answers their questions about God and creation.

One of the girls starts to visualize heaven...

We enter the pearly gates to an all-black heaven, with winged angels sitting on clouds.

The Lord, Jehovah, appears dressed in a black double-breasted jacket. He is given a cup of custard to test. This inspires him to create "a whole mess of firmament". But the firmament is wet so he creates drainage and mountains to let the water gather in rivers and seas. He leaves Gabriel in charge and goes down to inspect his work. Just before leaving he creates "man".

Adam appears (fully clothed) next to a tree. God walks up and says Adam needs a family. He creates Eve (fully clothed) and tells them to enjoy themselves, but forbids them from eating from one tree.

Back in the old lady's house, she quizzes the children and they explain the story of Cain and Abel.

In heaven, Jehovah decides to visit earth again and finds a sassy young woman playing music and chastises her for doing this on a Sunday. She gives her name as Zeba. Her boyfriend Cain appears in a zoot suit and Jehovah leaves. He finds a circle of men kneeling and saying "praise the Lord", but they are playing dice, and he is shocked. He bemoans man's sinning. Then he meets a preacher, brother Noah, who invites him to dinner. Noah's wife is cooking chicken. Noah's knee twitches as it is going to rain. This gives Jehovah an idea: he will make it rain for 40 days and 40 nights. He tells Noah that he will destroy the world, but Noah must build a boat and place two of every animal on the boat, even the snakes. He also allows him one keg of liquor. He draws what to build and says he is to call it the Ark.

The people laugh at Noah building the Ark. A scuffle starts in the crowd and Cain stabs Big Joe and kills him. Noah starts to load the ark as the rain starts.

Back with old lady, she explains that everyone was drowned.

On the waters, Shem releases a dove from the Ark. The dove returns with a green sprig, proving that it had found land.

But the sinning resumes on the new world. Jehovah complains that man takes up too much of his time. He asks for Abraham, Isaac and Jacob (who are older angels). He asks them to help Moses, who is on earth talking with his wife Zipporah. He shows him a burning bush. He asks him to lead his people out of bondage in Egypt. He gives him a rod...

In Egypt, the pharaoh is being entertained by magicians. Moses arrives and wants to show him a trick: he lays down the rod and it changes into a snake. He asks Pharaoh to let the Hebrew slaves go. Pharaoh says no and Moses creates a swarm of bees. Moses strikes the Pharaoh's son dead and Pharaoh releases the Hebrews. They go to a mountain. Moses is old, because they have been wandering in the wilderness for 40 years. Moses tells them to walk around Jericho and blow their ramshorns. Moses is met by God who lets him see the victory at Jericho before leading him to heaven.

The scene skips forward to the court of Babylon where the debauchery and sin of the world has consumed Israel. A prophet of the Lord is pulled in off the street, mistaken for the head Priest of Israel, but he is shot at the order of the King of Babylon. The Priest of Israel asks for forgiveness for the violence but God turns his back upon his chosen people for many years.

Many years later, God is entreated by the now four ancestors of Israel but he says he will do nothing for the chosen people. God hears something, it is the leader defending Jerusalem. He goes down and learns that man has now discovered Mercy through Faith. (The film take liberties with God learning something from man. That God must experience humanity in person rather than from afar.) The defenders are shown fighting before the scene fades into history.

The film closes with God seated in his chair surrounded by the throng of angels as they look on a man (off-screen) who is going to be crucified as God with a far-away look smiles. The clouds close in as the heavenly choir sings.

== Cast ==
- Rex Ingram as De Lawd Jehovah / Adam / Hezdrel
- Oscar Polk as Gabriel
- Eddie "Rochester" Anderson as Noah
- Frank Wilson as Moses
- George H. Reed as Mr. Deshee / Aaron
- Abraham Gleaves as Archangel
- Myrtle Anderson as Eve
- Al Stokes as Cain
- Edna Mae Harris as Zeba
- James Fuller as Cain the Sixth
- George Randol as High Priest
- Ida Forsyne as Noah's Wife
- Ray Martin as Shem
- Charles Andrews as Flatfoot
- Dudley Dickerson as Ham
- Jimmy Burress as Japheth
- Billy Cumby as Abraham / Head Magician / King of Babylon
- Ivory Williams as Jacob
- David Bethea as Aaron
- Ernest Whitman as Pharaoh
- Reginald Fenderson as Joshua
- Clinton Rosemond as Prophet
- Willie Best as Henry - the Angel (uncredited)
- Jesse Graves as General (uncredited)
- Clarence Muse as Angel (uncredited)
- Fred Toones as Zubo (uncredited)

== Reception ==
Despite criticisms about its racial stereotyping, The Green Pastures proved to be an enormously popular film. On its opening day at New York's Radio City Music Hall, tickets sold at a rate of 6,000 per hour. The film was held over for an entire year's run at some theaters. It remained the highest-grossing all-black-cast film until the release of Carmen Jones in 1954. Writing for The Spectator in 1936, Graham Greene gave the film a generally good review, speculating that audiences "will find [it] continuously entertaining, if only intermittently moving". Greene praised director Connelly in particular, describing scenes of "excellent" melodrama, his "ingenious [use of] pathos", and the "admirable" restraint evident in the simplicity of the settings.

Greene's only complaints about the film was that "one may feel uneasy at Mr. Connelly's humour" and his depiction of "the negro mind". Greene observed "the result is occasionally patronising, too often quaint, and at the close of the film definitely false", but ultimately he concludes that the film is "as good a religious play as one is likely to get in this age from a practiced New York writer".

A review in The New York Times under the byline of "B.R.C.," begins with "That disturbance in and around the Music Hall yesterday was the noise of shuffling queues in Sixth Avenue and the sound of motion-picture critics dancing in the street. The occasion was the coming at last to the screen of Marc Connelly's naïve, ludicrous, sublime and heartbreaking masterpiece of American folk" and praised the sincerity of the production's religiosity and the aplomb of its cast, seeing in the movie "not only the 'divine comedy of the modern theatre' but something of the faith that moves mountains".

The film was banned in Australia, Finland and Hungary because in the film God is shown as dark-skinned and that was considered blasphemy. In Finland the film was released ten years later, in 1946.

== See also ==
- List of films about angels
