= Myrtle Anderson =

Jamaican actress

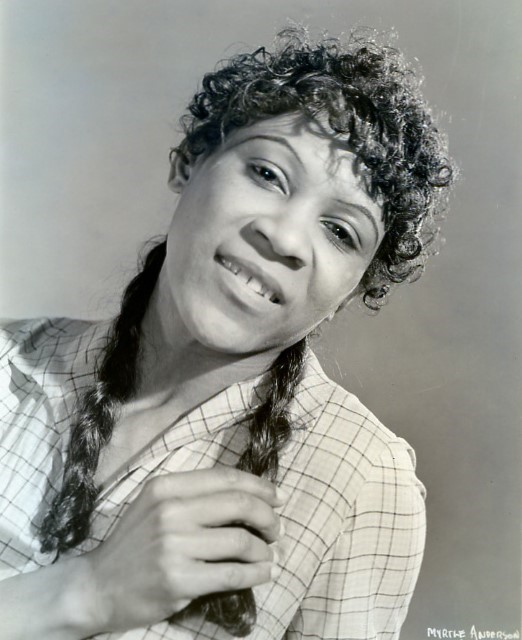
- Born: Myrtle Doris Anderson; May 26, 1901; Kingston, Kingston, Jamaica
- Died: October 5, 1978 (aged 77); Los Angeles, California, USA
- Education: Columbia University
- Occupation: Actress
- Spouse: Henry Simms (m. 1930)

Myrtle Anderson (1901–1978) was a Jamaican actress, singer, and radio performer active in Hollywood in the 1930s, 1940s, and 1950s.

== Biography ==
Myrtle was born in Kingston, Jamaica, to Charles Anderson and Cecilia Tyrell. She later moved to Manhattan with her sisters and her mother — who seems to have remarried — when she was just 5 years old. A talented student and a gifted singer, she eventually graduated from Columbia University.

She was married for a time to a police officer named Henry Simms; as it turned out, Simms was already married to someone else at the time they said "I do" in 1930; he was charged with bigamy in 1935. During their marriage, Myrtle briefly considered becoming a policewoman.

After performing with the Johnson Singers, appearing on Broadway, and getting her own radio show in NYC, Myrtle began winning small roles in films around 1936, when she played Eve in The Green Pastures, a retelling of biblical stories with an all-black cast. Later on in her career, she split her time between taking on film roles and working at the post office in Los Angeles, California.

Of her prospects in Hollywood, she said she preferred comedic roles: "I'm too skinny to play mammy roles and too unglamourous to become a Lena Horne," she explained.

During World War II, she served in the WAC.

== Selected filmography ==
- Jeanne Eagels (1957)
- Something of Value (1957)
- White Witch Doctor (1953)
- The Sun Shines Bright (1953)
- Follow the Sun (1951)
- Whirlpool (1949)
- Oh, You Beautiful Doll (1949)
- The Perils of Pauline (1947)
- The Sea of Grass (1947)
- The Bride Wore Boots (1946)
- Love, Honor and Goodbye (1945)
- Double Up (1943)
- Run, Little Chillun (1943)
- The Lady Is Willing (1942)
- The Vanishing Virginian (1942)
- Sullivan's Travels (1941)
- The Toy Wife (1938)
- The Green Pastures (1936)
