= Four Saints in Three Acts (album) =

1948 studio album

Studio album
- Recorded: June 1947
- Studio: 1948
- Genre: Opera
- Label: RCA Victor

Professional ratings
Review scores
| Source | Rating |
|---|---|
| Audio | |
| The New Records | |
| Saturday Review of Literature | |

Professional ratings
1954 reissue
Review scores
| Source | Rating |
|---|---|
| The Atlantic | (favorable) |
| High Fidelity & Audiocraft | (favorable) |

Four Saints in Three Acts is a studio album containing a recording of Virgil Thomson's opera Four Saints in Three Acts as abridged and conducted by the author. The album was recorded in 1947 by RCA Victor and released in 1948.

== Background and recording ==
The album was recorded in June 1947. The cast was "substantially identical with that of the original production".

== Release ==
The recording was originally issued in 1948 as an album of five 12-inch 78-rpm phonograph records (cat. no. DM-1244). It was also made available on a long-play (as cat. no. LM-1244; and, in 1954, reissued as cat. no. LCT-1139).

== Reception ==
In 2004, the album was added to the National Recording Registry that lists sound recordings considered "culturally or historically significant".

== Track listing ==
12-inch LP – RCA Victor [Red Seal collector's issue] LCT 1139 (1954)

All lyrics are written by Gertrude Stein; all music is composed by Virgil Thomson.

Side 1 (E3RP-5420)
| No. | Title | Artist(s) | Length |
|---|---|---|---|
| 1. | "Four Saints in Three Acts" (Part 1) | Chorus and orchestra Virgil Thomson, conductor Altonell Hines, alto; Ruby Greene, alto; Abner Dorsey, bass; Inez Matthews, sop.; Beatrice Robinson-Wayne, sop.; David Bethea, ten.; Edward Matthews, bar.; Randolph Robinson, bar. |

Side 2 (E3RP-5421)
| No. | Title | Artist(s) | Length |
|---|---|---|---|
| 1. | "Four Saints in Three Acts" (Concluded) | Chorus and orchestra Virgil Thomson, conductor Altonell Hines, alto; Abner Dorsey, bass; Beatrice Robinson-Wayne, sop.; Ruby Greene, alto; Inez Matthews, sop.; Randolph Robinson, bar.; Charles Holland, ten.; Edward Matthews, bar.; David Bethea, ten. |

Notes

- Recorded in June 1947
