= Oh, You Beautiful Doll (film) =

1949 film by John M. Stahl

- Directed by: John M. Stahl
- Written by: Albert Lewis; Arthur Lewis
- Produced by: George Jessel
- Starring: Mark Stevens; June Haver; S.Z. Sakall
- Cinematography: Harry Jackson
- Edited by: Louis R. Loeffler
- Production company: Twentieth Century Fox Film Corporation
- Distributed by: Twentieth Century Fox Film Corporation
- Release date: November 11, 1949 (New York City)
- Running time: 93 minutes
- Country: United States
- Language: English
- Box office: $1,950,000 (US rentals)

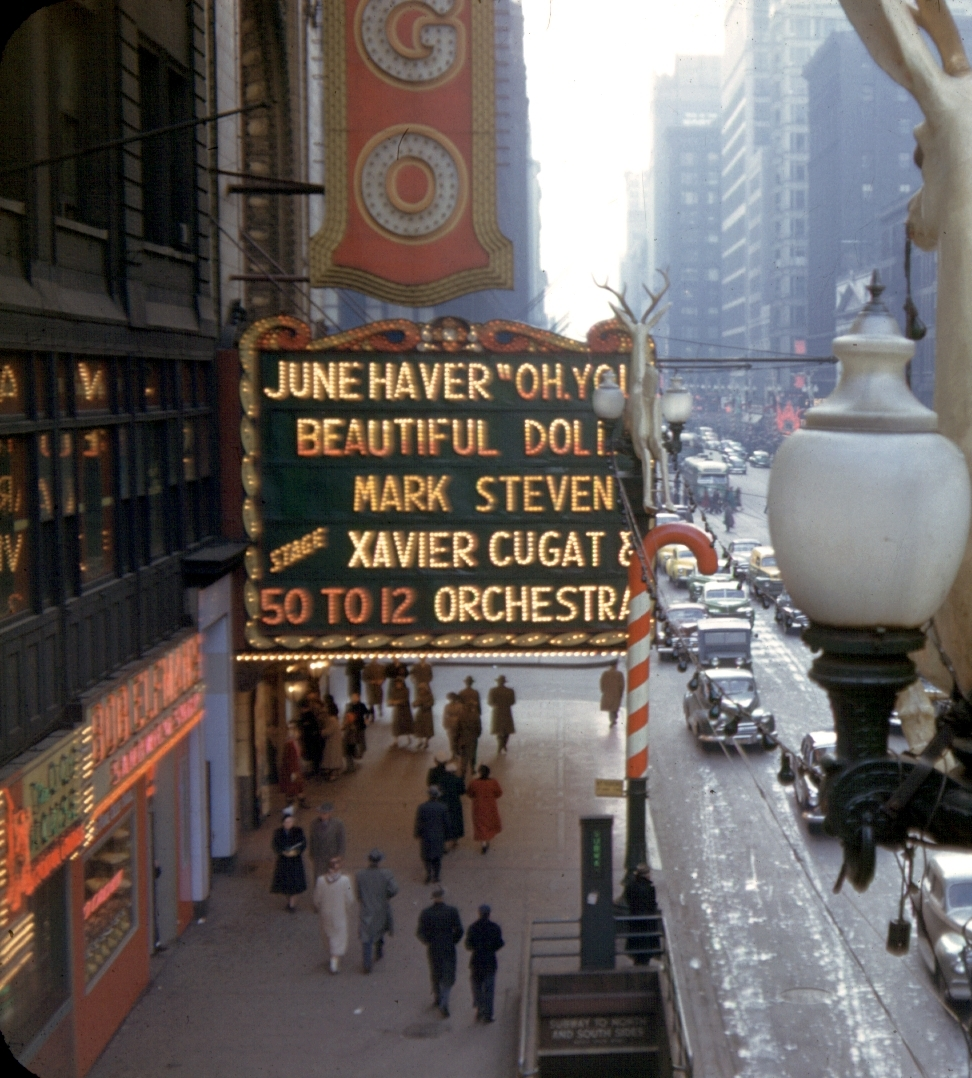
1949 photograph of the Marquee of the Chicago Theatre advertising showings of the film

Oh, You Beautiful Doll is a 1949 American musical film directed by John M. Stahl (his final film), starring the musical queen June Haver and Mark Stevens. Co-stars included S.Z. Sakall, Charlotte Greenwood, and Gale Robbins.

== Plot ==
The film is a fictionalized biography of Fred Fisher, a German-born American writer of Tin Pan Alley songs. Tin Pan Alley promoter (Mark Stevens) turns serious composer Fred Breitenbach (S.Z. Sakall) into songwriter Fred Fisher. Fred Fisher is his assumed name in real life and Breitenbach is his birth surname. In the film, many Fisher songs were given a symphonic arrangement that was performed at Aeolian Hall. Among the Fisher songs heard were:

- Chicago
- Dardanella
- Peg O' My Heart
- Who paid the rent for Mrs. Rip Van Winkle? (1914)

== Cast ==
Leading actors

- Mark Stevens – Larry Kelly
- June Haver – Doris Fisher
- S.Z. Sakall – Fred Fisher aka Alfred Breitenbach
- Charlotte Greenwood – Anna Breitenbach
- Gale Robbins – Marie Carle
- Jay C. Flippen Lippy Brannigan
- Andrew Tombes – Ted Held
- Eduard Franz – Gottfried Steiner

Other cast

- Sam Ash – quartet
- Warren Jackson – quartet
- Donald Kerr – quartet
- Al Klein – quartet
- Frank Kreig – head waiter
- Nestor Paiva – Lucca

Uncredited cast

- Myrtle Anderson – cook
- Curt Bois – Zaltz
- Edward Clark – Cooper - desk clerk
- Tom Coleman – Policeman
- John Davidson – Davis - Steiner's secretary
- Sam Finn – minor role
- Joseph Forte – waiter
- Robert Gist – musician
- James Griffith – Joe - reporter
- Sam Harris – composer
- Eddie Kane – Charles Hubert
- Kenner G. Kemp – audience spectator
- Carl M. Leviness – composer (uncredited)
- Sidney Marion – minor role (uncredited)
- Marion Martin – big blonde
- Frank Mills – man in jail
- Eula Morgan – Madame Zoubel
- John Mylong – toastmaster
- William J. O'Brien – waiter
- Torchy Rand – Sophie - waitress
- Dick Rich – burly man in saloon
- Maurice Samuels – Italian
- Harry Seymour – Volk, nightclub M.C.
- Lester Sharpe – music store proprietor
- Ray Teal – policeman
- Phil Tully – desk sergeant
- Ray Walker – box office attendant
- Billy Wayne – reporter
- Robert Williams – police lieutenant
- Victor Sen Yung – houseboy
- Al Jolson; himself
