= Hall Johnson =

American composer and arranger (1888–1970)

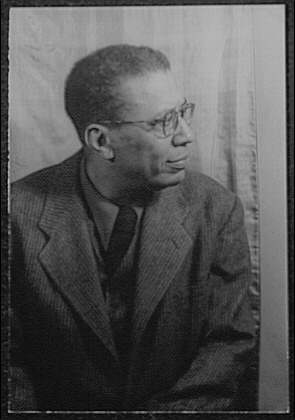
- Hall Johnson (1947); Photo by Carl Van Vechten

Background information
- Born: Francis Hall Johnson; March 12, 1888; Athens, Georgia, U.S.
- Died: April 30, 1970 (aged 82) New York City, U.S.
- Genres: Spiritual music, classical
- Occupations: Composer, arranger, musician
- Instruments: Violin, viola, piano

Francis Hall Johnson (March 12, 1888 – April 30, 1970) was an American composer and arranger of African-American spiritual music. He is one of a group—including Harry T. Burleigh, R. Nathaniel Dett, and Eva Jessye—who had great success performing African-American spirituals.

== Early years ==
Francis Hall Johnson was born on March 12, 1888, the fourth of six children of Alice Virginia Sansom and William Decker Johnson (1842–1909), who was a pastor in the AME Church and a president of Allen University.

Johnson received an extensive education. He attended the private, all-black Knox Institute in Athens, Georgia, and earned a degree from Allen University in Columbia, South Carolina. He also attended Atlanta University, the Juilliard School, Hahn School of Music, and the University of Pennsylvania.

As a boy, Johnson was tutored on piano by his older sister, and he taught himself to play the violin after hearing a violin recital given by Joseph Henry Douglass, grandson of Frederick Douglass.

== Career ==
Johnson's debut as a professional violinist occurred in a concert in New York in 1910. He went on to play the violin and viola professionally, including in the orchestra for the 1921 musical, Shuffle Along. Johnson played in the orchestra led by James Reese Europe as it accompanied Vernon and Irene Castle on tour, and he played with the New York Syncopated Orchestra, led by Will Marion Cook in 1918.

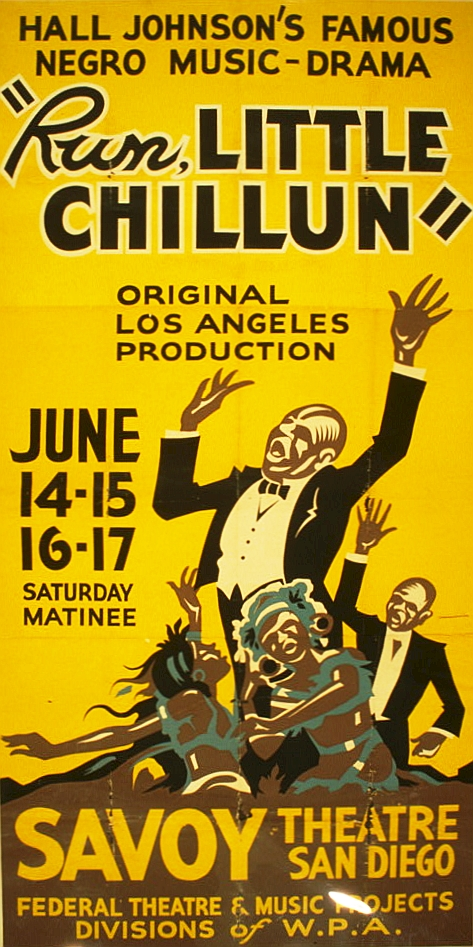
Poster for Hall Johnson's Run, Little Chillun at San Diego

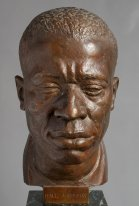
Bust of Hall Johnson

In time, however, he became more interested in choral music, forming the Hall Johnson Negro Choir, the first of many choral ensembles, in 1925. The group first performed professionally at the Pythian Temple in 1928. Johnson and his choir became renowned through their participation in the 1930 Broadway production of Marc Connelly's The Green Pastures as well as in national and international tours of the play, radio versions, the 1936 film adaptation, and Hallmark Hall of Fame television broadcasts.

Johnson would also go on to arrange music for and conduct his choir in more than thirty feature-length Hollywood films, besides a number of short films and cartoons. Johnson wrote Run, Little Chillun, which premiered on Broadway in 1933 and was produced in Los Angeles in 1935–1937 under the auspices of the Federal Theater Project. Another production of the folk opera was featured in San Francisco in 1939 as an exhibit of the Works Progress Administration at the Golden Gate International Exposition.

Also in 1937, the Hall Johnson Choir was featured in the soundtracks of the Frank Capra film Lost Horizon, Walt Disney's Snow White and the Seven Dwarfs and Hal Roach's Zenobia. In 1941 they returned for yet another Disney film, Dumbo, specifically for the song "When I See An Elephant Fly"; Johnson himself voiced one of the crow characters, the Deacon Crow. Some members of the choir also provided voices to these characters as well except Cliff Edwards, who voiced the lead Dandy Crow.

In addition to his theatrical work, Johnson wrote the Easter cantata Son of Man, which premiered at New York's City Center in 1946, the same year that the Hall Johnson Choir sang in Disney's Song of the South. In 1951, the Hall Johnson Choir was selected by the United States Department of State to represent the United States at the International Festival of Fine Arts held in Berlin, Germany.

Johnson wrote of the spiritual:

True enough, this music was transmitted to us through humble channels, but its source is that of all great art everywhere—the unquenchable, divinely human longing for a perfect realization of life. It traverses every shade of emotion without spilling over in any direction. Its most tragic utterances are without pessimism, and its lightest, brightest moments have nothing to do with frivolity. In its darkest expressions there is always a hope, and in its gayest measures a constant reminder. Born out of the heart-cries of a captive people who still did not forget how to laugh, this music covers an amazing range of mood. Nevertheless, it is always serious music and should be performed seriously, in the spirit of its original conception.

Johnson was fluent in both German and French. Among the singers he coached were Marian Anderson, Charles Holland, Robert McFerrin and Shirley Verrett. His arrangements of the spirituals have been recorded by some of the world's finest artists.

== Death ==
Johnson, aged 82, died of burns received during a fire at his New York apartment on April 30, 1970.

== Recognition ==
In 1975, Johnson was posthumously honored for his work in films by being elected to the Black Filmmakers Hall of Fame.

A 1931 bust of Johnson by Minna Harkavy was shown at an exhibition at the Moscow Museum of Western Art and was bought by the Pushkin Museum in Moscow.

In 1934, the Philadelphia Academy of Music recognized Johnson with an honorary doctorate.

Johnson's photograph, taken by Sidney Cowell in 1960, is included in the National Portrait Gallery of the United States.

In September 2020, the Athens Cultural Affairs Commission included Hall Johnson in the first ten inductees of the Athens Music Walk of Fame installed downtown, alongside other, more contemporary honorees such as R.E.M., The B-52's, and Vic Chesnutt. A plaque mounted in the sidewalk and mobile-app beacon honor Johnson's career.

== Filmography ==
Year	Title	Role	Notes
1938	My Old Kentucky Home	Leader of Hall Johnson Choir	
1941	Dumbo	Deacon Crow	Voice, Uncredited
1942	Heart of the Golden West	Choir Leader	Uncredited, (final film role)
