= Blind Al =

Marvel Comics character

- Blind Al as depicted in Deadpool vol. 3 #25 (February 1999). Art by Walter A. McDaniel (penciller), Walden Wong (inker), and Matt Hicks (colorist).

Publication information
- Publisher: Marvel Comics
- First appearance: Deadpool #1 (January 1997)
- Created by: Joe Kelly (writer); Ed McGuinness (artist)

In-story information
- Alter ego: Althea Winifred Sanderson
- Species: Human
- Place of origin: Earth
- Partnerships: Deadpool
- Notable aliases: Blind Alfred

Althea Winifred Sanderson, better known as Blind Al, is a fictional character appearing in American comic books published by Marvel Comics. She is commonly depicted as a supporting character of the antihero Deadpool.

Al first appeared in Deadpool #1, living with him in "The Deadhut", his house in San Francisco. At first her relationship with him was unclear, but over time it would reveal itself as highly complex and bizarre.

Actress Leslie Uggams portrayed Blind Al in the 2016 feature film Deadpool and its 2018 sequel set in the X-Men film series. She also reprised the role in Deadpool & Wolverine (2024), set in the Marvel Cinematic Universe (MCU).

== Fictional biography ==
Al is a skinny old woman who, as her name suggests, is blind. Her origin is never explicitly elaborated. It is eventually revealed that she was somehow involved with British intelligence, although in what capacity is unknown. She was already blind by this point and had been most of her life. Wade Wilson, the mercenary who would eventually become Deadpool, was hired to kill her in Zaire, where she was stationed. What actually occurred is unknown, but apparently Wilson killed everyone around except her, allowing her to flee. Years later, after he had gotten cancer, received a healing factor from Weapon X, gone insane, and become Deadpool, Wilson met up with Al again and captured her.

Thus began the bizarre relationship between the two, with Al acting as a cross between a prisoner, friend, housekeeper, Greek Chorus and mother-figure to Deadpool. At times, Wade could be unbelievably cruel to Al. He would frequently insult her and play cruel pranks, taking advantage of her blindness. He forbade her visitors and would kill anyone who tried to help her escape. When she angered him, he would put her in the Box, a small room filled with sharp objects (although he never actually locked the door, counting on her fear of him to keep her imprisoned). He also forced her to cook and clean for him, and dangled the prospect of freedom in front of her only to snatch it away.

On the other hand, Al seems to wield a subtle authority over him, and appears to be the only person who is not afraid to stand up to him. The pranks never bother her, as she is more than clever enough to get back at Deadpool (putting laxatives in his food is a favorite), and she is even sharper than he is when it comes to insults. When the series opened, Al had already been with Wade for years, and a sort of peace had developed between them. Al seems grateful for having food, a roof over her head, all the Matlock she can "watch," and safety from those who wanted her dead, all in return for doing a few chores and putting up with Wade's twisted sense of humor. She is his closest confidant (even more so than Weasel) and trips to the Box become so infrequent as to be unheard of. She has an immense debt of gratitude to Deadpool for saving her life, and it gradually becomes clear that she is sticking it out with him because she believes that he has the potential to become a truly good person, and she hopes her influence over him may encourage him in that direction. She also hints that she has a rather dark past, and feels that redeeming Wade may help her make up for past deeds. They share an adventure together through time, where Al ends up impersonating May Parker. She seems as much a parent as a prisoner to him, and he even gives her Deuce the Devil Dog as a present.

However, Deadpool soon hits a low personal ebb, and the peace between them becomes strained. This culminates in a trip to the Box after it becomes clear that Blind Al had been keeping visits from Weasel a secret from him. She gets her revenge however, by coldly shunning him, and referring to him as "master" to highlight his cruelty. The guilt he feels is enormous, and after meeting and having some counseling by Monty the precog, he declares her a free woman (just when he is teleported away by Ajax). Knowing about her good influence, she refuses to leave, so he teleports with her into a park, they talk (she was pretending she would be afraid to leave then) and he leaves her there. They meet again in the Golden Gate Park, San Francisco, presumably the same park where he left her.

While Al and Weasel are in The Box, Al recounts a tale of particular disturbance. About two years into her imprisonment, Deadpool left on a long assignment, and Al decided to leave for a friend's in Maine. She escaped, trekked across the country, and when she arrived at her friend's house, Deadpool was waiting for her, her friend tortured nearly to death in front of his dogs. She ends the story by saying "That is how you build a prison."

Since then, her appearances have become much more sporadic, although it is clear that she and Deadpool are still in contact. She appeared in Cable & Deadpool, where Wade approaches her to validate his plan to restore his reputation by battling Taskmaster.

Deadpool sends her a braille invitation to his marriage with Shiklah: however, due to a mishap with Wade's less-than-perfect grasp of braille, she goes to a gang funeral instead, utterly oblivious to her error.

She also appeared in Thunderbolts (vol. 2) #10 (August 2013), in which she helps Deadpool and Agent Venom to find the location of Dr. Vanko.

== Personality ==
In keeping with the humorous tone of Deadpool's stories, Al's personality was not what one would expect from an imprisoned old blind woman. She exhibits toughness, is cynical in the extreme, and is able to beat even the wisecracking title character in a battle of insults. When they matched wits, Al usually got the better of Deadpool, making his pranks backfire and treating him like a spoiled child. Al even once sabotaged all of Deadpool's weapons, her rationale being that his death would be the worst-case scenario, and then she would not have to worry about retaliation.

Despite their antagonistic relationship, Blind Al occasionally showed that she genuinely cared for Wade, as when she refused to leave him after being granted her freedom, and baked him a cake when he attempted to become a hero.

Deadpool gave Al Deuce the Devil Dog (which Weasel had won from Foggy Nelson in a poker game) as a joke. Although the dog adored her, she seemed to think of him as nothing but a "moronic flea-factory", and promptly had him neutered.

Her hobbies include "Needlepoint, thimble collecting, planning escape routes... typical old lady twaddle." She loves the show Matlock, and also expressed a fondness for The Daily Show.

== Questions of identity ==
Joe Kelly originally intended her to be the first Black Widow: "We were going to do the origin story of Blind Al, and show her as the original Black Widow and show how she was responsible for Wade getting cancer". This is no longer considered canon.

She was close friends with Captain America before he was frozen in the 1940s. She described her last meeting with him during a pep talk to Wade in which she produced a golden medal given to her by a young man she called "Blondie" in Moscow. Upon Deadpool losing the medal on a battlefield, Captain America recognized it, read the inscription aloud and recalled Al by name.

It is unclear exactly how old Al is. In Deadpool #6 (June 1997), Al refers to herself as a sexagenarian but she later claims to remember Flapper-dresses (popular in the 1920s) and was later referred to by Montgomery Burns, a precog at Landau, Luckman, and Lake, as a septuagenarian.

== Other versions ==
An alternate universe version of Blind Al appears in Deadpool MAX. This version is an agent of the CIA and head of the Deadpool, an unsanctioned asylum that trains assassins. Prior to her work with the Deadpool, Sanderson orchestrated the murders of John F. Kennedy, Robert F. Kennedy, Martin Luther King Jr., Che Guevara, and John Lennon.

== In other media ==
=== Film ===
Blind Al / Althea appears in the 21st Century Fox's X-Men film series, portrayed by Leslie Uggams.

- Blind Al is introduced in Deadpool. This version is Deadpool's roommate whom he met through an ad placed on Craigslist. Additionally, she has a known affinity for cocaine, regularly helps Deadpool wash his costume, and shares his love for IKEA furniture.
- Uggams reprises the role in Deadpool 2. Deadpool returns to the apartment they shared after the death of his fiancé Vanessa. Al offers her condolences but encourages him to not let Vanessa's death stop him from living the rest of his life. After being ripped in half by the Juggernaut, Deadpool recovers at Al's apartment.
- Uggams reprises her role as Blind Al in the Marvel Cinematic Universe film Deadpool & Wolverine. She shows up at Wilson's surprise birthday party at his apartment, along with all of Wilson's friends. A few days after Wilson saved his universe to protect his friends, she meets Logan, who is attending a family dinner, along with Laura.

=== Video games ===
Blind Al appears in Marvel's Spider-Man 2. This version's full name is Alma.
