= Helen Dowdy =

American actress

Helen Dowdy (? - Feb. 1971) was an American Broadway actress and singer who played the role of Queenie in the 1946 revival of Kern and Hammerstein's Show Boat (a role originally played by Tess Gardella in 1927). She was born in New York City.

In 1930, Dowdy was a member of the Heaven Gate Singers in Scarlet Sister Mary.

Dowdy created the roles of Lily and the Strawberry Woman in George Gershwin's Porgy and Bess — roles she played for nearly 20 years in several productions. She also appeared in Run, Little Chillun. In the 1951 so-called "complete" recording of the opera, Dowdy sang both roles as well as that of Maria.

In 1944, Dowdy performed with Katherine Dunham, troupe on tour. Dowdy's television debut came on December 11, 1950, in a production of "Hit the Deck" on NBC. She also appeared on TV on the October 17, 1957, episode of Hallmark Hall of Fame as the Stout Angel in a television production of Marc Connelly's Pulitzer Prize-winning play, The Green Pastures.

Dowdy married Clifford Wilson in Baltimore, Maryland, on July 27, 1942. She died in February 1971 in New York.
