= Mabel Ridley =

American opera singer

- Born: January 1894; Augusta, Georgia, U.S.
- Origin: Augusta
- Died: April 18, 1938 (aged 44) New York, U.S.
- Genres: Mezzo-soprano
- Occupation: Singer

Mabel Ridley (January 1894 – April 18, 1938) was an American mezzo-soprano singer who appeared in Broadway theatre and revues in the 1920s and 1930s.

== Early life ==
Mabel Ridley was born in Augusta, Georgia, to Charles and Katherine Ridley in January 1894. Her family were African-American Catholics who had been in the area for several generations. Back in 1843, on the occasion of their marriage, Mabel Ridley's grandparents Ulysses Ridley and Antoinette (Dugas) Ridley had been recorded as free people of color. Ridley had two sisters, Julia and Antoinette. Ridley later said that her first language was Gullah and her second English.

It appears that Ridley may have been married to a man surnamed Edwards.

== Career as performer ==
Mabel Ridley was educated at Augusta's Haines Institute, which was founded by African-American educator Lucy Craft Laney. The school nurtured her musical abilities, and after she left she moved to New York. Early on, Ridley appeared in several productions by the Tutt Brothers, including a touring musical, Non-Sense (1925), and two touring revues, Rainbow Chasers (1925) and Everybody's Talking (1925). Also in 1926, she appeared in the musical revue Desires of 1927, which was cowritten by Andy Razaf. In 1927, she appeared in the touring vaudeville revue Miss Bandanna, by Clarence Muse and starring Moms Mabley.

In 1929, she appeared on Broadway in another Tutt Brothers production, the musical comedy Deep Harlem, which took as its subject black history in America from slavery through the 1920s. It featured music by Joe Jordan, and Ridley played several roles in the show, including Princess Ola. Underfunded, it closed quickly, and Ridley shortly thereafter joined a revue, Ebony Show Boat, that opened in Harlem, toured to Philadelphia, and then returned to New York.

A year later, Ridley performed in the first run of Marc Connelly's Pulitzer Prize–winning drama The Green Pastures. That same year, she performed with the Heaven Gate Singers in Scarlet Sister Mary, a play based on a Pulitzer Prize–winning novel of the same name by South Carolina author Julia Peterkin and starring Ethel Barrymore in blackface.

The last role Ridley is known to have performed was Clara in a Charleston, South Carolina, production of George Gershwin's opera Porgy and Bess. Ridley died in New York on April 18, 1938. Her funeral was attended by an estimated 3,000 people. Students from the Peter Pan Dancing School, where she taught, performed a song. Members of the newly-formed Negro Actors Guild also took part. A second funeral was held April 24 at the Immaculate Conception church in Augusta. She was buried at Cedar Grove Cemetery in that city.
