= Edward Matthews (baritone) =

American opera singer

Edward Matthews (1904 or 1905 – 20 February 1954) was a pioneering African-American baritone opera singer.

Matthews was born in Ossining, New York. In 1934, he created the role of Ignatius of Loyola in Virgil Thomson's Four Saints in Three Acts, which he reprised in the 1952 revival of the opera – his last appearance on Broadway. In 1935, he created his most famous role, Jake the fisherman, in the original 1935 production of George Gershwin's Porgy and Bess. Here, Matthews introduced the song "A Woman Is a Sometime Thing". He recreated the role in the 1942 revival of the opera, and in the 1951 three-LP album set – the most complete recording of Porgy and Bess made up to that time.

Matthews died in a car crash on 20 February 1954, aged 49, near Woodbridge, Virginia.

== Discography ==
- Four Saints in Three Acts (1948, RCA Victor)
