= Ol' Man Adam an' His Chillun =

Folk tale collection by Roark Bradford

Ol' Man Adam an' His Chillun: Being the Tales They Tell about the Time When the Lord Walked the Earth Like a Natural Man
- Author: Roark Bradford
- Illustrator: A. B. Walker
- Language: English
- Subject: Religion, dogma
- Genre: Drama
- Publisher: Harper & Brothers
- Publication date: 1928
- Publication place: United Kingdom; United States
- Media type: Print: Hardcover
- Pages: 264 pp (first edition)
- OCLC: 23314714

Ol' Man Adam an' His Chillun: Being the Tales They Tell about the Time When the Lord Walked the Earth Like a Natural Man is a collection of pseudo-African American folktales written by author Roark Bradford and published in the United Kingdom and the United States in 1928. It was compared to the tales about Uncle Remus and had moderate success, the Chicago Post called it "howlingly funny". Poet Sterling Allen Brown criticized its farcical depiction of African-American culture and religion.

The book was soon adapted to a play The Green Pastures by Marc Connelly which won the 1930 Pulitzer Prize for Drama. This was later made into the 1936 movie The Green Pastures.

Black actor Mantan Moreland adapted it for Caedmon Records based on material in the book.
