= Alexander Smallens =

American conductor and music director (1889–1972)

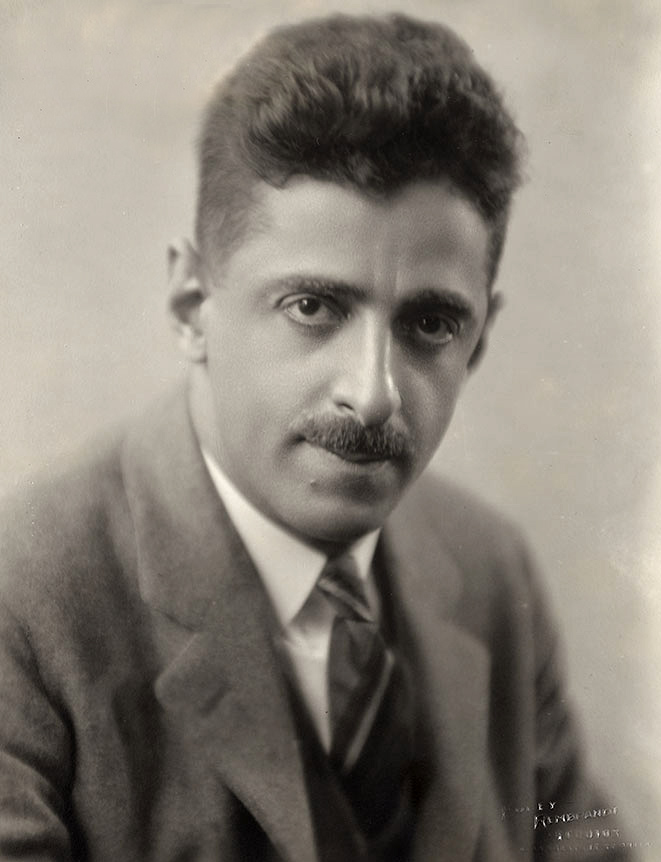
- Smallens, c. 1930
- Born: January 1, 1889; Saint Petersburg, Russia
- Died: November 24, 1972 (aged 83); Tucson, Arizona, U.S.
- Occupations: Conductor; music director
- Spouse: Ruth White Wertheim (m. 1935; died 1959)
- Children: 1

Alexander Smallens (January 1, 1889 – November 24, 1972) was a Russian-born American conductor and music director.

== Biography ==
Smallens was born in Saint Petersburg, Russia, and emigrated to the United States as a child, becoming an American citizen in 1919. He studied at the New York Institute of Musical Art until 1909, when he traveled to France to study at the Conservatoire de Paris.

Returning to the United States, Smallens was a conductor or music director at several American music organizations including the Boston Opera Company (1911–1914), the Anna Pavlova Ballet Company (1917–1919), the Chicago Opera Company (1919–1923), the Philadelphia Civic Opera Company (1924–1930), the Philadelphia Orchestra (1928–1934) and the Radio City Music Hall (1947–1950).

In addition, Smallens worked briefly on Broadway, conducting the premieres of Thomson's Four Saints in Three Acts in 1934 and Gershwin's Porgy and Bess the next year. (Both works were operas, not the musicals normally expected in Broadway theatres.) Smallens also conducted the Porgy and Bess revivals on Broadway in 1942 and 1953, as well as the famous 1952 world tour of the work, which culminated in that 1953 Broadway production.

Smallens also conducted orchestras for music as part of several documentary films in the late 1930s and early 1940s. He retired from music in 1958 and moved to Sicily. In 1972, Smallens died in Tucson, Arizona and is buried there.

== Personal life ==
In 1924, Smallens was involved in an affair with composer Marc Blitzstein during a trip the two took in Europe; this was the latter's first relationship. In 1935, he married Ruth White Wertheim, former wife of Maurice Wertheim. She died in 1959. Smallens had one son, Alexander Smallens Jr., who worked in radio (WABC-FM), and two grandchildren.

== Discography ==
- Mendelssohn – The Stadium Orchestra of New York – World Record Club (# W6404-MX101296, W6405-MX101297) as Orchestra Conductor (1957)
- Highlights From Porgy and Bess – RCA Victor Red Seal (# C-25) as Orchestral Conductor
- Porgy & Bess – Audite (#23.405) as Orchestra Conductor (1952)
- Selections from Porgy & Bess – Decca (#DL 8042) as Orchestra Conductor
- Toreador Song & Habanera from Carmen – V Disc (#208A, #208B) As Orchestra Conductor (1944)
- Porgy & Bess – Decca (#BME 9299) as Orchestra Conductor (1956)
- Sempre Libera – RCA Victor Red Seal (#14184) as Orchestra Conductor
- Charpentier/Massenet – RCA Victor Red Seal (# 14153) as Orchestra Conductor
