= Run, Little Chillun =

1933 American musical play by Hall Johnson

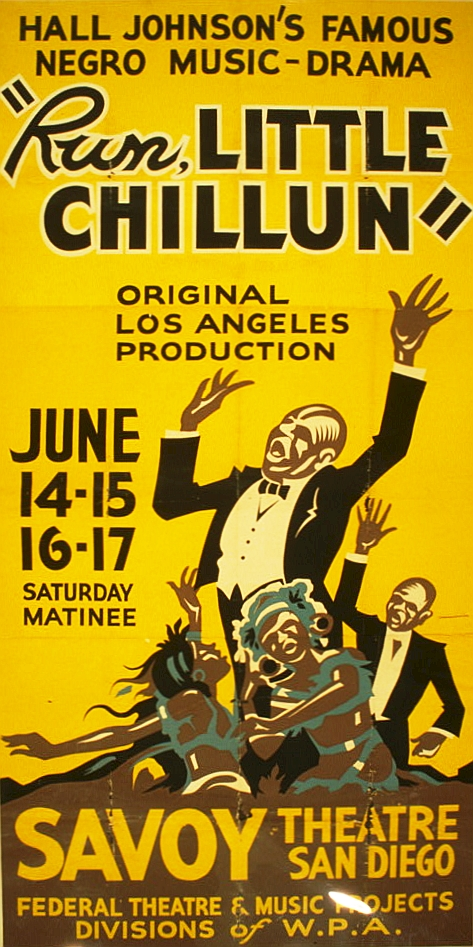
- Written by: Hall Johnson

Premiere
- Date premiered: 1933

Run, Little Chillun or Run Little Chillun is a folk opera written by Hall Johnson. According to James Vernon Hatch and Leo Hamalian, it is one of the most successful musical dramas of the Harlem Renaissance. It was the first Broadway show directed by an African-American.

== Development ==
Run, Little Chillun or Run Little Chillun (the original score did not include the comma) is a folk opera play, or musical drama, written by Hall Johnson. The script was first published in 1996.

== Plot ==
The play contrasts pagan and Christian religious traditions among Blacks in the American South.

Run Little Chillun’ recounts the story of Jim Jones, son of a minister of the New Hope Baptist church. He is seduced by Sulamai, a beautiful woman from the New Day Pilgrims, an Afro-Caribbean "cult" that (in Johnson's words) finds God manifest through nature, defines sin as "a sense of guilt inculcated through wrong education," and views the human body not as "an object for shame or concealment," but as the "branches of a beautiful, fruitful tree". (Run Little Chillun’ 1939; Simpson 2008, 189,190). Jones leaves his family and church to join the Pilgrims, but Christianity triumphs in the end; Sulamai is struck dead by lightning and Jones returns to the Baptist fold.

== Productions ==
The show premiered in 1933 on Broadway and ran for four months and 126 performances. It was revived in 1935–1937 by the Federal Theater Project and ran for two years in Los Angeles. It was directed by Clarence Edouard Muse. It was produced in 1939 in San Francisco at the Golden Gate International Exposition. In 1943 it was revived on Broadway at the Hudson Theatre featuring Rosalie King, P. Jay Sidney, Charles Holland (singer), Myrtle Anderson, Edna Mae Harris, Helen Dowdy, Eloise C. Uggams, Gertrude Saunders and Maude Simmons. It was the first Broadway show with an African-American director, the first with an African-American composer, and the first African-American folk opera on Broadway.

== Reception ==
Hatch and Hamalian called it "buoyant in spirit" and said it is considered one of the most successful musical dramas of the Harlem Renaissance. Kenneth Burke said the play allowed audiences to see how American Blacks had survived in a culture of oppression. According to Eileen Southern, "the outstanding quality of the play was its music, particularly in two spectacular scenes—a revival meeting and a pagan religious orgy."
