= William Warfield =

American concert bass-baritone singer (1920-2002)

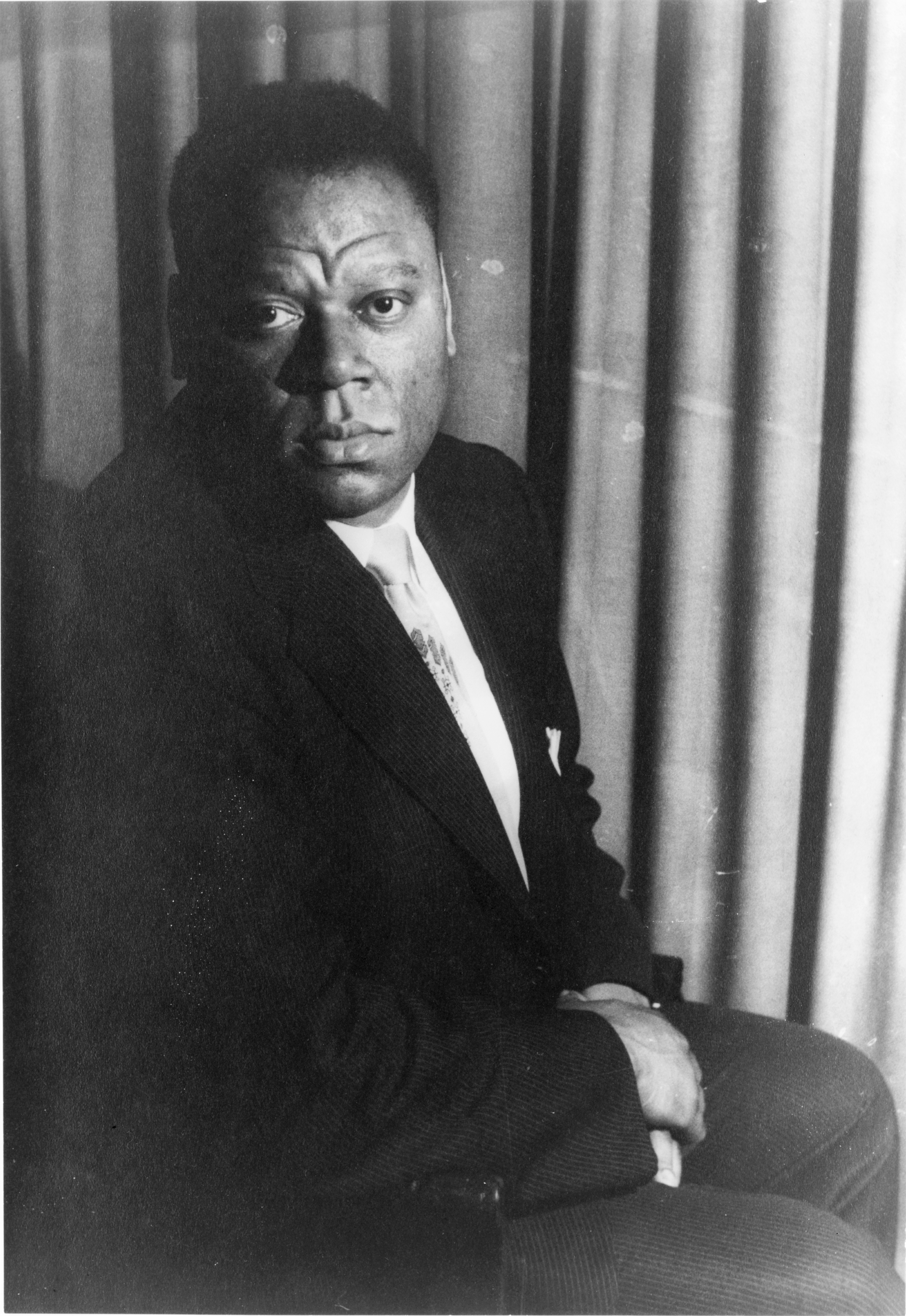
- Portrait of William Warfield by Carl Van Vechten, 1954
- Born: William Caesar Warfield; January 22, 1920; West Helena, Arkansas, U.S.
- Died: August 25, 2002 (aged 82); Chicago, Illinois, U.S.
- Education: Eastman School of Music (B.M. 1942, M.M. 1946)
- Occupation: Opera singer
- Spouse: Leontyne Price

William Caesar Warfield (January 22, 1920 – August 25, 2002) was an American concert bass-baritone, known for his appearances in stage productions, Hollywood films, and television programs. A prominent African American artist during the Civil Rights era, he worked with many notable artists, represented the United States during foreign tours, taught at academic institutions, and earned numerous accolades, including a Grammy Award in 1984.

== Biography ==
=== Early life and career ===
Warfield was born in West Helena, Arkansas, the oldest of five sons of a Baptist minister. He grew up in Rochester, New York, where his father was the pastor of Mt. Vernon Church. In 1938, as a senior at Washington High School in Rochester, he won the Music Educators National Song Competition in St. Louis and expressed an interest in pursuing a career on the concert stage. Inducted into the U.S. Army in November 1942 during World War II, Warfield, a senior at the Eastman School of Music, presented his graduation recital before an overflow audience at Kilbourn Hall, Eastman Theater on November 18. He attended his graduation ceremony the following May in military uniform. After earning his bachelor's degree in 1942 and serving in the military, he returned to the Eastman School to complete a master's degree in 1946.

According to a recent exhibit about WWII, Warfield was one of less than one hundred African American members of the Ritchie Boys, thousands of soldiers who were trained at Fort Ritchie, Maryland. It was an intelligence center where hundreds of Jewish recruits who fled Nazi Germany for the United States were trained to interrogate their one-time countrymen. According to the exhibit at the Zekelman Holocaust Memorial Center in Farmington Hills, Michigan, Warfield was brought to the camp because of his strong German skills, which he perfected while studying music. Because of segregation, his skills were never put to use.

According to Warfield, upon induction into the Army he was initially assigned to the ordnance department to be a truck driver, but after he objected, citing his language skills, he was assigned to Ft. Ritchie, where he was in charge of stage shows and spoke fluently with German, Italian and French soldiers in their native languages.

He was discharged from the Army, where he had served in military intelligence, in 1946. Later that year he was cast in the road show tour of Call Me Mister. According to Warfield, that road show cast included William Marshall, Carl Reiner, Buddy Hackett, and Bob Fosse. Over the next three years he also appeared in the play Set My People Free and the opera Regina, while also studying with Yves Tinayre and Otto Herz of the veteran's training program of the American Theatre Wing.

He gave his recital debut in New York's Town Hall on March 19, 1950. He was quickly invited by the Australian Broadcasting Corporation to tour Australia and give 35 concerts. In 1952, Warfield performed in Porgy and Bess during a tour of Europe sponsored by the U.S. State Department (he made six separate tours for the US Department of State, more than any other American solo artist). In this production, he played opposite the opera star Leontyne Price, whom he soon married, but the demands of two separate careers left them little time together. They divorced in 1973 but were featured together in a 1963 studio recording of excerpts from Porgy and Bess.

In 1969 he participated in an oratorio in Riverside Park with youth from the New York All-City High School Chorus as a public service. His dear friend and colleague Marian Anderson invited the youth to her home in Connecticut afterwards. Warfield accompanied the youth; it was the same weekend as the Woodstock Festival that some of the youth's friends went to instead.

In 1975, William was a soloist with the Naumburg Orchestral Concerts, in the Naumburg Bandshell, Central Park, in the summer series. That same year he accepted an appointment as professor of music at the University of Illinois at Urbana-Champaign. He later became chairman of the Voice Department. In 1994, he moved to Northwestern University's School of Music, where he stayed until his death.

External audio
- You may hear William Warfield with Aaron Copland conducting the Columbia Symphony Orchestra in Copland's "Old American Songs" in 1963 Here on Archive.org

He sang the premiere performances of the version for soloist and orchestra of Set I of Aaron Copland's Old American Songs in 1955, and of the version for soloist and piano of Set II of the collection in 1958. (He also recorded both sets of the songs.) His vocal talents were also featured on two recordings of Handel's "Messiah" – a classic, but heavily cut, performance by the Philadelphia Orchestra under the direction of Eugene Ormandy (released in 1959) and a lesser-known, drastically restructured recording made in 1956, also heavily cut, with Leonard Bernstein and the New York Philharmonic. Bernstein combined the Christmas and Resurrection sections and ended with the arias and choruses depicting the death of Jesus. The Ormandy recording featured the Mormon Tabernacle Choir, and Bernstein's the Westminster Choir.

Warfield was also accomplished in acting and poetry recitation. He played the character "The Lord" in a celebrated Hallmark Hall of Fame television production of "The Green Pastures", a role he played twice on live TV (both versions survive as kinescopes). He appeared in two Hollywood films, including a star-making performance as Joe in Metro-Goldwyn-Mayer's 1951 Technicolor remake of Show Boat. His other film was called Old Explorers (1990), starring James Whitmore and José Ferrer. In a nod to Show Boat, Warfield played a cameo role as a tugboat captain. Footage of Warfield in Show Boat has been included in several TV shows and/or films, notably That's Entertainment!. Warfield played his Show Boat role in two other productions of the musical – the 1966 Lincoln Center production and a 1972 production in Vienna. He sang "Ol' Man River" in three different record albums of the show – the 1951 motion picture soundtrack album on MGM Records, a 1962 studio album featuring Barbara Cook and John Raitt on Columbia Masterworks, and the RCA Victor album made from the Lincoln Center production.

He made an appearance on The Colgate Comedy Hour and on a program called TV Recital Hall in 1951, the same year that he made his screen debut in Show Boat. He later appeared on The Ed Sullivan Show in 1955. In 1961, he appeared as a recital soloist on an episode of the Young People's Concerts, conducted by Leonard Bernstein. In March 1984 he was the winner of a Grammy Award in the Spoken Word category for his outstanding narration of Aaron Copland's Lincoln Portrait, accompanied by the Eastman Philharmonia . And in the 1990s, he narrated a special jazz arrangement of music from Show Boat, on the PRI program Riverwalk Jazz. In 1999, Warfield joined baritones Robert Sims and Benjamin Matthews in a trio by the name of "Three Generations". Managed by Arthur White, this ensemble toured the United States giving full concerts of African-American spirituals and folk songs until Warfield's death in 2002.

=== Decline and death ===
Beginning in 1962, Warfield began to have trouble with his voice, a situation he described in his autobiography. By 1966 his voice had deepened from bass-baritone to a full-fledged bass, and he could not sing the climactic high note on Ol' Man River as easily as he had in the 1951 film version. To compensate he had to sing even more expressively than he had before.

By 1976, Warfield, although still making various stage and television appearances, was not singing as much as he had in the past. He served as narrator in various orchestral works, such as Aaron Copland's Lincoln Portrait, and occasionally performed sprechstimme roles in works by Arnold Schoenberg. In the summer of 1976, he reprised his role as Porgy in a Lake George Opera Festival production of Porgy and Bess. Despite his issues, he did sing on occasion during his final years, despite the fact that by then his singing voice was practically gone. In those years, when he sang "Ol' Man River", he would not perform it with the original lyrics, but with the altered ones that Paul Robeson used in his recitals beginning in 1938.

Warfield died in Chicago in August 2002, following treatment at Northwestern Memorial Hospital, succumbing to neck injuries he sustained from a fall a month prior.

== Membership of organizations ==
Warfield was active in many organizations, after appearing as the featured artist at the 50th year convention of the National Association of Negro Musicians , he became active with the organization, serving as its president for two terms. He later served on the boards of the NANM and the Schiller Institute. After joining the Schiller Institute in 1996, he began to collaborate with acclaimed vocal coach Sylvia Olden Lee in a project to save the performance tradition of the Negro spiritual. During the final years of his life, from 1999 to 2002, he performed regularly at Schiller Institute biannual conferences, often with Olden Lee as his accompanist, and the two of them traveled the country conducting singing workshops for members of the LaRouche Youth Movement. Warfield was made an honorary member of the Delta Lambda chapter of Phi Mu Alpha Sinfonia at Ball State University in 1961, and awarded the Fraternity's Charles E. Lutton Man of Music Award in 1976 at its national convention in Evansville, Indiana.

== Legacy ==
The William Warfield Scholarship Fund was formed in 1977 to support young African American classical singers at the Eastman School of Music. His nephew, Thomas Warfield, has presided over the fund. Recipients include Claron McFadden and Nicole Cabell.
