= The Green Pastures (play) =

1929 play by Marc Connelly

First edition

The Green Pastures is a play written in 1929 by Marc Connelly adapted from Ol' Man Adam an' His Chillun (1928), a collection of stories written by Roark Bradford. The play was the winner of the Pulitzer Prize for Drama in 1930. It had the first all-black Broadway cast. The play and the film adaptation were generally well received and hailed by white drama and film critics. African-American intellectuals, cultural critics, and audiences were more critical of white author Connelly's claim to be presenting an authentic view of black religious thought.

The play portrays episodes from the Old Testament as seen through the eyes of a young African-American child in the Great Depression-era Southern United States, who interprets the Bible in terms familiar to her. Following Bradford's lead, Connelly set the biblical stories in New Orleans and in an all-black context. He diverged from Bradford's work, however, in enlarging the role of the character "De Lawd" (God), played on stage by Richard B. Harrison (1864–1935), with Charles Winter Wood as his understudy. The Green Pastures also featured numerous African-American spirituals arranged by Hall Johnson and performed by The Hall Johnson Choir. The cast also included singer Mabel Ridley.The chorus included torch singer Eva Sylvester and members of the Sylvester family as cherubs.

== Adaptations ==
Connelly later collaborated with William Keighley in directing a Hollywood film adaptation of the play, which was made in 1936, starring Rex Ingram as "De Lawd". At the time, the film caused some controversy. It was banned in Australia, Finland, and Hungary on the grounds that it was "blasphemous" to portray Biblical characters in this way.

The play was adapted for television, and presented twice during the days of live TV on the Hallmark Hall of Fame in 1957 and 1959. Both productions starred William Warfield as "De Lawd", in the largest dramatic acting role he ever had on television.

In the UK, a radio adaptation by Roy Lockwood was produced from New York in October 1945. A UK television version was broadcast by BBC Television in the BBC Sunday-Night Theatre series on 14 September 1958, produced by Eric Fawcett and starring William Marshall as De Lawd.
