= Roark Bradford =

American novelist

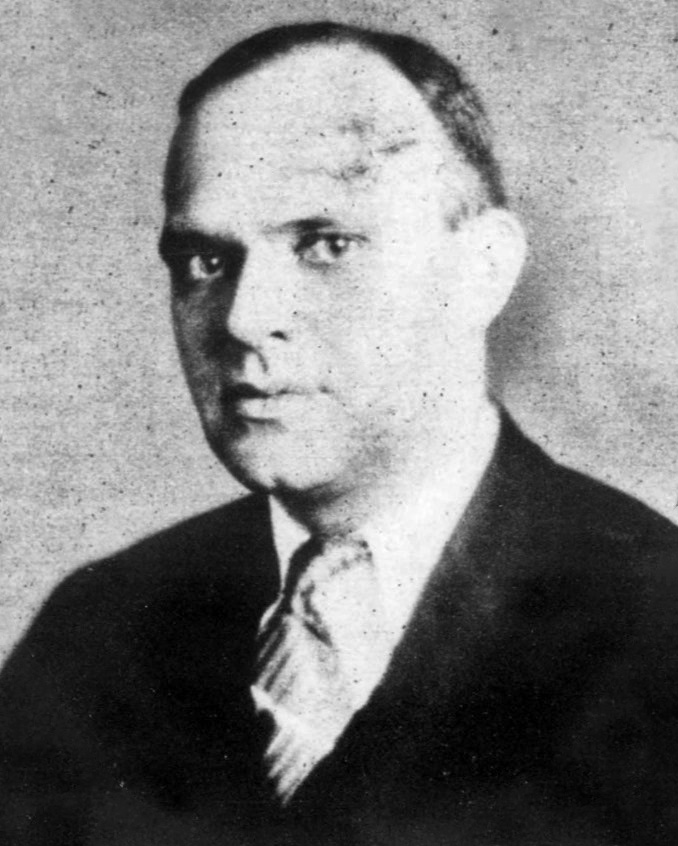
- Bradford around 1928
- Born: Roark Whitney Wickliffe Bradford; August 21, 1896; Lauderdale County, Tennessee
- Died: November 13, 1948 (aged 52); New Orleans, Louisiana
- Education: University of California, Berkeley
- Occupation: writer
- Spouse(s): Lydia Sehorn, Mary Rose Sciarra Himler

Roark Whitney Wickliffe Bradford (August 21, 1896 – November 13, 1948) was an American short story writer and novelist.

== Life ==
Bradford moved from a Tennessee plantation to Cabot, Arkansas in 1910. He attended University of California, Berkeley, and served as a first lieutenant in the Coast Artillery during World War I. He claims to have grown up on a plantation where he acquired intimate knowledge of African Americans—whom he described in three different types, a description denounced by Sterling Allen Brown as simply perpetuating racist stereotypes.

He married Lydia Sehorn, divorcing her in July 1933 after having only son Richard Bradford. He then married Mary Rose Sciarra Himler, also a writer, in Carlsbad, New Mexico. He was night city editor for the New Orleans Times-Picayune.

Bradford continued to produce well-received work during the 1930s and early 1940s. He served in the U.S. Naval Reserve Bureau of Aeronautics Training during World War II. In 1946, he accepted a position as visiting lecturer in the English department at Tulane University in New Orleans.

On November 13, 1948, he died of amoebiasis, believed to have been contracted while he was stationed in French West Africa in 1943. His cremated remains were spread over the waters of the Mississippi River.

"At the time of his death, Bradford's writings were very popular. Since the 1940s, however, much of his body of work has been reevaluated. Many criticize his work as patronizing and demeaning in its portrayal of Black characters."

Marc Connelly adapted Ol' Man Adam and his Chillun for the stage as The Green Pastures, which won a Pulitzer Prize.

His stage adaption of John Henry appeared in New York City in 1940.

His work appeared in Collier's, Harper's, and Virginia Quarterly Review,

== Awards ==
- 1927 O. Henry Award

== Works ==
- Ol' Man Adam an' His Chillun. Harper & Row. 1928.
- This Side of Jordan. Harper & brothers. 1929.
- How Come Christmas 1930, reprinted Harpers & Brothers, 1948 (reprint. Cherokee Pub. 1987. ISBN 978-0-87797-208-2.
- Ol' King David an' the Philistine Boys. Harper & Brothers. 1930.
- John Henry 1931 Reprint Steven Carl Tracy, ed. (2008). John Henry: Roark Bradford's novel and play. Oxford University Press. ISBN 978-0-19-537104-8.
- Kingdom coming. Harper & Brothers. 1933.
- Let the Band Play Dixie 1934 (reprint. Books for Libraries Press. 1970. ISBN 978-0-8369-3612-4.)
- The Three-Headed Angel. Harper & brothers. 1937.
- The Green Room, Harper & Brothers, 1949
- Harold Courlander, ed. (2003). "The Birth of John Henry". A treasury of Afro-American folklore. Marlowe & Company. ISBN 978-1-56924-501-9.
- M. Thomas Inge, ed. (1999). "The Private World of William Faulkner". Conversations with William Faulkner. University Press of Mississippi. ISBN 978-1-57806-136-5.
