= Eva Jessye =

American singer and conductor (1895–1992)

Eva A. Jessye
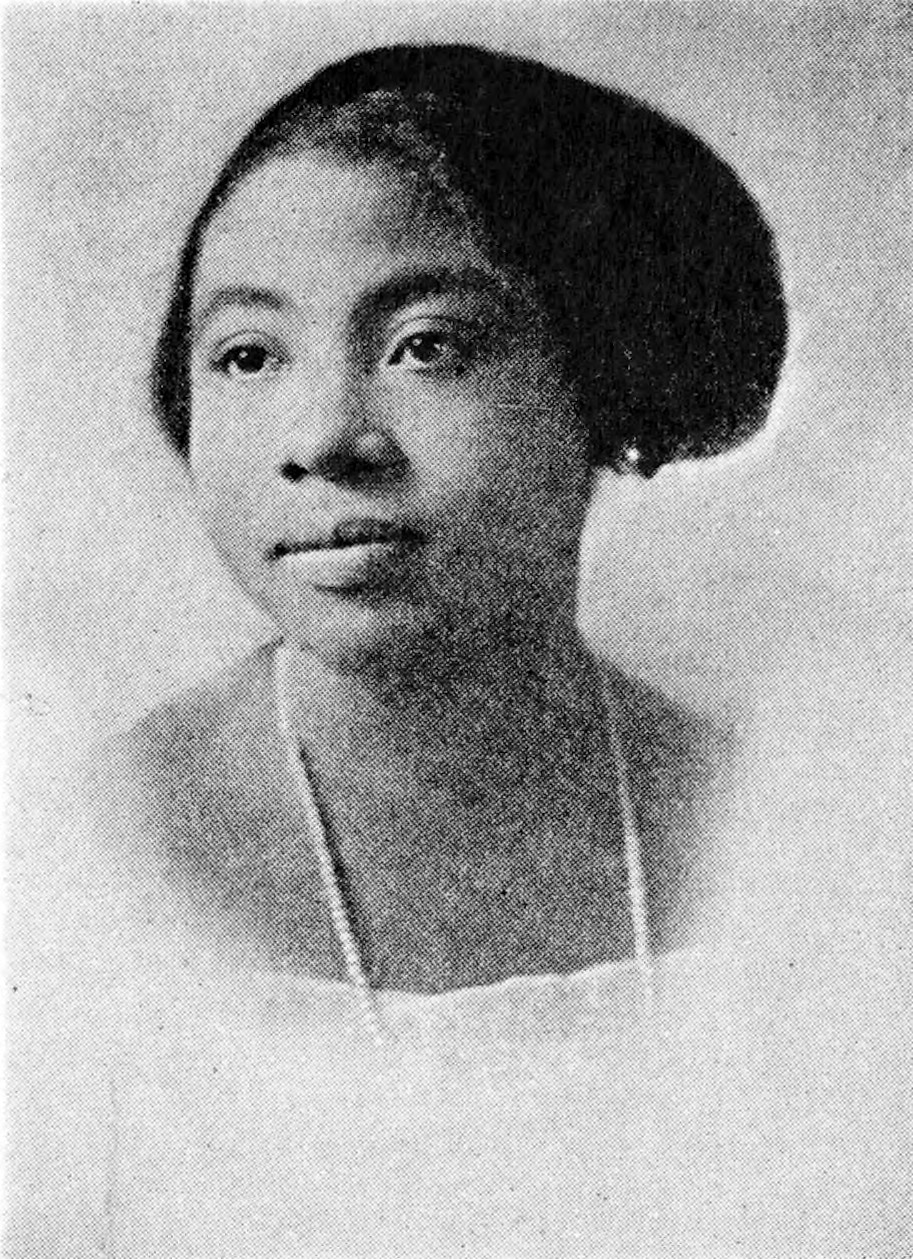
- Jessye from a 1923 publication
- Born: January 20, 1895; Coffeyville, Kansas, U.S.
- Died: February 21, 1992 (aged 97); Ann Arbor, Michigan, U.S.
- Known for: Choral conductor

Eva Jessye (January 20, 1895 – February 21, 1992) was an American conductor and composer who was the first black woman to receive international distinction as a professional choral conductor. She is notable as a choral conductor during the Harlem Renaissance. She created her own choral group which featured widely in performance. Her professional influence extended for decades through her teaching as well.

Her accomplishments in this field were historic for any woman. She collaborated in productions of groundbreaking works, directing her choir and working with Virgil Thomson and Gertrude Stein on Four Saints in Three Acts (1933), and serving as musical director with George Gershwin on his innovative opera Porgy and Bess (1935).

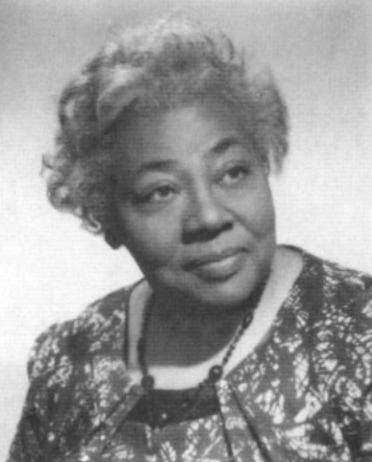
Jessye was the first black woman to receive international distinction as a professional choral conductor

== Early life and education ==
Eva Jessye was born January 20, 1895, in Coffeyville, Kansas. She spent much of her childhood between Kansas and Washington State, where her mother, Julia, lived after separating from Jessye's father, Albert. She took piano lessons as a child, sang with her great aunt, and heard spirituals in her childhood church.

In Kansas, her father worked at a chicken house. He died when she was around seven years old. After his death, Jessye moved to Seattle to live with her mother, but she returned to Coffeyville again at age nine to live with her great grandmother. Unfortunately she was not allowed to attend high school due to racial barriers, so instead, at age 13 she enrolled in the Quindaro State School for the Colored (now Western University). There, studied privately with Will Marion Cook, composer of the first black musical comedy sketch. This encounter led her to decide to be a musician for the rest of her life.

After graduating high school, she attended Langston University in Oklahoma. There she received her bachelor's degree and teaching certificate.

== Career ==
Jessye taught in public schools before becoming the choir director at Morgan College in Baltimore (now called Morgan State University) in Baltimore in 1920. She returned west for a time to teach at an African Methodist Episcopal Church school in Oklahoma.

=== The Eva Jessye Choir ===
In 1926, she went back east to Baltimore, where she began to perform regularly with her group, the "Eva Jessye Choir". She had first named them the "Original Dixie Jubilee Singers", but many groups began to appropriate the name, Dixie Jubilee Singers, so she changed hers.

She and the group moved to New York, where they appeared frequently in the stage show at the Capitol Theatre, where Eugene Ormandy conducted the orchestra. In the 1920s, the group was singing work songs, spirituals, and convict songs such as "Water Boy," "I got two wings," and "Goin' to see my Sarah."

The choir recorded on Brunswick, Columbia, and Cameo records in the 1920s. The choir was also frequent performers on NBC and WOR radio in New York in the 1920s and 1930s.

The choir disbanded in 1970.

=== Creative productions ===
In 1929, Jessye went to Hollywood as the choral director for the MGM film Hallelujah, which had an all-black cast directed by King Vidor. It holds significance as one of the first motion pictures based on African-American life. She received praise from members of the black press when she spoke out against the discriminatory practices that she endured while on the set for this film.

In New York, Jessye worked with creative multi-racial teams in groundbreaking productions that experimented with form, music and stories. In 1934, she directed her choir in Virgil Thomson's and Gertrude Stein's opera, Four Saints in Three Acts, produced as a Broadway theatre work. According to Steven Watson, the Eva Jessye Choir's participation in Four Saints, represented a musical and economic breakthrough for African-American singers at the time because it was the first Broadway musical where black actors were participating in something that was not specifically about black life.

Watson quotes Jessye, describing Four Saints as "quite a departure, because up to that time, the only opportunities involved things like 'Swanee River', or 'That's Why Darkies Are Born', or 'Old Black Joe'. They called that 'our music', and thought we could sing those things only by the gift of God, and if God hadn't given us that gift, we wouldn't have any at all ... With this opera, we had to step on fresh ground, something foreign to our nature completely."

Jessye also demanded that her singers be paid for rehearsal, "fighting a deeply ingrained system of discriminatory salaries, rampant kickbacks, and nonpayment of choruses during rehearsals", writes Watson.

During the Depression, Jessye was a published poet, and, according to Jessye, she wrote what she believed may have been the first commercial with a jingle. In this singing commercial for Van Heusen collars, the text was, "It won't wrinkle. It won't crinkle. It won't irritate or chafe. When you wear that Van Heusen, you're absolutely safe."

Jessye credited radio exposure for the growth of her career. As one of the earliest people connected to CBS, she said radio was "the vehicle by which I arrived."

In 1935, George Gershwin chose her as his music director for his opera Porgy and Bess. She toured with Porgy up through the middle of the 1960s. The tours took her around the US, Europe, and Israel.

When the Eva Jessye Choir disbanded in the 1970s, Jessye then started working as a choral consultant, guest conductor, artist in residence, and lecturer at universities. This career pivot also included acting, and she was featured in films such as Black Like Me, Slaves, and Cotton Comes to Town.

=== Activism ===
An active supporter of the civil rights movement, Jessye and her choir participated in the 1963 March on Washington for Jobs and Freedom.

=== Late career ===
Active into her 80s, she taught at Pittsburg State University (Pittsburg, Kansas), and the University of Michigan. She donated her extensive collection of books, scores, artwork, and other materials to the University of Michigan, which became the basis of the university's African American Music Collection. Dr. Jessye was a member of Sigma Gamma Rho sorority.

== Works ==
In 1927, Jessye published My Spirituals, a collection of her arrangements of spirituals, together with stories about growing up in southeast Kansas.

Jessye also composed her own choral works:

- The Life of Christ in Negro Spirituals (1931);
- Paradise Lost and Regained (1934), a folk oratorio; and
- The Chronicle of Job (1936).

These are combined spirituals, religious narrative or biblical text, and her orchestral compositions.

== Legacy and honors ==
Shortly before her death in Ann Arbor, Michigan, she established the Eva Jessye African-American Music Collection at the University of Michigan. She left most of her personal papers to Pittsburg State University in Kansas.
