= Ajax (Francis Freeman) =

Marvel Comics character

Francis Freeman Ajax
- Ajax as depicted in Deadpool vs. Thanos #1 (September 2015). Art by Elmo Bondoc (penciler/inker) and Ruth Redmond (colorist).

Publication information
- Publisher: Marvel Comics
- First appearance: Deadpool #14 (March 1998)
- Created by: Joe Kelly; Walter A. McDaniel

In-story information
- Alter ego: Francis Freeman
- Species: Human mutate
- Team affiliations: Weapon X
- Notable aliases: The Attending; Ajax; Abyss Man
- Abilities: Enhanced strength; Intuitive capacity; Via implants: Superhuman speed, reflexes and agility; High tolerance to pain

Francis Freeman, also known as Ajax, is a supervillain appearing in American comic books published by Marvel Comics. Created by writer Joe Kelly and artist Walter A. McDaniel, the character first appeared in Deadpool #14 (March 1998).

Ed Skrein portrayed Freeman in the 2016 film Deadpool.

== Fictional character biography ==
Francis Freeman is the former enforcer at Emrys Killebrew's laboratory, known as the Workshop. He possesses enhanced strength and intuitive capability, as well as subcutaneous implants that give him superhuman speed and agility.

Having grown annoyed with his test subject Wade Wilson, Killebrew allows Freeman to kill him. Freeman removes Wilson's heart, but his healing factor activates and regenerates his heart. The entire series of events costs Wilson his sanity. As Deadpool, he hunts down and seemingly kills Freeman.

Freeman resurfaces years later using the codename of Ajax. He hunts down and kills many of the surviving members of Weapon X to exact revenge on Deadpool. Ajax punches Deadpool off a cliff, but he survives. Deadpool has Ajax plunge them both into a lake, short-circuiting Ajax's armor and enabling Deadpool to kill him by snapping his neck.

Blackheart releases Ajax from Hell in an attempt to prevent Deadpool and Thanos from meddling in his plot to overthrow Mephisto. Ajax, now calling himself Abyss Man, locates and attempts to kill the pair, but the duo subdue him and turn him into a gateway to Hell with the help of Black Talon.

== Powers and abilities ==
Francis has enhanced strength and intuitive capacity, as a result of genetic modifications by Killebrew. After receiving implants, he gained superhuman speed and agility. His nerves were also removed to increase his tolerance for pain.

== In other media ==
Francis Freeman / Ajax appears in Deadpool (2016), portrayed by Ed Skrein. According to co-writer Rhett Reese, the character was selected to serve as the film's antagonist due to his "sadistic quality and his imperviousness to pain and what that implied about him" which "lands very hard on Wade Wilson and creates the fun antagonism". This version tortured Wade Wilson to activate his mutant genes and sell him as a slave. However, Wade escapes and seeks revenge after being disfigured. After Wade corners and injures him, Freeman escapes when Colossus and Negasonic Teenage Warhead intervene and distract his attacker. He and his partner Angel Dust later retaliate by kidnapping Wade's girlfriend Vanessa Carlysle. Wade, Colossus, and Negasonic Teenage Warhead confront Freeman, Angel Dust, and their team in a scrapyard, where Wade kills Freeman.
