= Angel dust =

Angel dust may refer to:

== Common uses ==
- Phencyclidine (PCP), a street drug
- Angel dusting, a misleading marketing practice

== Comics and videos ==
- Angel Dust, a manga by Kouta Hirano
- Angel/Dust, a 2000 manga by Aoi Nanase

== Fictional characters ==
- Angel Dust (comics), a fictional mutant
- Angel Dust (Hazbin Hotel), an anthropomorphic spider in the adult animated series Hazbin Hotel

== Films ==
- Angel Dust (film), 1994, by Japanese director Gakuryū Ishii

== Music ==
=== Performers ===
- Angel Dust (German band), a German heavy metal band
- Angel Dust (American band), an American rock supergroup
- Angeldust (band), an American industrial music project

=== Albums ===
- Angel Dust (Faith No More album)
- Angel Dust (Blutengel album)
- Angel Dust (Indo G album), 1998
- Angel Dust (Z-Ro album), 2012

=== Songs ===
- "Angel Dust", a song by Tim Scott
- "Angel Dust", a song by Gil Scott-Heron and Brian Jackson from the 1978 album Secrets
- "Angel Dust", a song by Venom from the 1981 album Welcome to Hell
- "Angel Dust", a song by Loudness on the 1982 album Devil Soldier
- "Angel Dust", a song by New Order on the 1986 album Brotherhood
- "Angel Dust", a song by Mac Miller from the 2014 mixtape Faces
- "angeldust", a song by Lil Peep from the 2015 mixtape Live Forever

== See also ==
- Dust of Angels, a 1992 film
