= Serovera =

Serovera is a nutritional supplement marketed by TeamTrade, Inc. As of October 2022, Serovera products were formulated to support immune and digestive health. It is sold at retailers as well as through direct Internet marketing.

Currently sold in the United States, Serovera contains the stabilized and isolated agent aloe mucilaginous polysaccharide. Like many nutraceuticals, its efficacy is questionable.
