= Cosmetics advertising =

Promotion of cosmetics and beauty products

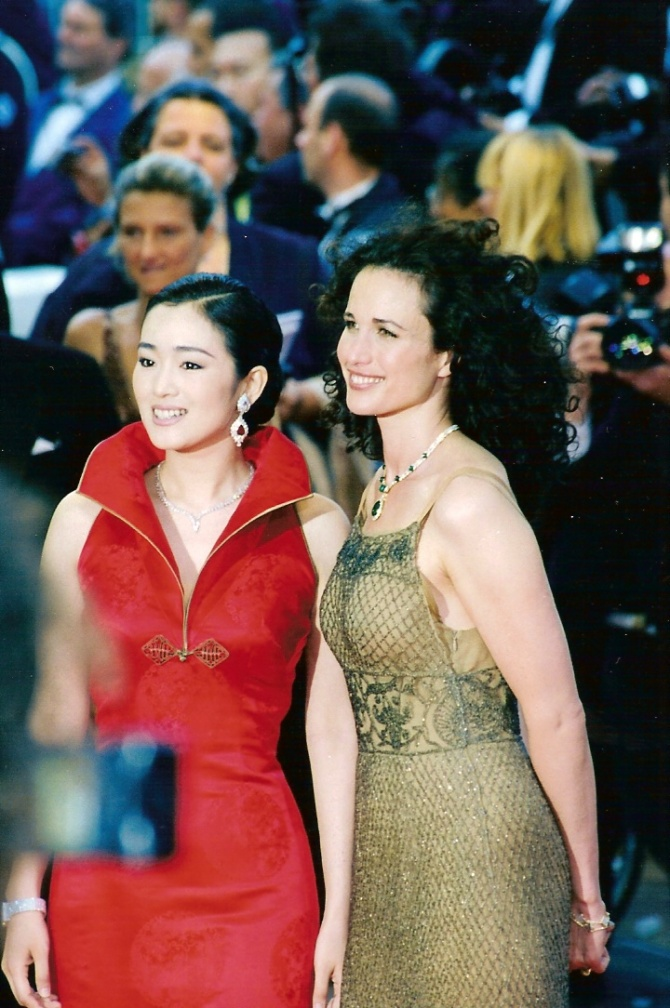
Actresses Gong Li and Andie MacDowell have both appeared in many advertisements for L'Oréal.

Cosmetic advertising is the promotion of cosmetics and beauty products by the cosmetics industry through a variety of media. The advertising campaigns are usually aimed at women wishing to improve their appearance, commonly to increase physical attractiveness and reduce the signs of ageing.

== Persuasion ==
The beauty industry relies on all kinds of persuasion techniques to sell products. Celebrities help to build brand awareness through promoting products as consumers believe the product is used by the celebrity and this can affect consumer's decision making. This philosophy is often the impetus behind advertisements for makeup, skin products, and hair products. This causes consumers to spend extra money on items that might not be suitable or workable on themselves.

Beauty product advertising promises to consumers that certain products can make consumers look younger. Beauty advertising often seeks to convince consumers of the product's value or even its necessity for the consumer's well-being and self-image.

The effectiveness of advertising depends on convincing consumers that the product can improve their appearance. They may use different methods to persuade individuals to make purchases. Association can be a powerful tool, as well as incentives like discounts. As many people are aware that their personal appearance can have a significant effect on how they are treated by others, advertising can use these concerns by encouraging the target market to buy products.

Beauty advertising often has little to do with selling the product, but rather selling the concepts of beauty and self-esteem.

== Criticism ==
Many campaigns have come under fire through their alleged use of pseudoscience and their promotion of unrealistic goals. Moreover, many campaigns are accused of inducing eating disorders, or leading to destructive plastic surgery practices.

In addition, cosmetic advertising is often accused of excessively using photo manipulation to enhance the appearance of models, instead of using the cosmetics themselves, creating an unrealistic image of the product's benefits.

Cosmetics are a major expenditure for many women, with the cosmetics industry grossing around 7 billion dollars a year, according to a 2008 YWCA report. Cosmetic retailers design advertising to alter women's attitudes toward cosmetics, encouraging them to buy more products. Many advertisers shape this attitude by encouraging women to feel dissatisfied with their appearance. According to sociologist, Jean Kilbourne, adolescents are particularly vulnerable because they are new and inexperienced consumers and are the prime targets of many advertisements. Study after study has proven that repeated exposure to ideal beauty as portrayed by the media causes detrimental psychological effects in children and adolescents ranging from distorted body images and lowered self-esteem to eating disorders and steroid use.

This thin ideal represents less than 5% of the American population leaving 95% of females with a beauty norm that is impossible to meet. Not only is it impossible to meet, but the model in the advertisement has often been photo manipulated. The flawlessness of advertising woman is, in fact, an illusion created by makeup artists, photographers, and photo re-touchers. Each image is painstakingly worked over: teeth and eyeballs are bleached white; blemishes, wrinkles, and stray hairs are airbrushed away. Media images convey normative information as to what an attractive body looks like that prompts women to evaluate their own body against this normative standard.

Beauty standards are essentially societal norms or expectations that are used to define a very specific idea of what should be considered beautiful and not conforming to society’s beauty standards can have detrimental effects on a person’s sense of worth. Researchers have found a correlation between exposure to cosmetic advertisements and body image issues among black women. For example, cosmetic companies tend to glorify euro-centric characteristics over other physical features and this leaves people who lack these traits extremely self-conscious. Matter of fact, an experiment discovered there was a correlation between the likelihood of women undergoing cosmetic surgery based on their body dissatisfaction before and after experiencing some form of cosmetic advertisement. The results supported the hypothesis that mental health issues, such as depression and anxiety, are more common among women who have undergone cosmetic surgery than their non-patient counterparts.

Cosmetics advertising can be detrimental not only to mental health, but physical health as well. When advertised incorrectly, people can be influenced to purchase products that are actually harming their skin more than benefiting. Most, but not all, cosmetics can cause harmful reactions to the skin due to the toxic chemicals they contain.

Another significant challenge associated with the marketing of cosmetics is that manufacturers sell products as cosmetics which should actually be subject to different registration requirements and legislation. Such products are sometimes referred to as "borderline products". In Europe, there are also instances where the relevant authorities enforce a change in a product’s registration (e.g. from a cosmetic to a medicinal product, or from a food supplement to a cosmetic). These issues are nothing new, as courts were already conducting cases concerning borderline products as early as the beginning of the 20th century.

== See also ==
- Sex in advertising
- Angel dusting
- Cosmeceutical
