= False advertising =

Misleading content in advertisements

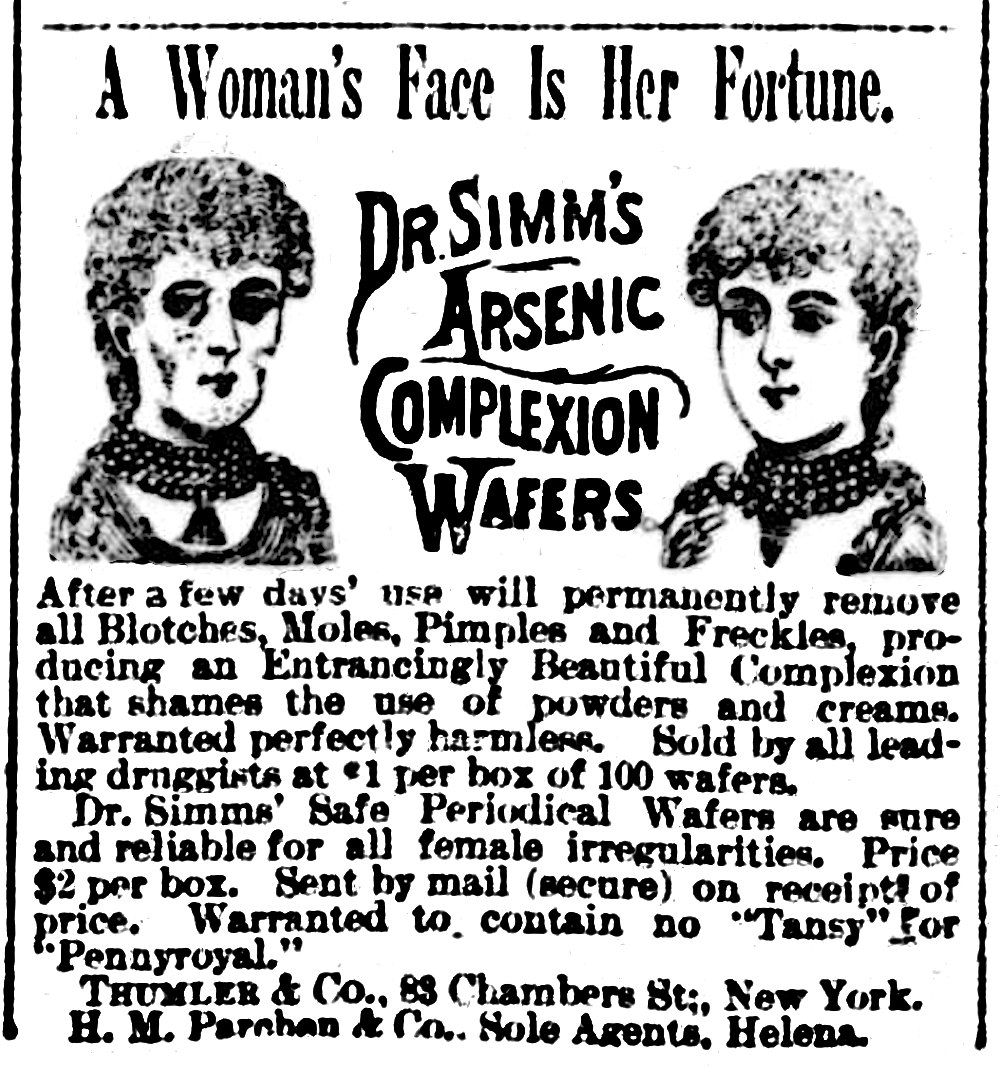
An 1889 newspaper advertisement for "perfectly harmless" arsenic complexion wafers (app. lacking tansy and pennyroyal herbs) claims that "After a few days' use will permanently remove all Blotches, Moles, Pimples, and Freckles". Arsenic was known to be poisonous.

False advertising is the act of publishing, transmitting, distributing or otherwise publicly circulating an advertisement containing a false claim or statement, to promote the sale of property, goods or services. A false advertisement can be classified as deceptive if the advertiser deliberately misleads the consumer, rather than making an unintentional mistake. A number of governments use regulations or other laws and methods to limit false advertising.

== Types of deception ==
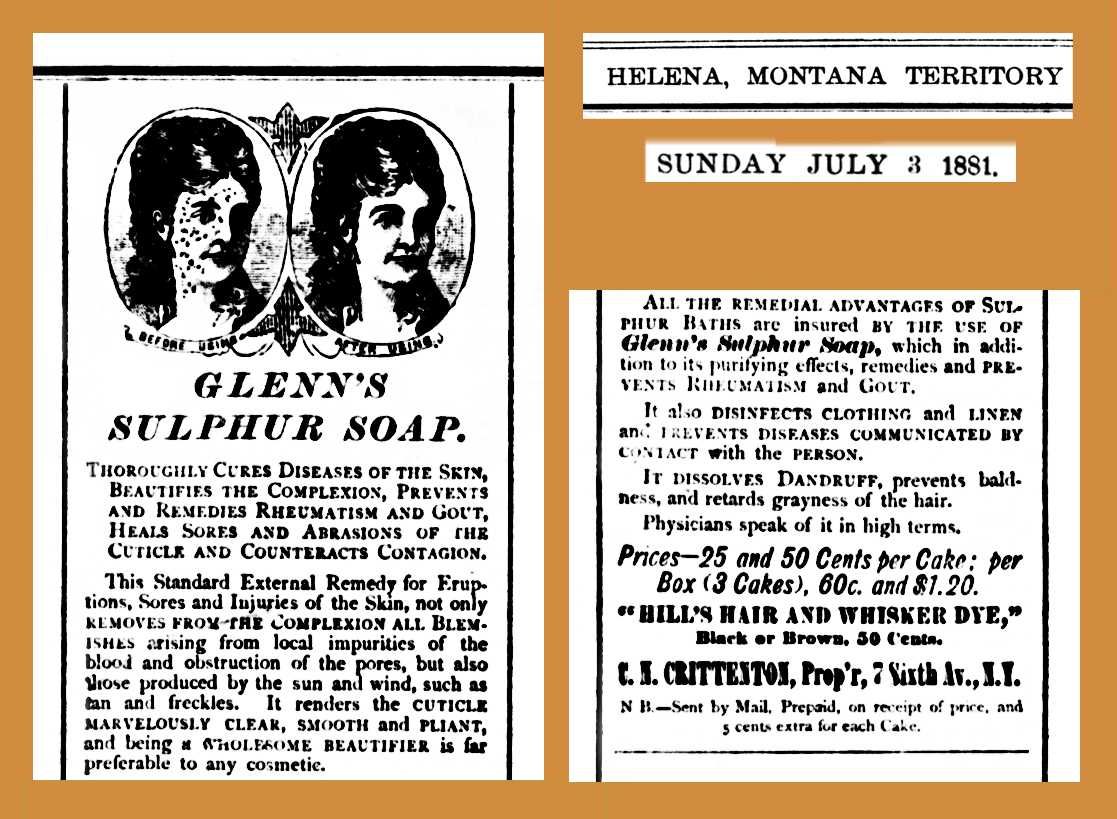
Sulfur, with known antifungal, antibacterial and keratolytic activity, was used for acne vulgaris, rosacea, seborrheic dermatitis, dandruff, pityriasis versicolor, scabies and warts. This 1881 advertisement claimed efficacy against rheumatism, gout, baldness and gray hair.

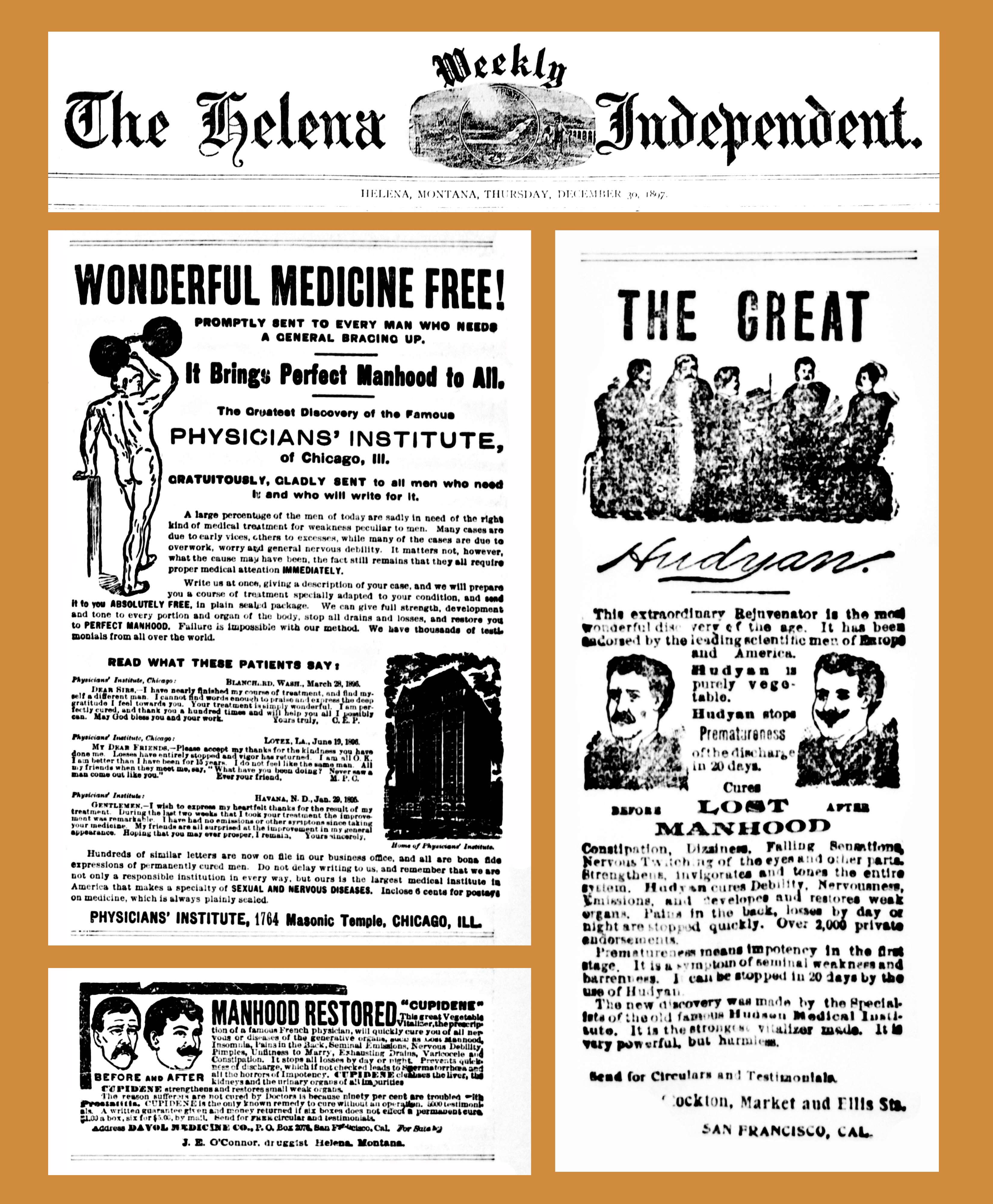
Three male-sexual-function advertisements in an 1897 newspaper. One claims to restore "perfect manhood. Failure is impossible with our method". Another "will quickly cure you of all nervous or diseases of the generative organs, such as Lost Manhood, Insomnia, Pains in the Back, Seminal Emissions, Nervous Debility, Pimples, Unfitness to Marry, Exhausting Drains, Varicocele and Constipation".

False advertising can take one of two broad forms: an advertisement that may be factually wrong, or intentionally misleading. Both the types of false advertising may be presented in a number of ways.

=== Photo manipulation ===
Photo manipulation is a technique often used in the cosmetics field and for weight loss commercials to advertise false (or non-typical) results and give consumers a false impression of a product's capabilities. Photo manipulation can alter the audience's perception of a product's effectiveness; for example, makeup advertisements may use airbrushed photos. Another example is using darkroom exposure techniques, darkening and lightening photographs. Some manipulation techniques are praised for the impressive artwork, whereas others are looked down upon, especially in cases where others are deceived.

=== Hidden fees and surcharges ===
Hidden fees can be a way for companies to trick unwary consumers into paying more for a product which was advertised at a specific price to increase profits without raising the price of the product. The Fine print may be used to obscure fees and surcharges in advertising. Another way to hide fees is to exclude shipping costs when listing the price of goods online, making an item look less expensive than it actually is. A number of hotels charge resort fees, which are not typically included in the advertised price of a room.

=== Fillers and oversized packaging ===
Some products are sold with fillers, which increases the legal weight of a product with something that costs the producer very little compared to what the consumer thinks they are buying. Some food advertisements use this technique in products such as meat, which can be injected with broth or brine (up to 15 percent), or TV dinners filled with gravy (or other sauce) instead of meat. Malt and ham have been used as filler in peanut butter. Non-meat fillers may be high in carbohydrates and low in nutritional value; one example is a cereal binder, which usually contains flour and oatmeal. Some products may come in a large container which is mostly empty, leading a consumer to believe that the total amount of food is greater than it is.

=== Falsifying quality and origin ===
Another form of deceptive advertising falsifies the quality or origin of a product. If an advertiser shows a product with a certain quality but knows the product has defects or is not of the same quality, they are falsely advertising the product. Producers may misrepresent where a product is manufactured, saying (for example) that it was produced in the United States when it was produced in another country.

=== Misleading health claims ===
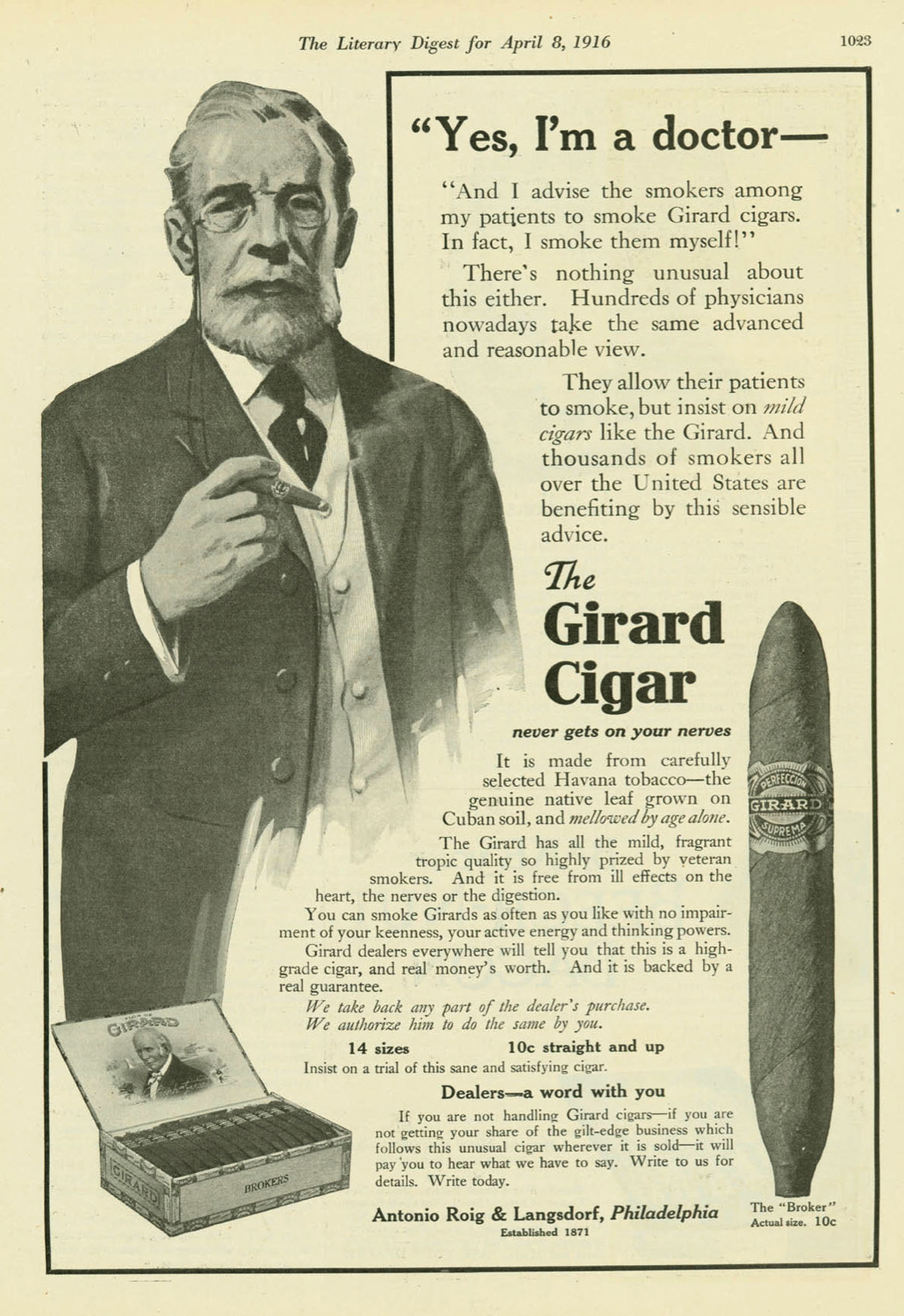
A 1916 ad showing a fictional doctor endorsing a cigar brand. At the time, it was considered a breach of medical ethics to advertise; doctors who did so would risk losing their license.

The labels "diet," "low fat," "sugar-free," "healthy" and "good for you" are often associated with products which claim to improve health. Advertisers, aware of consumer desire to live healthier and longer, describe their products accordingly. Food advertising influences consumer preferences and shopping habits. Highlighting certain ingredients may mislead consumers into thinking they are buying healthy products when, in fact, they are not. Dannon's Activia yogurt was advertised as scientifically proven to boost the immune system, and was sold at a much higher price. The company was ordered to pay $45 million in damages to consumers after a lawsuit.

Food companies may end up in court for using misleading tactics such as:

- Using a "tick panel" above a nutritional label, with a large, bold font and brighter colors
- Highlighting one healthy ingredient on the front of a package with a large check mark (a "tick") next to it
- Using words like healthy and natural, which are regarded as weasel claims: words contradicting claims which follow them
- Using words like helps on product labels, which may mislead consumers into thinking a product will help

Many US advertisements for dietary supplements include the disclaimer, "This product is not intended to diagnose, treat, cure, or prevent any disease", since products intended to diagnose, treat, cure, or prevent disease must undergo FDA testing and approval.

=== Comparative advertising ===
Companies use a number of advertising techniques to assert that their products are the best available. One of the most common marketing tactics is comparative advertising, where "the advertised brand is explicitly compared with one or more competing brands and the comparison is obvious to the audience." Laws about comparative advertising have changed in the United States; perhaps the most drastic change occurred with the 1946 Lanham Act, the backbone of all cases involving false advertisement. Marketing strategies have become more aggressive, however, and the provisions of the Lanham Act have become outdated.

USCA §1125 was passed in 2012 as an addition to the Lanham Act, clarifying issues about comparative advertising. Anyone who uses words, symbols or misleading descriptions of fact in commerce which are likely to cause consumer confusion about their own product, or misrepresents the nature, characteristics or qualities of their own (or another's) product, is civilly liable. USCA §1125 addresses gaps in the Lanham Act, but is not a perfect remedy. Advertisements that present false descriptions of fact are considered deceptive, with no additional evidence required; when an advertisement makes a factual (but misleading) claim, however, evidence of confusion of an average consumer is needed.

== Puffing ==
Puffing (or puffery) is exaggerating a product's worth with meaningless or unsubstantiated terms, language based on opinion rather than fact, or the manipulation of data. Examples include superlatives such as "greatest of all time," "best in town," and "out of this world," or a restaurant's claim that it had "the world's best-tasting food."

Puffing is not an illegal form of false advertising, and may be seen as a humorous way to attract consumer attention. Puffing may be used as a defense against charges of deceptive advertising when it is formatted as opinion rather than fact. Omitted, or incomplete, information is characteristic of puffery.

=== Manipulation of terms ===
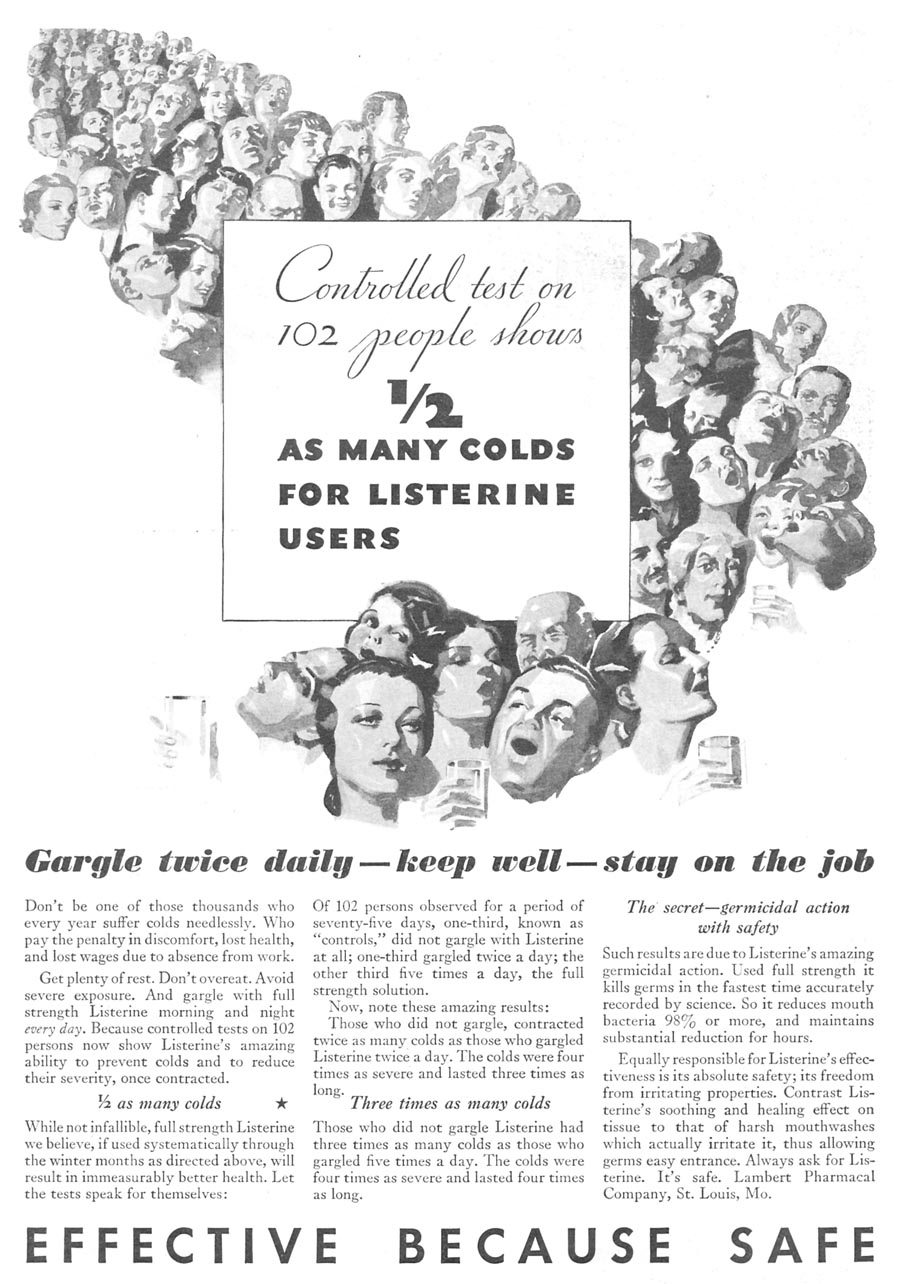
1932 Listerine advertisement. The FTC found that the claim of these advertisements, a reduced likelihood of catching a cold, was false.

Terms used in advertising may be used imprecisely. Depending on the jurisdiction, "organic" food may not have a clear legal definition; "light" has been used to describe foods low in calories, sugars, carbohydrates, salt, texture, viscosity, or even light in color. Labels such as "all-natural" are frequently used, but essentially meaningless.

Before the Family Smoking Prevention and Tobacco Control Act, tobacco companies regularly used terms like low tar, light, ultra-light and mild to imply that such products had less detrimental effects on health. In 2009, the United States banned manufacturers from labeling tobacco products with these terms. When the U.S. United Egg Producers used an "Animal Care Certified" logo on egg cartons, the Better Business Bureau said that it misled consumers by implying a higher level of animal care than was actually the case.

In 2010, Kellogg's Rice Krispies cereal claimed that it could improve a child's immunity. The company was forced to discontinue such claims. In 2015, Kellogg's advertised its Kashi products as "all natural" when they contained a number of artificial ingredients; Kellogg's paid $5 million to settle a lawsuit.

=== Incomplete comparison ===
"Better" means that one item is superior to another in some way; "best" means that it is superior to all others in some way. Advertisers often fail to specify the basis on which products are compared (such as price, size or quality) and, in the case of "better," what the product is compared to (a competitor's product, an earlier version of their product, or nothing at all). Without defining the terms "better" and "best", they become meaningless. An ad that says, "Our cold medicine is better" could be claiming that it is an improvement over taking nothing at all. Another often-seen example is "better than the leading brand", with a statistic attached; the "leading brand", however, is undefined.

=== Inconsistent comparison ===
In an inconsistent comparison, an item is compared with others only in terms of favorable attributes; this conveys the false impression that it is the best of all products overall. One variant is a website which lists competitors whose price for a particular item is higher, ignoring competitors whose price is lower.

=== Misleading illustrations ===
A common example is the serving suggestion pictures on food-product boxes, which include ingredients other than those included in the package. The "serving suggestion" disclaimer is a legal requirement for an illustration including items not included in the purchase, but if a customer fails to notice (or understand) the caption they may assume that all depicted items are included.

Some advertised photos of hamburgers convey the impression that the food is larger than it really is, and foods are "styled" to appear unrealistically appetizing. Products sold unassembled or unfinished may have a picture of the finished product, without a picture of what the customer is actually buying. Video-game commercials may include what are essentially short CGI films, with considerably better graphics than the actual game.

=== False coloring ===
Consumers may buy an item based on the color they saw in an advertisement. When used to make people think food is riper, fresher, healthier, or otherwise more desirable than it really is, food coloring may be deceptive. When combined with added sugar or corn syrup, bright colors convey a subconscious impression of healthy, ripe fruit, full of antioxidants and phytochemicals.

One variation is packaging which obscures the color of the foods within, such as red mesh bags holding yellow oranges or grapefruit which then appear to be a ripe orange or red. Regularly stirring minced meat on sale at a deli can make the surface meat remain red (and appear fresh) when it would oxidize (and brown), showing its true age if left unstirred. Some sodas are sold in colored bottles when the actual product is clear.

=== Angel dusting ===
Angel dusting is a process where an ingredient which would be beneficial in a certain quantity is added in insignificant quantities, which would have no consumer benefit. The advertiser then says that the product contains that ingredient, misleading a consumer into expecting that they will experience the benefit. A cereal may claim that it contains "12 essential vitamins and minerals," but the amounts of each may be only one percent (or less) of the Reference Daily Intake and provide virtually no nutritional benefit.

=== Chemical free ===
A number of products are advertised with some form of the statement "chemical free" or "no chemicals." Because everything on Earth is made up of chemicals except for a few elementary particles formed by radioactive decay or present in minute quantities from solar wind and sunlight, a chemical-free product is impossible. The label can indicate that a product contains no synthetic or exceptionally-harmful chemicals but, because the word "chemical" carries a stigma, it is often used without clarification.

=== Bait-and-switch ===
Bait-and-switch is a deceptive marketing tactic generally used to lure customers into a store. A company will advertise a product in an attractive way (the bait). The product is not available for some reason, however, and the company will try to sell something more expensive than what was originally advertised (the switch). Although only a small percentage of shoppers will buy the more expensive product, an advertiser may still profit.

Bait advertising is also used in other contexts; in an online job advertisement, a potential candidate may be deceived about working conditions, pay, or other variables. An airline may "bait" a potential client with a bargain before raising the price or redirecting them to a more expensive flight.

Businesses can avoid charges of misleading or deceptive conduct by following a few guidelines:

- Reasonable time frame, reasonable quantities: Businesses must supply publicized merchandise or services at the promoted cost for a sensible (or expressed) time frame and in sensible (or expressed) amounts.
- Qualifying statements: Qualifying statements such as "in store and online now" could still leave a business open to charges of bait advertising if sensible amounts of the publicized item are not available.
- Advertising deadlines: When advertising products or prices which are available for a limited time, the deadline (or expiration) should be made clear to consumers.
- Rain checks: When (through no fault of its own) a business cannot supply merchandise or service as promoted, it should provide the product (or service) as soon as it becomes available.
- Online claims: If a company operates primarily on the Internet, it must keep its website updated to avoid misleading customers.

In some countries, such as Australia, bait advertising can have severe legal penalties.

=== Guarantee without a remedy ===
If a company does not say what it will do if a product fails to meet expectations, it is generally free to do little or nothing. This is due to a legal technicality which states that a contract cannot be enforced unless it provides a basis for determining a breach and for providing a remedy for a breach. Fraud in crowdfunding communities such as Indiegogo and Kickstarter can be difficult to prosecute.

=== "No risk" ===
Advertisers can falsely claim that there is no risk in trying their product. They may charge a customer's credit card for a product, offering a full refund if not satisfied. However, the customer may not receive the product; they may be billed for things they did not want; they may be unable to call the company to authorize a return; they may not be refunded an item's shipping and handling costs, or they may have to pay for return shipping.

== Neurological deception ==
=== Mirror neurons ===
Mirror neurons are found in several sections of the human brain. They are responsible for mirroring a behavior (or movement) seen in others. In marketing, mirror neurons have been used to stimulate consumers to do what those in advertisements do.

=== Subliminal advertising ===
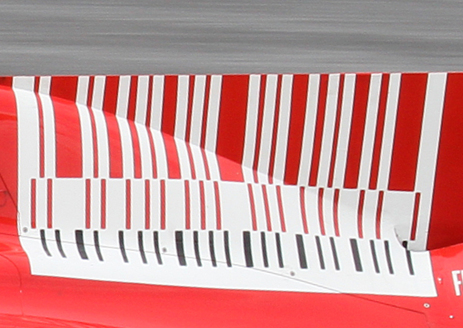
Marlboro-barcode subliminal advertising on Fernando Alonso's Ferrari F10

In subliminal advertising, products (or ideas) are advertised to consumers without their knowledge. Its purpose is to induce a consumer to buy an advertised item while they are unaware that they are being influenced into making a purchase. This form of advertising exploits a consumer's sub-limenal state.

== Regulation and enforcement ==
=== United States ===
The United States federal government regulates advertising through the Federal Trade Commission (FTC) with truth-in-advertising laws and enables private litigation through a number of laws, most significantly the Lanham Act (trademark and unfair competition). Specifically, under Section 43(a), false advertising is an actionable civil claim. Therefore, a party successful in a suit may be awarded damages or may be entitled to injunctive relief. In order to bring a false advertising claim, it is imperative that the plaintiff demonstrate that the defendant actually made false/misleading statement to their own or another's product, that at least a tendency to deceive a large amount of the intended audience was present, and that there was a likelihood of injury to the plaintiff, among other reasons.

The goal is prevention rather than punishment, reflecting the difference between civil and criminal law. A typical remedy is ordering an advertiser to stop its illegal acts, or to include disclosure of additional information which eliminates potentially-deceptive material. Corrective advertising may be mandated, but no fines or prison time is imposed except for the rare instances where an advertiser refuses to stop despite an order to do so.

The state governments General Business Law § 349 covers an essential part of the false advertisement regulation including "Deceptive acts or practices in the conduct of any business, trade or commerce or in the furnishing of any service in this state are hereby declared unlawful." In the Chimienti v. Wendy's Int'l, LLC Case the plaintiff failed to demonstrate that he suffered injury and did not sufficiently allege that the advertisements were materially misleading, so the claims were dismissed under the New York General Business Law. "For a claim to be considered a cause of action to recover damages pursuant to General Business Law § 349 has three elements: first, that the challenged act or practice was consumer-oriented; second, that it was misleading in a material way; and third, that the plaintiff suffered injury as a result of the deceptive act."

In 1905, Samuel Hopkins Adams released a series of articles detailing misleading claims by the patent medicine industry. The public outcry resulting from the articles led to the creation of the Food and Drug Administration the following year.

In 1941, the Supreme Court reviewed Federal Trade Commission v. Bunte Brothers, Inc. under Section 5 of the Federal Trade Commission Act of 1914 with regard to "unfair or deceptive acts or practices". The court reviewed three false-advertising cases in 2013 and 2014: Static Control v. Lexmark (concerning who may sue under the Lanham Act), ONY, Inc. v. Cornerstone Therapeutics, Inc. and POM Wonderful LLC v. Coca-Cola Co.

State governments have a number of unfair-competition laws which regulate false advertising, trademarks, and related issues. Many are similar to those of the FTC, and may be copied so closely that they are known as "little FTC acts." According to the National Consumer Law Center, the laws – known as "unfair, deceptive, or abusive acts and practices laws" (UDAAP or UDAP laws) – vary widely in the protection they offer consumers. In California, one such statute is the Unfair Competition Law (UCL). The UCL "borrows heavily from section 5 of the Federal Trade Commission Act", and has developed a body of case law.

Civil penalties may range from thousands to millions of dollars, and advertisers are sometimes ordered to provide all customers who purchased the product with a partial (or full) refund. Corrective advertising, disclosures, and other informational remedies may also be ordered. Advertisers may have to warn buyers of false statements in advertisements, make clear disclosures in future advertisements, or provide customers with other information to correct misinformation in an original ad.

=== United Kingdom ===
Advertising in the UK is regulated under the Consumer Protection from Unfair Trading Regulations 2008 (CPR), the de facto successor of the Trade Descriptions Act 1968. It is designed to implement the Unfair Commercial Practices Directive, part of a common set of European minimum standards for consumer protection which legally bind advertisers in England, Scotland, Wales, and parts of Ireland. The regulations, which focus on business-to-consumer (B2C) interactions, are modeled with a table meant to assess unfairness. Evaluations are made against four tests in the regulations which indicate deceptive advertising:

- Contrary to the requirements of professional diligence
- False or deceptive practice in relation to a specific list of key factors
- Omission of material information (unclear or untimely information)
- Aggressive practice by harassment, coercion or undue influence

These elements of deceptive advertising may impair a consumer's ability to make an informed decision, limiting their freedom of choice. The system resembles FTC regulation of behavioral advertising in prohibiting false and deceptive messaging, unfair and unethical commercial practices, and omitting important information; it differs in monitoring aggressive sales practices (regulation seven), which include high-pressure practices which go beyond persuasion. Harassment and coercion are not defined but rather interpreted as any undue physical and psychological pressure (in advertising). Each case is analyzed individually, allowing the authority to promote compliance with its enforcement policies, priorities, and available resources.

The CPR mandates different standards authorities for each country:

- In England and Wales, standards offences are handled by the Local Authority Trading Standards Services (TSS).
- In Northern Ireland, offences are handled by the Department of Enterprise, Trade and Investment.
- In Scotland, offences are evaluated (and potentially prosecuted) by the Crown Office and the Procurator Fiscal Service on behalf of the Lord Advocate.

=== Australia ===
The Australian Competition and Consumer Commission (also known as the ACCC) is responsible for ensuring that all businesses and consumers act in accordance with the Australian Competition & Consumer Act 2010 and fair-trade and consumer-protection laws (ACCC, 2016). Each state and territory has its own consumer-protection or consumer-affairs agency:

- ACT - Office of Fair Trading (OFT)
- NSW - Fair Trading
- Queensland – Office of Fair Trading
- South Australia - Office of Consumer and Business Services (CBS)
- Tasmania - Consumer Affairs & Fair Trading
- Consumer Affairs Victoria (CAV)
- Western Australia - Department of Commerce

The ACCC is designed to assist consumers, businesses, industries, and infrastructure nationwide. It assists the consumer by making available the rights, regulations, obligations, and procedures for refunds and returns, complaints, faulty products, and guarantees of products and services. They also develop laws and guidelines in relation to unfair practices and misleading or deceptive conduct.

There are many similarities in the laws and regulation between the Australian ACCC, New Zealand's FTA, the U.S. FTC, and the United Kingdom's CPR. The goals of these policies are to support fair trade and competition and to reduce deceptive and false practices in advertising. A number of countries have agreements with the International Consumer Protection and Enforcement Network (ICPEN).

=== New Zealand ===
The Fair Trading Act 1986 aims to promote fair competition and trading in New Zealand. The act prohibits certain conduct in trade, provides for the disclosure of information available to the consumer relating to the supply of goods and services, and regulates product safety. Although it does not require businesses to provide all information to consumers in every circumstance, businesses are obliged to ensure that the information they provide is accurate and important information is not withheld from consumers.

A number of sales practices intended to mislead consumers are illegal under the Fair Trading Act. The act also applies to certain activities whether or not the parties are "in trade," such as employment advertising, pyramid selling, and supplying products covered by product-safety and consumer-information standards.

Consumers and businesses can rely on and take legal action under the act. Consumers may contact the trader and assert rights stated in the act. If the issues are not resolved, the consumer (or anyone else) can take legal action under the act. The Commerce Commission is also empowered to take enforcement action when allegations are sufficiently serious to meet its criteria.

There are also four consumer-information standards:

- Country of Origin (Clothing and Footwear) Labeling Regulations 1992
- Fiber Content Labeling Regulations 2000
- Used Motor Vehicles Regulations 2008
- Water Efficiency Regulations 2010

=== India ===
The voluntary Advertising Standards Council of India (ASCI) was established in 1985 to evaluate the truth and fairness of advertisements. The ASCI also aims to ensure that ads are respectful to widely accepted public decency principles. It has a number of codes, including the Press Council Act of 1978, the News Broadcasters Association's Code of Conduct, the Young Persons Act of 1956, the Consumer Protection Act of 1986, the Drugs and Cosmetics Act of 1940, and the Food Safety and Standards Act of 2006. Surrogate advertising is a major misleading advertising tactic in India. Many companies use this idea to advertise Betting, Gambling, online fantasy gaming and casino apps.

== See also ==
- Surreptitious advertising
