= Deadpool and Korg React =

2021 American short film

- A screenshot from the film depicting Deadpool and Korg
- Directed by: Ryan Reynolds
- Written by: Ryan Reynolds
- Based on: Deadpool by; Rob Liefeld; Fabian Nicieza; Korg by; Greg Pak; Carlo Pagulayan
- Produced by: Ryan Reynolds
- Starring: Ryan Reynolds; Taika Waititi
- Production company: Maximum Effort
- Release date: July 13, 2021
- Running time: 4 minutes
- Country: United States
- Language: English

Deadpool and Korg React is a 2021 American superhero promotional short film featuring the Marvel Comics characters Deadpool and Korg. The film was written and directed by Ryan Reynolds, with him and Taika Waititi respectively starring as Deadpool and Korg. In Deadpool and Korg React, Wade Wilson and Korg react to the trailer of Free Guy (2021) before discussing the possibility of joining the Marvel Cinematic Universe (MCU). Reynolds reprises his role from the X-Men film series, while Waititi reprises his role from the MCU films Thor: Ragnarok (2017) and Avengers: Endgame (2019).

Deadpool and Korg React was originally released to Reynolds' YouTube channel on July 13, 2021, as promotion for Free Guy, which also stars Reynolds and Waititi. Responses to the short praised it as a tease for Deadpool & Wolverine (2024) and for showing the character's narrative potential in the MCU. Its humor was also highlighted by many critics.

== Plot ==
After making a trailer reaction video for Cruella (2021) as part of a series called Deadpool's Maximum Reactions, Deadpool invites Korg to make a similar video for the trailer for Free Guy (2021). Deadpool asks Korg of his opinion of Taika Waititi while commenting as to his own lack of resemblance to Ryan Reynolds' character in the film. Following the video, Deadpool asks Korg about his own chances of joining the Marvel Cinematic Universe (MCU), to which Korg responds by complimenting the possibilities and telling him to keep an eye out for an email from Marvel Studios.

== Cast ==
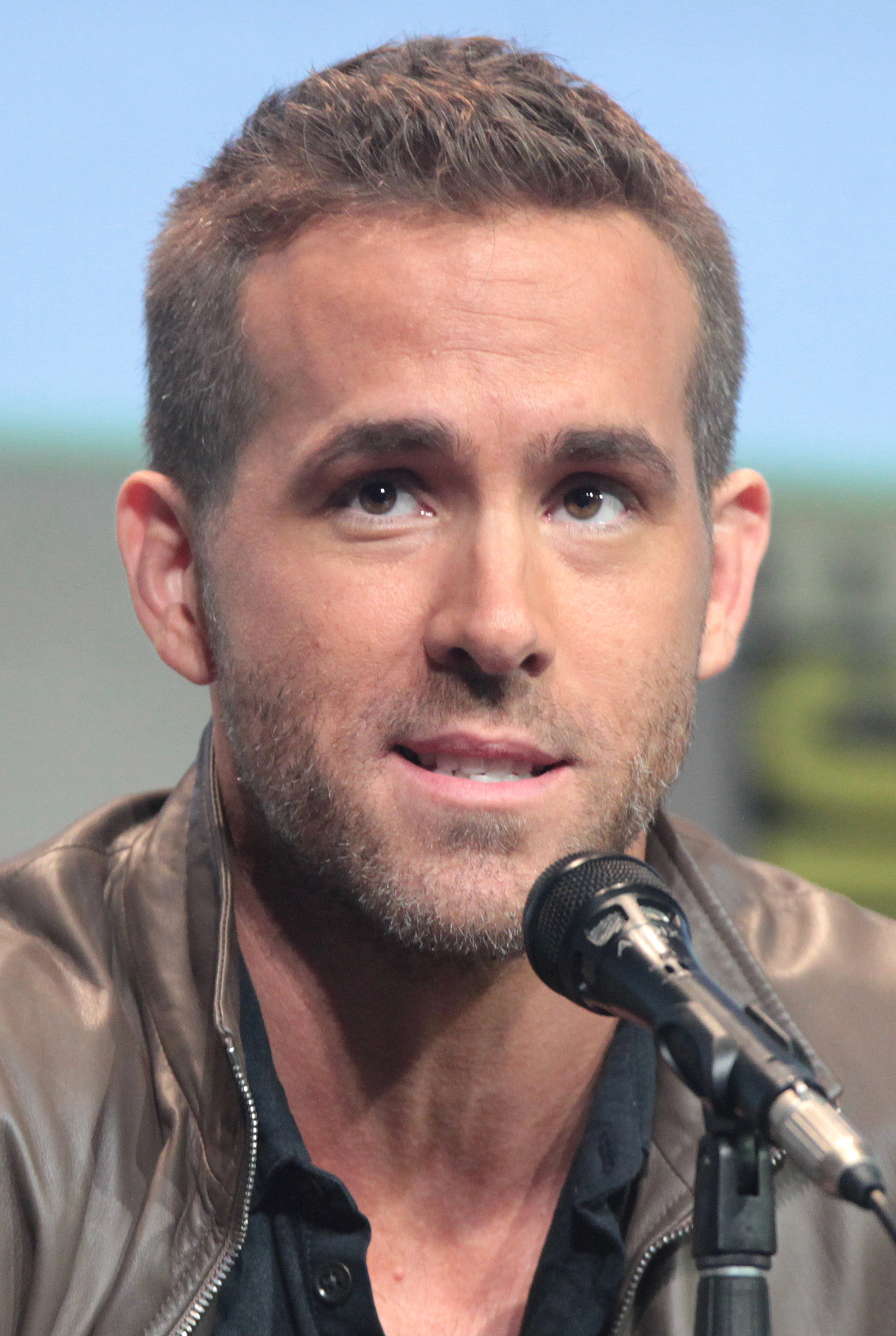
Ryan Reynolds reprises the role of Wade Wilson / Deadpool from the X-Men film series

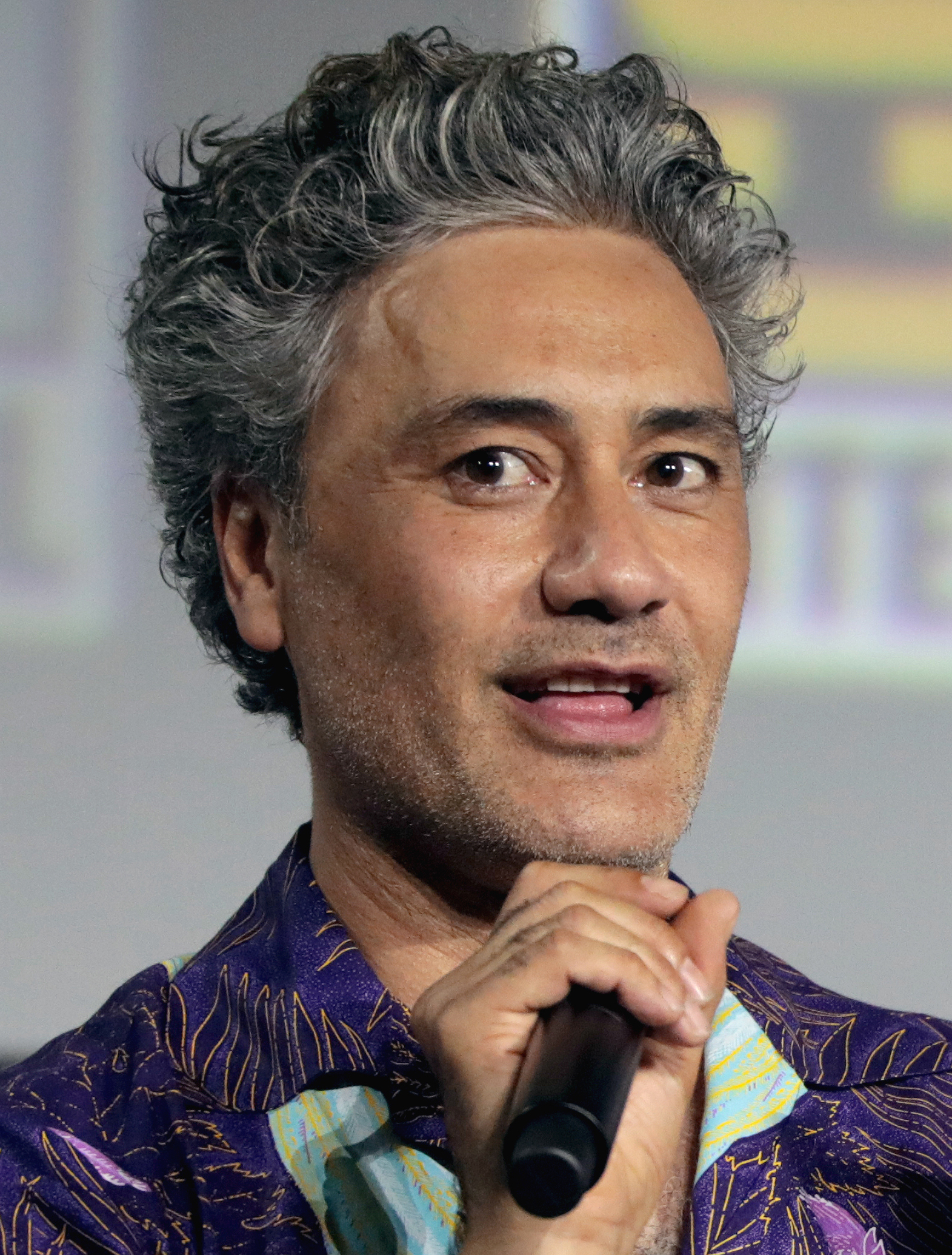
Taika Waititi reprises the role of Korg from the Marvel Cinematic Universe

- Ryan Reynolds as Wade Wilson / Deadpool: A wisecracking mercenary with accelerated healing but severe scarring over his body after undergoing an experimental regenerative mutation.
- Taika Waititi as Korg: A Kronan gladiator who befriended Thor, who was forced to participate in the Contest of Champions on the planet Sakaar.

== Background ==
After the acquisition of 21st Century Fox by The Walt Disney Company was announced in December 2017 and completed in March 2019, all X-Men films in development were canceled, including X-Force and Fox's Deadpool 3, with Marvel Studios taking control of the franchise. Disney CEO Bob Iger said that Wade Wilson / Deadpool would be integrated into the Marvel Cinematic Universe (MCU) under Disney, and the character's films could remain R-rated "as long as we let the audiences know what's coming".

By Disney's acquisition of 20th Century Fox, Free Guy (2021) had been in development since 2016 and was one of the first Fox films to continue production under Disney ownership, as well as under the studio's new name 20th Century Studios. Deadpool and Korg React references the film's release delays, from July 2020 to August 2021. Reynolds had first pitched a short film featuring Deadpool interrogating the hunter who killed Bambi's mother from Bambi (1942) and would have seen Deadpool trying to find out how to become a loathed character. After that pitch was denied by Disney, development on Deadpool and Korg React began.

== Release ==
Deadpool and Korg React was released to Ryan Reynolds' YouTube channel on July 13, 2021, acquiring over 4 million views within 24 hours.

== Reception ==
Upon its release, Deadpool and Korg React received a positive response. Empire praised the dialogue and the chemistry between both characters. Syfy Wire commented that seeing the two "fan-favorite" characters together for the first time was "incredibly cool", and speculated it could be a way to get fans used to the idea of Deadpool becoming a part of the Marvel Cinematic Universe before an actual introduction, while Nerdist considered it to be "a very unexpected way" for Deadpool to officially join the shared universe. Other outlets expressed doubt over it being an official integration of the character to the universe.

== See also ==
- No Good Deed, a short film starring Reynolds as Wilson that screened before Logan
- Team Thor, a series of short films directed by Waititi that served as marketing for Thor: Ragnarok
