= Green Cell Technologies =

Biotechnology firm

- Type: Private
- Industry: Biotechnology
- Founded: 2011
- Founder: Roy Henderson
- Headquarters: Douglas, Isle of Man, United Kingdom
- Website: greencelltechnologies.com

Green Cell Technologies is a biotechnology firm specializing in extraction and processing for various food, agricultural, and industrial sectors. Founded in 2011, it is headquartered in the Isle of Man and operates a research facility in Cape Town, South Africa.

== Technology ==
The company's core technology is Dynamic Cellular Disruption (DCD), a mechanical process that uses specialized Disruptor machines to rupture cell structures in biomass without solvents or high heat, facilitating the extraction of compounds. Applications reported in trade media include producing nutraceutical extracts, processing seaweed to increase protein content, and creating bases for beverages.

== History and partnerships ==
Green Cell Technologies was founded by Roy Henderson, a retired South African Navy officer, and Jan Vlok. Its technology originated from a 2007–2008 project focused on extracting compounds from orange peel. Green Cell Technologies entered a global licensing agreement with citrus processor Citrosuco in 2018. In 2023, the company partnered with Molecular Health Technologies for the distribution of a kanna extract produced using the DCD method.
