= Medicine selling channel =

Slang term for Chinese media outlets

Medicine selling channel is a slang term for some radio and television stations in mainland China. These radio and television stations got their name from the large number of "medical programs" (which are actually advertisements, almost all of which are false advertisements, mostly to promote drugs that can treat various incurable diseases).

== Origin ==
In recent years, with the development of cable television, digital television and the Internet, the public's access to information has been increasing. However, many radio and television stations have become drug-selling stations due to the dearth of programming (one of the reasons is the lack of government funding) and the dwindling audience, especially in second- and third-tier cities or county-level radio and television stations, and there are also a few underground radio stations.

== Features ==
Drug sales programs mostly appear as health and medical featured programs. The content usually includes self-proclaimed "expert" and "director" (「主任」) presenters introduce the efficacy of drugs or health products, and "patients" calling in to consult or confirm the efficacy.

== See also ==
- Infomercial
