= Wade Wilson (film character) =

X-Men film series and Marvel Cinematic Universe character

- X-Men film series and Marvel Cinematic Universe character
- Ryan Reynolds as Wade Winston Wilson / Deadpool in Deadpool (2016)
- First appearance: Original: X-Men Origins: Wolverine (2009); Revised: Deadpool (2016)
- Based on: Deadpool by: Rob Liefeld; Fabian Nicieza
- Adapted by: Rhett Reese; Paul Wernick; Skip Woods (Note: This information is implied and depicted in X-Men Origins: Wolverine (2009), set in the original timeline of the X-Men film series.); David Benioff
- Portrayed by: Ryan Reynolds; Scott Adkins (Weapon XI)

In-universe information
- Full name: Wade Winston Wilson
- Aliases: Deadpool; Weapon XI
- Species: Human mutant
- Occupation: Assassin; Mercenary; Soldier
- Affiliation: Canadian Special Forces; The Resistance; Team X; Time Variance Authority; Weapon Plus; X-Force
- Weapon: Dual katanas; Dual Desert Eagle Mark XIX handguns; Boot knife; Dual push daggers
- Significant other: Vanessa Carlysle (girlfriend)
- Nationality: Canadian

Wade Winston Wilson, also known as Deadpool, is a character portrayed by Ryan Reynolds in 20th Century Fox's X-Men film series and later the Marvel Cinematic Universe (MCU) media franchise produced by Marvel Studios. Based on the Marvel Comics character Deadpool by Rob Liefeld and Fabian Nicieza, he was loosely adapted for his first appearance in X-Men Origins: Wolverine (2009), in which he is depicted as a member of Major William Stryker's Team X who is transformed into a genetically altered mutant killer known as Weapon XI, before being defeated by his former teammate Wolverine. This iteration of the character was negatively received by both critics and fans alike for deviating from the source material.

However, the timeline of the original X-Men film series was reset into the revised timeline following the events of X-Men: Days of Future Past (2014), narratively allowing for a more faithful, rebooted iteration of the character to be depicted starting with Deadpool (2016). For this iteration, Wilson is a dishonorably discharged Special Forces operative and terminal cancer patient volunteering for an experimental treatment to activate his latent mutant genes. It gives him a regenerative healing factor that counteracts his illness but disfigures him, resulting in him adopting the moniker "Deadpool" (a name he borrows from his local dive bar's gambling system), killing the mutant scientist responsible and reuniting with his fiancée Vanessa Carlysle. This version of the character received critical acclaim, with praise directed at Reynolds' performance and the faithfulness of the character's background to the comics. The first film's success led to a sequel, Deadpool 2 (2018), in which Wilson forms the X-Force to protect a young mutant from a time-traveling mercenary and avert his turn towards tyranny in the distant future. After Disney bought Fox in 2019, Deadpool was integrated into the MCU through the multiverse, with Reynolds reprising his role in Deadpool & Wolverine (2024) and will reportedly reprise the role in Avengers: Doomsday (2026).

== Concept, creation, and characterization ==
=== Development ===
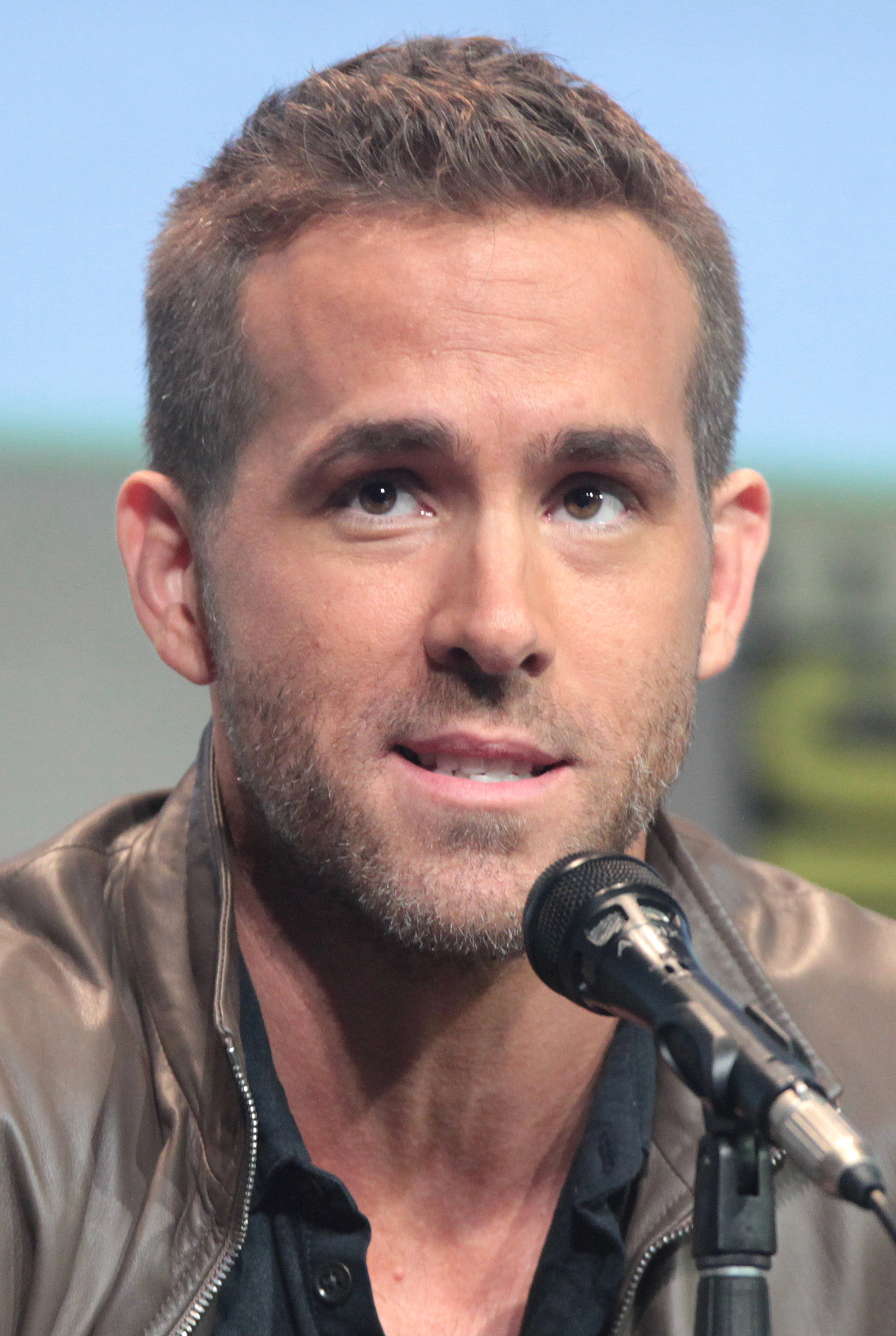
Canadian-American actor Ryan Reynolds was drawn to the role of Deadpool after learning that in the comics the character refers to his appearance as "Ryan Reynolds crossed with a Shar-Pei", later lobbying for a film featuring the character to be made.

Artisan Entertainment had announced a deal with Marvel Entertainment in May 2000 to co-produce, finance, and distribute several films based on Marvel Comics's characters, including Deadpool, a newer character introduced in the early 1990s. By February 2004, screenwriter and director David S. Goyer and Ryan Reynolds were working on a Deadpool film at New Line Cinema. They had worked together on the Marvel film Blade: Trinity. Reynolds was interested in the part of Deadpool after learning that in the comics the character refers to his appearance as "Ryan Reynolds crossed with a Shar-Pei". New Line executive Jeff Katz, who thought Reynolds was the only actor suitable for the role, championed the idea. However, there were rights issues with 20th Century Fox and their X-Men films, and the project did not move forward.

By March 2005, Reynolds learned that Fox had expressed interest in a film featuring Deadpool. The character was set to make a cameo appearance in the 2009 film X-Men Origins: Wolverine, with Reynolds cast in the part. His role was expanded during the film's production. Katz was an executive at Fox at that point, and said that Deadpool was "nicely set up to be explored in his own way" in a future film. The film's portrayal deviates from the original comic character, "imbuing him with several superpowers and sewing his mouth shut". Deadpool apparently dies in the film, though a post-credits scene showing him still alive was added to the film shortly before its release. After the successful opening weekend of Wolverine, Fox officially began development on Deadpool, with Reynolds attached to star and X-Men producer Lauren Shuler Donner involved. The spinoff was set to ignore the Wolverine version of Deadpool and return to the character's roots with a slapstick tone and a "propensity to break the fourth wall".

At Fox, the film went through several directors before Tim Miller settled on the position, with Rhett Reese and Paul Wernick hired to write the script. Meanwhile, Reynolds took the lead role in Green Lantern, a film that was critically and financially unsuccessful. Due to this poor reception and the fact that a film based on Deadpool would most likely be rated R instead of PG-13, Fox became doubtful about the project, even after Reynolds produced test footage of himself in-character. However, the footage was eventually leaked in 2014 to enthusiastic reviews, prompting Fox to green-light the project. Reynolds attributed Fox's green-lighting of the film entirely to the leak. He, Miller, and the writers had previously discussed leaking the footage themselves, and Reynolds initially thought that Miller had done so. He later believed the leak came from someone at Fox. In exchange for being able to make the film the way they wanted, Fox gave the crew a much smaller budget than is typical for superhero films.

=== Characterization ===
"The character is very crass. His brain is like a half-eaten omelet inside the skull of a 7-year-old."

— Ryan Reynolds on Wade Wilson's characterization.

In both timelines, Wade possesses a facetiously self-aware sense of humor that disorients and annoys his enemies. He regularly insults and belittles his enemies in light and humorous ways. He has no sense of shame, and can find the humor in any situation, even after months of continuous torture and being shaken by his subsequent transformation. Only a few select people can withstand his seemingly endless talking, resulting in his mouth being sewn shut in the final act of X-Men Origins: Wolverine. Ajax also threatens to sew Wade's mouth shut in Deadpool when Wade is undergoing (unconventional) cancer treatment because of his nonstop talking.

In the original timeline, Wade's sense of humor is derived from the comics. His personality is significantly more fleshed out in the new timeline. He loves cartoons, potty humor, Skee-Ball, classical music, television shows, rap music, and American pop culture. His favorite band is Wham! and George Michael, specifically, the song "Careless Whisper." He remains very movie-cultured, referencing The Matrix, RoboCop, Alien 3, Yentl, 127 Hours, Cocoon, Star Wars, Green Lantern (which also stars Ryan Reynolds), and even X-Men: Days of Future Past.

Like his comics counterpart, Wade himself is aware that he is a fictional character and makes fun of this by breaking the fourth wall and speaking directly to the audience. In Deadpool 2, when his autograph is requested by a fan, he signs it "Ryan Reynolds."

Despite his initial immaturity, Wade is a genuine, kind, good-hearted man, and in time becomes ethical and heroic to the point of sacrificing himself to save the mutant Russell Collins. Although he is a mercenary, he agreed to scare off a young girl's stalker without being paid for his troubles, revealing he can be compassionate. On matters of love, he can be sensitive, feeling forced to abandon his girlfriend, Vanessa because of his terminal cancer. He advises his taxi driver, Dopinder, to fight for the object of his affections, Gita. After Vanessa's death, Wade begins to develop a death wish, yet his inability to die further imbalances his already fractured psyche. He is content to die of cancer in the Icebox until he finds a new purpose in protecting Russell from Cable. After his near-death experience, he still has not accepted Vanessa's demise, so he uses Cable's time travel device to save her.

Reynolds worked with longtime trainer Don Saladino to get in shape for the role, gaining 7 pounds of lean muscle. Saladino commented that while they aimed to achieve an aesthetically pleasing appearance, they also wanted to get Reynolds "actual strength over superficial", so they spent extensive time working on Reynolds' mobility prior to working on actual strength.

=== Marvel Cinematic Universe ===
After the acquisition of 21st Century Fox by the Walt Disney Company was announced in December 2017 and completed in March 2019, Disney CEO Bob Iger said that Deadpool would be integrated with the Marvel Cinematic Universe (MCU) under Disney, and that the company would be willing to make future R-rated Deadpool films "as long as we let the audiences know what's coming". The Once Upon a Deadpool version of the film was being watched carefully by Disney and Marvel Studios to see whether it might inform how they could approach the character and integrate him into the PG-13 MCU.

In October 2019, Reese and Wernick said that they had a script in development, but were waiting for approval from Marvel Studios to begin production on the third film. Reese said, "[Deadpool] will live in the R-rated universe that we've created, and hopefully we'll be allowed to play a little bit in the MCU sandbox as well and incorporate him into that." In December 2019, Reynolds confirmed that a third Deadpool film was in development at Marvel Studios, which was confirmed by Marvel Studios President Kevin Feige in January 2021, with Reynolds reprising his role. The film retained the R-rating of the prior films and is set in the MCU. Feige described Wilson as a "very different type of character" in the MCU. In March 2022, Shawn Levy was revealed as the film's director after previously collaborating with Reynolds on Free Guy (2021) and The Adam Project (2022), while Rhett Reese and Paul Wernick rewrote the Molyneux sisters' screenplay, reprising their duties from the first two Deadpool films. Filming began in May 2023. Reynolds also produced the film alongside Kevin Feige through his production company Maximum Effort.

In May 2022, screenwriter Michael Waldron confirmed in an interview that there had been discussions within Marvel regarding Reynolds making a cameo appearance as Deadpool in the multiverse-focused film Doctor Strange in the Multiverse of Madness (2022), as he himself felt "[it] would've been crazy to not raise that" after the inclusions of other X-Men related elements in the film such as the Savage Land and the character Professor Charles Xavier (played by returning X-Men actor Patrick Stewart). However, Waldron would ultimately feel as if the film was an unfitting place to feature the character. The Marvel Studios: Assembled episode on the making of Multiverse of Madness also featured concept art depicting a "Deadpool dimension", an alternate world cityscape with multiple billboards adorned with Deadpool-themed posters and comic book art. A pair of sneakers inspired by Deadpool's costume appears in the main-on-end credits sequence of the metafictional Disney+ television series She-Hulk: Attorney at Law (2022), featured as part of a collection of Marvel Comics-inspired sneakers owned by Augustus Pugliese (Josh Segarra).

In October 2025, former MCU filmmaker and DC Studios co-chairman James Gunn revealed that he had spoken to Ryan Reynolds about a potential cameo appearance as Deadpool in the DC Universe (DCU) television series Peacemaker (2022–2025). Deadpool would have appeared in the season 2 finale "Full Nelson" as an inhabitant of one of the alternate dimensions observed by A.R.G.U.S. within the Quantum Unfolding Chamber. Despite Reynolds' enthusiasm, the cameo was ultimately scrapped out of concern for the various legal issues involved in licensing out the character from Marvel Studios to appear on the series.

== Appearances ==
- In the original timeline, Wilson is first referenced in X2 (2003); his name appears on William Stryker's computer that contain files on multiple individuals and organizations related to mutants.
- In Deadpool (2016), set in a revised timeline created by the X-Men, this version is a mercenary who is diagnosed with late-stage cancer and turns to Weapon X after he is offered a cure. One of the scientists, Francis "Ajax" tortures Wilson in order to catalyze the treatment, which eventually results in regressive mutant genes activating, causing the latter's disfigurement and healing factor. In response, Wilson develops a vendetta against Ajax and undergoes a quest to force him to fix his disfigurement before eventually killing him upon learning it would be impossible.
- In the short film No Good Deed (2017), Wilson comes across an old man being mugged in an alley, and races to change into his Deadpool costume before he helps the man. As Wilson struggles to get dressed, the man is shot. Wilson emerges, wearing his costume, only to find the man dead and the mugger long gone.
- In Deadpool 2 (2018), after the death of his girlfriend Vanessa, Wilson finds himself protecting a troubled mutant boy named Russell Collins from the time-traveling Cable.
- In the promotional short film Deadpool and Korg React (2021), Wilson invites Korg to make a trailer reaction video for the trailer for Free Guy (2021). Taika Waititi voices Korg in the short, reprising his role from the MCU films Thor: Ragnarok (2017), Avengers: Endgame (2019), and Thor: Love and Thunder (2022).
- In Deadpool & Wolverine (2024), Wilson is recruited by the Time Variance Authority to change the history of the Marvel Cinematic Universe along with Wolverine.
- The character reportedly will appear in the upcoming film Avengers: Doomsday (2026).
- A fourth film is in the works.

== Character biography ==
=== Original Earth-10005 variant ===
==== Team X ====
In the original continuity, Wade Wilson is a commando, mercenary, and Yale graduate with enhanced human reflexes and agility due to being a mutant. During the Vietnam War, Wade is a member of a black ops group called Team X under the command of William Stryker. The team also includes James "Logan" Howlett, Victor Creed, Frederick Dukes, John Wraith, Chris Bradley, and Agent Zero. One mission involved trying to find a mineral used to create adamantium in Nigeria. Wade served as a translator for the Igbo-speaking people of a village where they were directed to find the adamantium. After the communications fail to tell the team where the source of the adamantium is, Stryker orders the team to massacre the entire village. Wade, Zero, and Victor all begin slaughtering the people of the village until Logan stops it and leaves the group. After Logan's departure, some of the other team members begin to question the team's morality and leave. However, Wade, Victor, and Zero remain faithful to Stryker.

==== Brainwashed by Stryker ====
Six years later, Wade is taken to Stryker's base at Three Mile Island to be used as a catalyst for the Weapon XI project. With Victor and Zero's help, Stryker collects DNA from several mutants (including Wraith, Bradley, Scott Summers, and Logan), whose powers could be used collectively within one body without destroying it. Stryker has Wilson lobotomized and brainwashed into doing his bidding, giving him an adamantium skeleton like Logan's, including retractable blades in his forearms. Unlike Logan, Wilson only has one sword protruding from each forearm and the blades are significantly longer, similar to the swords he used before becoming Weapon XI. Stryker also has his mouth sewn shut due to his previous annoyance at Wilson's constant wisecracking. Stryker dubs him as the "mutant killer" known as the "Deadpool". Unlike his counterpart in the comics, this name is conceived as Weapon XI has the powers of several mutants "pooled" into the dead body of Wade Wilson. After freeing the other mutants captured by Stryker and Victor on Three Mile Island, Logan is stopped by the now activated Weapon XI. Logan faces Weapon XI alone, giving the mutants time to escape and eventually Logan climbs atop a cooling tower at Stryker's plant, with Weapon XI teleporting to the top. Logan is about to be decapitated by Weapon XI (under the command of Stryker) until Victor later joins to help Logan. Weapon XI is beheaded and seemingly defeated by Logan. However, Wilson survives decapitation.

=== Revised Earth-10005 variant ===
==== Early life ====
In a new continuity created through the aversion of the war between Sentinels, humans, and mutantkind, (Note: As depicted in X-Men: Days of Future Past (2014)) Wilson is now a former Special Forces soldier who was dishonorably discharged, becoming a mercenary operating at Sister Margaret's School for Wayward Girls, where he meets and eventually proposes to hustler Vanessa Carlysle.

==== Becoming Deadpool ====
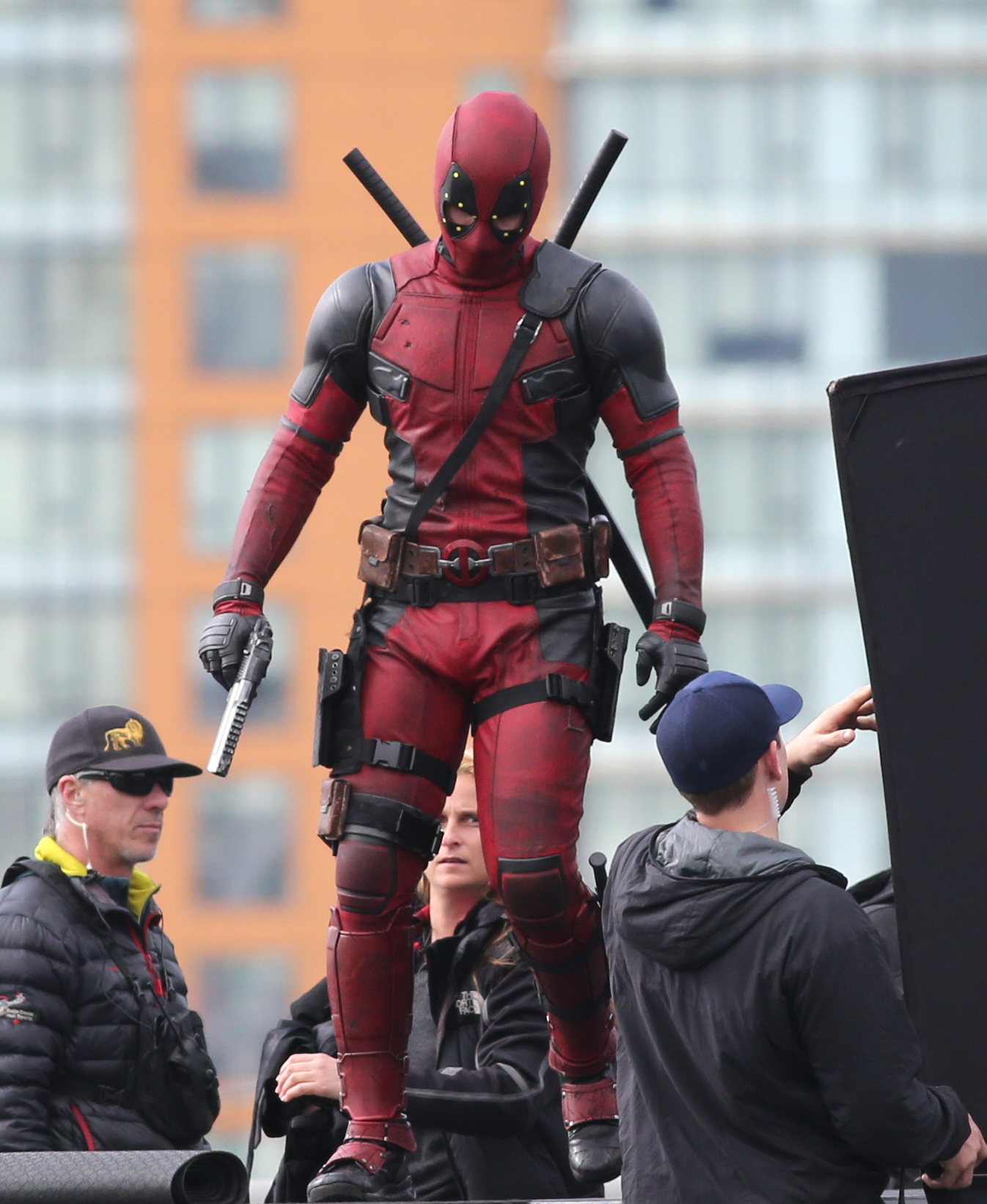
Ryan Reynolds in costume as Wilson on the set of Deadpool.

Wilson is diagnosed with late-stage Stage 4 cancer shortly after being engaged to Vanessa. He is approached by a representative of an unknown organization, who offers him a cure in addition to powers "most men only dream of". While he initially declines the offer, he eventually returns to accept it. However, not all is as it seems, as he soon realizes the organization is actually attempting to create an army of superpowered individuals under their control. Wilson undergoes numerous forms of torture at the hands of Ajax and Angel Dust, though he never loses his sense of humor. Eventually, Ajax is successful in activating Wilson's dormant mutant genes, which allows him to heal and regenerate from any wound. While Wilson's healing factor cures his cancer, it also horrifically deforms his entire outer layer of skin. Driven partially insane by the ordeal and his disfigurement, Wade escapes and destroys the facility in the process, but ultimately loses to Ajax in battle. Wilson is presumed dead, but survives thanks to his new-found abilities.

Afraid to reunite with Vanessa in his current appearance, Wilson takes on the moniker "Deadpool", after remembering when his best friend Weasel bet in the Sister Margaret's group "dead pool" that he would die, and begins hunting for Ajax to force him to fix him. He eventually tracks him down, though his attempt to kill him is interrupted by Colossus and Negasonic Teenage Warhead, members of the X-Men. The two attempt to apprehend Wilson; however he manages to escape by severing his own hand. Shortly after, Ajax targets and kidnaps Vanessa to get back at Wilson, hoping to lure him out and kill him successfully. Upon learning of this, Deadpool contacts Colossus and Negasonic Teenage Warhead for their assistance. The three confront Ajax and his men, where Deadpool is able to save Vanessa and ultimately kill Ajax, much to Colossus' dismay. Despite his appearance, Vanessa still accepts Wilson, and the two embrace.

==== Stopping Cable ====
Two years later, Wilson continues working as a successful mercenary-for-hire, taking down the most despicable and untouchable of criminals. On the day of his anniversary with Vanessa, Wilson is assigned to kill mobster Sergei Valishnikov. However, when Deadpool attacks his base, Valishnikov hides in a panic room. Since waiting for Sergei to get out was going to take too much time, Wilson decides to let him go for the time being in order to spend time with Vanessa. Unfortunately, Valishnikov and his men decide to retaliate against Deadpool and attack him at his apartment, inadvertently killing Vanessa, after which Deadpool finishes the hit in vengeance. For the next six months, Wilson tries to commit suicide by blowing himself up. This ultimately fails, however, due to his healing factor, and his pieces remain alive to be found and reassembled by Colossus.

Colossus manages to convince Wade to join the X-Men as a form of physical and mental healing after the death of Vanessa. He becomes a trainee and accompanies Colossus and Negasonic Teenage Warhead to a standoff between authorities and an unstable young mutant named Russell Collins. After trying to calm Russell down and prevent any more damage, Wilson realizes that the orphanage where Russell lives, labeled a mutant "reeducation center," has abused him and Wilson subsequently kills one of the staff members, leading to his and Russell's arrest. They are taken to the Ice Box and their powers inhibited with special collars. Without his healing factor, Wilson's cancer returns, leaving him resigned to his fate. Meanwhile, a cybernetic soldier from the future, Cable, arrives in 2018 to murder Russell before he can kill his first victim, as Cable's family is murdered by a future version of Russell. Cable's breaking into the Ice Box allows for Wilson and Russell to escape their cell, and when Cable comes to kill Russell, Wilson's collar is broken in the melee. With his powers restored and cancer cured again, Wilson attempts to defend Russell, but is beaten by Cable who takes Vanessa's Skee-Ball token. Cable nearly beats Wade to death, and Wade experiences a vision of Vanessa in the afterlife where she convinces him to go after Russell and save him.

==== Forming X-Force and teaming-up with Cable ====
Wilson returns to life and forms a superhero team of his own called X-Force. They attempt to assault a convoy transferring Russell and several other Ice Box prisoners by parachuting from a plane, but the only survivors of the team end up being Wilson and Domino, a mutant whose powers pertain to luck. The two assault the convoy alone, finding Cable already on the scene. While Domino drives the truck and Cable fights Wilson, Russell releases fellow prisoner Juggernaut, who agrees to assist Russell in killing his abusive former headmaster. Before escaping, Juggernaut destroys the convoy and tears Wade in half, allowing the two of them to escape unhindered.

Cable reluctantly agrees to work with a recovering Wilson and Domino in order to stop Russell's first murder. The team is initially overpowered by Juggernaut while Russell terrorizes his headmaster until Colossus, Negasonic Teenage Warhead, and her girlfriend Yukio arrive and helped to hold him off. Wilson attempts to talk Russell down, even putting on an inhibitor collar to negate his powers as a show of good faith. This ultimately fails, however, and Cable shoots the boy. Wilson jumps in front of the bullet and is fatally wounded, as his healing factor is negated by the collar. Feeling it is his time to go, he refuses to let anyone remove the collar, choosing to be reunited with Vanessa in the afterlife. Russell is inspired by Wilson's sacrifice and chooses not to kill the headmaster, preventing the death of Cable's family in the future. Cable decides to use his final time-traveling charge to go back and hide Vanessa's Skee-Ball token inside Deadpool's uniform, in the spot where he would be shot. Wilson still takes the bullet for Russell, but this time it is stopped by the token and Wilson survives. Despite this, Russell is still inspired by Wilson's sacrifice and does not kill the headmaster. As the group leaves the scene, the gloating headmaster mocks them until Wade's taxi-driver friend Dopinder runs him over with his car, killing him anyway.

==== Altering history ====
Negasonic Teenage Warhead and Yukio manage to fix Cable's time-traveling device, and Wade uses it to make several alterations to the timeline. He first goes back and saves both Vanessa and former X-Force member Peter. He then goes back and shoots the Weapon XI version of Wade Wilson several times, confusing the bystanding Wolverine. After this, he makes a stop in the late 2000s to shoot Ryan Reynolds in the back of the head as he is reading the script for the film Green Lantern (2011), before traveling to Austria-Hungary in 1889 in order to kill a newborn Adolf Hitler and prevent his turn towards dictatorship. Wade's rescue of Vanessa and the members of X-Force places the prior events into an alternate timeline, dubbed Earth-41633. Every other timeline alteration also created branching universes, including his shooting of Weapon XI, which became Earth-18315.

Wade also travels to Earth-199999 and attempts to join the Avengers, but is turned down by Happy Hogan. Afterwards, he destroys Cable's Time Slider.

==== Teaming up with Wolverine ====
Six years later, Wade has retired from superhero activity and is working as a car salesman with Peter after breaking up with Vanessa. During his birthday party, the Time Variance Authority (TVA) captures Wade and brings him to Mr. Paradox, who offers Wade a place on Earth-199999, referred to by the TVA as Earth-616 and the "Sacred Timeline". Wade briefly glimpses a video of himself injured in Thor Odinson's arms until Paradox cuts the feed, and is equipped with a new suit and weapons. However, Paradox reveals that Wade's world, Earth-10005, is deteriorating as a result of the death of Logan, (Note: As depicted in Logan.) who was its "anchor being", and plans to use a device called the Time Ripper to immediately "mercy kill" Wade's timeline rather than spending thousands of years waiting for it to naturally die. Realizing that he would lose his friends and loved ones, Wade steals Paradox's TemPad and uses it to travel to Logan's grave, hoping to resurrect him and save their timeline. When this fails, Wade kills several TVA agents sent by Paradox and uses the TemPad to travel the multiverse in search of an alternate universe "variant" of Logan that can replace his world's.

Wade returns to the TVA with a variant of Logan, but is told by Paradox that not only can an anchor being not be replaced by a variant in any case, but that this variant is considered to be the worst Wolverine by the TVA due to failing to save his fellow X-Men from a group of mutant-hunting humans. When Wade realizes that Paradox is acting without the knowledge of his superiors and threatens to tell on him, Paradox sends Wade and Logan to the Void. After exchanging insults, Wade and Logan fight until Wade falsely promises that the TVA can fix his timeline. The duo, along with Johnny Storm / Human Torch, are captured and sent to Cassandra Nova, whom Logan identifies as the twin sister of Charles Xavier. Upon arriving at Nova's lair, she demonstrates her power to manipulate people's minds and explains her agreement with the TVA to stay in the Void as a gang leader. She kills Johnny after Wade reveals that he insulted her and tries to mentally break Wade with false memories of Vanessa rejecting him. Suddenly, Alioth, a being that devours everything in its path, approaches the base, but Wade and Logan escape before it can consume them.

Logan and Wade meet variants of Deadpool called "Nicepool" and "Dogpool", who give them a car and direct them towards a resistance group who have been fighting against Cassandra. During the car ride, Wade accidentally reveals that he lied to Logan about the TVA fixing his timeline, justifying it by calling it an "educated wish". An infuriated Logan insults Wade over his immaturity and personal failures, leading to another fight until they are both left unconscious. They are found by the resistance group, consisting of Elektra Natchios, Eric Brooks / Blade, Remy LeBeau / Gambit, and X-23 / Laura, the daughter of Earth-10005's Logan. Wade proposes an alliance with the resistance group to fight Cassandra, but Logan refuses to join. However, he changes his mind after a heartfelt conversation with Laura about his inability to save the X-Men in his universe.

Wade, Logan, and the resistance confront Nova and her henchmen together. Nova briefly mentally incapacitates Logan until Wade places Juggernaut's helmet on her to block her powers. Pyro shoots Nova and reveals himself as Paradox's sleeper agent assigned to kill her before Logan knocks him unconscious. Logan persuades Wade to remove the helmet to allow Nova to heal, and in exchange, Nova uses a sling ring from a Doctor Strange variant to open a portal for the duo to travel to Earth-10005 to confront Paradox. Upon arriving, they realize that Paradox has already completed the Time Ripper.

Nova quickly learns about Paradox's plan from Pyro before executing him as she arrives through another portal and kidnaps Paradox. Wade and Logan battle the Deadpool Corps recruited by Nova while she takes control of the Time Ripper to destroy all timelines, leaving only the Void. Nicepool is killed by the Deadpool Corps due to lacking a healing factor as the unaware Wade uses him as a human shield, but the Corps are convinced to relent by Peter, who has donned Wade's previous Deadpool suit and dubbed himself "Peterpool".

Paradox tells Wade and Logan that one of them could destroy the Time Ripper by disrupting its power flow, but doing so would kill them. Wade and Logan destroy the Time Ripper together, killing Nova in the process, and are able to survive by sharing the burden. Paradox is arrested by Hunter B-15 of the TVA, who reveals that the actions of Wade and Logan have saved Earth-10005 from deteriorating. Wade asks Hunter B-15 to save the resistance group from the Void and change the history of Logan's world. She explains that the latter is unnecessary because Logan's history is what led to him being the hero he needed to be. Later, Wade invites Logan to meet his friends. During a gathering that includes Laura and Dogpool, Logan encourages Wade to reconcile with Vanessa.

== Alternate versions ==
=== Weapon XI ===
Similar to Wade Wilson in the original continuity, this version is a soldier and mercenary with enhanced human reflexes and agility and is a member of a black ops group called Team X under the command of William Stryker. Six years later, Wilson was taken to Stryker's base at Three Mile Island where he is experimented on for the Weapon XI project. Stryker dubs him as the "mutant killer" known as the "Deadpool". After freeing the other mutants captured by Stryker in Three Mile Island, a version of Logan is stopped by the now activated Weapon XI. He is then shot several times with adamantium bullets and killed by a time-displaced Wade Wilson, confusing the bystanding Logan. Wilson then proclaims of "just cleaning up the timeline" to Logan before time-traveling.

=== Deadpool & Wolverine ===
Multiple "variants" of Wilson in addition to the revised timeline variant appear in Deadpool & Wolverine (2024).

==== Nicepool ====
Nicepool is an unscarred, good-tempered non-regenerative variant of Wilson, also portrayed by Ryan Reynolds, who was jokingly credited as his made-up identical twin Gordon Reynolds.

===== Controversy =====
The creation of the Nicepool character in Deadpool & Wolverine was called into question after the production of It Ends with Us (2024) became mired in controversy due to disputes between the film's actress Blake Lively and the film's director Justin Baldoni. In December 2024, Lively filed a lawsuit against Baldoni and his production company Wayfarer Studios, accusing them of sexual harassment and intimidation. Denying the allegations, Baldoni sued The New York Times for libel over their siding with Lively's account of events, and later sued Lively, Reynolds and their publicist Leslie Sloan for civil extortion, defamation, and invasion of privacy. Bryan Freedman, Baldoni's attorney in the lawsuit alleged that Reynolds' character of Nicepool in Deadpool & Wolverine was based on Baldoni, given their nearly identical hairstyle and jokes in regards to Lively's Ladypool character and her baby. However, Reynolds has disputed this claim.

==== Dogpool ====
A crossbreed between a Pug and a Chinese Crested Dog, the canine variant of Wilson dubbed Dogpool or Mary Puppins, is played by dog actor Peggy.

==== Deadpool Corps ====
Members of the "Deadpool Corps", an army of 100 Deadpools in service of Cassandra Nova who roam the Void, include:

- A female variant of Wilson dubbed Ladypool, physically portrayed by stuntwoman Christiaan Beattridge and voiced by Reynolds' wife Blake Lively.
- A child variant of Wilson dubbed Kidpool, portrayed by Reynolds' and Lively's daughter Inez Reynolds. She then received her own spin-off comic, Kidpool & Spider-Boy, in which her name is revealed to be Gwen.
- A baby variant of Deadpool dubbed Babypool, portrayed by Reynolds' and Lively's son Olin Reynolds.
- A disembodied Marvel zombie head variant of Wilson, dubbed Headpool, voiced by Nathan Fillion (referencing his previous role as a disembodied zombie head in Santa Clarita Diet) and puppeteered by Geoff Redknap.
- A cowboy variant of Wilson called Cowboypool, portrayed by an uncredited actor and voiced by Matthew McConaughey.
- A Welsh variant dubbed Welshpool, portrayed by Wrexham A.F.C. player Paul Mullin.
- A variant called Canadapool, portrayed by one of Reynolds' stunt doubles, Alex Kyshkovych.
- A variant called Dreadpool (from the Deadpool Killology), portrayed by one of Reynolds' stunt doubles, Antonio Oliveira.
- A calm variant called Zenpool, portrayed by stunt previsualisation coordinator, Kevin Fortin.
- A variant called Haroldpool, portrayed by Harry Holland, the younger brother of Tom Holland, who portrays Peter Parker / Spider-Man in the MCU.
- A samurai variant called Watari / Roninpool, portrayed by stunt performer Hung Dante Dong.
- A future variant called Warda Wilson / Deadpool 2099 who is Deadpool's future daughter, portrayed by stunt performer Ailís Smith.
- Other non-speaking variants include Golden Age Deadpool, Piratepool, Scottishpool, Shortpool, Kingpool, Cupidpool, Greatest Showman Deadpool, Jesterpool, Detectivepool, a hooded Deadpool and a Deadpool with white parts on his suit.

=== What If...? ===
In an alternate universe observed by the Watcher, Deadpool carries a massive arsenal of weapons.

== In other media ==
=== Television ===
- Audio of Reynolds's performance in Deadpool (2016) was used in test footage for a cancelled Deadpool animated series being developed by Donald and Stephen Glover for the television network FXX.
- Ryan Reynolds made an in-character guest appearance to promote Deadpool 2 (2018) on The Late Show with Stephen Colbert, reprising his role as part of the opening monologue for the episode aired on May 16, 2018.
- Reynolds made another in-character appearance to promote the at the time in-production Deadpool & Wolverine (2024) at the 75th Primetime Creative Arts Emmy Awards, accepting the award for Welcome to Wrexham with Rob McElhenney for Outstanding Unstructured Reality Program.

=== Video games ===
- Wade Wilson / Weapon XI appears in the X-Men Origins: Wolverine film tie-in game, voiced by Steven Blum.
- Reynolds reprised his role as Wade Wilson / Deadpool for the iOS and Android mobile game Marvel Strike Force.

=== Web series ===
- Reynolds reprised his role as Wade Wilson / Deadpool by co-narrating the Honest Trailers for Deadpool; Logan, which was the series' 200th video; and Deadpool 2.

=== Music videos ===
- Ryan Reynolds appears in Deadpool costume in a music video for the single "Chk Chk Boom" by the South Korean boy band Stray Kids.
- The music video for "Ashes" by Celine Dion, features Deadpool dancing in high heels, portrayed by Yanis Marshall.

=== Theme parks ===
In 2024, Deadpool made appearances in Avengers Campus at Disney California Adventure and Walt Disney Studios Park. Additionally, the same year the character appeared in the show "Story Time with Deadpool" in Hollywood Land at Disney California Adventure. The holiday version of the show returned to the park in Fall 2025.

== Reception ==
Reynolds's initial portrayal of Wade Wilson / Deadpool / Weapon XI in X-Men Origins: Wolverine received significant critical and fan backlash. Many observed the lack of connection between the film's depiction of the character and his traditional counterpart in the comics. Writing for the Huffington Post in an advance-screening review, Scott Mendelsohn panned the film's depiction of Deadpool and subsequent transformation into Weapon XI, amidst other characters featured in the film from the X-Men comics, affirming that "The climax, for reasons that I won't reveal, will absolutely infuriate devotees of [Deadpool] (for comparison, imagine if, at the end of Spider-Man 3, Eddie Brock turned into The Vulture)". In her retrospective of the film, Rachel Edidin of WIRED described the film's take on the character as "Deadpool, with his mouth sewn shut, which kind of fundamentally misses the point of the Merc with a Mouth", while Collider's Matt Goldberg deemed Wilson's codename of "Weapon XI" as, "a fitting symbol for the film because it's a bunch of mutant powers dumped into a dummy".

In contrast, Reynolds's portrayal of the title character in the standalone Deadpool films was critically acclaimed. Writing for The Guardian, Peter Bradshaw called Deadpool (2016) "the funniest Ryan Reynolds film since Van Wilder: Party Liaison", while going on to observe that "Ryan Reynolds is developing something self-deprecatory and knowing in his handsomeness, a Clooneyesque goof, which works with the comedy here". Manohla Dargis of The New York Times praised Reynolds' subsequent redemption as the character, highlighting the first Deadpool film as proof that "the director, Tim Miller, and Mr. Reynolds can do more than hit the same bombastic notes over and over again", while calling his performance, "career rehab (or penance) for Green Lantern, the 2011 dud he fronted for DC Comics". In his review for Variety, Justin Chang commented on the film's ability to leverage Reynolds' "funnyman sensibilities", going on to exclaim that "through sheer timing, gusto and verve (and an assist from Julian Clarke's deft editing), Reynolds gives all this self-referential potty talk a delirious comic momentum".

== Accolades ==
Reynolds has received numerous nominations and awards for his portrayal of Wade Wilson / Deadpool.

Year	Film	Award	Category	Result	Ref(s)
2009	X-Men Origins: Wolverine	Teen Choice Awards	Choice Movie: Rumble (shared with Hugh Jackman and Liev Schreiber)	Nominated	
2009	X-Men Origins: Wolverine	Scream Awards	Best Supporting Actor	Won	
2009	X-Men Origins: Wolverine	Scream Awards	Fight Scene of the Year (shared with Hugh Jackman and Liev Schreiber)	Nominated	
2010	X-Men Origins: Wolverine	MTV Movie Awards	Best Fight (shared with Hugh Jackman and Liev Schreiber)	Nominated	
2010	X-Men Origins: Wolverine	People's Choice Awards	Favorite On-Screen Team (shared with Daniel Henney, Dominic Monaghan, Hugh Jackman, Liev Schreiber and will.i.am)	Nominated	
2016	Deadpool	Critics' Choice Movie Awards	Best Actor in an Action Movie	Nominated	
2016	Deadpool	Critics' Choice Movie Awards	Best Actor in a Comedy	Won	
2016	Deadpool	MTV Movie Awards	Best Male Performance	Nominated	
2016	Deadpool	MTV Movie Awards	Best Action Performance	Nominated	
2016	Deadpool	MTV Movie Awards	Best Kiss (shared with Morena Baccarin)	Nominated	
2016	Deadpool	MTV Movie Awards	Best Comedic Performance	Won	
2016	Deadpool	MTV Movie Awards	Best Fight (shared with Ed Skrein)	Won	
2016	Deadpool	San Diego Film Critics Society Awards	Best Comedic Performance	Nominated	
2016	Deadpool	Teen Choice Awards	Choice Movie Actor: Action	Nominated	
2016	Deadpool	Teen Choice Awards	Choice Movie: Hissy Fit	Won	
2017	Deadpool	Golden Globe Awards	Best Actor – Motion Picture Musical or Comedy	Nominated	
2017	Deadpool	People's Choice Awards	Favorite Movie Actor	Won	
2017	Deadpool	People's Choice Awards	Favorite Action Movie Actor	Nominated	
2017	Deadpool	Saturn Awards	Best Actor	Won	
2018	Deadpool 2	Teen Choice Awards	Choice Summer Movie Star: Male	Nominated	
2018	Deadpool 2	People's Choice Awards	Favorite Action Movie Star	Nominated	
2018	Deadpool 2	San Diego Film Critics Society	Best Comedic Performance	Nominated	
2019	Deadpool 2	Critics' Choice Movie Awards	Best Actor in a Comedy	Nominated	
2024	Deadpool & Wolverine	Saturn Awards	Best Actor	Nominated	
2024	Deadpool & Wolverine	Critics' Choice Super Awards	Best Actor in a Superhero Movie	Nominated	
