= Cosmeceutical =

Cosmetic products with bioactive ingredients purported to have medical benefits

Cosmeceuticals are cosmetic products containing bioactive ingredients that are claimed to have medical benefits. In the US, there are no legal requirements to prove that these products live up to their claims. The name is a portmanteau of "cosmetics" and "pharmaceuticals". Nutricosmetics are related dietary supplement, foods, or beverage products with additives that are marketed as having appearance-related medical benefits.

Quasi-drug (labelled 医薬部外品 or 薬用) is a Japanese term that refers to many similar products with functional claims, albeit regulation is stricter because pre-market approval from the Ministry of Health, Labour and Welfare is required.

== Criticism ==
Consumers are willing to pay a premium for skin- and hair-care products that they perceive as high-performance. The term "cosmeceutical" is often used in cosmetic advertising and may be misleading to the consumer. If the consumer interprets a "cosmeceutical" or "nutricosmetic" to be similar to a pharmaceutical product, they may conclude that cosmeceuticals are required to undergo the same testing for efficacy and quality control as medications. This may allow the retailer to charge consumers more for a product that may actually be less effective or of poorer quality than perceived.

However, according to the United States Food and Drug Administration (FDA), the Food, Drug, and Cosmetic Act "does not recognize any such category as 'cosmeceuticals'. A product can be a drug, a cosmetic, or a combination of both, but the term "cosmeceutical" has no meaning under the law."

Additionally, the FDA states that "those products that cure, treat, mitigate or prevent disease or that affect the structure or function of the human body" are classified as drugs and, as such, are "subject to an intensive review and approval process by FDA", while "cosmetics are not approved by FDA prior to sale". It further states "If a product has drug properties, it must be approved as a drug."

To avoid inquiry and punitive action by the United States Federal Trade Commission, marketers of cosmeceuticals that are not regulated as drugs by the FDA must label them carefully to avoid making statements which would indicate that the products have drug properties. Any such claims made regarding the product must be substantiated by scientific evidence.

Cosmeceutical manufacturers generally benefit financially when their products are not regulated by the FDA as drugs, because the FDA review process for drugs can be very costly and may not yield a legally marketable product if the FDA denies approval of the product. However, as mentioned above, the reputation of the product may be falsely enhanced if the consumer incorrectly believes that a "cosmeceutical" is held to the same FDA standards as a drug.

Issues surrounding the legal classification of products in this grey area have a long history. At the turn of the 19th and 20th centuries, when legislators were only just beginning to consider the implications of a rigid legal framework, there were numerous court cases concerning products that could today be classified as cosmeceuticals. These often contained essential oils, which, due to their potency, make it difficult for the authorities to reach a clear decision regarding registration (cosmetic or medicinal product).

== See also ==
- Angel dusting
- Cosmetovigilance
- Nutraceutical
