= Angel dusting =

Misleading marketing practice

Angel dusting is the misleading marketing practice of including a minuscule amount of an active ingredient in a cosmetic, cosmeceutical, dietary supplement, food product, or nutraceutical, insufficient to give any measurable benefit. The advertising materials may claim that the ingredient is helpful and that the ingredient is contained in the product, both of which are true. However, no claim is made that the product contains enough of the active ingredient to have an effect – this is just assumed by the purchaser.

== See also ==
- Homeopathy
- False advertising
- List of topics characterized as pseudoscience
