= Pennyroyal =

Pennyroyal may refer to:

== Herbs ==
- Mentha pulegium (pennyroyal or European pennyroyal), a European herb
- Hedeoma pulegioides (American pennyroyal or false pennyroyal), an American herb
- Monardella odoratissima (mountain pennyroyal), mint family plant found in the southwestern and western United States

== Places ==
- Pennyroyal, Victoria, a rural locality in Australia
- Pennyroyal Plateau, also known locally as "Pennyrile", a region of Kentucky in the United States
- Pennyrile Parkway, a highway in Kentucky

== Other ==
- Penny Royal, an AI character from Neal Asher's Polity series
- "Pennyroyal", a song by Joey Badass from 1999
