= No Good Deed (2017 film) =

2017 American short film

- Directed by: David Leitch
- Written by: Rhett Reese; Paul Wernick
- Based on: Deadpool by: Rob Liefeld; Fabian Nicieza
- Starring: Ryan Reynolds; Stan Lee
- Production company: Maximum Effort
- Distributed by: 20th Century Fox
- Release date: March 3, 2017
- Running time: 4 minutes
- Country: United States
- Language: English

No Good Deed is a 2017 American superhero short film featuring the Marvel Comics character Deadpool. The film was directed by David Leitch from a script by Rhett Reese and Paul Wernick, with Ryan Reynolds starring as Deadpool. In No Good Deed, Wade Wilson tries to save an old man from a mugger, but fails because he takes the time to change into his Deadpool costume first.

Shortly before the release of the 2017 film Logan, its theatrical runtime was extended by several minutes due to the addition of a Deadpool short film playing beforehand in place of a traditional post-credits scene. The short was filmed in December 2016 and serves as a tease for the feature film Deadpool 2, but is not a trailer for that film. It plays into Deadpool's characteristic humor in several ways, being based on an absurd premise that would not work in a feature film, having fourth wall-breaking references to Logan, making fun of the character Superman, and featuring a cameo by Stan Lee in one version.

No Good Deed was originally released by 20th Century Fox in front of Logan on March 3, 2017, and an alternate version of the short was released online by Reynolds the following day. Responses to the short praised it as a tease for Deadpool 2 and for showing that Leitch understands the character ahead of directing that film. Its humor was also highlighted by many critics.

== Plot ==
Wade Wilson comes across an old man being mugged in an alley, and races to change into his Deadpool costume before he helps the man. As Wilson struggles to get dressed in a nearby phone booth, the man is shot. Wilson emerges, now as Deadpool, only to find the man dead and the mugger long gone.

== Cast ==
- Ryan Reynolds as Deadpool
- Stan Lee as himself (online version only)

== Production ==
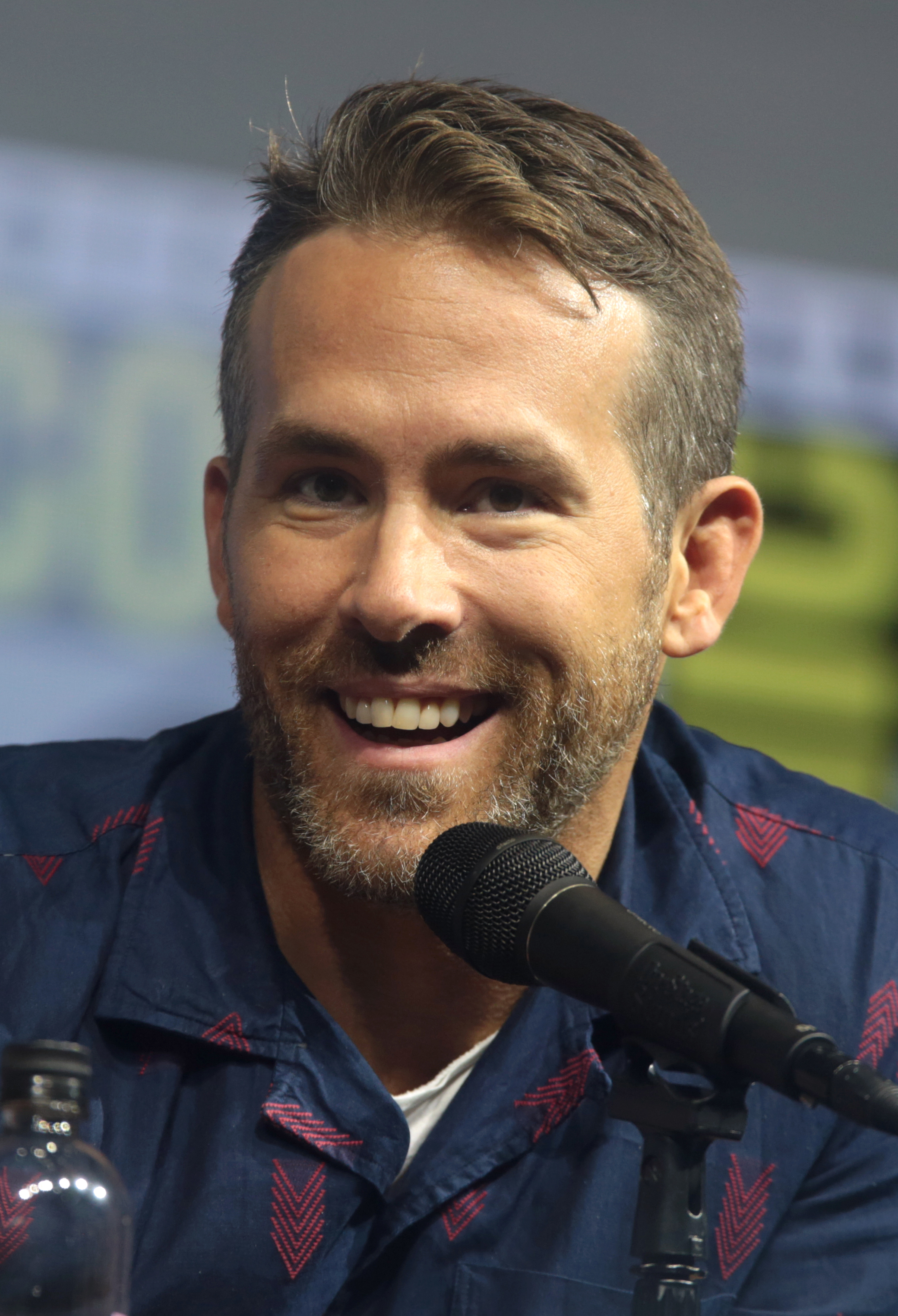
Ryan Reynolds reprises the role of Deadpool from the films.

David Leitch directed a scene featuring Ryan Reynolds as Deadpool in December 2016, which was believed to be intended as a post-credits scene for the 2017 film Logan. This was meant to tease the film Deadpool 2, which Leitch had been hired to direct a month earlier. However, this report was denied by Reynolds, Logan director James Mangold, and star Hugh Jackman. After Logan's runtime was extended by three minutes shortly before its release, there was new speculation that a post-credits scene had been added to tease an upcoming X-Men film, but Mangold denied this again, saying that he wanted to "make a movie that begun and ended on its own terms. There was nothing else to say, because we had said it." Instead, a Deadpool scene was shown as a teaser for Deadpool 2 before Logan, confirmed to be the scene directed by Leitch in December 2016. It was written by Rhett Reese and Paul Wernick, writers of the Deadpool films.

After the initial release, Reese quickly clarified that the scene was not intended to be an official trailer for Deadpool 2, with none of its footage meant to appear in that film, instead being a standalone short film that serves as a "tonal tease" for Deadpool 2. Two slightly different versions of the short were created, with the intention of giving "theater-goers and internet users slightly different treats." For the online release, Reynolds simply titled the short No Good Deed. That version of the short sees Stan Lee make a cameo appearance as himself.

The short parodies Superman, with John Williams's theme from the 1978 film playing as Wilson changes in the booth. It was noted that Leitch's "icy blue" cinematography differed from the style that director Tim Miller used for the first Deadpool, on which Wernick said "every director brings their take to the material" and they were embracing and writing to his style. The writers wanted the opening of the short to feel like the opening of Logan, "so if you were going to see Logan and the first shot came up, you would think it's gonna be Hugh [Jackman] in the hoodie, and then when it turns out to be Deadpool you realize what's going on." They described the short as an absurd one-off "that's probably something that doesn't fit into a movie. It wouldn't work in the logic of a movie, but Deadpool affords us the opportunity to break rules ... the tone can be more absurd if we feel like it's funny. That was our goal there." The short makes several references to Logan: it is set in front of a theater that is showing the film; a poster for the film is seen in the alley; and Deadpool does an impersonation of Jackman's natural Australian accent. At the end of the short, an apparent book report summarizing Ernest Hemingway's The Old Man and the Sea and seemingly written by Deadpool is quickly shown in a text crawl. This was interpreted to be an allusion to Logan and that film's focus on older characters.

== Release ==
No Good Deed was shown in front of Logan in North American theaters beginning March 3, 2017, distributed by 20th Century Fox. The short was only approved for theatrical release in India as intended because the view of Reynolds's buttocks in the short, as Wilson changes into his Deadpool costume, is blurred by the telephone booth windows. Reynolds released the online version of the short on YouTube on March 4, with the video description "Wade and the other girls from the Sisterhood of the Traveling Pants plan a trip to Cabot Cove." Within 48 hours, the video had been viewed over 12 million times. When Deadpool 2 was released to home media in August 2018, No Good Deed was included in the bonus extras under Deadpool's Fun Sack 2.

== Reception ==
Chris Cabin at Collider called the short film "dark, funny, and just a bit punkish", and compared it to a Saturday Night Live skit. He thought it was a smart move from Fox to release "a taste of what [fans] love" about the first film to abate fears and rumors following the replacement of Miller with Leitch. Cabin also said it was impressive and clever that the studio managed to keep the short a surprise for general audiences to discover at the theater. Matt Rooney at JoBlo.com called the teaser great, and "a great way to keep the buzz going for" Deadpool 2 despite not actually revealing anything about that film. Matthew Monagle of ScreenCrush said the short proves that the first Deadpool was "not a one-hit wonder for Reynolds and company", and praised its jokes. He also noted its release with Logan as another connection being made by Fox between its X-Men films and Deadpool, pointing toward future crossovers between the two. The Verge's Andrew Liptak said the short was "a fun one", noting the visual gags in the background and the Stan Lee cameo, and saying, "At the very least, [this shows that] we can expect the same irreverent humor in" Deadpool 2 as was in the first film.

Writing for Screen Rant, Alex Leadbeater felt, regardless of the short's connections to Logan and Deadpool 2, it "ultimately is a good slice of Deadpool fun." Leadbeater also praised the alternate online release, as pirated versions of the theatrical showings had already appeared online and the extra scenes in the official online version were incentive for fans to watch the official release over the illegal ones. Trent Moore of Blastr called the short "a fun little scene", and said that Leitch "certainly seems to have a solid grasp of the irreverent tone that makes the character work so well." Jacob Hall at /Film said the short was a "fun little surprise" and compared it to Marvel Studios's Marvel One-Shots. He added that there is "not much to judge quite yet, but [Leitch] does showcase a strong eye for comedy" in the footage, and particularly noted the "ridiculously depressing and dilapidated" setting. Corey Chichizola of CinemaBlend said the short is "certainly cool enough to whet the palate for any X-Men fans", and particularly noted the "strong blue tint, which is in stark juxtaposition to the very bright and yellow world of Deadpool. With a new director stepping behind the camera, perhaps this was a choice that we'll see in" Deadpool 2.

There was speculation among fans that the murdered old man in the short could be Ben Parker, the uncle of Marvel character Spider-Man who is killed by a mugger as part of that hero's origin story. The speculation noted the way the old man is killed in the short, and the fact that he is carrying Ben & Jerry's ice cream. In response to this, Leitch "coyly" said, "That's a really interesting question", adding, "I think that people should continue to theorize who that old man was."
