= Walter A. McDaniel =

American comic book artist (born 1971)

- Areas: penciller, inker
- Notable works: Deadpool; Deathlok; Spider-Man; Captain America; Batman; Wolverine

Walter A. McDaniel is an American comic book artist who has contributed to titles as Deadpool, Wolverine, Deathlok, Spider-Man, and Batman. He is the founder and CEO of Red Dragon Media (赤龙世漫), a Beijing-based animation studio.

== Interviews in China ==
- 专访原“漫威”画师Walter A. McDaniel：中国的IP产业正在经历变革，用心做中国本土化IP http://www.xinpianchang.com/e1410?from=weibo

- 36Kr对公司首席创意师专访－－浮华年代的情怀梦 http://www.diyitui.com/content-1434497140.31611956.html

== Bibliography ==
=== Marvel Comics ===
- Deadpool #14-21, #23-25, #27 (title artist)
- Wolverine Annual #1
- Punisher ("Back to School" special)
- Deathlok #16-21, #23-25, #27 (title artist)
- Gambit Annual #1
- Captain America - Sentinel of Liberty
- Kazar Annual #1
- Spider-Man #255-258
- Annex
- X-Men

=== DC Comics ===
- Lobo Annual
- Batman ("Joker's Last Laugh" #3)

=== Image Comics ===
- Shadow Hawk #13 and special #1
- The Pact #1-3

=== Hasbro ===
- GI Joe (toy design)
- Transformers
- Valor Vs. Venom

=== Mattel ===
- Hot Wheels (highway 25)

=== Knightstone Comics ===
- Tekken 2
- Tekken Saga, a comic based on the popular Namco fighting game franchise

=== Other publishers ===
- Vampirella (cover artist)
- Earth 4 (pencils; Earth 4 is volume 2 of Urth 4 and published by Continuity Comics in 1993)

=== Midway Games ===
- Mortal Kombat comic

=== Endless Horizons Entertainment ===
- Stark Raven comic
