= Cosmetovigilance =

Monitoring of the safety of cosmetics for human health

Cosmetovigilance is the ongoing and systematic monitoring of the safety of cosmetics in terms of human health. The aim is to detect adverse effects of cosmetic products and prevent them by taking appropriate measures. Regulations for cosmetic products primarily address the safety of products that may be used by large populations of healthy consumers. The identification and analysis of adverse effects related to cosmetic products is a process that remains largely industry-driven. It is the responsibility of manufacturers to determine that products and ingredients are safe before they are marketed, and then to collect reports of adverse reactions.

== Regulatory frameworks ==
=== In the United States ===
The legal basis for monitoring cosmetics in the United States is the Federal Food, Drug, and Cosmetic Act (FFDCA), which defines cosmetics by their intended use, as "articles intended to be rubbed, poured, sprinkled, or sprayed on, introduced into, or otherwise applied to the human body...for cleansing, beautifying, promoting attractiveness, or altering the appearance". Among the products included in this definition are skin moisturizers, perfumes, lipsticks, fingernail polishes, eye and facial makeup preparations, shampoos, permanent waves, hair colors, toothpastes, and deodorants, as well as any material intended for use as a component of a cosmetic product.

In the U.S., state regulation applies in addition to federal regulation. For example, California's governor Arnold Schwarzenegger signed legislation requiring cosmetic producers to report the use of ingredients classified as carcinogenic or toxic to reproduction, a measure primarily aimed at phthalates.

=== In the European Union ===
The legal basis for monitoring cosmetics in the European Union is derived from Cosmetics Directive 76/768/EEC. This 1976 directive requires that cosmetic products "must not cause damage to human health when applied under normal or reasonably foreseeable conditions of use". The safety officer of a company with marketed cosmetics files product information, including a safety report, in electronic or other format to the competent authority of the Member State. This takes place after cosmetic products are placed on the market, with updates made as required by the relevant authority.

The practical consequence of cosmetics legislation is a requirement for continuous observation of cosmetic products after marketing. This applies particularly to "adverse effects" and "serious adverse effects". The European legislation defines "adverse effect" as a negative impact on human health, which is attributable to the normal or reasonably foreseeable use of a cosmetic product. A "serious adverse effect" is one that results in temporary or permanent functional incapacity, disability, hospitalization, congenital anomalies, immediate danger to life, or death.

== See also ==
- Pharmacovigilance
- Cosmeceutical
