= Serving suggestion =

Disclaimer used on food packaging

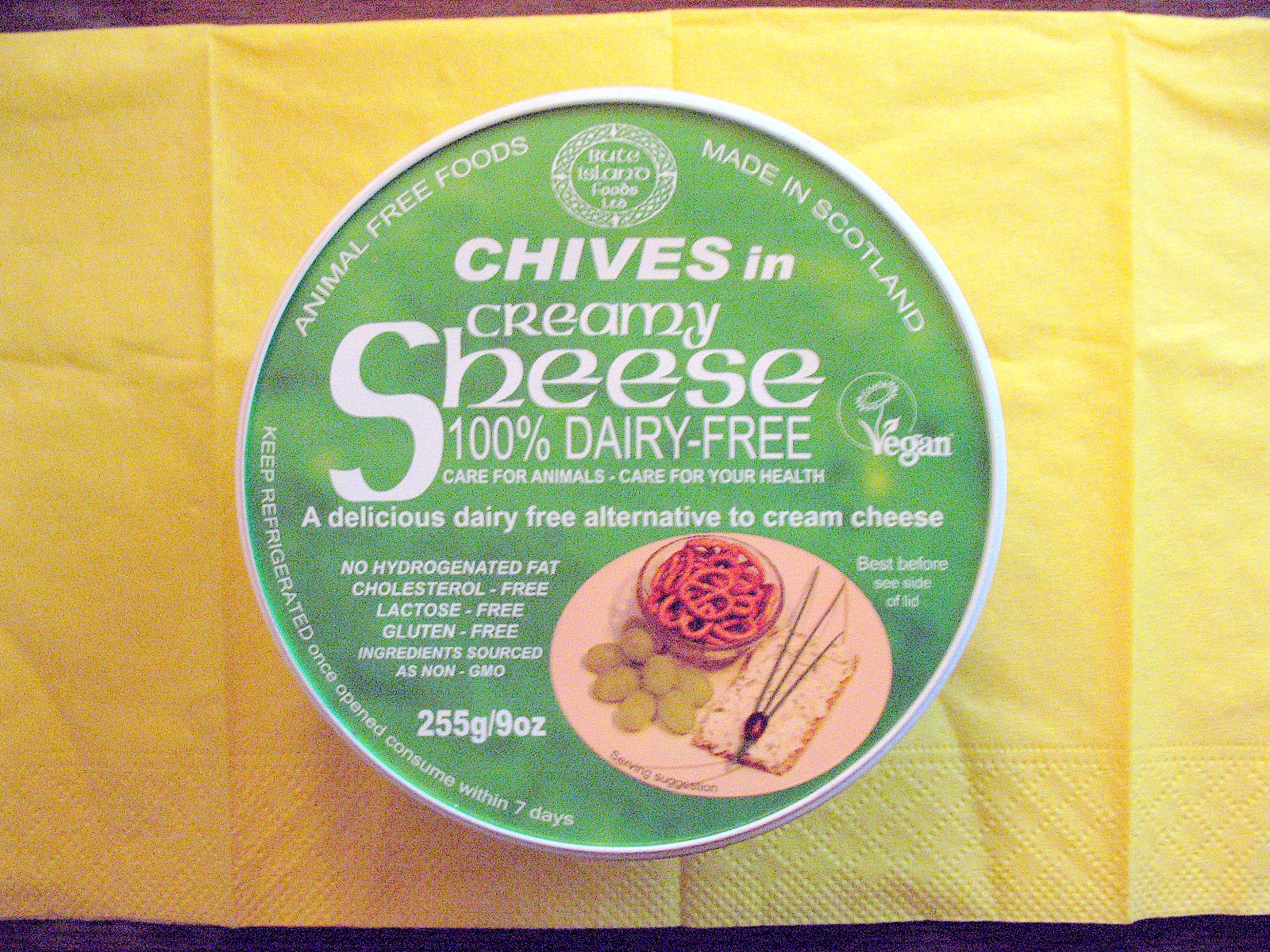
A soy cheese package with a serving suggestion - the product itself is shown smeared on a cracker, accompanied by pretzels and grapes. The text "Serving suggestion" can be seen on the lower border of the serving suggestion image.

Serving suggestion is a disclaimer used on food packaging. The phrase is used as legal fine print with a picture of the product. The photo attempts to portray the manufacturer's food in the most favorable or appetizing way possible, sometimes including other foods that the package does not contain. For example, the labeling on a box of cereal may feature a picture of a cereal bowl filled with that cereal, milk and a fruit garnish, a cream cheese pack may feature a bagel with that cream cheese on it, or a jar of mustard may picture a hot dog in a bun with mustard on it. The serving suggestion may portray the serving size of the food used, but just as often a much larger serving is shown as part of the marketing of the item. As a disclaimer a serving suggestion also serves to remove any legal obligation on the part of the manufacturer to provide the other items pictured with their product.

When used with a cooking recipe, it is a recommendation from the author as a way to serve the dish.
