= Angel Dust (comics) =

Christine Angel Dust

Publication information
- Publisher: Marvel Comics
- First appearance: Morlocks #1 (June 2002)
- Created by: Geoff Johns; Shawn Martinbrough

In-story information
- Alter ego: Christine
- Species: Human mutant
- Team affiliations: Morlocks
- Notable aliases: Angel Dust; Dusty
- Abilities: Ability to enhance her adrenaline levels to gain superhuman strength, speed, agility, and stamina

Christine is a character appearing in American comic books published by Marvel Comics. Created by writer Geoff Johns and artist Shawn Martinbrough, the character first appeared in Morlocks #1 (June 2002). Christine is known under the codename Angel Dust. She is a teenage mutant from Chicago who joined the Morlocks, a community of mutants living underground to avoid persecution. She fled from home when her powers emerged, convinced that her parents would not accept her as a mutant. In time, Christine returned home and was surprised to find that her parents embraced her for who she was.

The character made her live-action debut in Deadpool (2016), portrayed by Gina Carano.

== Publication history ==
Angel Dust debuted in Morlocks #1 (June 2002), and was created by writer Geoff Johns and artist Shawn Martinbrough.

== Fictional character biography ==
Angel Dust is a young mutant who leaves her parents to join the Chicago faction of the Morlocks. She later returns home to reveal her identity to her parents, who accept her, and leaves the Morlocks after helping them take down a Sentinel base. Angel Dust is later among the thousands of mutants who lose their powers to the Scarlet Witch during M-Day.

== Powers and abilities ==
Angel Dust can elevate her adrenaline levels, resulting in a superhuman boost to her speed, strength, agility, and stamina. Her strength ranges from lifting 800 lb (363 kg) to 55,000 lb (25 tonnes), depending on her adrenaline levels. However, her powers are temporary, and she can quickly exhaust herself. When she uses her abilities, dark lines appear on her face.

== In other media ==
Angel Dust appears in Deadpool, portrayed by Gina Carano. This version is a human who was artificially enhanced in the same program that created Deadpool.
