= Nutraceutical =

Marketing term for supplement

Nutraceutical is a marketing term used to imply a pharmaceutical effect from plant extracts, compounds, or food products that are claimed to influence health outcomes, typically as dietary supplements.

In the United States, nutraceuticals are regulated by the Food and Drug Administration (FDA) as foods, dietary supplements or food ingredients, depending on the ingredients included and marketing claims. Regulatory treatment varies by jurisdiction, and the term has no uniform legal definition internationally.

== Regulation ==
Nutraceuticals are treated differently in different jurisdictions.

=== Canada ===
Under Canadian law, a nutraceutical can be marketed as either a food or a dietary supplement; the terms nutraceutical and functional food have no legal distinction.

=== United States ===
The term nutraceutical is not defined by the FDA. Depending on its ingredients and the claims with which it is marketed, a product is regulated as a dietary supplement, food ingredient, or food.

=== India ===
In India, nutraceuticals are regulated by the Food Safety and Standards Authority of India, and a license is required to sell products in this category. Companies have been fined by courts in India for failure to comply with quality control regulations.

=== Quality and safety concerns ===
In the global market, there are significant product quality issues. Those marketing nutraceuticals internationally may claim their products contain certain ingredients, while the lack of regulation means there is no authority guaranteeing the accuracy of such claims, compromising the safety and effectiveness of such products. In the absence of regulation manufacturers and sellers can offer products of low quality or with ineffective or harmful ingredients.

== Classification of nutraceuticals ==
Nutraceuticals are commonly described as products derived from food sources that are claimed to provide health benefits beyond basic nutrition. Depending on the jurisdiction, manufacturers and sellers may claim their products prevent chronic diseases, improve health, delay the aging process, increase life expectancy, or support the structure or function of the body.

=== Dietary supplements ===
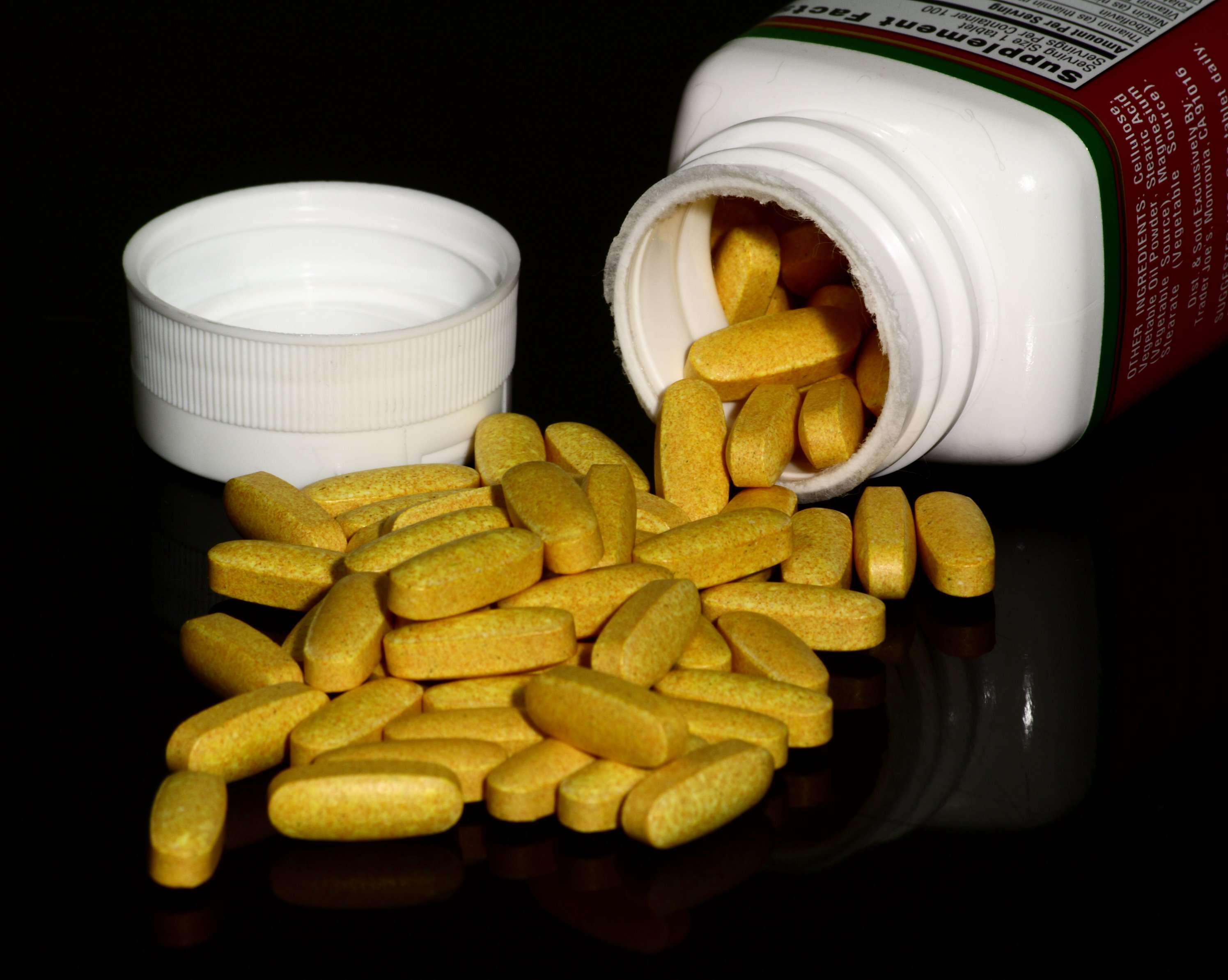
Dietary supplements, such as the vitamin B supplement shown above, are typically sold in pill form.

In the United States, the Dietary Supplement Health and Education Act (DSHEA) of 1994 defined the term "dietary supplement": "A dietary supplement is a product taken by mouth that contains a 'dietary ingredient' intended to supplement the diet. The 'dietary ingredients' in these products may include: vitamins, minerals, herbs or other botanicals, amino acids, and substances such as enzymes, organ tissues, glandulars, and metabolites. Dietary supplements can also be extracts or concentrates, and may be found in many forms such as tablets, capsules, softgels, gelcaps, liquids, or powders."

Dietary supplements do not have to be approved by the FDA before marketing, but companies must register their manufacturing facilities with the FDA and follow current good manufacturing practices. With a few well-defined exceptions, manufacturers and sellers may only claim that a given dietary supplement supports the structure or function of the body, may not claim that it treats a disease or condition, and must include a label that says: “These statements have not been evaluated by the Food and Drug Administration. This product is not intended to diagnose, treat, cure, or prevent any disease.” The exceptions are when the FDA has reviewed and approved a health claim. In those situations the FDA also stipulates the exact wording allowed.

=== Functional foods ===
Functional foods are fortified or enriched during processing and then marketed as providing some benefit to consumers. Sometimes complementary nutrients are added, such as vitamin D to milk.

Health Canada defines functional food as "ordinary food that has components or ingredients added to give it a specific medical or physiological benefit, other than a purely nutritional effect". In Japan, all functional foods must meet three requirements: foods must (1) be present in their naturally occurring form, rather than a capsule, tablet, or powder; (2) be consumed in the diet as often as daily; and (3) regulate a biological process with the aim of preventing or controlling disease.

== Market ==
The modern nutraceutical market developed in Japan during the 1980s. In contrast to the natural herbs and spices used as folk medicine for centuries throughout Asia, the nutraceutical industry grew alongside the expansion of modern technology in the early 21st century.

The market for nutraceuticals is projected to grow to about 614 billion euros per year (approx. US$675 billion; 2023) by 2027.

== Etymology ==
The word "nutraceutical" is a portmanteau of "nutrition" and "pharmaceutical", coined in 1989 by Stephen L. DeFelice.

== Criticism ==
Critics argue that, because the term "nutraceutical" lacks a consistent regulatory definition, some products are marketed with claims that exceed the available clinical evidence. There is no compelling evidence for efficacy in nutraceuticals. After scientists disputed the benefits of nutraceuticals, such as probiotics in yogurt, Danone was forced to pay a large financial penalty for falsely claiming its products Actimel and Activia boosted the immune system.

Some scientists point out that there are no internationally defined properties of nutraceuticals. Due to the vague, undiscriminating evidence for the biological effects of nutraceutical products, few experts have proposed abandoning the term.

== See also ==
- Functional beverage
- Medical food
- Health claims on food labels
- Cosmeceutical for cosmetic products with quasi-medicinal claims
- Probiotic
- Cosmetovigilance
