= Blade (New Line franchise character) =

Film character played by Wesley Snipes

- New Line Cinema's Blade trilogy and Marvel Cinematic Universe character
- Wesley Snipes as Blade in Blade: Trinity (2004)
- First appearance: Blade (1998)
- Last appearance: Deadpool & Wolverine (2024)
- Based on: Blade by: Marv Wolfman; Gene Colan
- Adapted by: David S. Goyer; Stephen Norrington; Guillermo del Toro; Geoff Johns
- Portrayed by: Wesley Snipes (Blade film trilogy, Deadpool & Wolverine); Sticky Fingaz (Blade: The Series); André Hyde-Braithwaite (young; Blade II); Jon Kent Ethridge (young; Blade: The Series)
- Voiced by: Redd Pepper (Blade video game); Tom Clarke Hill (Blade II video game)

In-universe information
- Full name: Eric Brooks
- Species: Dhampir
- Titles: The Daywalker; The Chosen One (Blade); The King of the Vampires
- Occupation: Vampire hunter
- Affiliation: Bloodpack; Nightstalkers; The Resistance; The Last Avengers
- Family: Abraham Whistler (surrogate father); Vanessa Brooks (biological mother); Robert Brooks (biological father)
- Nationality: American

Eric Brooks is a superhero primarily portrayed by Wesley Snipes in the New Line Cinema Blade franchise—based on the Marvel Comics character of the same name—commonly known by his alias, Blade. Brooks is depicted as a dhampir with superhuman abilities after his mother was bitten by a vampire while giving birth to him. Brooks is trained as a vampire hunter by Abraham Whistler and dedicates himself to protecting humanity. A variation of the film's storyline was integrated into Spider-Man: The Animated Series by John Semper in 1995 ahead of the first Blade (1998) film, and Blade's redesigned costume and powers were integrated into comics in 1999. Snipes reprised his role in two further sequel films, Blade II (2002) and Blade: Trinity (2004), as well as in Deadpool & Wolverine (2024), which incorporated his iteration of the character into the Marvel Cinematic Universe (MCU) franchise through the multiverse. The character also appeared in Blade: The Series (2006), portrayed by Sticky Fingaz.

Snipes' portrayal of the character received significant critical praise, described as the "quintessential black superhero [before] Black Panther", with the first film starring him receiving a cult following and beginning Marvel's film success, setting the stage for further comic book film adaptations. Snipes' portrayal of the character won him the Guinness World Record for "longest career as a live action Marvel character" in 2024 with his reprisal of the role in Deadpool & Wolverine.

In 2015, New Line Cinema producers were in talks to have Snipes reprise the role in a crossover with the Underworld film series, but ultimately the concept never came to fruition. In 2019, Mahershala Ali was announced to be cast as Blade in a planned reboot for the MCU before dropping out of the role in 2026.

== Concept and creation ==
My mother named me Eric Brooks. My enemies named me the Daywalker. I named myself for the blade. Sharpened myself into what the world needed me to be. Until the day the monsters won. A world that's already lost doesn't need protectors. It needs a king. Spread the word. From here on out, every last drop of blood in this city——in this world——belongs to Blade.

— Daniel Kibblesmith writing the perspective of the interpretation of the Wesley Snipes version of Blade he created for The Darkhold: Blade.

The character Blade made his first appearance as a supporting character in The Tomb of Dracula #10 (July 1973), written by Marv Wolfman with art by Gene Colan, his first solo story coming in the black-and-white horror-comics magazine Vampire Tales #8 (December 1974), and his first solo series (in color), Blade the Vampire Hunter, being published from July 1994 to April 1995 across ten issues, written by Ian Edginton and Terry Kavanagh, with art by Doug Wheatley.

When New World Pictures bought the rights to Marvel Comics, they were set to make a Mexico-set western starring Richard Roundtree (who would later portray Blade's father in Blade: The Series) as Blade. Marvel Studios then started to develop the film in early as 1992, when rapper/actor LL Cool J was interested in playing the lead role. Blade was eventually set up at New Line Cinema, with David S. Goyer writing the script. When Goyer heard a film was in development he went in to pitch director Ernest Dickerson. New Line originally wanted to do Blade as "something that was almost a spoof" before the writer convinced them otherwise. Goyer wanted to take the character seriously and pitched a trilogy of movies "almost Wagnerian in scope", saying that "I'm going to pitch you the Star Wars of black vampire films", wanting to demystify vampires and treat them as serious villains with a greater sense of realism instead of the doomed romantic characters shown in Anne Rice's Interview with the Vampire. Goyer's vision for the project was to create a "post-modernist vampire film", noting that his initial draft was written before the release of movies with similar approaches such as From Dusk till Dawn and Vampire in Brooklyn. Snipes stated that while such a character "isn't going to lend itself to a great deal of emotional depth", there is also "some acting involved in creating the character and making him believable and palatable".

=== Casting ===
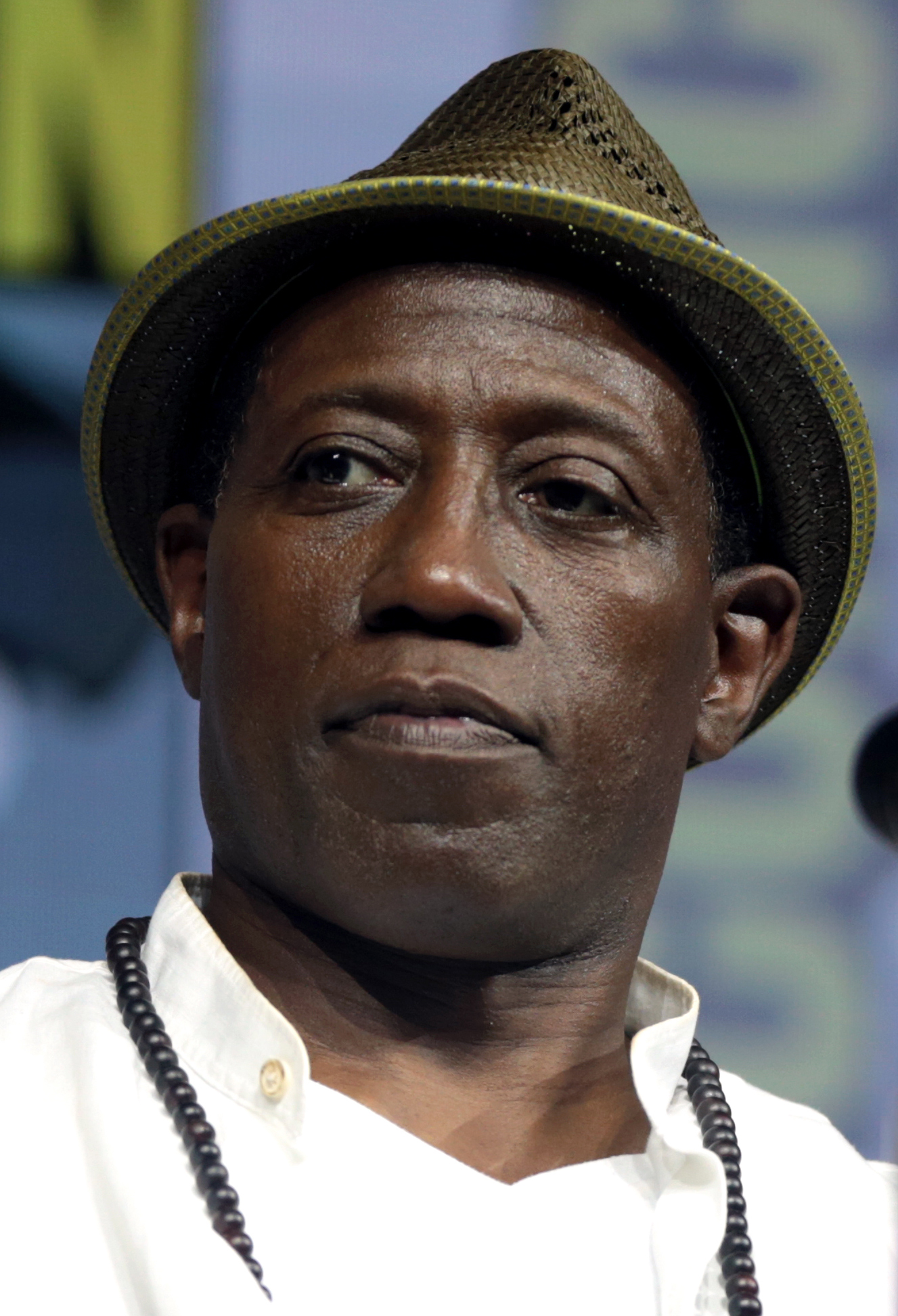
Wesley Snipes speaking at the 2018 San Diego Comic-Con

When Goyer first pitched the idea of doing a Blade film, New Line Cinema asked that Blade and his mentor Jamal Afari both be cast as white instead of black, which Goyer rejected. While the role of Afari was redeveloped as Abraham Whistler, portrayed by white actor Kris Kristofferson, New Line head Mike DeLuca then suggested Denzel Washington, Wesley Snipes, and Laurence Fishburne for the role of Blade; of these three, only Snipes was seriously considered, and had the film's finalized script sent to, as opposed to Washington or Fishburne, who were sent earlier drafts. Having failed to get a Black Panther film starring him into production, Snipes signed on to star as Blade in 1996, the film releasing in 1998, before signing on to reprise his role in Blade II (2002) and Blade: Trinity (2004); in the first film, a young Blade is portrayed by André Hyde-Braithwaite. Kirk "Sticky Fingaz" Jones signed to star as Blade in Blade: The Series, replacing Snipes following Blade: Trinity, with Jon Kent Ethridge portraying a young Blade.

=== Characterization and redesign ===
As created by Marv Wolfman and Gene Colan in 1973, the original comic book version of Blade used teakwood knives and was much more the everyman in his behavior and attitude, wearing red/green clothing and sporting a short afro-style haircut. Although cunning and brave, he displayed flaws as well, such as an inability to get along with certain other supporting cast members and a hatred of vampires that bordered on fanaticism. The character was not originally a "daywalker" but a human being immune to being turned into a vampire. Lacking the superhuman speed and strength of his undead quarry, he relied solely on his wits and skill. Prior to the film's development, Wolfman and Colan had partially revamped the comics character in 1991 with a dark leather jacket, short hair, and more violent tendencies. The 1998 film updated the leather jacket into a body-length coat and added sunglasses, a new haircut, and an enhanced dhampir powerset. The comics character was subsequently modified to match, wearing the new outfit and being bitten by the character Morbius to similarly make him a dhampir like his film counterpart.

Relishing the "challenge [of] stepping back into Blade's shoes" for Blade II, Snipes stated: "I love playing this role. It's fun as an actor to test your skills at doing a sequel, to see if you can recreate something that you did", with Peter Frankfurt adding that "Wesley is Blade; so much of the character was invented by Wesley and his instincts are so spot on. He takes his fighting, his weapons and attitude very seriously. He's incredibly focused, but he's also very cool and fun", and Guillermo del Toro saying that "Wesley knows Blade better than David Goyer, better than me, better than anyone else involved in the franchise, [that he] instinctively knows what the character would and wouldn't do, and every time he twists something around, something better would come out".

However, with Blade: Trinity, Snipes was unhappy with both Goyer's script and original choice of director; when Goyer was selected to replace the director, Snipes additionally protested, reportedly causing difficulty during filming, including frequently refusing to shoot scenes and forcing Goyer to use stand-ins and computer effects to add his character to scenes. Goyer described making the film as "the most personally and professionally difficult and painful thing I've ever been through". Co-star Patton Oswalt alleged that Snipes would spend much of his time smoking marijuana in his trailer, becoming violent with Goyer after accusing him of racism, and refusing to directly interact with Goyer or his co-stars outside of filming, instead communicating with them through his assistant or the use of notes. Snipes also allegedly referred to co-star Ryan Reynolds as a "cracker" on one or more occasions. Snipes denied that version of events and said having been promoted to the role of executive producer on the film, he had the authority to make decisions but that some people had difficulty accepting that.

Addressing Blade's characterization after being cast to replace Snipes in Blade: The Series, Fingaz commented that he was not out to make people forget about the Blade films, saying that "I think it's more my own direction, but I have to incorporate some of what [Snipes] did, [which is] what people are familiar with, and you don't want to change it up drastically. You might want to change the seasoning a little bit, but you want the same meat". Goyer commented on Blade's characterisation in the series as being written as "Wiseguy with vampires", following him after "realiz[ing] at the beginning of the pilot that he's not making much headway, just sort of hacking and slashing, that he needs to know more about [vampire society's] inner workings".

== Abandoned crossover and the Marvel Cinematic Universe ==
In October 2016, Underworld film series star Kate Beckinsale confirmed that a crossover film between Underworld and Blade had been discussed as a sequel to Blade: Trinity, with both her and Snipes returning, but was declined because Marvel Studios had plans to introduce the character into the Marvel Cinematic Universe (MCU). In May 2013, Marvel had a working script for a Blade film. Snipes said in July 2015 that he hoped to reprise the role in any future film and had been in discussions with Marvel Studios about doing so, in an adaptation of the unpublished Blade the Hunter, following Blade and his teenaged daughter Fallon Grey. At the 2019 San Diego Comic-Con held in July, Marvel Studios announced a Blade reboot set in the MCU, with Mahershala Ali cast as the title character, after he had personally pitched a Blade film starring himself to Kevin Feige. Marvel Comics writer Daniel Kibblesmith confirmed that his one-shot comic book The Darkhold: Blade #1 (released in October 2021), illustrated by Federico Sabbatini, Rico Renzi, and Clayton Cowles, follows Snipes' version of the character; presented as a vision given to the Blade of Earth-616 by the titular Darkhold, the narrative follows Snipes' Blade after an alternate ending to the first film where he fails to stop Deacon Frost from using La Magra to make vampires the dominant species on Earth. In July 2026, Ali announced he was no longer set to play Blade in the MCU and criticized Marvel Studios for keeping him under contract for a film he believed they never truly intended to make.

Todd Williams voices Eric Cross Brooks as the Avatar of Khonsu in Marvel Zombies.

== Fictional character biography ==
=== Early life ===
In 1967, the pregnant human Vanessa Brooks is attacked by the vampire Deacon Frost and she goes into premature labor. The doctors are able to save her baby, Eric Brooks, but Vanessa dies. Brooks possesses an eidetic memory; he remembers every moment of his life, beginning with his birth. Thirteen years later, Brooks lives on the streets and preys on other homeless people to fulfill his need for human blood. He meets vampire hunter Abraham Whistler, who becomes Brooks' mentor. Realizing Brooks' is a human-vampire hybrid who possesses the enhanced abilities of vampires without the weaknesses to sunlight, silver and garlic, Whistler trains Brooks in martial arts and the use of various weapons. He also develops a serum to replace Brooks' need to consume blood.

=== Battle against Deacon Frost ===
In 1997, Brooks raids a vampire nightclub in Los Angeles owned by Deacon Frost. The police unknowingly take one of the wounded vampires, Quinn, to the hospital. Quinn kills Dr. Curtis Webb and feeds on hematologist Karen Jenson to regain his strength. Brooks takes Jenson to a safe house where she is treated by Whistler, who explains that they have been waging a secret war against vampires using weapons based on their weaknesses. As Jenson is now destined to become a vampire herself as a result of the bite, both he and Brooks tell her to leave the city. Jenson returns to her apartment and is attacked by Krieger, a police officer. Brooks subdues Krieger and reveals he is a "familiar" (a human loyal to vampires) and uses information from him to locate an archive that contains pages from "The Book of Erebus", the Vampire Nation's holy book. Brooks reveals his origins to Jenson, who is experimenting with the anticoagulant EDTA and synthesizes a vaccine to cure her infection. Frost and his men attack Whistler's hideout, bite him, and abduct Jenson. When Brooks returns, he reluctantly helps Whistler commit suicide.

When Brooks attempts to rescue Jenson from Frost's lair, he finds his mother, who reveals that she became a vampire and was brought in by Frost, who appears and reveals himself as the vampire responsible for Brooks' very existence. Brooks is subdued and taken to the Temple of Eternal Night where Frost plans to drain him of his blood to summon La Magra, an ancient vampire god. Jenson escapes and frees Brooks, allowing him to drink her blood and regain his power. As Frost completes the ritual and obtains the powers of La Magra, Brooks confronts him after killing all of his minions, including his own mother. During their fight, Brooks injects Frost with syringes of EDTA, causing his body to inflate and explode, killing him.

Jenson offers to help Brooks cure himself at the cost of his abilities; instead, he asks her to create an improved version of the serum, so he can continue his crusade against vampires. Months later, Blade confronts a vampire in Moscow.

=== The emergence of the Reapers ===
Two years later, Brooks searches Prague for Whistler, having discovered that he survived his suicide attempt, turned into a vampire, and has been held prisoner by former followers of Frost. Rescuing Whistler and curing him using a long and arduous method of blood transference, Brooks introduces him to Scud, his new technician. Eli Damaskinos, overlord of the Vampire Nation, sends his minion, Asad, and daughter Nyssa, to strike a temporary truce with Brooks, informing him of a pandemic that has been turning vampires into "Reapers", primal vampire-like creatures with a ravenous thirst for blood and a highly infectious bite that transforms both human and vampire alike. Brooks reluctantly allies with the Vampire Nation, teaming up with the Bloodpack, an elite group of vampires originally assembled to kill him. One of their members, Reinhardt, particularly hates Brooks, so he implants an explosive on Reinhardt's head to keep him in line. Meanwhile, he grows close with Nyssa, a natural-born vampire and Damaskinos' daughter, who has never killed a human.

During a battle with Reapers in a vampire nightclub, Brooks discovers that, like him, they are immune to most vampire weaknesses. The Reaper's leader, Jared Nomak, arrives and holds Nyssa hostage, before attempting to recruit Brooks to his cause citing their mutual hatred of vampires. After several of the Bloodpack are killed, Brooks fights Nomak, who discovers he is immune to his silver weapons. As the sun rises, Nomak retreats and Whistler returns, revealing that he has found the Reaper nest in the sewer. Brooks and the Bloodpack also learn the Reapers are weak to silver piercing the heart, but their hearts are encased in bone. They enter the nest and discover the Reaper horde. Brooks saves Nyssa and uses a UV light bomb to kill all of the Reapers except for Nomak. Nyssa is seriously injured until Brooks allows her to drink his blood to survive.

The Vampire Nation betrays and captures Brooks, Whistler, and Scud, revealing that the Reapers exist as a result of Damaskinos' efforts to engineer a stronger breed of vampires resistant to their natural weaknesses. Nomak, the first Reaper, is his own son. Scud reveals himself to be one of Damaskinos' familiars but Brooks, who already suspected this, kills him with the explosive that had been detached from Reinhardt's head. After Damaskinos reveals that he plans to harvest Brooks' blood to give himself immunity to sunlight and create a new breed of vampires, Whistler escapes and frees Brooks, who falls into Damaskinos' blood pool, restoring his strength and allowing him to fight his way through Damaskinos' henchmen and kill Reinhardt. After Nyssa betrays her father, furious at him for hiding Nomak's connection as his son, Nomak bites Nyssa, drinking her blood, before engaging Brooks in battle. Brooks defeats Nomak who kills himself with Brooks' sword. Fulfilling Nyssa's wish of dying as a vampire, Brooks takes her outside and embraces her as she turns to ash.

=== Nightstalkers and the resurrection of Drake ===
After Brooks is tricked into killing a human familiar by the vampire leader Danica Talos, his existence as Blade is exposed to the public and FBI agents locate and raid his hideout, killing Whistler. Demoralized, Brooks surrenders and is arrested. After familiars embedded in the FBI attempt to hand him over to their vampire masters, Brooks is rescued by Hannibal King and Abigail Whistler, Whistler's daughter, who invite him to join their band of vampire hunters, the Nightstalkers, which Whistler had secretly founded without Brooks' knowledge. Brooks learns that Danica, an old enemy of King, has revived Drake, the first vampire and a daywalker like Brooks, with the goal of using his powers to cure vampires of their weaknesses. In addition to being equipped by the Nightstalkers with their newly-innovative UV "Sun dog" ammunition, Brooks learns that they have created an experimental bioweapon known as Daystar, capable of killing vampires at the genetic level and that they believe if they can infect Drake, the virus will kill him and ensure the rest of the species is wiped out, including Brooks.

Eager to test Brooks, Drake isolates him from the Nightstalkers and reveals that he believes both modern humans and vampires are inferior and he intends to wipe them from the Earth, also asking Brooks for help. Drake leads Brooks to a vampire compound where he and Abigail find evidence of the vampires' plans for human subjugation, as well as a network of blood farms where brain dead humans are drained for vampire consumption. Brooks deactivates the farm's life support systems and executes the familiar who had been rounding up homeless humans for vampire consumption.

Returning to the Nightstalkers' hideout, Abigail and Brooks find everyone dead except for King and a young girl, Zoe, both of whom have been taken captive by Danica's forces. After arriving to Danica's base and freeing them, Brooks enters into combat with Drake; losing, he prepares to kill him with his own sword. After Abigail fires an arrow containing the Daystar virus at him, Drake catches it and drops it to the floor by Brooks, not realizing the danger it poses to him. After Abigail shoots Drake with another arrow, wounding him, Brooks uses the distraction to stab Drake with the Daystar arrow, triggering a chemical reaction that completes the virus, releasing it into the air and killing Danica and the rest of the vampires. As Drake slowly succumbs to the virus, he praises Brooks for fighting honorably, but warns him that he will eventually succumb to his need for blood, calling him the future of the vampires. Using the last of his power, Drake shapeshifts into Brooks. The FBI recover the body, but as they begin the autopsy, it transforms back into the deceased Drake. In a post-credits scene, Blade drives his Dodge Charger to places unknown.

In the unrated extended edition, Drake's body in the morgue (as Brooks) does not transform back into Drake; instead, "Brooks" awakens and attacks the doctors and FBI agents present, before menacingly approaches a cowering orderly.

=== Trapped in The Void ===
At some point prior to 2024, the Time Variance Authority (TVA) decides Brooks' universe is on the verge of death. They send him to the Void, a wasteland inhabited by a monster called Alioth, which consumes everything in its path, as well as the ruthless Cassandra Nova. While there, he meets Elektra Natchios, Remy LeBeau / Gambit, Johnny Storm / Human Torch, and Laura / X-23. Their team also included Frank Castle / The Punisher, Peter Maximoff / Quicksilver, Matt Murdock / Daredevil and Erik Lehnsherr / Magneto, but all four died fighting Nova.

One day, Laura brings Wade Wilson / Deadpool and James "Logan" Howlett / Wolverine to their base. Wilson explains that he believes he can force Nova to send him and Logan back to their home universes, and reveals Nova killed Johnny Storm. Brooks and the others agree to join forces with Wilson and Logan to avenge their respective universes. The team sets out for Nova's base, engaging in a fight with Nova's forces with the objective to remove Juggernaut's helmet, which Wilson and Logan use to neutralize Nova's powers. As Alioth approaches the base, Brooks watches Wilson and Logan jump through a portal back to Wilson's home universe, Earth-10005, as he is about to be consumed by Alioth. After saving his universe, Wade asks Hunter B-15 of the TVA to save the others in the Void, leaving Brooks' fate unknown.

== Appearances ==
=== Films ===
Blade is portrayed by Wesley Snipes in four feature films: Stephen Norrington's Blade (1998), Guillermo del Toro's Blade II (2002), David S. Goyer's Blade: Trinity (2004), and the Marvel Cinematic Universe film Deadpool & Wolverine (2024), and by Sticky Fingaz in the television series Blade: The Series, debuting with the television film Blade: House of Chthon on June 28, 2006, and concluding with its thirteenth episode, "Conclave", on September 13.

=== Television series ===
==== Blade: House of Chthon ====
In Blade: House of Chthon, the two-hour television film pilot for Blade: The Series, Blade reluctantly joins forces with the ruthless and beautiful Iraq war veteran Krista Starr, the twin sister of Zack, a familiar murdered by his master Marcus Van Sciver, who apparently plans to develop a vaccine to make those of his kind who survived the Daystar virus indestructible by turning them all into Daywalkers like Blade. Forced to accommodate Krista's need for revenge, Blade also continues to keep his own bloodsucking tendencies in check through daily injections of a new special serum, seeking to counteract the damage left by Drake. After Marcus, smitten with Krista, injects her with his blood to turn her into a vampire, Krista is approached by Blade, who injects her with his own serum and offers her a chance to help him avenge her brother's death and bring down Marcus and the House of Chthon by going undercover in Marcus' organization: Zack is revealed to have been doing a sting operation with Blade. The two form a reluctant partnership.

==== Blade: The Series ====
Following on from Blade: House of Chthon, the events of Blade: The Series follow Blade as he hunts various vampires within and without the House of Chthon, reluctantly reconnects with his estranged biological father Robert, and serves as Krista's handler as she works undercover and struggles to deal with her own hunger for blood and growing predatory nature. Ultimately, Blade discovers that Marcus believes in peace between humans and vampires, believing that they can survive without needing to kill, and that the "vaccine" is actually a virus called the Aurora Project that will specifically target the ruling vampire class of "purebloods", leaving "turnbloods" (normal vampires like Marcus and Krista, who were once human) unscathed. With Blade's help, he eventually unleashes his weapon in the series finale, and Blade looks on at a world finally at peace.

=== Comic book ===
==== The Darkhold: Blade ====
In The Darkhold: Blade, a one-shot following an alternate ending to Blade (1998), Blade fails to kill Deacon Frost before he succeeds in his plan to use La Magra, creating the "V-Wave", which immediately transforms billions worldwide into vampires (including many of Earth's superhumans), leaving the remainders of humanity divided between vampires and their dwindling food supply. While Blade continues his hunt, becoming known as a "boogeyman" to the vampire underworld, killing vampire and familiar alike, his former vampire ally Amadeus Cho is kidnapped by a collection of vampiric former Avengers and returned to the custody of his former master Wilson Fisk, the current "undisputed vampire king of New York City" (who now resembles Pearl). After Amadeus' interrogation by Fisk is interrupted by the failed attack of "the Last Avengers", led by Blade, Blade unleashes an aerosolized silver gas attack upon his penthouse, killing the Kingpin, the Avengers and all other vampires within, before succeeding him as "the king of the vampires".

=== Video games ===
Snipes' Blade appears in several video games based on the film series: Blade, a prequel of the first film published and released by Activision in 2000, with a separate game released for the Game Boy Color later that year, voiced by Redd Pepper, Blade II, released for the PlayStation 2 and Xbox on September 3, 2002 (unlike the other Blade video games, it is a narrative sequel to the film of the same name, taking place between the events of Blade II and Blade: Trinity, in which Blade is voiced by Tom Clarke Hill), and Blade: Trinity, a tie-in Java mobile game starring the character and adapting the film of the same name, developed by Mforma and released in December 2004.

=== Other works ===
In comics, the films have been expanded upon in Blade: Sins of the Father (a prequel to Blade) and The Darkhold: Blade (an alternate ending to Blade).

Snipes' Blade has also appeared in three segments of the parody series Robot Chicken, voiced by Jordan Peele. In "Sesame Street Rave", a parody of the opening scene of Blade, Blade rescues Alex from a rave attended by the cast of Sesame Street, turned into vampires by Count von Count, before killing them all. In "Bob Barker's New Gig", a retired Bob Barker (voiced by Jonathan Lipow) dresses as Snipes' Blade to become a vigilante, spaying and neutering all pets in the city in a parody of Blade, concluding with Snoop Dogg, a werewolf. In "Blade's Blades", Blade kills two vampires before pinning a third to a wall to give him a sales pitch to buy "Blade's Blades" (a variety of specialised knives) from him as part of a multi-level marketing scheme, under the justification that merely being a vampire hunter doesn't pay his bills, before demonstrating his knives' capabilities by using them to block bullets shot by a gun. Impressed, the pinned vampire offers to buy two knives, asking whether or not Blade takes Discover; although insulted, Blade admits that he does, and accepts the payment.

In the television series What We Do in the Shadows, Snipes recurs as a fictionalised version of himself/Blade known as "Wesley the Daywalker", or "Wesley Sykes", a daywalking vampire and member of the Vampiric Council who portrayed the daywalking vampire hunter Blade in films.

== Reception ==
Snipes' portrayal of the character received significant critical praise, with the first film starring him receiving a cult following and the beginning of Marvel's film success, setting the stage for further comic book film adaptations.

== See also ==
- Blade (Marvel Cinematic Universe)
