= Blade: Trinity =

2004 film by David S. Goyer

- Theatrical release poster
- Directed by: David S. Goyer
- Written by: David S. Goyer
- Based on: Blade by: Marv Wolfman; Gene Colan
- Produced by: Peter Frankfurt; Wesley Snipes; David S. Goyer; Lynn Harris
- Starring: Wesley Snipes; Kris Kristofferson; Jessica Biel; Ryan Reynolds; Parker Posey; Natasha Lyonne; Dominic Purcell; Triple H
- Cinematography: Gabriel Beristain
- Edited by: Conrad Smart; Howard E. Smith
- Music by: Ramin Djawadi; The RZA
- Production companies: New Line Cinema; Marvel Enterprises; Amen Ra Films; Imaginary Forces; Shawn Danielle Productions Ltd.
- Distributed by: New Line Cinema
- Release date: December 8, 2004
- Running time: 113 minutes
- Country: United States
- Language: English
- Budget: $65 million
- Box office: $132 million

Blade: Trinity is a 2004 American superhero film based on the Marvel Comics character Blade. It is the sequel to Blade II (2002) and the third and final installment in the Blade franchise. Written and directed by David S. Goyer, it stars Wesley Snipes as Blade, alongside Ryan Reynolds, Jessica Biel, Kris Kristofferson, Dominic Purcell, Parker Posey, and Triple H. Vampire leader Danica Talos has framed Blade for numerous murders, and alongside a team of rogue vampire hunters, he must fight Dracula.

Blade: Trinity was released by New Line Cinema in the United States on December 8, 2004. The film grossed $132 million at the box office worldwide on a budget of $65 million and received mostly negative reviews from critics for its formulaic themes, directing, and acting; it is the worst-reviewed film in the trilogy. The film was followed by a television series, Blade: The Series, in 2006, with Sticky Fingaz replacing Snipes. Marvel regained the film rights to the character in 2012. Snipes reprised his role as Blade in the 2024 film Deadpool & Wolverine, which starred Reynolds as Deadpool. A reboot film set in the Marvel Cinematic Universe has been in development since 2019 and was later believe to be cancelled in 2026.

== Plot ==
A small group of vampires, led by the Talos siblings, Danica and Asher, and their bodyguard Jarko Grimwood, investigate an ancient tomb in the Syrian Desert, which they believe belongs to the first vampire Dracula, also called "Drake". To keep Blade from interfering, they frame him for the murder of a human familiar. FBI agents subsequently locate Blade's hideout and kill his mentor and friend, Abraham Whistler. Demoralized, Blade surrenders and is arrested. The vampires' familiars have arranged for the authorities to turn Blade over to them. He is rescued by Hannibal King and Abigail Whistler, Abraham's daughter, who invite Blade to join their band of vampire hunters, the Nightstalkers. From them, Blade learns that the vampires have revived Drake, intending to use his powers to cure vampires of their weaknesses. As the first of the vampires, Drake can survive in sunlight. Along with newly innovative ultraviolet "sundog" ammunition, the Nightstalkers' blind scientist, Sommerfield, has created an experimental viral bioweapon known as Daystar, capable of killing vampires at the genetic level.

However, to make it effective, they need a pure blood source. Drake is too powerful to kill because he is immune to any vampire weaknesses, including sunlight, so they hope that the virus will kill him and, with his blood in the mix, ensure the rest of the species is wiped out. Eager to test Blade, Drake isolates him from the Nightstalkers. He explains his view that all humans and vampires are inferior in his eyes and that he intends to wipe them out. Abigail finds evidence of the vampires' plans for human subjugation, a network of "blood farms" where brain dead humans are drained of their blood for vampire consumption. Blade deactivates the farm's life support systems and executes the familiar cop who had been rounding up humans for the vampires. Returning to the Nightstalkers' hideout, Abigail and Blade find all of them dead except for King and Zoe, Sommerfield's daughter, both of whom have been taken captive. A recording left by Sommerfield reveals that Drake's blood is all that is needed to make it effective, but she also warns that Blade might be killed, too. King is tortured by the vampires for information, but refuses to talk, even when they threaten to turn him, starve him, and then give him Zoe to feed on.

Blade and Abigail arrive and free the captives. Abigail kills Asher while King kills Jarko. Blade and Drake engage in combat until Drake bests him. As Drake prepares to kill Blade, Abigail fires the Daystar arrow, but Drake catches the arrow before it drops. This distraction allows Blade to stab Drake with the Daystar arrow, triggering a chemical reaction that completes the virus and releases it into the air, killing Danica and all the vampires. As Drake slowly succumbs to his wounds and the virus, he praises Blade for fighting honorably but warns him that he will eventually succumb to his need for blood, acknowledging that Blade is the vampire race's future. Using the last of his power, Drake shape-shifts into Blade, allowing the latter to escape. The FBI recovers the body, but as they begin the autopsy, it transforms back into the deceased Drake.

=== Alternate endings ===
In the unrated extended edition, the body in the morgue does not transform back into Drake. As the autopsy begins, Blade awakens and attacks the forensic team and FBI agents. The scene ends as he menacingly approaches a cowering orderly. King narrates that the virus did not kill Blade, as the human half of his heart did not stop beating; it only slowed down, causing him to enter a comatose state until he was ready to walk the Earth again. In another alternate ending, the Nightstalkers reappear six months later, having tracked a werehyena to a casino in Asia.

== Cast ==
- Wesley Snipes as Eric Brooks / Blade
- Jessica Biel as Abigail Whistler
- Ryan Reynolds as Hannibal King
- Dominic Purcell as Dracula / Drake
- Kris Kristofferson as Abraham Whistler
- Parker Posey as Danica Talos
- Callum Keith Rennie as Asher Talos
- Triple H as Jarko Grimwood
- Natasha Lyonne as Sommerfield
- Ginger "Haili" Page as Zoe
- Mark Berry as Chief Martin Vreede
- John Michael Higgins as Dr. Edgar Vance
- Patton Oswalt as Hedges
- James Remar as FBI Agent Ray Cumberland
- Michael Anthony Rawlins as FBI Agent Wilson Hale
- Christopher Heyerdahl as Caulder
- Scott Heindl as Gedge
- Cascy Beddow as "Flick"
- Paul Anthony as Wolfe
- John Ashker as Campbell
- Eric Bogosian as Bentley Tittle
- Ron Selmour as Dex
- Françoise Yip as Virago
- Kett Turton as "Dingo"
- Michel Cook as SWAT Member

== Production ==
=== Development ===
In 2001, before the release of Blade II, New Line Cinema made a deal with David S. Goyer to write and produce a third Blade film. In 2002, German director Oliver Hirschbiegel was in talks to direct the film, but chose instead to direct a film about Adolf Hitler called Downfall. Goyer, friends with both Stephen Norrington and Guillermo Del Toro, asked for their advice. Del Toro did conceptual artwork for the film and was thanked in the end credits.

In August 2003, Ryan Reynolds was in negotiations to join the film, and Ashley Scott was also being considered as his counterpart, and they would also star in a potential spin-off film. Later that month, Jessica Biel signed on to the project. Producers at New Line Cinema suggested casting professional wrestler Triple H and Goyer was highly skeptical. Goyer was impressed by Triple H's comic timing and self-deprecation and ended up expanding his role. Apple did not pay for product placement. They made the equipment available and included the option to buy it at a 60% reduction.

=== Production troubles ===
Reportedly, Wesley Snipes was unhappy with the film's script and original choice of director. David S. Goyer, who had written all three films in the franchise, was then selected to replace the director of the film, which Snipes also protested. Snipes reportedly caused difficulty during filming, including frequently refusing to shoot scenes, often forcing director Goyer to use stand-ins and computer effects to add his character to scenes. Goyer described making the film as "the most personally and professionally difficult and painful thing I've ever been through". Co-star Patton Oswalt alleged that Snipes would spend much of his time smoking marijuana in his trailer and that he became violent with Goyer after accusing him of racism. It has also been alleged that Snipes refused to interact with the rest of the cast and crew, including Goyer, and would instead communicate with them through his assistant or the use of notes. Snipes also allegedly referred to co-star Ryan Reynolds as a "cracker" on one or more occasions. Snipes denied that version of events and said that as an executive producer on the film he had the authority to make decisions but that some people had difficulty accepting that.

On set, Snipes had found Reynolds' humor a little too over-the-top for Blade: Trinity, but years later thought it made sense in the context of Deadpool. On Deadpool & Wolverine, Snipes enjoyed working with Reynolds, stating, "He's unique in that way, and he's found a fantastic niche for himself doing what he does. Deadpool is Ryan Reynolds all day long. So it was enjoyable. It was enjoyable to work with him. It was enjoyable to revisit."

=== Language ===
In the DVD special features, Goyer talks about how cities are often multilingual. Goyer used Esperanto and its flag as part of the fictional city where Blade is set. The Esperanto flag is shown twice, at the entrance to the Police headquarters after Blade is rescued from jail, and in the rooftop scene where Drake threatens to drop a baby over the edge. Background elements such as signs and advertisements include Esperanto translations. Hannibal King is at one point seen watching the William Shatner-starring Esperanto-language film Incubus on television; one reviewer remarked that it was "an unintentionally apt reference" considering first-time director "Goyer's grasp of directorial fundamentals (such as when to tilt the camera and when to shoot in close-up) is about as strong as Shatner's fluency in Esperanto". The film's director of photography, Gabriel Beristain, makes a cameo appearance as the one-eyed newspaper vendor who talks to Whistler in Esperanto and discusses the public perception that Blade is a menace to society.

== Music ==
A soundtrack containing hip-hop music and electronic music was released on November 23, 2004, by New Line Records. It peaked at #68 on the Top R&B/Hip-Hop Albums and #15 on the Top Soundtracks.

== Release ==
=== Lawsuits ===
In 2005, Snipes sued New Line Cinema and Goyer, claiming that the studio did not pay his full salary, that he was intentionally cut out of casting decisions and the filmmaking process, despite being one of the producers, and that his character's screen time was reduced in favor of co-stars Ryan Reynolds and Jessica Biel. In 2006, Snipes was sued by United Talent Agency for allegedly failing to fulfill agreements to pay commission to the agency on his earnings.

=== Home media ===
New Line Home Entertainment released the film on DVD on April 26, 2005, on both regular and "Unrated" versions. Early copies of both versions included an exclusive comic book titled Blade Nightstalking. The film was released on Blu-ray on June 19, 2012. It contains only the "Unrated" version.

== Reception ==
=== Box office ===
The film's American box office gross was $52 million, and the total worldwide gross was $132 million. This matched the first Blade's take but came behind Blade II, which had grossed $150 million worldwide.

=== Critical response ===
On Rotten Tomatoes, the film has an approval rating of 24% based on reviews from 167 critics, with an average rating of 4.4/10. The website's consensus reads: "Louder, campier, and more incoherent than its predecessors, Blade: Trinity seems content to emphasize style over substance and rehash familiar themes". On Metacritic, the film has a score of 38% based on reviews from 30 critics, indicating "generally unfavorable" reviews. Rotten Tomatoes included the film at 76 out of 94 on a countdown (from 94 to 1) of "worst to best" comic book to film adaptations. Audiences polled by CinemaScore gave the film an average grade of "B+" on an A+ to F scale.

Roger Ebert, who gave Blade three stars out of four and Blade II three and a half stars, gave Blade: Trinity one and a half stars, writing: "It lacks the sharp narrative line and crisp comic-book clarity of the earlier films, and descends too easily into shapeless fight scenes that are chopped into so many cuts that they lack all form or rhythm". James Berardinelli also rated the film one and a half stars out of four: "Blade: Trinity is a carbon copy of its predecessors. It's all kick-ass attitude and style without any substance to back it up. Yet, where the first two Blades satisfied on a visceral level, this one doesn't". Later, David S. Goyer was also very critical about the final product: "I don't think anyone involved in that film had a good experience on that film, certainly I didn't. I don't think anybody involved with that film is happy with the results. It was a very tortured production." The film was nominated for Best Horror Film at the Saturn Awards but lost to Shaun of the Dead.

== Franchise ==
=== Television series ===
A follow-up television series titled Blade: The Series was released in 2006 and ran for one season. It stars Sticky Fingaz as the titular character, replacing Snipes.

=== Cancelled spin-offs ===
In October 2008, Blade director Stephen Norrington was developing a prequel trilogy to Blade, featuring Stephen Dorff reprising his role as Deacon Frost. In 2016, Underworld actress Kate Beckinsale stated that a crossover sequel to Blade: Trinity with the Underworld film series had been in development but was cancelled after the film rights reverted to Marvel Studios in 2012.

=== Marvel Cinematic Universe ===
In May 2013, Marvel had a working script for a new Blade film. Snipes said in July 2015 that he had discussions with Marvel to reprise the role.

In July 2019, at San Diego Comic-Con, Marvel Studios announced a Blade reboot set in the Marvel Cinematic Universe (MCU), with Mahershala Ali as the title character. Blade was originally scheduled to be released on November 7, 2025. In October 2024, the film was delayed and removed from the release schedule. In July 2026, it was announced that the film was canceled. Later that month, Ali confirmed he has "moved on" and was no longer involved with the film.

In 2024, Snipes reprised his role as Blade in Deadpool & Wolverine.

== Video game ==
A tie-in Java mobile game developed by Mforma was released. GameSpot rated it 7.1 out of 10, and IGN gave it 7.7 out of 10.

== See also ==
- Vampire films
