= Djadadjii =

The Djadadjii is a type of vampire hunter in Bulgarian folklore.

According to legend, the Djadadjii's speciality is to find and destroy Bulgarian vampires, the Krvoijac by "bottling" it. First, the vampire hunter takes a bottle and fills it with blood, which they carry with them while they search for the vampire's lair. The Djadadjii usually uses icons of Jesus, the Virgin Mary, or a saint or holy relic for protection and to weed out the Kroijac. When the icon starts to shake s/he knows that the vampire is close.

The Djadadjii will force the vampire into the bottle. Due to its thirst for blood, the Kroijac will enter the bottle if not forced by the holy symbols. Then, the vampire hunter will lock the bottle and throw it into a burning fire. The bottle will break, killing the vampire.
