= Blade II =

2002 film by Guillermo del Toro

- Theatrical release poster
- Directed by: Guillermo del Toro
- Written by: David S. Goyer
- Based on: Blade by: Marv Wolfman; Gene Colan
- Produced by: Peter Frankfurt; Wesley Snipes; Patrick Palmer
- Starring: Wesley Snipes; Kris Kristofferson; Ron Perlman; Leonor Varela; Norman Reedus; Luke Goss
- Cinematography: Gabriel Beristain
- Edited by: Peter Amundson
- Music by: Marco Beltrami
- Production companies: New Line Cinema; Marvel Enterprises; Amen Ra Films
- Distributed by: New Line Cinema
- Release date: March 22, 2002
- Running time: 117 minutes
- Country: United States
- Language: English
- Budget: $54 million
- Box office: $155 million

Blade II is a 2002 American superhero film based on the Marvel Comics character Blade. It is the second installment in the Blade franchise, and sequel to Blade (1998). It was directed by Guillermo del Toro and written by David S. Goyer. The film follows Blade, a human-vampire hybrid, in his continuing effort to protect humans from vampires. Blade must join forces with an elite group of vampires to fight against mutant vampires who plan a global genocide of both vampire and human races.

Blade II was released by New Line Cinema in the United States on March 22, 2002, and was a box office success, grossing $155 million. It received mixed reviews from critics, earning praise for its performances, atmosphere, direction, and action sequences, although its script and lack of character development have been criticized. The film was followed by Blade: Trinity in 2004.

== Plot ==
In Prague, Blade searches for his mentor Abraham Whistler, who was thought dead after being attacked by Deacon Frost (Note: As depicted in Blade (1998)) but was instead turned into a vampire and held prisoner by them for two years. After interrogating vampire Rush on Whistler's whereabouts, Blade rescues Whistler and cures him of his vampirism. Whistler meets Scud, Blade's young, gifted new technician.

A pandemic is turning vampires into "Reapers", primal, mutant creatures with a ravenous thirst for blood and a highly infectious bite that transforms both humans and vampires alike. The original carrier of the Reaper strain and cause of the pandemic is Jared Nomak, who bears hatred toward the vampire race.

To combat the Reapers, vampire overlord Eli Damaskinos sends his trusted servant Asad and his daughter, Nyssa, to strike a truce with Blade. Knowing humans will be the Reapers’ next target after vampires, Blade reluctantly allies himself with them. He teams up with the Bloodpack, an elite group of vampires originally assembled to kill him, consisting of Asad, Nyssa, Reinhardt, Chupa, Snowman, Priest, Verlaine, and her lover, Lighthammer. As Reinhardt openly challenges him to fight, Blade, in response, attaches an explosive to the back of his skull to keep him in line.

They investigate a vampire nightclub where they encounter the Reapers and discover they are immune to most vampire weaknesses except for UV exposure. Nomak arrives and tries to recruit Blade to his cause, but the latter refuses. Blade fights Nomak but cannot kill him due to his immunity to his weapons before the sun rises, and Nomak retreats. Lighthammer is bitten but conceals the bite from the group, while Priest is bitten and in the process of turning before being mercy-killed through exposure to sunlight.

Whistler returns to the group after locating the Reaper nest beneath the sewers. Nyssa dissects a dead Reaper and learns that their hearts are encased in durable bone. Scud and Whistler issue new UV weapons for the team and a UV-emitting bomb to take out the entire nest. Entering the Reaper nest at dawn, Lighthammer transforms into a Reaper and kills Snowman. Verlaine sacrifices herself to kill Lighthammer by exposing them both to sunlight. Chupa turns on Whistler in retaliation for Priest's death, but Whistler secretly releases a cartridge of Reaper pheromones into the air, luring a horde that kills and devours Chupa. Asad and Nyssa are ambushed, and Asad is killed. Blade saves Nyssa and detonates the UV bomb, killing all the Reapers except Nomak. Nyssa and Reinhardt manage to evade the blast, but Nyssa is seriously injured until Blade allows her to drink his blood to survive.

Damaskinos's forces arrive and capture Blade, Whistler, and Scud. Damaskinos reveals that the Reapers exist due to his efforts to engineer a stronger breed of vampires devoid of their natural weaknesses. Nomak, the first Reaper, is his own son, whom Damaskinos considers a failure. Scud reveals himself to be one of Damaskinos's familiars, but Blade, who already suspected this, kills him with the explosive he planted on Reinhardt earlier, which Scud originally thought was a dud until Blade secretly swapped it with a real explosive. He plans to harvest Blade's blood to develop an immunity to sunlight and create a new, invincible breed of vampires. Whistler frees himself, escapes from Reinhardt, and rescues a weakened Blade. Reinhardt shoots at the two, but Blade falls into Damaskinos's blood pool, restoring his strength. He fights his way through Damaskinos's henchmen and kills Reinhardt.

Nomak enters Damaskinos's stronghold, seeking revenge on his father. Nyssa, seeing how her father holds no regard for his own offspring, betrays Damaskinos by sealing off their escape route, and Nomak kills Damaskinos after failing to negotiate with him. Nomak then bites Nyssa, infecting her with the Reaper virus. Blade and Nomak engage in battle, and he manages to stab Nomak through his encased heart. Wanting to end his suffering, Nomak kills himself with Blade's sword. Fulfilling Nyssa's dying wish, Blade takes her outside and embraces her as her body disintegrates from the sunrise. Sometime later in London, Blade tracks down Rush to a strip club booth and kills him.

== Cast ==
- Wesley Snipes as Eric Brooks / Blade: A half-vampire "daywalker" (a Dhampir) who hunts vampires. Wesley Snipes stated that while such a character is not going to have much emotional depth, he also said that "there's some acting involved in creating the character and making him believable and palatable".
- Kris Kristofferson as Abraham Whistler: Blade's human mentor and weaponsmith.
- Norman Reedus as Scud: Blade's weaponsmith in the absence of Whistler.
- Ron Perlman as Dieter Reinhardt: A member of the Bloodpack who bears a particular grudge against Blade
- Leonor Varela as Nyssa Damaskinos: An unapologetic-but-honourable, natural-born vampire and daughter to Damaskinos.
- Thomas Kretschmann as Eli Damaskinos: An ancient vampire who is obsessed with creating a superior race of vampires as his legacy.
- Luke Goss as Jared Nomak: Patient zero and carrier of the Reaper virus. He bears a grudge against his father, Eli Damaskinos, for creating him.
- Matt Schulze as "Chupa": A pugnacious member of the Bloodpack who bears a particular grudge against Whistler
- Danny John-Jules as Asad: A well-mannered member of the Bloodpack
- Donnie Yen as "Snowman": A mute swordsman and member of the Bloodpack
- Karel Roden as Karel Kounen: A familiar, Damaskinos's human agent and lawyer.
- Marit Velle Kile as Verlaine: A red-haired member of the Bloodpack and the lover of Lighthammer. The script originally said that she was the twin sister of Racquel from the first movie.
- Daz Crawford as "Lighthammer": A hulking, hammer-wielding member of the Bloodpack with facial tattoos
- Tony Curran as "Priest": An Irish-accented member of the Bloodpack
- Santiago Segura as "Rush": A vampire flunky in Prague.

== Production ==
Following the success of the original film, New Line Cinema and Marvel Enterprises made plans for a sequel in 1999. Goyer had planned to use Morbius but Marvel wanted to keep the character for a franchise of his own. Goyer compared the story to The Dirty Dozen. Guillermo del Toro was hired to direct Blade II by New Line Cinema production president Michael De Luca after Stephen Norrington turned down the offer to direct the sequel. Goyer and Frankfurt both admired director Guillermo del Toro and believed his dark sensibilities to be ideal for Blade II. Frankfurt first met del Toro when Frankfurt's design company, Imaginary Forces, did the title sequences for Mimic: "I admired Mimic and got to know Guillermo through that film. Both David Goyer and I have been fans of his since Cronos and were enthusiastic about him coming on board. Guillermo is such a visual director and has a very strong sense of how he wants a movie to look. When you sign on with someone like Guillermo, you're not going to tell him what the movie should look like; you're going to let him run with it". Like Goyer, del Toro has a passion for comic books, in Goyer's comment: "Guillermo was weaned on comic books, as was I. I was a huge comic book collector; my brother and I had about twelve thousand comic books that we assembled when we were kids, so I know my background". Tippett Studio provided computer-generated visual effects, including digital doubles of some of the characters, while Steve Johnson and his company XFX were hired to create the prosthetic makeup and animatronic effects.

Del Toro was tired of the romantic concept of "vampires being tortured Victorian heroes" and wanted vampires to be scary again. He chose not to alter the script too much from the ideas created by Goyer and Snipes. According to del Toro: "I wanted the movie to have a feeling of both a comic book and Japanese animation. I resurrected those sources and viewed them again. I dissected most of the dailies from the first movie; I literally grabbed about four boxes of tapes, and one by one, saw every single tape from beginning to end until I perfectly understood where the language of the first film came from. I studied the style of the first one, and I think Norrington used a tremendous narrative style. His work is very elegant."

Stepping back into Blade's shoes was a challenge Wesley Snipes relished: "I love playing this role. It's fun as an actor to test your skills at doing a sequel, to see if you can recreate something that you did". Peter Frankfurt added that "Wesley is Blade; so much of the character was invented by Wesley, and his instincts are so spot on. He takes his fighting, his weapons, and his attitude very seriously. He's incredibly focused, but he's also very cool and fun". Del Toro said that "Wesley knows Blade better than David Goyer, better than me, better than anyone else involved in the franchise. He instinctively knows what the character would and wouldn't do, and every time he twists something around, something better would come out". Filming took place in the Czech Republic, at Prague Studios and Barrandov Studios, as well as London from March 12, 2001, and concluded on July 2 the same year.

== Music ==
A soundtrack to the film was released on March 19, 2002, through Immortal Records and Virgin Records, and featured collaborations between hip hop artists and electronic artists. This soundtrack appeared on four different Billboard charts, reaching number 26 on the Billboard 200. It spawned two singles: "Child of the Wild West" and "Mind What You Say".

== Home media ==
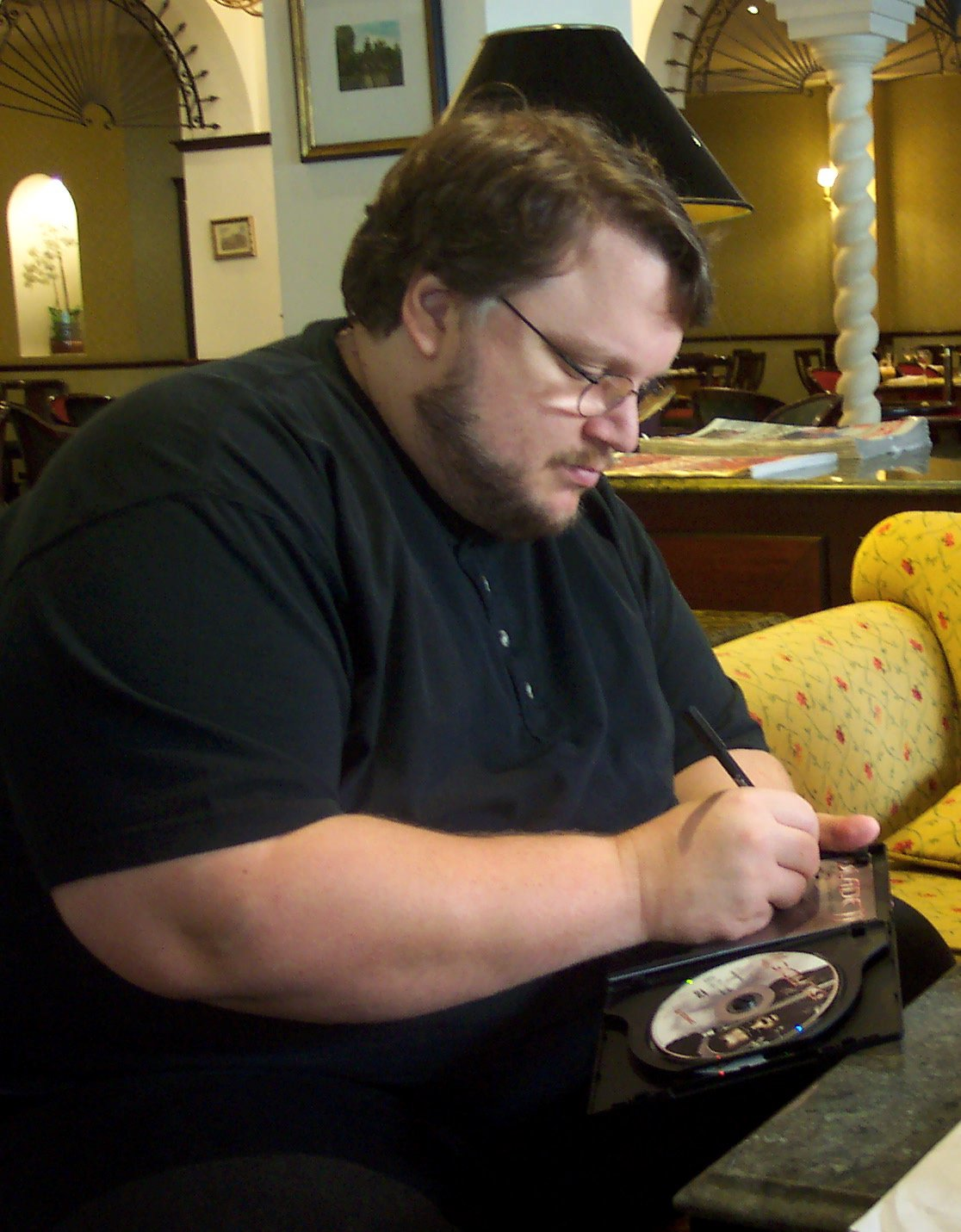
Del Toro signing a DVD copy of Blade II in 2002

The New Line Platinum Series DVD contains several deleted scenes, including a flashback sequence showing Blade's first meeting with Whistler, and a music video for "Child of the Wild West", performed by West Coast hip-hop group Cypress Hill and featuring drum and bass performer Roni Size in the DVD special features on disc 2, VHS Capture, and the theatrical trailer. A Blu-ray version was released in 2012.

== Reception ==
=== Box office ===
Blade II was released on March 22, 2002. This was during a period of the year (months March and April) considered to be a bad time for sequels to be released. Despite this, the film became the highest-grossing film of the Blade series, making $80 million in the United States and $150 million worldwide. In its opening weekend, the film earned $32,528,016 from 2,707 theaters, but dropped 59% of its earnings in its second week, which brought in $13.2 million. The intake is believed to be affected (in part) by the pull of the NCAA basketball Final Four games. The film debuted in the United Kingdom at number one, making $3.6 million from 355 theaters and held the spot for the following week, where it had earned $7.9 million, despite a 47% decline. The film was also number one in Singapore, making $214,000 from 30 theaters.

=== Critical response ===
On Rotten Tomatoes, the film has an approval rating of 57% based on 150 reviews, with an average rating of 6/10. The site's consensus reads: "Though Blade II offers more of what worked in the original, its plot and character development appear to have been left on the cutting room floor." On Metacritic, it has a weighted average score of 52 out of 100 based on reviews from 28 critics, indicating "mixed or average" reviews. Audiences polled by CinemaScore gave the film an average grade of "B+" on an A+ to F scale.

Roger Ebert gave the film three and a half out of four stars, stating: "Blade II is a really rather brilliant vomitorium of viscera, a comic book with dreams of becoming a textbook for mad surgeons". James Berardinelli gave the film two and a half out of four stars: "Blade II is for those undiscriminating movie-goers who want nothing more from a trip to the multiplex than loud, raucous, mindless entertainment".

=== Accolades ===
Like its predecessor, the film was nominated for both Best Horror Film and Best Make-up at the Saturn Awards.

== Video game ==
A video game Blade II was released for the PlayStation 2 and Xbox on September 3, 2002. Reviews were generally negative.

== Sequel ==
A sequel, Blade: Trinity, was released in 2004.

== See also ==
- Vampire film
