= Blade (franchise) =

American media franchise

- The Blade Trilogy DVD box set
- Directed by: Stephen Norrington (Blade); Guillermo del Toro (II); David S. Goyer (Trinity)
- Written by: David S. Goyer
- Based on: Blade by: Marv Wolfman; Gene Colan
- Starring: Wesley Snipes
- Music by: Mark Isham (Blade); Marco Beltrami (II); Ramin Djawadi; The RZA (Trinity)
- Distributed by: New Line Cinema
- Country: United States
- Language: English
- Budget: $164 million
- Box office: $417 million

Blade is an American superhero horror film and television franchise based on the Marvel Comics character of the same name, starring Wesley Snipes as Blade in the film trilogy, and Sticky Fingaz in the television series. The trilogy was directed by Stephen Norrington, Guillermo del Toro, and David S. Goyer, the latter of whom also wrote the films and created the television series. The original films and television series were distributed by New Line Cinema from 1998 to 2006.

The character was created in 1973 for Marvel Comics by writer Marv Wolfman and artist Gene Colan as a supporting character in the 1970s comic The Tomb of Dracula. In the comic, Blade's mother was attacked and bitten by a vampire while she was in labor with Blade, rendering him immune to being turned into a vampire; following the release of the 1998 film Blade, the character was retroactively made into a Dhampir and redesigned to match his movie counterpart. In 2024, Snipes reprised his role as the character in the film Deadpool & Wolverine.

== Films ==
Film	U.S. release date	Director	Screenwriter	Producers
Blade	August 21, 1998	Stephen Norrington	David S. Goyer	Peter Frankfurt, Wesley Snipes, and Robert Engelman
Blade II	March 22, 2002	Guillermo del Toro	David S. Goyer	Peter Frankfurt, Wesley Snipes, and Patrick Palmer
Blade: Trinity	December 8, 2004	David S. Goyer	David S. Goyer	Peter Frankfurt, Wesley Snipes, David S. Goyer, and Lynn Harris

=== Blade (1998) ===
Blade grows up to become a vampire hunter, swearing vengeance on the vampires that killed his mother. He teams up with a man called Whistler, a retired vampire hunter and weapons expert. Meanwhile, in the urban underworld, a feud is started between "pure-blood" vampires and those who had been human, but were "turned". Blade becomes aware of this and investigates further, uncovering a plot to raise the blood god La Magra, something he must stop at all costs.

=== Blade II (2002) ===
A rare mutation has occurred within the vampire community. "Reapers" are vampires so consumed with an insatiable bloodlust that they prey on vampires as well as humans, transforming victims who are unlucky enough to survive into Reapers themselves. Now their quickly expanding population threatens the existence of vampires, and soon there won't be enough humans in the world to satisfy their bloodlust. Blade, Whistler, and an armory expert named Scud are curiously summoned by the Shadow Council. The council reluctantly admits that they are in a dire situation and that they require Blade's assistance. Blade then tenuously allies with The Bloodpack, an elite team of vampires who were trained in all modes of combat to defeat Blade. They'll use their skills instead to help wipe out the Reaper threat. Blade's team and the Bloodpack are the only line of defense that can stop the Reaper population from wiping out the human and vampire populations.

=== Blade: Trinity (2004) ===
In the final installment of the series, the vampires succeed in framing Blade for the killing of a human (who was a familiar being used as bait). Blade, now in the public's eye and wanted by the FBI, is forced to join forces with the Nightstalkers, a human clan of vampire hunters. Blade, Hannibal King, and Abigail Whistler, who goes by the name Danica Talos, have succeeded in locating and resurrecting Drake, also known as Dracula, the first and most powerful vampire by far. Blade releases a virus to end him and all the other vampires, but being a Dhampir (hybrid), the virus also affects Blade with minor health consequences.

== Cancelled projects ==
In October 2008, director Stephen Norrington was confirmed to be developing a prequel trilogy to Blade, featuring Stephen Dorff reprising his role as Deacon Frost. However, by August 2012, the film rights to Blade had reverted to Marvel Studios.

In October 2016, star of the Underworld film series Kate Beckinsale stated that a crossover film between the franchises had been discussed as a sequel to Blade: Trinity with Snipes returning, but was declined because Marvel Studios had plans to introduce the character into the Marvel Cinematic Universe.

=== Marvel Cinematic Universe ===
In May 2013, Marvel had a working script for a new Blade film. Snipes said in July 2015 that he hoped to reprise the role in any future film and had discussed this with Marvel. In 2019, Marvel Studios announced a Blade reboot set in the Marvel Cinematic Universe (MCU), with Mahershala Ali being cast as the title character. It was scheduled to be released on November 7, 2025. In October 2024, Disney removed the film from its release schedule. In July 2026, Marvel Studios president Kevin Feige said he was upset that they were not able to make a Blade film with Ali, believing it to be a "failure". Shortly after, when asked about Feige's comments, Ali said he had moved on from the role, saying, "For whatever reason, that project is not for me. If [Marvel] wanted to do it, we would've done it."

== Television ==
Series	Season	Episodes	Originally released		Creator	Network
Series	Season	Episodes	First released	Last released	Creator	Network
Blade: The Series	1	13	June 28, 2006	September 13, 2006	David S. Goyer	Spike

=== Blade: The Series (2006) ===
In 2006, Spike TV aired a thirteen-episode series set after the events of Blade: Trinity, with Sticky Fingaz portraying Blade, replacing Snipes. Goyer (who wrote the scripts for all three of the films and directed the third film) also created the series.

== Cast and crew ==
=== Cast ===
Character	Films			Television series
Character	Blade	Blade II	Blade: Trinity	Blade: The Series
Character	1998	2002	2004	2006
Blade Eric Brooks / The Daywalker	Wesley Snipes	Wesley Snipes André Hyde-Braithwaite^{Y}	Wesley Snipes	Sticky Fingaz Jon Kent Ethridge^{Y}
Abraham Whistler	Kris Kristofferson	Kris Kristofferson	Kris Kristofferson	Adrian Glynn McMorran
Deacon Frost La Magra	Stephen Dorff	Mentioned		
Dr. Karen Jenson	N'Bushe Wright			
Quinn	Donal Logue			
'Mercury'	Arly Jover			
Vanessa Brooks	Sanaa Lathan			
Racquel	Traci Lords			
Gitano Dragonetti	Udo Kier			
Eli Damaskinos		Thomas Kretschmann		
Jared Nomak		Luke Goss		
'Priest'		Tony Curran		
Nyssa Damaskinos		Leonor Varela		
Dieter Reinhardt		Ron Perlman		
Asad		Danny John-Jules		
'Snowman'		Donnie Yen		
'Chupa'		Matt Schulze		
'Scud'		Norman Reedus		
Dracula / Drake	Mentioned		Dominic Purcell	
Abigail Whistler	Mentioned		Jessica Biel	
Hannibal King			Ryan Reynolds	
Danica Talos			Parker Posey	
Dr. Edgar Vance			John Michael Higgins	
Jarko Grimwood			Triple H	
Asher Talos			Callum Keith Rennie	
FBI Agent Ray Cumberland			James Remar	
Hedges			Patton Oswalt	
Krista Starr				Jill Wagner
Shen				Nelson Lee
Marcus Van Sciver				Neil Jackson
'Chase'				Jessica Gower
FBI Agent Ray Collins				Larry Poindexter

=== Crew ===
Film	Director	Producer	Writer	Composer	Cinematographer	Editor
Blade	Stephen Norrington	Peter Frankfurt; Wesley Snipes; Robert Engelman; Andrew J. Horne	David S. Goyer	Mark Isham	Theo van de Sande	Paul Rubell
Blade II	Guillermo del Toro	Peter Frankfurt; Wesley Snipes; Patrick Palmer	David S. Goyer	Marco Beltrami	Gabriel Beristain	Peter Amundson
Blade: Trinity	David S. Goyer	Peter Frankfurt; Wesley Snipes; David S. Goyer; Lynn Harris	David S. Goyer	Ramin Djawadi; The RZA	Gabriel Beristain	Conrad Smart; Howard E. Smith

== Reception ==
=== Box office performance ===
Film	Release date	Box office gross			All time ranking	Budget	Reference
Film	Release date	North America	Other territories	Worldwide	North America	Budget	Reference
Blade	August 21, 1998	$70,087,718	$61,095,812	$131,211,411	#724	$45 million	
Blade II	March 22, 2002	$82,348,319	$72,661,713	$155,010,032	#558	$54 million	
Blade: Trinity	December 8, 2004	$52,411,906	$76,493,460	$131,977,904	#1,036	$65 million	
Total		$204,847,943	$210,250,985	$418,199,347		$164 million	

=== Critical and public response ===
Critical and public response of Blade
Film	Critical		Public
Film	Rotten Tomatoes	Metacritic	CinemaScore
Blade	59% (114 reviews)	47 (25 reviews)	A−
Blade II	57% (150 reviews)	52 (28 reviews)	B+
Blade: Trinity	24% (167 reviews)	38 (30 reviews)	B+
Blade: The Series	50% (18 reviews)	49 (15 reviews)	—N/a

== Music ==
Year	Title	Chart positions		Certifications (sales thresholds)
Year	Title	U.S.	U.S. R&B	Certifications (sales thresholds)
1998	Blade: Music from and Inspired by the Motion Picture: Released: August 25, 1998; Label: TVT	36	28	US: Gold
2002	Blade II: The Soundtrack: Released: March 19, 2002; Label: Virgin	26	23	
2004	Blade: Trinity (Original Motion Picture Soundtrack): Released: November 23, 2004; Label: New Line	–	68	

== Video games ==
- Blade – based on Blade, released in 2000.
- Blade II – based on Blade II, released in 2002.
- Blade Trinity - based on Blade III, released in 2004 exclusively for mobile phones.
