= Redd Pepper =

Barbadian-British voice actor (born 1961)

- Born: Richardson Green; 23 June 1961 (age 65); Barbados
- Occupation: Voice actor
- Years active: 1996–present

Richardson Green (born 23 June 1961), known professionally as Redd Pepper, is a Barbadian-British voice actor. With his unusually deep voice and vocal style similar to that of Don LaFontaine, he is known for his work on movie trailers, as well as for voicing Michael LeRoi in the 1999 video game Shadow Man, and its sequel, Shadow Man: 2econd Coming.

== Early life ==
Pepper was born Richardson Green in Barbados on 23 June 1961, and moved to London as a child. He has six sisters and three brothers. He attended Sedgehill School in the Lewisham area of London. His first job was at a McDonald's, after which he spent six months as a firefighter. He then became a train driver on the London Underground. He later claimed to have become bored very easily during this job, and would prank passengers by stopping the train between stations, turning off the lights, and talking over the loudspeakers: "I used to say stuff like: 'This is your driver speaking... or is it?' in a really spooky voice."

== Career ==
In 1996, a television executive was a passenger on a London Underground train being driven by Pepper; upon hearing his voice over the loudspeakers, the man gave Pepper his business card and asked Pepper to call him. This led to numerous jobs providing voiceovers for TV channels and adverts, and he began voicing film trailers soon after, with his first being Space Jam. He also voiced Mike LeRoi/Shadow Man in the video game Shadow Man, and its 2002 sequel, Shadow Man: 2econd Coming.

Pepper came to prominence when he was mistaken for Hollywood voice artist Don LaFontaine following his voice work on the trailers for Armageddon and Independence Day. He has also appeared onstage as an actor, having acted in an Edinburgh Festival production of Jeffrey Archer's Prison Diaries. On 24 December 2010, he appeared on a celebrity edition of the BBC quiz show Eggheads. When asked if he missed being a train driver, he responded, "I make £3,000 to £4,000 per movie trailer. What do you think?"

In October 2015, Pepper briefly replaced Peter Dickson as the voiceover of British reality show The X Factor. However, he was only present as a voiceover at Judges' Houses, as Dickson returned at the end of the month. In April 2017, he served as announcer during Bradley Walsh's week of hosting The Nightly Show.

== Personal life ==
Redd is a supporter of football club Aston Villa.

== Filmography ==
=== Film trailers ===
Year	Title	Notes
1996	Independence Day	UK dub
1996	Space Jam	UK dub
1997	The Lost World: Jurassic Park	UK dub
1997	Men in Black	UK dub
1997	Boogie Nights	UK dub
1998	Armageddon	UK dub
1999	The Blair Witch Project	UK dub
2005	Are We There Yet?	UK dub
2007	Are We Done Yet?	UK dub
2007	Mr. Bean's Holiday	UK dub

=== Film ===
Year	Title	Role	Notes
2004	Boo, Zino & the Snurks	Bramph (voice)	English dub
2019	Serenity	Plymouth DJ (voice)	

=== Television ===
Year	Title	Role	Notes
2007	Deadline	Himself	1 episode
2008	The Culture Show	Himself	1 episode
2010	Celebrity Eggheads	Himself	
2011	The One Show	Himself	1 episode
2013	Never Mind the Buzzcocks	Himself	1 episode
2013	Golden Joystick Awards: The Briefing	Narrator	
2014	How to be epic at everything	Himself	1 episode
2014–2015	Ant & Dec's Saturday Night Takeaway	Himself	2 episodes
2015	The X Factor	Announcer	
2017	The Nightly Show	Himself	5 episodes
2017–2019	Pointless Celebrities	Himself	2 episodes
2021	Big Fat Quiz of Everything	Himself	1 episode
2021	Life of a Teddy Bear	Harriet Bear	1 episode
2021	Flamingo Fantasies	Hamilton	28 episodes
2022	Virgin Atlantic TV advert "I Am What I Am"	Passenger reading newspaper	1 advert

=== Video games ===
Year	Title	Role	Ref
1999	Shadow Man	Mike/Shadow Man	
2000	Imperium Galactica II: Alliances	Additional voices	
2000	Blade	Blade	
2000	Gothic	Drax	
2001	Shadow Man: 2econd Coming	Mike/Shadow Man	
2002	Vietcong	Additional voices	
2004	Vietcong: Fist Alpha	Additional voices	
2004	Vietcong: Purple Haze	Additional voices	
2017	Mass Effect: Andromeda	Additional voices	
2023	Baldur's Gate 3	Sarevok Anchev	
2025	Blood West - Dead man's promise DLC	The Shaman	

== See also ==
- Don LaFontaine
- Art Gilmore
