= Flat Earth Productions =

Special effects company

Flat Earth Productions is a visual effects company founded by Kevin Kutchaver, Kevin O'Neill and Doug Beswick in 1995. Early works include the television series Xena: Warrior Princess (1995–2001) and Hercules: The Legendary Journeys; the company then expanded to provide effects for feature films. Kutchaver left the company in 2000 to form HimAnI Productions.

== Information ==
Flat Earth Productions provided effects for Mortal Kombat Annihilation (1997), Blade (1998), and Dungeons and Dragons. The services that Flat Earth Productions provided to such films included:

- 3D Animation
- Stop Motion Animation
- Compositing
- Stereoscopic (3D) Post-production
- On-set Supervision
- VFX Photography
- Complete VFX Consultation
