= Blade (2000 video game) =

2000 video game

- PlayStation cover art
- Developers: HammerHead (PlayStation); HAL Corporation (Game Boy Color); Avit Inc. (Game Boy Color)
- Publisher: Activision
- Directors: Paul Hunter (PlayStation); Andy Ingram (PlayStation); Chris Stanforth (PlayStation)
- Designers: Raoul Barnett (PlayStation); Hiroyuki Sekimoto (Game Boy Color)
- Composer: Kazuo Sawa (Game Boy Color)
- Platforms: Game Boy Color, PlayStation
- Release: NA: November 21, 2000; EU: December 8, 2000 (GBC); EU: December 15, 2000 (PS)
- Genre: Action
- Mode: Single-player

Blade is a 2000 action game based on the 1998 film Blade. It was developed by HammerHead for the PlayStation and by HAL Laboratory and Avit Inc. for the Game Boy Color. It was published by Activision and serves as a prequel to the movie, following the adventure of Blade with help of his mentor and friend Abraham Whistler. Reviews were mixed, with criticism of the graphics, camera, controls, and voice acting.

== Gameplay ==
The player takes control of Blade as he makes his way through various vampire-infested locations in order to defeat the head vampire menace. The player ventures through warehouses, sewers, museums, city streets, and nightclubs dispatching numerous types of enemies ranging from familiars (humans that do a vampire's bidding), vampires, zombies, monsters, killer dogs, and other creatures of the night. Blade has a small arsenal of weapons to arm himself with courtesy of Whistler. Blade has his sword but can use his fists as well as a variety of firearms including pistols, shotguns, and machine pistols. Each firearm has three different types of ammunition: standard, explosive, and silver, each with its own effect on different enemies. Blade is equipped with a "multi-launcher" that can shoot all sorts of things to kill vampires, like silver glaives and UV grenades.

== Plot ==
While investigating a string of grisly murders in Gothic City, Blade is guided to a warehouse run by the Von Esper vampire clan which is located near the city's docks. There, he overhears two warehouse employees discussing a mysterious crate with an "evil aura". Investigating further, Blade boards the cargo ship operated by the Von Espers and kills their leader before escaping a bomb set by a Kobejitsu vampire. Whistler then contacts Blade and the two realize that the Von Espers were working with the Pallintine, surmising that various vampire clans within the House of Erebus are plotting something sinister after learning that the mysterious crate was being shipped by the Pallintine. Blade begins pursuit of the crate which is departing on a freight train.

Successfully intercepting the train, Blade receives a message from Whistler that their operation was a setup just before the train is derailed. Blade arrives in a ravaged Chinatown where he is contacted by Mannheim, the Pallintine Clan's leader, who commands that he kill the leader of the Dragonetti Clan in exchange for the safe release of Whistler, whom they've captured. Blade begrudgingly undertakes the task, entering a temple where he finds a projection of the Dragonetti Clan leader, Gitano. Gitano reveals that the crate the Pallintine were transporting contained a creature called the Night Beast which destroyed Chinatown during its awakening. Learning of the Pallintine's plan to usurp the Dragonetti in the House of Erebus, Blade spares Gitano and in return, Gitano instructs him to make contact with his familiar at the museum while also trying to dissuade him from rescuing Whistler, believing his efforts should be focused on the Night Beast. Blade, however, ignores him and resolves to rescue Whistler.

Fighting his way to the Pallintine Building in Downtown Gothic City, Blade finds and rescues Whistler, learning that the Faustinas Clan are conducting a mystic ritual in the building's penthouse. In the building's penthouse, Blade defeats the twin priestesses of the Faustinas Clan who were attempting to protect the sleeping Night Beast who awakens and critically wounds Blade. Whistler tends to the wounded Blade and fights his way through the Pallantine Building to retrieve blood for Blade so he can heal. Securing the blood and regrouping, Blade and Whistler continue to track the location of the Night Beast, with the former heading to the museum.

At the museum, Gitano's familiar is killed and Blade discovers the Night Beast's origins before facing the creature in an advanced form in the basement. After wounding the Night Beast, Blade follows its trail through the sewers to Pallintine Aerospace where he encounters Mannheim in person. Mannheim explains his true intentions of bringing the Night Beast into the city, hoping to usher in eternal night. Blade questions Mannheim's control over the creature before killing him. Blade then faces the Night Beast, in its final form, finally slaying it with the aid of Whistler's UV Cannon.

Having defeated the Pallintine, Blade refocuses his efforts on tracking Deacon Frost.

== Reception ==
Reception

Aggregate scores
Aggregator	Score	
Aggregator	GBC	PS
GameRankings	72%	48%
Metacritic	N/A	51/100

Review scores
Publication	Score	
Publication	GBC	PS
AllGame	2/5	3/5
Electronic Gaming Monthly	3/10	4.67/10 (Note: Three critics of Electronic Gaming Monthly gave the PlayStation version each a score of 7/10, 4/10, and 3/10.)
EP Daily	N/A	4.5/10
Game Informer	N/A	4/10
GameRevolution	N/A	D+
GameSpot	N/A	4.6/10
IGN	7/10	3.5/10
Next Generation	N/A	2/5
Nintendo Power	7.2/10	N/A
Official U.S. PlayStation Magazine	N/A	2.5/5

The PlayStation version of Blade received mixed reviews according to the review aggregation website Metacritic. David Smith of IGN called it "Much too little much too late. There might have been a good game here once, but not anymore." Samuel Bass of NextGen said, "With the actual film available on DVD for half the price, why waste your time with this inferior spin-off?" Michael "Major Mike" Weigand of GamePro said of the game, "Comic fans looking for a decent game adaptation should stick with Spider-Man. Blade is a kick-ass hero in the comics and movies, but take away the 'kick' and what you're left with adequately describes this game." (Note: GamePro gave the PlayStation version two 2.5/5 scores for graphics and control, 3/5 for sound, and 2/5 for fun factor.)

The Game Boy Color version received more positive reviews. Marc Nix of IGN called it "Violent, visceral, bloody action on the Game Boy Color, just how you like it."

== See also ==
- Blade in video games
