= Abraham Whistler =

Original character created by David S. Goyer

- Blade character
- Kris Kristofferson as Abraham Whistler in the Blade film series.
- First appearance: "Chapter IX: Blade, the Vampire Hunter, Spider-Man: The Animated Series (November 18, 1995)"; Blade (1998)
- Last appearance: "Sacrifice"; Blade: The Series; August 9, 2006
- Portrayed by: Kris Kristofferson (films); Adrian Glynn McMorran (TV series)
- Voiced by: Malcolm McDowell; Oliver Muirhead
- First comic appearance: Blade II #1 – The Official Comic Adaptation (May 2002)
- Created by: David S. Goyer

In-universe information
- Species: Human; Vampire
- Occupation: Vampire hunter
- Affiliation: Blade; Nightstalkers
- Spouse: Unnamed wife
- Children: Two unnamed daughters Abigail Whistler
- Nationality: American

Abraham Whistler is a fictional character appearing in the Blade film and television series. Developing the 1998 film Blade, screenwriter David S. Goyer created the character, and named him after Abraham van Helsing, the nemesis of Count Dracula from Bram Stoker's Dracula (1897). Whistler is a vampire hunter and Blade's mentor. Whistler is an original character created by Goyer, although some comparisons have been made to Jamal Afari who appeared in the comics as Blade's mentor. Kris Kristofferson was cast in the role and later reprised his role in Blade II (2002) and Blade: Trinity (2004). Ahead of Kristofferson's casting and the film's release, Whistler first appeared onscreen in Spider-Man: The Animated Series in 1995, adapted from Goyer's then-unfilmed screenplay, where he was originally voiced by Malcolm McDowell and later by Oliver Muirhead. In Blade: The Series (2006) a young Whistler was played by Adrian Glynn McMorran.

== Development ==
In the Marvel Comics created by Chris Claremont and Tony DeZuniga Blade had a mentor, a jazz musician called Jamal Afari. Developing the 1998 film Blade, screenwriter David S. Goyer wanted Blade to have a mentor and thought of the archetype of "The aging gunfighter who passes down his knowledge. It's the John Wayne character." Marvel liked the Whistler character and before the film had even been made they used him when Blade made a guest appearance in Spider-Man 1994 TV series. This resulted in a legal dispute as New Line Cinema insisted that Marvel did not own the character created by Goyer.

Director Stephen Norrington's first choice to play Whistler was Patrick McGoohan as he was a fan of The Prisoner (1967). Jon Voight was also considered for the role. The casting supervisor suggested Kris Kristofferson and Goyer had been impressed by Kristofferson's work in the 1996 film Lone Star and he ultimately won the role.

Kristofferson has been quoted as saying that beyond the role of mentor, Whistler also serves as a father figure for Blade, citing that his own experience of having eight children helped him prepare for the role immensely.

== Fictional character biography ==
Interior artwork from Blade II: The Official Comic Adaptation #1 (May 2002). Art by Alberto Ponticelli & Tim Bradstreet

Abraham Whistler is a vampire hunter and the mentor of Blade. Abraham Whistler was once a happily married man with two daughters and a beautiful wife. He lived a normal life, and his family lived comfortably, but all of that changed one night when a drifter came, seeking dinner and place to rest for a while before continuing on his way. Whistler let the man in, only to regret that decision for the rest of his life. The drifter was a vampire, and a sadistic one at that. After torturing the family – mainly Whistler – for a while, he then tried to force Whistler to decide in which order his family would die. Whistler refused, struggling to stop the vampire from killing his wife and daughters. He was unable, and a few hours before dawn, the vampire left him with a damaged leg, other injuries, and the drained corpses of his family.

Whistler dedicated himself to hunting down vampires, learning about their ways and customs, and shut himself off from the world. A few years after his family's death, he went to a bar, got drunk, and ended up sleeping with one of the locals. The next morning, he explained to her that he was on the run from a powerful organization, and she would be in danger if they found out she'd been involved with him. He left her with a name and took her number and address, just in case he needed to get in touch with her should something happen. The one night stand resulted in a daughter, whom Whistler learned about not long after her birth. He almost panicked, forcing his one-time lover and daughter to move somewhere else and change their names. He was determined not to lose this new family to the vampires. Certain they were safe, Whistler then left them to fend for themselves after giving them a substantial amount of money he'd earned from stealing from the vampires and their familiars. He checked in on his new family so often but kept them largely ignorant.

Several years later, Whistler met up with a young boy who he'd almost mistaken for a vampire – Eric Brooks, a half-vampire, half-human miracle. He took the Daywalker in, teaching him to use his powers and was able to create a serum to sate the bloodlust Eric suffered. The two of them became a team, Eric taking on the name Blade, and since then they have stayed together and fought the vampires as partners. In the recent years though, Whistler was diagnosed with lung cancer from his smoking, and he realized that without him, Blade would be alone.

Determined Blade wouldn't have to fight the war on his own, Whistler secretly began forming a team of vampire hunters. Around the same time, Abigail Whistler showed up, having tracked down her father, determined to know the man who had left her and her mother alone while occasionally supporting them. Whistler reluctantly told her everything, only to have an even more determined girl on his hands – one that wanted to follow in his footsteps. Seeing it was useless to convince her otherwise, he put her on the team, thankful that she would at least have others with her and he would be able to check up on her.

Later, Whistler was nearly beaten to death by Deacon Frost's goons and shot himself in an attempt to prevent resurrecting as a vampire. His suicide was in vain, though. He came back, only to be kidnapped by the vampires working for Eli Damaskinos, who saw Whistler as a great advantage over the Daywalker and someone who could prove useful. Kept as a prisoner and tortured regularly, Whistler was eventually saved by Blade and given a cure for the vampirism. Whistler wasn't happy about the temporary alliance between Blade and the vampires, and he sensed something between Blade and Nyssa. He also resented Scud but went along with Blade's plan.

== Spider-Man (1994 TV series) ==
Whistler in Spider-Man: The Animated Series.

Abraham Whistler's background in the animated series is the same as that in the films, although he appears younger and unlike the cinematic interpretation of the character does not have long hair and a beard. Whistler was a vampire hunter who took on a young Blade and trained him in martial arts and as a vampire hunter. Blade, who was half-vampire himself, was given a serum developed by Whistler that would stop him from craving human plasma. When Blade hunted Morbius the Living Vampire, a young human student who was accidentally mutated into a vampire-like creature, Blade discovered the Neogenic Recombinator, which could transform humans into vampires. Whistler told him not to destroy it, as it could also be used to cure Blade of his vampirism. Morbius was eventually driven into hibernation.

While Blade was hunting a vampire in Europe, Whistler was visited by the Black Cat, who was looking for help to cure Morbius. Whistler told her that the only way he knew to cure him would be to destroy him and gave her a weapon to do so, but she couldn't bring herself to do it.

== Film ==
=== Blade ===
In the first Blade film it is revealed that Whistler lost his wife and two daughters to an attack by a vampire who had arrived at their home posing as a drifter. Whistler was beaten and tortured, being forced to choose which one of his family died first. These events shaped his hatred of vampires and his mission to destroy as many as he could. Whistler is a weapons expert and master of several martial arts, having a part in creating many of Blade's weapons. When he discovered a thirteen-year-old Blade on the streets preying on the homeless, he took him under his wing. Realizing that he was half human and lacked a vampire's normal weaknesses with the exception of their thirst, he developed a serum to suppress Blade's vampiric lust for blood.

Deacon Frost, an ambitious vampire whom Whistler and Blade had been tracking, located their base and attacked Whistler, causing him to be infected with vampirism. After informing Blade of Frost's plan to resurrect an ancient vampire god, Whistler then seemingly commits suicide, considering death a better fate than becoming a vampire. However, his death is not seen on camera; only the sound of a gun firing is heard.

=== Blade II ===
It is revealed in the second Blade film that Whistler survived his suicide attempt to be kidnapped by another gang of vampires and taken to the Czech Republic. After killing all but one of the vampires responsible for his imprisonment, Blade frees him from suspended animation, taking him to Prague and injecting him with the "cure". During his time with them, he was repeatedly tortured to the point of death, healed, and then tortured again.

Blade, Whistler, and Scud were summoned by the Shadow Council, ruled by overlord Eli Damaskinos, to eradicate the reaper threat. Reinhardt and Chupa (played by Matt Schulze), a friend of Priest who now wishes to kill Whistler to even the score with Blade, corner Whistler, and Chupa proceeds to savagely beat him. Reinhardt leaves the two. Whistler, to save himself, releases the reaper pheromones into the air. As Chupa is about to finish him off with a gun, reapers swarm the sewers and feed on Chupa, allowing Whistler to slip away. During his escape, Whistler is confronted by Jared Nomak, the original Reaper, who lets Whistler live to reveal the truth about the Reaper strain to Blade. When Blade and Whistler are captured by Damaskinos thanks to Scud's betrayal, Whistler manages to escape after Reinhardt underestimates him, rescuing the injured Blade and taking him to a vat of blood so that Blade can be restored to full health to stop Damaskinos's forces and Nomak.

=== Blade: Trinity ===
In the third Blade film, Blade is framed for the murder of several humans. Blade is in the public eye and being hunted by the FBI. In a raid on their new hideout, Whistler set the self-destruct mechanism and seemingly died in an explosion. He is not seen or heard of afterwards (although Drake took the form of Whistler when he attacked the Nightstalkers).

Whistler fathered a daughter out of wedlock or before marriage. This was Abigail Whistler, who eventually tracked down her natural father when she came of age, and asked to be trained as a vampire hunter. Whistler trained her, although he trained her separately from Blade, who was totally unaware that Whistler had any protégés other than himself. Whistler also set up Abigail as the leader of one of the many Nightstalker units he had secretly founded.

== Blade: The Series ==
In Blade: The Series, which takes place after Blade: Trinity, the writers go further into Whistler's background. In the episode "Sacrifice", viewers learn that Whistler got his trademark limp from a young Blade, who escaped his father's house and broke Whistler's leg in an attempt to flee. Blade's father called Whistler in at the urging of a helpful policeman, and Whistler tested him to learn that he was not a regular vampire. He asked Blade's father to give him the boy to use as a weapon against vampires, but Blade ran away before a decision was made. After Blade joined and turned a street gang called the "Bad Bloods", Whistler found him and killed several members of the gang before taking Blade under his wing.

== Reception ==
Kristofferson has been praised for his role as Whistler. Actor Ethan Hawke praised Kristofferson's "pitch-perfect" performance and called it "the grounding wire running through those two popcorn movies." In a 2010 interview Kristofferson said that his role as Whistler was by then "the only one people nowadays identify me with".

In retrospect, some criticized Kristofferson's casting as whitewashing as Whistler replaces Blade's mentor from the comics, Jamal Afari, who was black. At one point before Wesley Snipes had been cast, New Line Cinema even asked if Blade could be white, which Goyer rejected.
