= Blade: The Series =

American superhero television series

- Genre: Superhero
- Based on: Blade by Marv Wolfman and Gene Colan
- Developed by: David S. Goyer
- Starring: Kirk "Sticky" Jones; Jill Wagner; Nelson Lee; Jessica Gower; Neil Jackson
- Composer: Ramin Djawadi
- Country of origin: United States
- Original language: English
- No. of seasons: 1
- No. of episodes: 13

Production
- Executive producers: Jim Rosenthal; Jon Kroll; Geoff Johns; Avi Arad; David Simkins
- Producer: Gordon Mark
- Camera setup: Single-camera setup
- Running time: 46 minutes
- Production companies: Phantom Four Films; Marvel Entertainment; New Line Television

Original release
- Network: Spike
- Release: June 28 – September 13, 2006

Blade: The Series is an American television series created by David S. Goyer for Spike based on the Marvel Comics character Blade. Sharing continuity with New Line Cinema's Blade franchise, it was produced by New Line Television in association with Marvel Entertainment. The series takes place after the events of the film Blade: Trinity (2004) and stars Sticky Fingaz (credited as Kirk "Sticky" Jones) as Eric Brooks / Blade, with Jill Wagner, Neil Jackson, Jessica Gower, and Nelson Lee also starring. The two-hour pilot was directed by Peter O'Fallon from a script by Goyer (who wrote the scripts for all three of the original films) and Geoff Johns.

Blade: The Series premiered on June 28, 2006, and aired for one season, concluding on September 13, 2006. The show received mixed reviews from critics, who praised the action scenes while criticizing a large number of clichés, as well as the absence of Wesley Snipes in the title role.

== Plot ==
Soldier Krista Starr returns from military service in Iraq to learn that her twin brother, Zack, has died in mysterious circumstances. Her investigation reveals Zack had been a "familiar"—a human who serves a vampire in the hope of eventually being rewarded with eternal life. Krista's search leads her to Marcus Van Sciver, Zack's killer, and to Blade, a vampire hunter.

Marcus is a powerful vampire and a high-ranking member of the House of Chthon. Smitten with Krista, Marcus turns her into a vampire by injecting her with his own blood. Krista is then approached by Blade, who injects her with the serum he uses to control his own vampire instincts, offering her a chance to avenge her brother's death and help him bring down Marcus and the House of Chthon. Blade reveals that Zack was helping him with a sting operation, and he and Krista form a reluctant partnership.

The remainder of the season follows Krista's attempts to maintain her cover in the House of Chthon while struggling with her growing predatory nature, and Marcus's work on the Aurora Project, intended to develop a vaccine to render vampires immune to their traditional weaknesses (sunlight, silver, and garlic). It is revealed that Marcus has sabotaged the project and created a virus that is deadly to "purebloods"—the ruling vampire class—and leaves unscathed the "turnbloods"—vampires who were once human. With Blade's help, he eventually unleashes his weapon in the series finale.

== Episodes ==
| No. | Title | Directed by | Written by | Original release date |
|---|---|---|---|---|
| 1 | "Blade: House of Chthon" | Peter O'Fallon | Geoff Johns & David S. Goyer | June 28, 2006 |
| 2 | "Blade: House of Chthon" | Peter O'Fallon | Geoff Johns & David S. Goyer | June 28, 2006 |
| 3 | "Death Goes On" | Michael Robison | David Simkins | July 5, 2006 |
| 4 | "Descent" | John Fawcett | Adam Targum | July 12, 2006 |
| 5 | "Bloodlines" | Felix Enriquez Alcala | Geoff Johns | July 19, 2006 |
| 6 | "The Evil Within" | Michael Robison | Daniel Truly | July 26, 2006 |
| 7 | "Delivery" | Alex Chapple | Barbara Nance | August 2, 2006 |
| 8 | "Sacrifice" | David Straiton | Chris Ruppenthal | August 9, 2006 |
| 9 | "Turn of the Screw" | Norberto Barba | Barbara Nance | August 16, 2006 |
| 10 | "Angels and Demons" | Felix Enriquez Alcala | Adam Targum | August 23, 2006 |
| 11 | "Hunters" | Brad Turner | Geoff Johns | August 30, 2006 |
| 12 | "Monsters" | Ken Girotti | Daniel Truly | September 6, 2006 |
| 13 | "Conclave" | Alex Chapple | David S. Goyer & Daniel Truly & Geoff Johns | September 13, 2006 |

== Cast and characters ==
=== Main ===
- Kirk "Sticky Fingaz" Jones as Eric Brooks / Blade
  - Jon Kent Ethridge as young Eric Brooks
- Jill Wagner as Krista Starr
- Nelson Lee as Shen, Blade's weaponsmith and electronics expert, who hacks computer networks for information on vampires and their business. He makes Blade's serum for him, and can speak and read the vampire language. Blade is helping him track down the vampires who killed his sister.
- Jessica Gower as Chase
- Neil Jackson as Marcus van Sciver

=== Recurring ===
==== Humans ====
- Colin Lawrence as Robert Brooks (younger), the father of Eric Brooks (who becomes Blade). Robert's wife Vanessa having been attacked by the vampire Deacon Frost, Eric was subsequently born half human, half vampire. In flashback scenes, Robert tries to take care of Eric despite problems caused by his craving for blood. Eventually, Eric runs away when he thinks Robert has betrayed him.
  - Richard Roundtree as Robert Brooks (older). When Blade encounters Robert years later, the father tries to make amends for the past, but Blade coldly rejects him.
- Larry Poindexter as Agent Collins, an FBI agent whose family was killed by a serial killer. Initially investigating a series of killings linked to Detective Boone, he becomes aware of the links to vampires.
- Ryan Kennedy as Cain, a former familiar now the most powerful ash dealer in Detroit. His knowledge of the vampire world has allowed him to build a drug empire and make a lot of money selling vampire ash.
- Randy Quaid (uncredited) as Professor Caylo, a disgraced professor whom Krista Starr seeks out while investigating her brother's death. It is Caylo who explains to her that her brother was a familiar from the House of Chthon. He also gives her information about the vampire hunter Blade.
- William MacDonald as Reverend Carlyle, an excommunicated priest who runs a small street ministry catering to drug addicts. Blade goes to him for information, and "donates" money he took from an ash dealer. He betrays Blade to the Bad Bloods, but is himself killed when they no longer need him.
- Elias Toufexis as Officer Donny Flannigan (younger), a police officer in Eric's (the young Blade's) neighborhood, who would find Eric when the boy ran away, and return him to his father. It was Flannigan who introduced Eric's father to Abraham Whistler, who tested the boy. Flannigan helped cover up Eric's killing of the robbers in Mr. Taka's store.
  - Peter Hall as Donny Flannigan (older). Flannigan is killed years later by Steppin' Razor, who is tracking down and killing people from Blade's youth. He is killed in the same manner as one of the robbers.
- Hiro Kanagawa as Mr. Taka, a grocery store owner in Eric's (the young Blade's) neighborhood. Eric would sneak out of his locked bedroom to play chess with Mr. Taka in the park. When Eric ran away from home for good, he went first to Mr. Taka's store, but there interrupted a robbery. Mr. Taka was wounded by the robbers, and Eric's father shot. Enraged, Blade attacked and killed the robbers, before running away for good. In the main narrative, Steppin' Razor kills Mr. Taka after killing Donny Flannigan.
- Tom Butler as Tucker Moffet, an architect and vampire familiar whom Marcus hires to remodel the site of the pureblood conclave to make it ready for dispersal of the Aurora Virus.
- Don Thompson as (Krista Starr's) Uncle Pat. It is Uncle Pat who tells her that her mom is dying. He is killed by Krista's mom after Krista has turned her.
- Sonja Bennett as Vanessa, a young woman approached by Dr. Vonner, ostensibly to serve as a surrogate mother for someone unable to have children. In fact she is incubating the Aurora Virus in her womb. Blade kidnaps her and takes her to a doctor in Paris who removes the virus, rendering her infertile. She is smuggled underground and disappears.
- Andrew McIlroy as Doctor Vonner, an obstetrician hired by Marcus to help engineer the Aurora Virus. He selects young women to implant with a virus incubator instead of an embryo. He had also ran the test lab where Armayan vampires were tortured and experimented on. He commits suicide to avoid being captured by Blade.
- David Kopp as Zach Starr, Krista Starr's recently dead brother. He had been a familiar to Marcus and also worked as a double agent for Blade. Marcus became aware of Zach's betrayal and lured him into a meeting at the docks. Tricked into thinking he was finally going to be turned into a vampire, he was instead shot in the head and his body dumped. Zach appears in Krista's visions, encouraging her to continue his work with Blade.
- Robinne Fanfair as Viola Watkins (younger), a nurse who had once dated Eric's father, Robert. She helped him obtain blood to feed Eric's thirst, sometimes by tapping Robert's own blood.
  - BJ Harrison as Viola Watkins (older) Years later, she is hunted down by Steppin' Razor, who is killing people from Blade's past in order to lure him out. Blade and Shen narrowly save her from drowning, and she tells Blade that his father is still alive and is looking for him.

==== Vampires ====
- Bill Mondy as Detective Brian Boone, a familiar to Marcus. A police officer, he uses his influence to help the vampires cover up their crimes and to secure fresh humans for feeding. He is double-crossed by Marcus and fed to the newly turned Krista Starr, who inadvertently turns him. He escapes and goes on a cross-country killing spree that ends when a group from Chthon ambushes him at a meeting with the House of Armaya. Chase believes she has killed him; in fact he has survived, but is not heard from again.
- Kavan Smith as Alex, a pureblood from the House of Erebus. He is infatuated with Chase, having once been stood up by her. Chase spends a night with him in Las Vegas, but it is a ploy to lure him to Detroit. There, he is subjected to the Aurora Virus, dying in a successful test of its effect on a pureblood.
- David Palffy as Fritz, a vampire who is physically imposing and strong and does Marcus' muscle work. He begs to be a test subject for Aurora, and is injected with the vaccine, gaining immunity to garlic, silver, and sunlight. To test his new power, he engages Blade in a fight, which ends in a draw. Marcus orders him to Prague to display his new talents for the Chthon board of directors. On his way, he is distracted by Blade and goes to fight him. This time, Blade gets the upper hand, and is about to capture Fritz when Krista steps in and beheads him.
- Emily Hirst as Charlotte, a pureblood vampire and senior figure in the House of Chthon. She has journeyed to America to check on Marcus' progress with the Aurora Project. She has the appearance of a child and is often carried by her assistant, Thorne.
- Jody Thompson as Glynnis, a vampire ordered by Charlotte to investigate Marcus and the Aurora Project. She discovers that Marcus is misappropriating money and also that Krista is working for Blade. She interrupts Krista just after the latter has turned her own mother, and is ashed when Krista pierces her heart with a silver-backed mirror.
- Ryan Robbins as Sands, a vampire from the House of Erebus who had been captured by Marcus and used in the Aurora experiments. For reasons left unexplained, his scars never healed and he was left disfigured. Sands leads Blade to the testing facility, and in return Blade lets him go. Eventually, Sands finds his way to Damek and tells him what Marcus has been doing to the Armayan vampires. He is last seen getting into Damek's limousine.
- Bokeem Woodbine as Steppin' Razor. A hardcore killer and the leader of the Bad Bloods street gang, he had taken Eric in after he ran away from his father. Blade had turned him into a vampire. — One night, Blade was overcome by the blood thirst and bit several gang members, turning them. Having been turned by the Daywalker, they were not accepted by any of the vampire houses. — In the main narrative, SR reappears years later and begins tracking down and killing people from Blade's past, in order to draw him out and take his revenge. He finds Blade's father and lures Blade to his childhood home for a final confrontation.
- John DeSantis as Thorne, Charlotte's Lurch-like servant. He carries Charlotte around and attends to her every need. When he captures Chase and brings her to Charlotte, the latter tells Chase that Thorne only likes human women and has "quite an impressive collection". Thorne is habitually silent and only speaks in his final confrontation with Blade, to say "I want to hear you scream".
- Scott Heindl as the White Prince, an insane rogue vampire, unaffiliated with any house. A serial killer who emerges every 19 years to kidnap and torture his victims, his face has been permanently scarred by silver. Shen and Blade get wind of him when his familiar kidnaps several girls from a night club.

== Production ==
In February 2006, Spike TV gave the green light for a television series based on Marvel Comics superhero Blade as the network's first original scripted series. Spike TV executive Pancho Mansfield said: "We're extremely pleased with the pilot for Blade, which delivers a thrilling action-adventure for its built-in fan base as well as a character-driven drama filled with heart-pounding tension and suspense. The series will be the first of our scripted fare as we embark on creating a greater mix of original programming for our viewers".

David S. Goyer, who had written the scripts for all three of the films and created the television series, commented that the open-ended nature of a TV series supported the kind of storytelling that allows viewers to delve more into the inner workings of the vampire world.

Rapper Sticky Fingaz signed to star as Blade in November 2005, replacing Wesley Snipes, who had portrayed Blade in the movies. Fingaz later commented that he was not out to make people forget about the Blade films, but wanted to put his own spin on the character: "I think it's more my own direction, but I have to incorporate some of what [Snipes] did. That's what people are familiar with, and you don't want to change it up drastically. You might want to change the seasoning a little bit, but you want the same meat".

Spike TV ordered 11 one-hour episodes, in addition to the two-hour pilot episode, to be produced by New Line Television. The pilot was shot in 2005, and production of the series began in Vancouver in the spring of 2006. The show premiered with the pilot on June 28, 2006, followed by standard one-hour episodes from July 5.

In the chronology of the Blade film series, the TV series takes place after the film Blade: Trinity (2004): certain events in the film are mentioned in the pilot episode. The series adds several new characters, including Krista Starr (played by Jill Wagner), Marcus van Sciver (Neil Jackson), Chase (Jessica Gower) and Shen (Nelson Lee). Goyer later explained: "What the series is, in a weird way, is kind of like Wiseguy with vampires, because Jill's character is kind of a double agent working for Blade, within the vampire community, and [we're] treating the vampires sort of like the ultimate crime family. Blade realizes at the beginning of the pilot that he's not making much headway, just sort of hacking and slashing, that he needs to know more about their inner workings".

== Reception ==
=== Ratings ===
The series premiere had 2.5 million viewers and was the most-watched original series premiere in Spike TV history. It was also the #1 show on evening cable TV for men 18–34 and 18–49. This occurred in a year where most cable premieres were outstanding, and the series failed to hold its numbers.

=== Critical response ===
On Rotten Tomatoes the series had an approval rating of 50% based on reviews from 18 critics. The site's consensus was "Blade: The Series emphasizes gore and techno music over dramatic development, making for a bland action series". On Metacritic, the series has a score of 49% based on reviews from 15 critics, indicating "mixed or average reviews".

Gillian Flynn of Entertainment Weekly gave it a positive review and wrote: "When gunplay, kickboxing, and throat slitting actually feel like breaks in the action, you've got a series with brains as well as teeth". The Guardian wrote: "Like most genre shows, it fumbles a lot in setting up the world and characters, but stick with it: after a few weeks it hits its stride and is a good antidote to the rather soppy bloodsuckers of True Blood and Twilight".

Brian Lowry of Variety wrote that the series "feels more like a bland swig of plasma than the bloody romp that it ought to be". Reviewing the series in 2017, Liz Shannon Miller of IndieWire was critical of the show: "Despite some interesting twists at the end, the cliches did pile up" and the absence of Wesley Snipes.

== Cancellation ==
On September 28, 2006, Jill Wagner announced that there would be no second season of the show. The next day, Spike announced in a press release that the show would not be picked up. As a response to a letter in Wizard Magazine, series writer/producer Geoff Johns stated that "the network didn't want to cancel it, I just think Spike TV is still a young network, and the price it was costing to make...they just weren't able to do it".

== Home media ==
=== iTunes and DVD ===
Blade: The Series was the second TV show to premiere on iTunes before ever having aired on mainstream television. The short-lived Law & Order spin-off Conviction was the first.

The pilot episode of the series was released on DVD as Blade: House of Chthon. The complete series was released on February 12, 2008, on a 4-disc DVD set by New Line Home Entertainment / Warner Bros., featuring the episodes revamped and alternated, with uncensored scenes considered "Too Graphic for TV".

== See also ==
- List of vampire television series
