= Prague Studios =

Prague Studios is a film and television production facility located in the Czech Republic, northeast of Prague.

It was founded in 1999. Of the five soundstages, the largest has a length of 311 feet and a total area of 31,736 square feet.

The stages were originally hangars affiliated with the aircraft factory of Letov in Letňany. Purchased in the fall of 2000 by Prague Studios, the hangars were extensively renovated to suit their new function in film production. In 2002 the studio, secured an additional 15 adjoining square acres to expand further.

Before the Czech Republic joined the European Union in 2004, the studio knew that it would not always be the cheapest location and needed to offer more, to be a good professional place to work. Efforts were put into more co-productions and making the process of film making more smooth.

Prague Studios is managed by Jindřich Güttner in Prague, with U.S. representation by Tomas Krejčí in Los Angeles.

In 2017 Prague Studios built two new state-of-the-art sound stages. The studios were slated to be finished by May 2018.

== Movies & TV Shows shot in Prague Studios ==
- Anne Frank: The Whole Story (2001)
- Blade II (2002)
- XXX (2002)
- Children of Dune (2002)
- Hitler: The Rise of Evil (2003)
- Van Helsing (2004)
- AVP: Alien vs. Predator (2004)
- Hellboy (2004)
- La môme (2007)
- Red Barron (2008)
- Wanted (2008)
- Faubourg 36 (2008)
- Red Tails (2012)
- Viy 3D (2014)
- Bang Bang! (2014)
- Somewhere Only We Know (2015)
- Underworld: Blood Wars (2016)
- The Adventurers (2017)
- Britannia (2018)
- Lore (2018)
- Haunted (2018)
