= David S. Goyer =

American filmmaker, novelist, and comic book writer

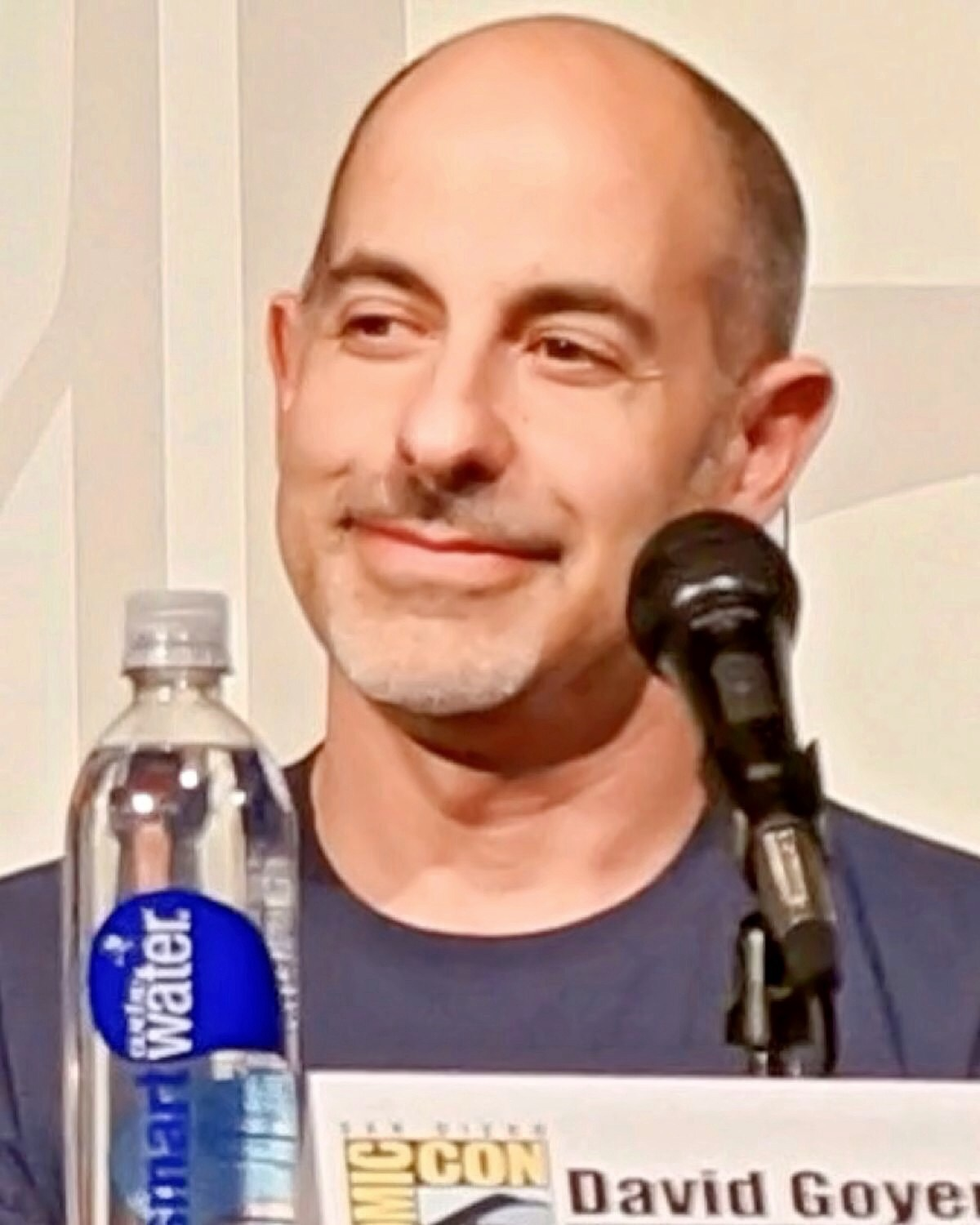
- Goyer at the 2013 San Diego Comic-Con
- Born: David Samuel Goyer; December 22, 1965 (age 60); Ann Arbor, Michigan, U.S.
- Occupations: Film director; screenwriter; film producer; novelist; comic book writer
- Spouse: Marina Black
- Website: Official website

David Samuel Goyer (born December 22, 1965) is an American filmmaker, novelist, and comic book writer. He is best known for writing the screenplays and stories for several superhero films, including Nick Fury: Agent of S.H.I.E.L.D. (1998), the Blade trilogy (1998–2004), Christopher Nolan's Dark Knight trilogy (2005–2012), Man of Steel (2013), and Batman v Superman: Dawn of Justice (2016). He has also directed four films: Zig Zag (2002), Blade: Trinity (2004), The Invisible (2007), and The Unborn (2009). He is the creator of the science fiction television series Foundation, which is loosely based upon the Foundation series written by Isaac Asimov.

Goyer was co-writer of the video games Call of Duty: Black Ops, Call of Duty: Black Ops II, and Call of Duty: Black Ops Cold War. He won a Saturn Award for Best Writing for Batman Begins (2005) and received another nomination for Dark City, and has been nominated for four Hugo Awards.

== Early life ==
Goyer and his brother Jeff were born in Ann Arbor, Michigan, and were raised by their mother. He is Jewish on his mother's side, German on his father’s side, and attended Hebrew school. Goyer is an alumnus of Huron High School and the University of Southern California, graduating from the School of Cinema-Television in 1988.

Goyer was a student of screenwriter Nelson Gidding at USC and frequently returned to Gidding's class as a guest speaker. He graduated in 1988 and sold his first screenplay for Death Warrant in 1989, which starred Jean-Claude Van Damme. With his first paycheck, he bought an Isuzu Trooper, which was stolen the first night he drove it home.

== Career ==
A professed comic book fanatic who often wrote to letter columns, Goyer has written or co-written several screenplays based on comic book characters and series, including Batman, Superman, Ghost Rider, and Blade. and had written a script treatment for a film adaptation of Venom, which was rejected. Goyer wrote a title based around the Justice Society of America for DC Comics titled JSA, which debuted in August 1999. For the first five issues, he collaborated with James Robinson and, until his departure following issue 51, with Geoff Johns, who would take over as solo writer. Alongside Brannon Braga, Goyer co-created FlashForward, a science-fiction TV series that premiered on ABC in 2009. The series was based on the novel by Robert J. Sawyer. He stepped in as show runner in October 2009 after the series struggled out of the gate. On February 5, 2010, Goyer announced he would be stepping down as FlashForward showrunner to focus on feature films and directing.

Goyer's comicbook films explore the consequences of becoming a symbolic figure, a topic he has long been interested in. In 2011, Goyer wrote a short story titled "The Incident" in which Superman renounces his United States citizenship. Goyer worked with Legendary Pictures on three of their projects. He co-wrote the scripts for The Dark Knight Rises (2012) and Man of Steel (2013). In addition, he did a one-step 4-week rewrite for Legendary Pictures' Godzilla reboot. During the same year, Goyer published his first novel, Heaven's Shadow, the first in a trilogy co-written by Michael Cassutt for Ace/Penguin. The novel received generally positive reviews. Goyer subsequently sold the film rights to Warner Bros. and is adapting the first novel for the big screen.

In late October 2011, cable channel Starz and BBC Worldwide greenlit his TV project, Da Vinci's Demons, which followed the life of a 25-year-old Leonardo da Vinci. "This will be a show about secret histories, genius, madness and all things profane," according to Goyer. The show ran for three seasons and received generally favorable reviews, including an 81% rating from Rotten Tomatoes. In March 2013, The Hollywood Reporter announced that Goyer would be directing a film adaptation of the novel The Count of Monte Cristo by Alexandre Dumas.

In June 2013, he was announced to work on both Justice League and a sequel to Man of Steel. In September 2013, Goyer delivered a screenwriting lecture as part of the BAFTA and BFI Screenwriters' Lecture Series. Goyer produced the horror film The Forest, directed by Jason Zada. Focus Features has the North American distribution rights to the film, which was Zada's feature film directorial debut.

By 2014, having already earned a reputation as a veteran of the superhero genre, Goyer shifted his focus to the independent production genre, hiring producer Kevin Turen to run his company. Explaining his thinking, Goyer said: "Everybody talks about how it seems like studios increasingly are relying on these big tentpoles and some micro-budget horror films, and that's the majority of the slate," Goyer said. "I've been a benefactor of that movement, but there are a ton of films out there I've really admired over the last few years that studios aren't making, and I wanted to see if I could help get more of them made." In 2015, soon after embracing independent producing, Goyer won a competitive situation to produce the feature version of Miles. Furthermore, he executive-produced Nate Parker's feature The Birth of a Nation, which sold for a record $17.5 million at the Sundance Film Festival, before sweeping the festival's awards.

In addition to producing, Goyer continues to write. In 2014, he was tapped to write and produce the feature Fantastic Voyage, based on the 1966 original, for James Cameron. Breaking the news, The Hollywood Reporter announced: "The project has been quiet since 2011, but Goyer's involvement kick-starts and will re-engineer what the studio and producers hope to be an event-sized tentpole. It is also now placing the project on the fast track" In January 2016, acclaimed director Guillermo del Toro signed on to direct the feature. Goyer co-wrote Warner Bros.' blockbuster Batman v Superman: Dawn of Justice (2016), with Zack Snyder and Chris Terrio. In July 2016, it was announced that Goyer will write and direct an upcoming interactive virtual reality film about Darth Vader. Goyer stated that he found creating VR content very different from other media, but said "it's surprising how much you feel and how emotional [the VR experience] is [...] there is stuff that makes you tear up and cry, and it's really phenomenal."

In January 2017, Goyer signed on to co-produce and co-write Green Lantern Corps, an installment in the DC Extended Universe, with Justin Rhodes, based on a story treatment by Goyer and Geoff Johns. By April of the same year, it was announced that he had signed on to write the script for the reboot of Masters of the Universe, intended to be released in 2019. Goyer was later announced as director along with Lindsey Beer writing a new draft of the screenplay in January 2018. Filming was set to begin April 2018. By February of that year, Goyer dropped out as the film's director and writer. According to Carlos Huante, a creature designer hired for the film and who worked on the original cartoon, Sony felt that Goyer's script would be too expensive to bring to life as Goyer intended for the movie to be on the epic scale of The Lord of the Rings trilogy.

In September 2017, Deadline reported that Goyer and his Green Lantern Corps partner Justin Rhodes, as well as Chris Eglee and Josh Friedman were hired to take part in a writers room in order to write the next Terminator trilogy, under the direction of collaborating team Tim Miller and James Cameron.

In the early 2020s, Goyer produced The Night House, starring Rebecca Hall, as well as the Scott Cooper film Antlers. The Night House premiered at the 2020 Sundance Film Festival; Searchlight purchased the rights to the film, and released it to critical acclaim in August 2021. Goyer produced the 2021 film The Tomorrow War, starring Chris Pratt for Skydance and Amazon. He has been signed on as a producer for the sequel.

Goyer executive produces and serves as showrunner for Foundation, which premiered on Apple TV+ on September 24, 2021, and is based on Isaac Asimov's novels of the same name. He wrote the first and last episodes as well as directing the season finale. Goyer co-wrote the pilot and serves as executive producer for The Sandman, which was released on Netflix on August 5, 2022. Goyer had been involved with an adaptation of Neil Gaiman's comic book The Sandman since he had pitched a story idea in December 2013. By February 2014, he was set to produce a feature film, starring Joseph Gordon-Levitt, but the film's development stalled and transitioned into a television show.

For the 2022 film Hellraiser, a reimagining of the franchise of the same name, Goyer wrote the story and produced the film under the Phantom Four banner for Spyglass and Hulu. His Phantom Four company had signed a deal with Village Roadshow Pictures.

== Works ==
=== Film ===
Year	Title	Director	Writer	Producer
1990	Death Warrant	No	Yes	No
1991	Kickboxer 2	No	Yes	Associate
1992	Demonic Toys	No	Yes	No
1993	Arcade	No	Yes	No
1994	The Puppet Masters	No	Yes	No
1996	The Crow: City of Angels	No	Yes	No
1998	Dark City	No	Yes	No
1998	Blade	No	Yes	No
2002	Zig Zag	Yes	Yes	No
2002	Blade II	No	Yes	Executive
2004	Blade: Trinity	Yes	Yes	Yes
2005	Batman Begins	No	Yes	No
2007	The Invisible	Yes	No	No
2008	Jumper	No	Yes	No
2008	The Dark Knight	No	Story	No
2009	The Unborn	Yes	Yes	No
2011	Ghost Rider: Spirit of Vengeance	No	Yes	Executive
2012	The Dark Knight Rises	No	Story	No
2013	Man of Steel	No	Yes	No
2016	Batman v Superman: Dawn of Justice	No	Yes	Executive
2019	Terminator: Dark Fate	No	Yes	Executive
2022	Hellraiser	No	Story	Yes

Producer only

Year	Title	Notes
2000	Mission to Mars	Co-producer
2007	Ghost Rider	Executive producer
2016	The Forest	
2016	The Birth of a Nation	Executive producer
2018	Assassination Nation	
2018	A.X.L.	
2018	Tau	
2020	The Night House	
2021	The Tomorrow War	
2021	Antlers	
2024	The First Omen	
2025	Night Patrol	
TBA	Starman	Executive producer, Filming

Uncredited writing roles

- Pet Sematary Two (1992)
- On Deadly Ground (1994)
- Freddy vs. Jason (2003)
- Godzilla (2014)

=== Television ===
Year	Title	Director	Writer	Producer	Creator	Notes
1997	Perversions of Science	No	Yes	No	No	Wrote "Dream of Doom"
1997	Sleepwalkers	No	Yes	Yes	Yes	Wrote "Something Is Buried in Bethlehem" and "Counting Sheep"
2000	FreakyLinks	No	Yes	No	Yes	Wrote "Subject: Fearsum" (Credited as "Ricardo Festiva")
2005	Threshold	Yes	Yes	Executive	No	Directed episode "Trees Made of Glass: Part 1"; Wrote episode "Trees Made of Glass: Part 2"
2006	Blade: The Series	No	Yes	Yes	Yes	Wrote "Pilot" and "Conclave"
2009–2010	FlashForward	Yes	Yes	Executive	Yes	Wrote 5 episodes, directed 2 episodes
2012–2015	Da Vinci's Demons	Yes	Yes	Executive	Yes	Wrote 7 episodes, directed 2 episodes
2014–2015	Constantine	No	Yes	Executive	Yes	Wrote "Non Est Asylum" and "The Devil's Vinyl"
2018–2019	Krypton	No	Yes	Executive	Yes	Wrote "Pilot" and "Light-Years From Home"
2021–2025	Foundation	Yes	Yes	Executive	Yes	Wrote 11 episodes, directed 4 episodes
2022–2025	The Sandman	No	Yes	Executive	Yes	Wrote "Sleep of the Just"
2022	Guillermo Del Toro's; Cabinet of Curiosities	No	Yes	No	No	Episode "The Autopsy"
2025	Murderbot	No	No	Executive	No	

TV movie writer

- The Substitute (1993) (Credited as "Cynthia Verlaine")
- Enemy (1996)
- Nick Fury: Agent of S.H.I.E.L.D. (1998)

=== Video games ===
Year	Title	Publisher(s)	Series	Notes
2010	Call of Duty: Black Ops	Activision	Call of Duty	Story consultant
2012	Call of Duty: Black Ops II	Activision	Call of Duty	
2018	Star Wars: Secrets of the Empire	Disney Interactive Studios	Star Wars	
2019	Vader Immortal: A Star Wars VR Series	Disney Interactive Studios	Star Wars	
2020	Call of Duty: Black Ops Cold War	Activision	Call of Duty	

=== Narrative podcasts ===
Year	Title	Producer	Writer	Notes
2022	Batman Unburied	Yes	Yes	
2023	The Riddler: Secrets in the Dark	Yes	Yes	

=== Novels ===
- Heaven's Shadow (with Michael Cassutt) (2011)
- Heaven's War (with Michael Cassutt) (2012)
- Heaven's Fall (with Michael Cassutt) (2013)
