= Blade (1998 film) =

Film by Stephen Norrington

- Theatrical release poster
- Directed by: Stephen Norrington
- Written by: David S. Goyer
- Based on: Blade by: Marv Wolfman; Gene Colan
- Produced by: Peter Frankfurt; Wesley Snipes; Robert Engelman
- Starring: Wesley Snipes; Stephen Dorff; Kris Kristofferson; N'Bushe Wright; Donal Logue
- Cinematography: Theo van de Sande
- Edited by: Paul Rubell
- Music by: Mark Isham
- Production companies: New Line Cinema; Marvel Enterprises; Amen Ra Films; Imaginary Forces
- Distributed by: New Line Cinema
- Release date: August 21, 1998
- Running time: 120 minutes
- Country: United States
- Language: English
- Budget: $45 million
- Box office: $131.2 million

Blade is a 1998 American superhero film based on the Marvel Comics character. The first in the Blade film series, it was directed by Stephen Norrington and written by David S. Goyer. Wesley Snipes stars as Blade, a human with vampire strengths but not their weaknesses, who battles other vampires. The supporting cast includes Stephen Dorff, Kris Kristofferson and N'Bushe Wright.

Blade was released by New Line Cinema in the United States on August 21, 1998, and was a commercial success, grossing $131 million on a budget of $45 million. It is also hailed as one of Snipes's signature roles.

Blade was noted as a dark superhero film for its time, as well as being Marvel's first successful film. It was followed by two sequels, Blade II (2002) and Blade: Trinity (2004). Snipes reprised his role as Blade in the 2024 film Deadpool & Wolverine.

== Plot ==
In 1967, a pregnant woman is attacked by a vampire, causing her to go into premature labor. Doctors can save her baby, but the woman dies. Thirty years later, the child has become the vampire hunter Blade, who is known as the "Daywalker", a human-vampire hybrid that possesses the supernatural abilities of the vampires without any of their weaknesses, except for the requirement to consume human blood. Blade raids a rave club owned by the vampire Deacon Frost; a badly injured vampire is taken by police to the hospital, where he feeds upon hematologist Karen Jenson and escapes. Blade takes Karen to a safe house where she is treated by his old friend Abraham Whistler. Whistler explains that he and Blade have been waging a secret war against vampires using weapons based on their elemental weaknesses, such as sunlight, silver, and garlic. As Karen is now "marked" by the bite of a vampire, both he and Blade tell her to leave the city. At a meeting of pure-blood vampire elders, Frost, the leader of a faction of younger vampires, is rebuked for trying to incite war between vampires and humans. As Frost and his kind are not natural-born vampires, they are considered socially inferior.

Meanwhile, returning to her apartment, Karen is attacked by police officer Krieger, who is a familiar, a human thrall loyal to vampires. Blade subdues Krieger, but thanks to Karen, Krieger escapes. Blade tracks him down and beats him into revealing Frost's interest in an archive of ancient vampire knowledge. Krieger informs Frost of what happened and is killed for his failure. Frost also has Elder Dragonetti stripped of his fangs and torched alive by the sunrise, then strips the other Elders of their authority and imprisons them. Meanwhile, Blade visits the archivist Pearl, a morbidly obese vampire, and, with a UV light, tortures him into revealing that Frost wants to command a ritual where he would use twelve pure-blood vampires to awaken the "blood god" La Magra, and Blade's blood is the key. Later, at the hideout, Blade injects himself with a special serum that suppresses his urge to drink blood. However, the serum is beginning to lose its effectiveness due to overuse. While experimenting with the anticoagulant EDTA as a possible replacement, Karen discovers that it explodes when combined with vampire blood. She manages to synthesize a vaccine that can cure the infected, but learns that it will not work on Blade. Karen is confident she can eventually cure his bloodlust, but it would take years he doesn't have.

After Blade rejects Frost's offer for a truce, Frost and his men attack the hideout, where they bite Whistler and abduct Karen. When Blade returns, he helps Whistler commit suicide. When Blade attempts to rescue Karen from Frost's penthouse, he is shocked to find his still-alive mother, Vanessa Brooks, who reveals that she came back the night she was attacked and was brought in by Frost, who appears and reveals himself as the vampire who bit her. Blade, whose real name is revealed to be Eric Brooks, is then subdued and taken to the Temple of Eternal Night, where Frost plans to perform the summoning ritual for La Magra. Karen is thrown into a pit to be devoured by her colleague Webb, who has transformed into a decomposing zombie-like creature. Karen injures him and escapes. Blade is drained of his blood, but Karen allows him to drink hers, enabling him to recover. Frost completes the ritual and obtains the powers of La Magra. Blade confronts Frost after killing all of his minions, including his mother, but initially finds him too powerful to defeat. Reasoning that Frost's physical body is still vulnerable, Blade gives him an overdose of EDTA; this triggers an adverse reaction that causes Frost to turn into a grotesque blob before exploding. Karen offers to help Blade cure himself; instead, he asks her to create an improved version of the serum so he can continue his crusade against vampires. In a brief epilogue, Blade confronts an old vampire enemy in Moscow.

== Cast ==
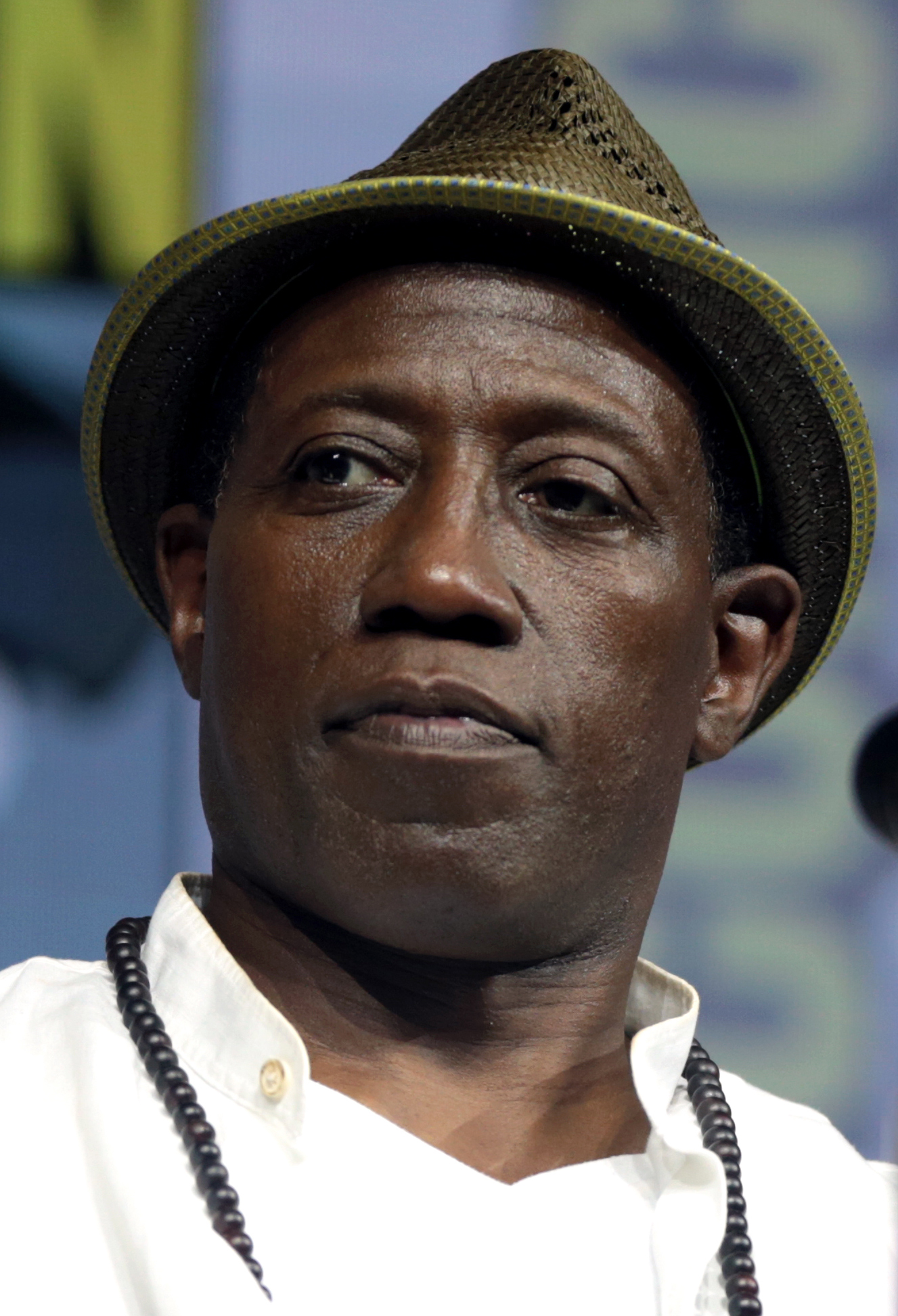
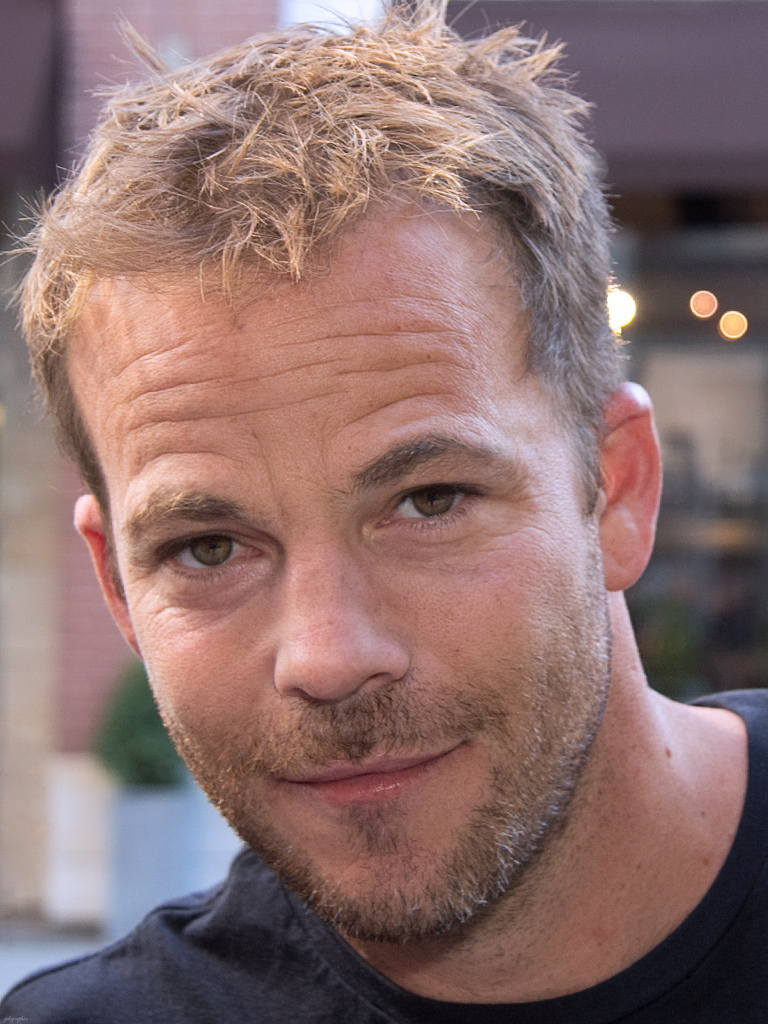
Wesley Snipes in 2018 (left) and Stephen Dorff in 2012 (right)
- Wesley Snipes as Eric Brooks / Blade: A half-vampire "daywalker" (a Dhampir) who hunts vampires. Blade is highly skilled in martial arts and always equips himself with vampire-killing weapons.
- Stephen Dorff as Deacon Frost: An upstart vampire with great ambitions and influence. He emerges as Blade's primary enemy and also wants to conquer the human race.
- Kris Kristofferson as Abraham Whistler: Blade's mentor, father figure and weaponsmith
- N'Bushe Wright as Dr. Karen Jenson: A hematologist who is bitten by a vampire. She stays with Blade to remain safe while she finds a cure for herself and eventually becomes his partner in fighting Deacon Frost's party.
- Donal Logue as Quinn: A longtime enforcer of Frost, capable of surviving wounds that kill lesser vampires.
- Udo Kier as Gitano Dragonetti: A vampire elder.
- Arly Jover as "Mercury": A fleet-footed vampire and one of Frost's multiple lovers.
- Traci Lords as Racquel: A seductive vampire who leads a man to the blood rave.
- Kevin Patrick Walls as Officer Krieger: A "familiar", or human servant, of Frost's.
- Tim Guinee as Dr. Curtis Webb: Karen's ex-boyfriend, who is killed by Quinn and later becomes a zombie-like creature, instead of fully a vampire, as a result of a failed transformation process.
- Sanaa Lathan as Vanessa Brooks: Blade's mother, who has become a vampire.
- Eric Edwards as Pearl: a morbidly obese vampire.
- Shannon Lee as hospital resident
- Brenda Song as Chinatown hostage (uncredited)

== Production ==
=== Background ===
The character Blade was created in 1973 for Marvel Comics by the writer Marv Wolfman and artist Gene Colan as a supporting character in the 1970s comic The Tomb of Dracula. The comic Blade used teakwood knives and was much more the everyman in his behavior and attitude. Though courageous, he displayed flaws as well, such as an inability to get along with certain other supporting cast members and a hatred of vampires that bordered on fanaticism.

The character was not originally a "daywalker" but a human being immune to being turned into a vampire. Lacking the superhuman speed and strength of his undead quarry, he relied solely on his wits and skill until he was bitten by the character Morbius as seen in Peter Parker: Spider-Man #8, first published in August 1999. The film portrayal of Blade was updated for a 1990s audience, and the comics character was subsequently modified to match. Goyer replaced the daggers Blade used in the comics with a sword and gave him a more samurai-like aesthetic. The film's version of Deacon Frost also differs greatly from his comic counterpart. He was older with white hair and a literal church deacon, but the film retains Frost's upstart ambitions.

=== Development ===
When New World Pictures bought the rights to Marvel Comics, they were set to make a Mexico-set western starring Richard Roundtree as the vampire hunter. Marvel Studios then started to develop the film in early 1992, when rapper LL Cool J was interested in playing the lead role. The film was eventually set up at New Line Cinema, with David S. Goyer writing the script. When Goyer heard a film was in development, he went in to pitch with director Ernest Dickerson. David Fincher was also attached to the project and even worked on the script with Goyer. New Line Cinema originally wanted to do Blade as "something that was almost a spoof" before the writer convinced them otherwise. At one point, the studio even asked if Blade could be white. Goyer wanted to take the character seriously, and ground them in a sense of reality with vampirism as a biological disease. He even pitched a trilogy of movies "almost Wagnerian in scope". He also wanted to demystify the vampires and treat them as serious villains with a greater sense of realism instead of the doomed romantic characters shown in Anne Rice's Interview with the Vampire. Goyer's early drafts predated but took a similar post-modern approach as the films From Dusk till Dawn and Vampire in Brooklyn. After failing to get a Black Panther film into production, in 1996, Wesley Snipes signed on to star as Blade. Snipes also produced through his company Amen Ra Films, and worked with the writers to invest the story with elements of classic tragedy - ”like Lear, like Hamlet"- to heighten the characters' emotional drama. Blade had a $45 million budget.

=== Casting ===
When Goyer first pitched the idea of doing a Blade film, Michael De Luca, head of New Line Cinema, suggested Denzel Washington, Wesley Snipes, and Laurence Fishburne, but to Goyer, Snipes was always the perfect choice for Blade. The finalized script was sent to Snipes and no other actor was seriously considered.

Goyer wrote the role of Whistler for Samuel Fuller. Patrick McGoohan was the first choice to play Whistler, as Stephen Norrington was a fan of The Prisoner (1967). Jon Voight was also considered for the role.

=== Filming ===
Principal photography commenced on February 5, 1997, and concluded on June 6, 1997, and was in large part done in Los Angeles, with some scenes being shot in Death Valley. All sets were constructed, and all on-set filming occurred, in what was formerly the Redken Shampoo factory in Canoga Park. The effects for the film were done by Flat Earth Productions.

=== Post-production ===
The first cut of the film was 140 minutes long. It had a disastrous test screening with audiences. Heavy edits and re-shoots were implemented, which delayed the release date for more than half a year. The most significant change was the addition of the final sword fight between Blade and Deacon Frost, which did not exist in the original cut. In the original ending, Frost turned into La Magra and became a large swirling mass of blood instead of keeping his form. This was scrapped because the filmmakers could not get the special effects to look right. It can be seen as a special feature on the DVD. Stan Lee originally had a cameo that was ultimately cut from the film. He played one of the cops who came into the blood club during the aftermath and discovered Quinn's body on fire. The scene where Karen and Deacon are talking about the cure for vampirism initially ran slightly longer, and answered the question of how the vampires would feed if everybody were turned into vampires. They would keep some humans alive in giant blood bags to harvest them. The bags can still be seen in a doorway during the scene, and later played an integral part of the plot in Blade: Trinity. Marvel was not going to give Marv Wolfman and Gene Colan credit for the characters they had created, but Goyer insisted. He asked New Line, and they accepted, but representatives of Marv Wolfman said only he should get credit, and not Gene Colan. Goyer insisted that both be credited.

== Music ==
A soundtrack containing hip hop music was released on August 25, 1998, by TVT Records and Epic Records. It peaked at #36 on the Billboard 200 and #28 on the Top R&B/Hip-Hop Albums. The British techno band The Prodigy was approached to do the soundtrack and score to the film, but had to turn down the offer due to other commitments.

== Release ==
=== Theatrical ===
Blade premiered on August 19, 1998, at New York's Sony Theaters Lincoln Square, with another screening at Los Angeles' Grauman's Chinese Theatre the following day before opening wide on August 21. Three months later, it was released on November 13, 1998 in the United Kingdom, debuting alongside Hope Floats. The film was banned from showing in Malaysia, widely considered to have the most controlling censors in Southeast Asia.

=== Home media ===
Blade was first released on DVD and VHS on December 1, 1998, by New Line Home Entertainment.

The film was released on Blu-ray on June 19, 2012.

The film was released in 4K Ultra HD Blu-ray by Warner Bros. Home Entertainment on December 1, 2020.

=== Lawsuits ===
Marv Wolfman unsuccessfully sued Marvel and New Line Cinema for $35 million after the release of the film, claiming he was not bound by a work for hire contract when he created the character in 1972. He, along with artist Gene Colan, received a "based on characters created by" credit in this film. Three extras in the blood rave scene sued the studios and effects company Reel Creations Inc. claiming the stage blood caused permanent blemishes to their skin.

== Reception ==
=== Box office ===
In North America, Blade dislodged Saving Private Ryan, which had led the previous four weeks at the box office, to finish at number one with $17.1 million across 2,322 screens. The film would top the box office for two weekends until it was overtaken by There's Something About Mary. The film also opened in number one in both Spain, with $1.5 million (US) in 200 theaters, and Australia, with $1 million from 132 cinemas. In the Flemish Region of Belgium, the film earned $323,000 from 20 cinemas, and the Netherlands earned the film $246,000 from 44 cinemas. France made $1.9 million in five days from 241 cinemas, but the film was less successful in Hong Kong (with $182,000 from 22 cinemas) and South Africa ($159,000 from 64 cinemas). The United Kingdom was more successful, taking in $5.7 million over 10 days, as was Brazil, making $855,000 in four days from 133 cinemas. Blade remained atop the North American box office in its second weekend, earning $11.1 million. Blade finished its box office run with $70 million domestically and $61 million worldwide for a total of $131.2 million.

Despite the success of the film, Marvel shared only a flat fee of $25,000.

=== Critical response ===
On Rotten Tomatoes, the film has an approval rating of 59% based on 114 reviews, with an average rating of 6/10. The site's critics' consensus states: "Though some may find the plot a bit lacking, Blade's action is fierce, plentiful, and appropriately stylish for a comic book adaptation." Metacritic, which uses a weighted average, assigned the film a score of 47 out of 100, based on 25 critics, indicating "mixed or average" reviews. Audiences polled by CinemaScore gave the film an average grade of "A−" on an A+ to F scale.

Roger Ebert gave the film three stars out of four, writing: "Blade ... is a movie that relishes high visual style. It uses the extreme camera angles, the bizarre costumes and sets, the exaggerated shadows, and the confident cutting between long shots and extreme closeups. It slams ahead in pure visceral imagery". James Berardinelli gave the film 2½ stars out of 4, writing: "Blade has the capacity to dazzle, but it also will leave many viewers dissatisfied". Berardinelli also wrote: "Blade opens brilliantly, with a series of fast-paced, visually-engaging scenes that display the seedy underbelly of vampire society and introduce the implacable title character in true superhero fashion. For about its first hour, the movie offers violent, visceral, rapid-fire entertainment that concentrates as much on developing a distinctive atmosphere as on advancing a minimalist storyline. Unfortunately [...] it keeps going and going, eventually wearing out its welcome". Dennis Harvey of Variety wrote: "Though slick and diverting in some aspects, increasingly silly pic has trouble meshing disparate elements -- horror, superhero fantasy, straight-up action -- into a workable whole". John Krewson of The A.V. Club was critical of the story and the dialogue, but praised the "creative cinematography and non-stop, decently choreographed gratuitous violence".

Critics such as A. Asbjørn Jøn have noted not only the important place of Blade in the wider vampire genre, but also possible intertextual links between the Whistler character and a character named Whistler in A Dozen Black Roses (1996) by Nancy A. Collins, as they possess "striking similarities in role, dramatic focus, visual appearance, and sharing the name".

=== Accolades ===
The film was nominated for Best Horror Film and Best Make-up at the Saturn Awards. Stephen Dorff won Best Villain at the MTV Movie Awards while Wesley Snipes was nominated for Best Fight.

== Video game ==
A video game prequel was published and released by Activision in 2000 for the PlayStation. The game received mixed reviews. On Metacritic, it received a weighted average score 51% based on reviews from 11 critics, indicating "mixed or average" reviews. A separate game for the Game Boy Color was also released.

== Sequels ==
The success of the film led to two sequels, Blade II in 2002 and Blade Trinity in 2004, as well as a television series.

== Legacy ==
In August 2014, Snipes spoke about his desire to return to the franchise: "I'd be open to it. I think we've got some stones left unturned and there's some latitude left for us to build on and I'd love to get back in the suit again and do some things I've learned how to do now that I didn't know how to do then".

During their 2019 San Diego Comic-Con presentation, Marvel Studios announced a Blade reboot set in the Marvel Cinematic Universe, with Mahershala Ali starring as Blade. Some fans of Snipes were disappointed, but Snipes expressed his support for Ali saying he would "do great".

In 2021, Marvel published The Darkhold: Blade one-shot written by Daniel Kibblesmith, presenting an alternate ending to the film, where Deacon Frost succeeded in his plans to use his power attained as avatar of La Magra to turn billions of humans around the world into vampires.

In 2024, Snipes reprised his role as Blade in the Marvel Cinematic Universe film Deadpool & Wolverine.

== See also ==
- Rise: Blood Hunter
- Vampire Assassin
- Vampire films
