= Vampire hunter =

Fictional character who hunts vampires

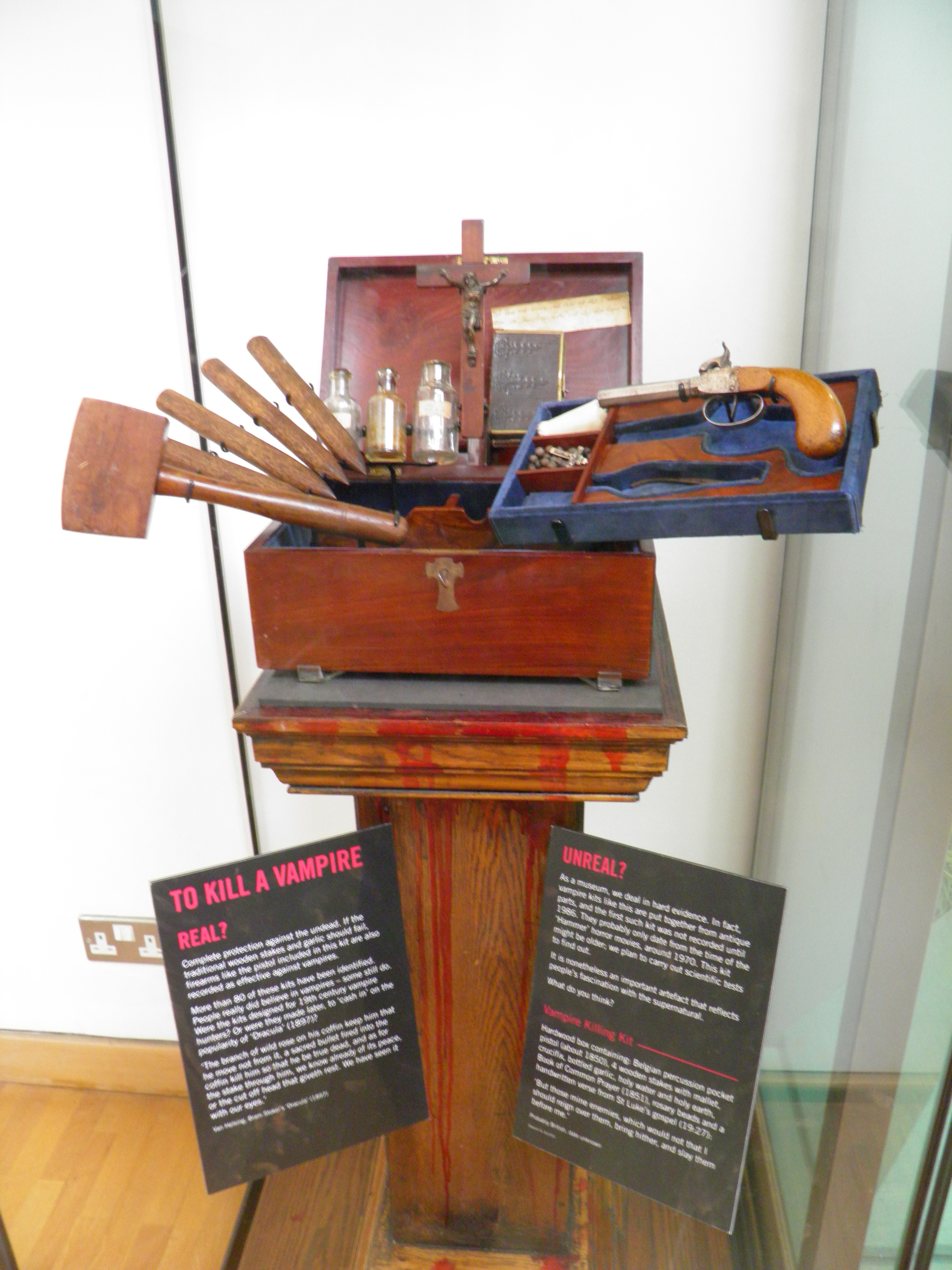
in folklore and fiction, vampire hunters used special equipment to kill vampires. This inspired the creation and sale of vampire killing kits. This kit, which includes wooden stakes, a mallet, a crucifix, and a pistol, is a modern assembly on display at the Royal Armouries.

A vampire hunter or vampire slayer is a fictional occupation in folklore and fiction which specializes in finding vampires, and sometimes other mythical creatures. A vampire hunter is usually described as having extensive knowledge of vampires and other monstrous or undead creatures, including their powers and weaknesses, and uses this knowledge to effectively combat them.

An archetypal vampire hunter is Professor Abraham Van Helsing, a character in Bram Stoker's 1897 horror novel Dracula, a foundational work in the genre.

== In folklore ==
Professional or semi-professional vampire hunters played some part in the vampire beliefs of the Balkans (especially in Bulgarian, Serbian, and Romanian folk beliefs). In Bulgarian, the terms used to designate them included glog (lit. "hawthorn", the species of wood used for the stake), vampirdzhiya, vampirar, dzhadazhiya, svetocher.

They were usually either born on Saturday (then called Sabbatarians, Bulgarian sâbotnichav, Greek sabbatianoí) or the offspring of a vampire and a woman (typically his widow), called a dhampir in Romanian or a vampirović in Serbian. It was also believed that someone born on a Saturday could see a vampire when it was otherwise invisible (and sometimes other supernatural entities as well); similarly for the dhampir. In the case of the Sabbatarians, it was believed in some places that they needed to be fed meat from a sheep killed by a wolf (Bulgarian vâlkoedene); this would enable them not to fear the things that only they were able to see. In Croatian and Slovenian legends, the villages had their own vampire hunters that were called kresniks, whose spirits were able to turn into animals at night to fight off vampires or kudlaks.

Some carried a kit that included a mallet, a stake, and a crucifix. If part of a church, it included holy water, holy oil, etc. However, the most important things that it carried were items such as rope, crowbars, or even pistols.

== In fiction ==
The best known example of a vampire hunter in fiction is Abraham Van Helsing of the novel Dracula and in other works of fiction adapting or modifying that work. Other more recent figures include Buffy "the Vampire Slayer" Summers from the film and television series of the same name. Buffy's spin-off television series Angel is also focused on a vampire hunter; the titular character, Angel, a vampire himself who is cursed with a conscience, is often portrayed battling vampires as well as demons. Created by Marv Wolfman, the Marvel Comics character Blade the Vampire-Slayer is a half human/half vampire who uses his super-strength and agility to hunt vampires and other monsters. The character spawned a 1998 film adaptation which developed into a franchise. Vampire hunters have also appeared in video games, such as Castlevania (the occupation of the famed Belmont lineage), and The Elder Scrolls (with factions such as the Dawnguard).

While predominantly depicted as human, examples of other types of vampire hunters also exist. Dhampiric figures, having a mix of human and vampire blood, are a popular form. Alucard from the Castlevania series, D from the Vampire Hunter D novel series, and the aforementioned eponymous hero of the Blade series of comic books, films, television series, and anime, are examples of dhampir vampire hunters. Some vampire hunters are vampires themselves. Two examples of this type can be found in Morbius the Living Vampire in Marvel Comics, and Zero Kiryuu in the manga and anime series Vampire Knight.

== See also ==
- Demon hunter
