= Curse of the Mutants =

2010 X-Men comics storyline

- Cover of X-Men (vol. 3) #1 (Sep 2010). Art by Adi Granov.
- Publisher: Marvel Comics
- Publication date: July 2010 – May 2011
- Genre: Horror, superhero
- Title(s): X-Men; Namor the First Mutant
- Main character(s): X-Men; Blade; Dracula; Namor; Jubilee; X-Club; Xarus

Creative team
- Writer(s): Victor Gischler; Stuart Moore; Duane Swierczynski; Chuck Kim; Simon Spurrier; Kathryn Immonen

"Curse of the Mutants" is a comics storyline that ran in books published by the American company Marvel Comics from July 2010 to May 2011. The arc centers on a human bomb exploding in San Francisco's Union Square, covering dozens (including Jubilee) in vampire-converting blood. It then becomes the mission of the X-Men to track down Dracula's son Xarus, now "Lord of the Vampires", even if that means enlisting vampire-hunter Blade.

== Publication history ==
The main writer of the storyline is Victor Gischler, who wrote Death of Dracula #1, the one-shot issue which started the storyline, as well as the new ongoing series X-Men (vol. 3), which forms the main part of the storyline.

There is also a four-issue miniseries that links in with "Curse of the Mutants", Namor the First Mutant by Stuart Moore, as well as a two-issue miniseries X-Men vs. Vampires by various creators and a number of one-shot issues: Blade by Duane Swierczynski, Storm and Gambit by Chuck Kim, and Smoke and Blood by Simon Spurrier.

A four-issue miniseries by Kathryn Immonen and Phil Noto that ties into the storyline, called Wolverine and Jubilee: Cursed, started in January 2011.

== Plot summary ==
Xarus meets with the leaders of each vampire clan and has them form an alliance. Xarus and his allies stake Dracula, enabling Xarus to assume leadership over the vampires. Xarus' allies in the Mystikos Sect managed to invent a special device that can block the frequencies of light that are harmful to vampires. Xarus decides to use this device to create a new, dominant place in the world for vampires. Following an attempted betrayal from the Siren Sect, Xarus foolishly allows its leader Alyssa to live and keep serving him. Alyssa secretly slips one of the light-deflecting pendants to Janus, which enables him to escape after the Claw Sect betrays him to Xarus. Xarus declares himself Lord of the Vampires.

Cyclops sends Pixie out to check up on Jubilee. As Pixie and Jubilee visit an outdoor cafe, a man sizzles and explodes in the sunlight. Blood and parts of the man's body cover many in the square, including Jubilee. After testing her blood, it is determined that Jubilee was infected during the explosion by a manufactured virus. That night, the other people infected by the virus during the explosion respond to the call of the vampires.

Blade arrives in San Francisco to assist the X-Men in capturing a vampire specimen for the X-Club. He confirms Dracula's death and reveals that Dracula's son Xarus is the new Lord of the Vampires, having united many vampire clans together. He immediately objects to Cyclops' plan to resurrect Dracula. Much later, while the X-Men gather to discuss the death of Dracula and learn who the new Lord of Vampires is, Kavita Rao is seen checking on Jubilee, only to be attacked. Jubilee leaves Utopia to see Xarus, who bites her. It is also revealed that Xarus only wants Jubilee to lure the X-Men into a trap.

While attempting to free Jubilee, Wolverine is bitten by her. At the same time, the X-Men resurrect Dracula, who declines to help them and says that he will deal with this himself.

The Vampire Nation has gathered its forces for an assault on Utopia. Wolverine lands down and plows through his former comrades. Cyclops then presses the button on a remote that Doctor Nemesis gave him, activating nanobots that disable Wolverine's healing factor and heal his vampirism. Back to his normal self, Wolverine turns on the vampires, who are repelled.

Xarus announces his intention to conquer Utopia, but is attacked and beheaded by Dracula. Whereas Cyclops wants nothing more to do with the Vampire Nation, Blade does not see eye-to-eye with him and charges at Dracula, only to knocked unconscious with an optic blast. Cyclops then reminds Dracula of their previous, unspoken agreement. However, Dracula muses that if his son was successful in uniting the vampire sects into one functional alliance, then perhaps he may finish what he started: conquer Utopia. Dracula, at Cyclops' insistence, decides to end hostilities with mutants.

== Involved issues ==
July

- X-Men: Curse of the Mutants Saga
- Death of Dracula #1 "Curse of the Mutants" prologue
- X-Men #1 "Curse of the Mutants" Chapter 1

August

- X-Men #2 "Curse of the Mutants" Chapter 2
- Namor the First Mutant #1 "Curse of the Mutants" tie-in
- X-Men: Curse of the Mutants - Blade #1 "Curse of the Mutants" tie-in
- X-Men: Curse of the Mutants - Storm and Gambit #1 "Curse of the Mutants" tie-in

September

- X-Men #3 "Curse of the Mutants" Chapter 3
- X-Men: Curse of the Mutants - X-Men vs. Vampires #1 "Curse of the Mutants" tie-in
- X-Men: Curse of the Mutants - Smoke and Blood #1 "Curse of the Mutants" tie-in
- Namor the First Mutant #2 "Curse of the Mutants" tie-in

October

- X-Men: Curse of the Mutants - X-Men vs. Vampires #2 "Curse of the Mutants" tie-in
- Namor the First Mutant #3 "Curse of the Mutants" tie-in
- X-Men #4 "Curse of the Mutants" Chapter 4

November

- X-Men #5 "Curse of the Mutants" Chapter 5
- X-Men: Curse Of The Mutants Spotlight #1
- Namor the First Mutant #4 "Curse of the Mutants" tie-in

December

- X-Men #6 "Curse of the Mutants" Chapter 6
- Deadpool #30 "Curse Of The Mutants"

January

- Deadpool #31 "Curse Of The Mutants"

May

- X-Men #11 "Curse of the Mutants: Blood Hunt"
- Wolverine and Jubilee: Curse of the Mutants #1-4

== Critical reception ==
In a 2024 retrospective on the early 2010s X-Men comics, David Harth of Comic Book Resources (CBR) commented that the initial arc (Curse Of The Mutants) of X-Men's third volume "is usually considered among the worst X-Men stories ever" and the volume "wasn't very popular as its opening story doomed the series".

== Collected editions ==
Title	Material Collected	ISBN	Publication Date
X-Men: Curse of the Mutants	X-Men #1-6, X-Men: Curse of the Mutants Saga + X-Men: Curse of the Mutants Spotlight	ISBN 0-7851-4846-9	February 16, 2011
X-Men, Curse of the Mutants: Mutants vs. Vampires	Storm & Gambit #1, Smoke and Blood #1, Blade #1 + X-Men vs. Vampires #1-2	ISBN 0-7851-5294-6	February 23, 2011
Namor: The First Mutant - Volume 1: Curse of the Mutants	Namor: The First Mutant #1-5	ISBN 0-7851-5174-5	February 23, 2011
Wolverine and Jubilee	Wolverine and Jubilee #1-4	HC: ISBN 0785157751; SC: ISBN 978-0785157755	June 29, 2011

== See also ==
- Publication history of Marvel Comics crossover events
