= Deacon Frost =

Fictional character

Publication information
- Publisher: Marvel Comics
- First appearance: The Tomb of Dracula #13 (October 1973)
- Created by: Marv Wolfman; Gene Colan

In-story information
- Species: Vampire
- Notable aliases: Whitehair

Deacon Frost is a fictional character appearing in American comic books published by Marvel Comics. He appears in The Tomb of Dracula, and is an enemy of Blade. In the comics, Deacon Frost was depicted as a tall, white-haired, late middle-aged gentleman with red eyes, and wearing 1860s Germany period clothing. His doppelgänger sported an accent and attire that suggested a Southern preacher.

The character appeared in the 1998 film Blade as a younger adult instead of an older gentleman, portrayed by Stephen Dorff.

== Publication history ==
Deacon Frost first appeared in The Tomb of Dracula #13 (October 1973), and was created by Marv Wolfman and Gene Colan.

== Fictional character biography ==
Deacon Frost was allegedly a scientist looking for the key to immortality. For one of his experiments, he kidnapped a young woman in order to inject his victim with the blood of a recently killed vampire. The girl's fiancé broke into the lab, and (in the resulting scuffle) Frost was accidentally injected with the blood himself. The result was that Frost became a vampire, with the ability to create vampiric clones of anyone he bites. Frost intended to use this ability to contend for the position of Lord of Vampires, a position that was presently held by Dracula. Frost is the vampire responsible for the death of Blade's mother; Blade's initial mission is to exact revenge against her killer. It was also Frost who turned Hannibal King into a vampire. Blade and King (while initially distrusting each other) eventually teamed up to fight Frost's army of doppelgangers of Blade and King. The two of them managed to defeat and apparently destroy Frost in his underground hideout, stabbing him twice and leaving his body to be consumed as his hideout exploded.

Many years later, Blade encountered a vampire that called itself Deacon Frost. This vampire had a different appearance and personality to the original, and was later identified as being a doppelgänger. The doppelgänger attempted to summon a powerful demon, only to be devoured by said creature. In a later one-shot story set in New Orleans, Frost was encountered yet again, but he appeared as he did in The Tomb of Dracula. He also confirmed that the previous encounter was indeed an imposter (as Blade suspected) who was created using science and magic. Blade and King, with the help of Brother Voodoo, foiled Frost's attempt to gain control of Garwood Industries through Donna Garth (daughter of Simon Garth the Living Zombie). Frost escaped this encounter vowing revenge. Frost appeared at the summons of Dracula to defend the Lord of Vampires as he underwent a magical ritual, only to be staked by Blade.

== Powers and abilities ==
Deacon Frost, like the rest of the vampires, has superhuman strength and the standard powers of a vampire, including the ability to change his appearance and resistance to conventional wounds. Frost is also capable of creating vampiric duplicates of his victims with his bite, which are under his absolute mind control. Frost can even create replicas of these duplicates by biting them. Ultimately, these beings are able to absorb the original victim into their own body. Frost also possesses extensive knowledge of medicine, physics, and chemistry.

Like the rest of the vampires, Deacon Frost needs to drink blood assiduously to survive, cannot expose himself to sunlight without burning, and is damaged if exposed to crucifixes or any other religious symbol wielded by someone with deep faith. In addition his heart must be pierced with a wooden stake to end his unlife. He does not appear on reflective surfaces like mirrors.

== Reception ==
- In 2021, Screen Rant included Deacon Frost in their "Marvel: 10 Most Powerful Vampires" list.
- In 2022, CBR.com ranked Deacon Frost 8th in their "10 Most Important Marvel Vampires" list.

== Other versions ==
=== Earth-9991 ===
While roughhousing, two boys enter the parking garage where Frost is located with his latest creation, a monster called the White Worm. Frost sics the White Worm on the children, then flees when he senses the approach of Blade.

=== Ultimate Marvel ===
The Ultimate version of Deacon Frost appears with a youthful appearance. He has been captured by S.H.I.E.L.D. in order to convince Blade to join Nick Fury's Black ops team.

=== Darkhold ===
In the one-shot The Darkhold: Blade by Daniel Kibblesmith, presenting an alternate ending to the 1998 Blade film, Deacon Frost is successful in his plans at using his power attained as La Magra's avatar to turn billions of humans around the world into vampires.

== In other media ==
=== Television ===
Deacon Frost appears in Marvel Anime: Blade, voiced by Tsutomu Isobe in the Japanese version and JB Blanc in the English dub. This version is the founder and leader of Existence, an organization with vast influence in Asia that consists of vampires, most of which he genetically altered to make them more powerful, and humans who were deceived into helping them in exchange for fulfilling their desires. In flashbacks, Frost witnessed his son Edgar being killed by a vampire. Incensed by corrupt police officers who refused to investigate further, he hired vampire hunters to help him research vampires and empower himself. In time, he formulated a plan to exterminate pureblood vampires and breed a new generation from Blade's blood so he can rule the world. Nevertheless, he is defeated by Blade.

=== Film ===
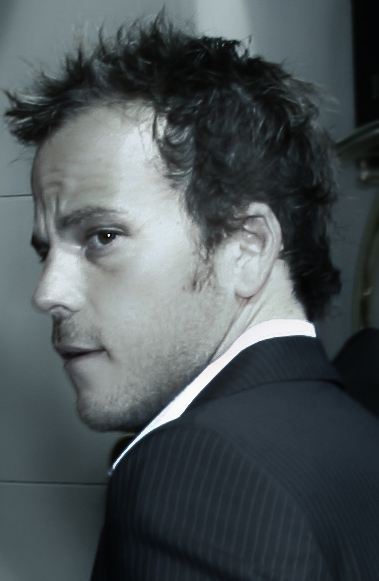
The actor Stephen Dorff, who played Deacon Frost in the movie Blade

- Deacon Frost appears in Blade (1998), portrayed by Stephen Dorff. This version is the ambitious leader of a faction of young vampires who resembles a young man and owns several nightclubs that primarily caters to vampires. Against the House of Erebus's wishes, he seeks to become the blood god, La Magra and subjugate humanity. Despite succeeding, he is defeated and killed by Blade via EDTA darts.
- In October 2008, Blade director Stephen Norrington stated he was developing a prequel film featuring Stephen Dorff reprising his role as Deacon Frost. In 2012, the film rights for Blade reverted to Marvel Studios.

=== Video games ===
Deacon Frost appears in Marvel Pinball via the Blade table.
