= Blade (character) =

Marvel Comics fictional character

- Character art for a variant cover of Blade #1 (July 2023). Art by Stefano Caselli.

Publication information
- Publisher: Marvel Comics
- First appearance: The Tomb of Dracula #10 (July 1973)
- Created by: Marv Wolfman (writer); Gene Colan (artist)

In-story information
- Alter ego: Eric Cross Brooks
- Species: Dhampir (retconned from his original origin as a vampire-immune human)
- Team affiliations: Avengers; MI: 13; Nightstalkers; Vanguard; Midnight Sons; Mighty Avengers; Structure
- Notable aliases: The Daywalker; SwitchBlade; Spider Hero; Ronin
- Abilities: Master martial artist; Expert swordsman and marksman; Highly knowledgeable about vampire lore; Superhuman strength, speed, agility, and stamina; Enhanced senses; Accelerated healing; Immunity to both vampire bites and vampire hypnosis; Slowed aging; Ability to sense supernatural creatures

Blade is an antihero appearing in American comic books published by Marvel Comics. Created by writer Marv Wolfman and penciller Gene Colan, his first appearance was in The Tomb of Dracula #10 (cover dated July 1973) as a supporting character, before going on to star in his own solo storylines. Shortly after his introduction, Blade became one of Marvel's most prominent supernatural heroes, appearing alongside teams including the Nightstalkers, the Midnight Sons, and the Avengers. Blade stories, both solo and as part of ensemble casts, have been published across multiple ongoing series since the character's creation.

Blade is the antihero persona of Eric Cross Brooks, a Black British man born in the Soho neighborhood of London. When his mother was attacked by the vampire Deacon Frost during childbirth, certain vampire enzymes passed to the newborn Eric, making him a dhampir. While originally depicted as a human immune to vampire bites, Blade was retroactively established to be a dhampir following his adaptation as such in Spider-Man: The Animated Series and the Blade film series. Devoting his life to ridding the world of all vampires, Blade possesses superhuman strength, speed, agility, and stamina, an accelerated healing factor, and immunity to both vampire bites and hypnosis, while remaining unaffected by sunlight, earning him the title "The Daywalker". He is proficient in weaponry ranging from firearms to swords and is a master of martial arts. He is the father of Brielle Brooks (Bloodline).

Major Blade storylines include his ongoing feud with Dracula across The Tomb of Dracula, his formation of the supernatural detective agency Borderline Investigations alongside Hannibal King and Frank Drake, and his roles in the company-wide stories "Civil War" (2006–2007), "Heroes Reborn" (2021), and "Blood Hunt" (2024). Blade's chief enemies include Dracula, Deacon Frost, and the ancient vampire lord Varnae.

The character has been substantially adapted from the comics into various forms of media, including films, television series, video games, and his own animated series. Blade was portrayed by Wesley Snipes in the films Blade (1998), Blade II (2002), and Blade: Trinity (2004), as well as Deadpool & Wolverine (2024), part of the Marvel Cinematic Universe (MCU); Sticky Fingaz replaced Snipes for the television series Blade: The Series (2006). Snipes's portrayal helped establish Blade as one of Marvel's most recognizable supernatural heroes and is widely credited with revitalizing the superhero film genre. Mahershala Ali voiced the character in the MCU film Eternals (2021) ahead of a standalone film, before dropping out of the role in 2026, following several years of development issues.

== Publication history ==
=== 1970s ===
Blade was introduced as a supporting character in the Marvel Comics series The Tomb of Dracula #10 (July 1973), written by Marv Wolfman and penciled by Gene Colan. The artist recalled in 2003, "Marv told me Blade was a black man, and we talked about how he should dress, and how he should look – very heroic looking. That was my input. [...] The bandolier of blades – that was Marv's idea. But, I dressed him up. I put the leather jacket on him and so on". Colan based the character's features on "a composite of black actors" including NFL football star-turned-actor Jim Brown. He initially sported 1970s-style Afro hair. He wielded teak-bladed knives. Blade appeared in issues #10–21 and made frequent appearances until #61 in 1977.

Wolfman spoke on the character's inception during an interview:

When I was at DC I was working with a partner and we were working on the Teen Titans, a different version of it than I later did and came up with a Black superhero and we wrote it, and it was drawn and everything and for one reason or another the story was never published, there were all sorts of explanation but I was never there, all I know is the story was never published, and one of the promises I made to myself was that the next character is created, would be a Black character like the character for Teen Titans, because I didn't think Black characters were represented at all in comics to any great degree. I felt coming from New York City, going to a school, and everybody who attends that high school is pretty much everybody who lives within a few blocks of you, because that's the way it works, I went to school in Manhattan, called High school of Art and Design, and it took people of all of New York, you saw people of all kinds there, so it didn't sound strange to me, to use a Black character, and I just never understood why they didn't, so [when] I came up with Blade it came to me literally in a second. I'm not joking, I had just gotten the Dracula assignment, and I wasn't thinking about anything, suddenly, the character came full blown, I knew exactly who he was and what he looked like, and I knew everything about him.

Wolfman recalled in 2009,

I knew if I let him, Blade would eclipse the other characters, so I pulled him back and let original supporting characters Rachel, Frank and Quincy shine. I also wasn't happy with my Blade dialogue, so I pulled him out of the book for a while — I think almost a year — and when I brought him back I played him a bit straighter. The early Blade dialogue was cliché 'Marvel Black' dialogue. Later on, I tried to make him more real. But it took growing up as a writer.

Outside The Tomb of Dracula, he fought the scientifically-created vampire Morbius the Living Vampire in the latter's series in Adventure into Fear #24 (Oct. 1974), in a story written by Steve Gerber and penciled by P. Craig Russell. Blade's first solo story came in Marvel's black-and-white horror-comics magazine Vampire Tales #8 (Dec. 1974), in an 11-page story by Wolfman and penciller-inker Tony DeZuniga. This feature continued in issue #9 (Feb. 1975), with Wolfman and Chris Claremont co-scripting. This story was concluded in a 56-page solo story in the black-and-white showcase magazine Marvel Preview #3 (Sept. 1975), written by Claremont, with two chapters each drawn by DeZuniga and by Rico Rival (this story was announced for Vampire Tales #12, but was published here after that magazine was cancelled). A six-page backup story by Wolfman and Colan followed in Marvel Preview #8 (Fall 1976).

=== 1990s ===
Blade next came into prominence in the 1990s, beginning with Ghost Rider #28 (Aug. 1992), in the Midnight Sons imprint that included issues of Darkhold: Pages from the Book of Sins, Ghost Rider, Ghost Rider/Blaze: Spirits of Vengeance, Midnight Sons Unlimited, Morbius, and Nightstalkers. Blade co-starred in the 18-issue series Nightstalkers, and appeared with that team in a story in the anthology issue Midnight Sons Unlimited #1 (April 1993). He appeared in two solo stories, in Midnight Sons Unlimited #2 and 7 (July 1993 and Oct. 1994).

Following the cancellation of Nightstalkers, Blade debuted in his first color-comics series, Blade the Vampire Hunter #1–10 (July 1994 – April 1995), written by Ian Edginton (with the last two issues by Terry Kavanagh) and penciled by Doug Wheatley. Blade next appeared in a 12-page inventory story in issue #1 (Feb. 1997) of the short-lived black-and-white anthology series Marvel: Shadows and Light. He then starred again in two solo one-shots: Blade: Crescent City Blues #1 (March 1998), by writer Christopher Golden and penciller and co-creator Colan; and Blade: Sins of the Father #1 (Oct. 1998), by writer Marc Andreyko and penciller Bart Sears. Marvel next announced a six-issue miniseries, Blade (storyline: "Blade: Blood Allies") by the writer Don McGregor and penciller Brian Hagen, but only issues #1–3 (Nov. 1998–Jan. 1999) were published. Marvel published a different six-issue miniseries later that year, Blade: Vampire Hunter (storyline: "Chaos (A)"; Dec. 1999 – May 2000), written and, except for the last two issues, pencilled by Bart Sears.

=== 2000s and 2010s ===
The next ongoing series, Blade vol. 2 by writer Christopher Hinz and artist Steve Pugh, ran six issues, published by Marvel MAX in 2002. Blade vol. 3 by the writer Marc Guggenheim and penciller-inker Howard Chaykin, ran 12 issues (Sept. 2006–Aug. 2007). The final two pages of the last issue were drawn by co-creator Colan. Blade also starred in two promotional comic books: Blade #1/2 (1999) by writer-artist Sears and inker Bill Sienkiewicz, bundled with issues of Wizard: The Comic Magazine #2000; and Blade: Nightstalking (2005), a 22-page story by writers Jimmy Palmiotti and Justin Gray and penciller Amanda Conner, based on New Line Cinema's Blade films, and bundled with the Blade: Trinity Deluxe Edition DVD. Additionally, the second Blade movie was adapted as the Marvel comic Blade 2: Bloodhunt — The Official Comic Adaptation (April 2002) by writers Steve Gerber and David S. Goyer and penciller-inker Alberto Ponticelli.

Blade joined the cast of Captain Britain and MI: 13 beginning with issue #5 (Nov. 2008). In 2015, it was announced that Tim Seeley and Logan Faerber would be launching a new Blade series, starting in October 2015, as part of Marvel's post-Secret Wars relaunch, focusing on his daughter Fallon Grey. However, this title has since been abandoned, in favor of Bloodline: Daughter of Blade, following his and Safron Caulder's daughter Brielle "Bri".

== Fictional character biography ==
=== Early life and career ===
Marvel Preview #3 (Sept. 1975), painted cover art by Gray Morrow.

Eric Cross Brooks was born in a brothel in the Soho neighborhood of London, England, on October 24, 1929. His mother was Tara Vanessa Cross-Brooks, an heiress given shelter by Madame Vanity, an agent of the Order of Tyrana. When Tara experienced severe labor complications, Vanity sent for a doctor. The man who arrived turned out to be the vampire Deacon Frost, who seized the opportunity to feast on Tara, killing her. However, this inadvertently passed along certain vampire enzymes to her baby son as he was born; he became half-vampire and could not be turned by a vampire's bite. Blade has also speculated that it gave him a hatred of vampires, though this may simply be hyperbole on his part. The brothel's sex workers drove off Frost once they realized what he had done.

Due to his father, Lucas Cross, being falsely imprisoned in his native Latveria, Eric was raised in the brothel, believing his mother to have worked there, and at age nine, returning home from school one day, he saw an old man being attacked by three vampires. Eric helped the man, Jamal Afari, distract his attackers so that he could kill them with a silver sword. Afari, posing as a jazz musician, soon became a father figure to Eric, teaching him music and training him in the ways of fighting vampires. Eric was soon able to defeat many of the weak, younger vampires that he and Afari found in abundance. Over time, the young man became an Olympic-level athlete and a formidable hand-to-hand combatant; his skill with knives and daggers was such that it earned him the nickname "Blade" among both his fellow hunters and the vampires they opposed, who began to fear him. After the deaths of Hannibal King and Frank Drake, he once used the alias "Frank Blade" with his landlady, which he claimed was short for "Hannibal Francis Blade". In Earth-1610, Blade also received additional training from the legendary Stick.

Blade's easy victories made him cocky. He joined a gang of young hunters, the Bloodshadows, headed by Cyrus Cutter, later killed by Blade in a knife fight caused by Blade's disapproval of Cutter's actions as leader. Glory Anah, Cutter's girlfriend, became Blade's first lover. Having gone to London, where for months the group hunted vampires, demons, and warlocks under Blade's leadership, the group encountered a much older and more powerful vampire than any Blade had met before, named Lamia. Blade staked Lamia, but the other Bloodshadows were slain, and Glory was bitten, making her a vampire. Although Glory subsequently refused to kill Blade, she warned him never to look for her or she would kill him. The tragedy of the experience changed Blade considerably, as he became much more focused and determined in his hunting. Afari himself later fell prey to Dracula, the first occurrence in an ongoing feud between the vampire lord and Blade. Blade mercy-killed his mentor after Afari rose as a vampire, and tracked Dracula back to Europe, Asia, and Asia Minor, staking him many times, but never destroying him. While in China, Blade joined Ogun Strong's vampire hunters, which included Azu, Orji, and Musenda. Together, they staked Dracula again. Dracula survived and killed all of the hunters except Blade and Musenda, who eventually retired from vampire hunting. Orji had created a lasting impression on Blade by using wooden daggers to combat vampires, and he quickly adopted them as his preferred arms. Grieving his fallen comrades, Blade resumed his hunt alone.

=== Quincy Harker's vampire hunters ===
Blade eventually located Dracula in Paris, where he first encountered the vampire hunter Quincy Harker, son of Jonathan Harker, who he knew by reputation, and Harker's fellow vampire hunters: Rachel van Helsing, great-granddaughter of Abraham Van Helsing; Taj Nital; and Frank Drake, last mortal descendant of Dracula. Because of his mercurial temperament, Blade had a strained but steady relationship with the group, allying himself with them on several occasions but always parting ways with them in the end. Later, after an unsuccessful battle with Dracula, Blade discovered his immunity to the vampire's curse that had felled many other hunters. Armed with this knowledge, he parted company with Harker and went after Deacon Frost alone. Blade later battled Dracula in London, as well as Morbius the Living Vampire, and the Legion of the Damned, who unsuccessfully framed him for murder. He next encountered a band of young children who had turned into vampires after being abducted and fed on. Without hesitation, Blade killed them.

Blade's hunt for his mother's killer led him to Boston, Massachusetts, where he allied with Dracula against Doctor Sun. Following this battle, Dracula vanished, and Blade again set out on his own. He eventually encountered Hannibal King, a private detective whom Deacon Frost had turned into a vampire. While initially distrusting King, Blade teamed up with him to hunt Frost. Blade and King fought together against Blade's evil doppelgänger who absorbed the real Blade into his form. King enlisted the help of Daimon Hellstrom, the Son of Satan, who exorcised Blade from the doppelgänger and killed it with King's help. Blade and King eventually caught up with Frost, who had created an army of vampiric doppelgängers, one for each of his victims. With King's help, Blade finally avenged his mother by striking Frost down; the two forged a lasting friendship. Blade, Rachel van Helsing, and Harold H. Harold teamed up to confront Dracula, but he again survived the encounter. Blade traveled to China upon learning that his old friend Musenda had died and honored the former hunter's memory by saving his wife from being turned into a vampire.

=== The Nightstalkers ===
In later years, Blade, along with King and Drake, became a frequent ally of the sorcerer Doctor Strange, and the three assisted Strange in battles with Dracula and the Darkholders and assisted in the casting of the Montesi Formula, which, for a time, destroyed all vampires on Earth. Blade, King, and Drake then formed the private detective agency Borderline Investigations, Inc. to combat supernatural threats. Alongside Strange, the three detectives battled the Darkholders again. Blade also rescued his close friend Safron Caulder from the Darkholders.

The agency discontinued after Drake left and Blade was committed to a psychiatric hospital following a battle with a temporarily resurrected Dracula. Doctor Strange later arranged the release of Blade so that he could join Drake and King in reforming Borderline Investigations, Inc. as the Nightstalkers. Blade, King, and Drake were hired by Lilith the Mother of All Demons to kill the second Ghost Rider and the non-infernally powered John Blaze. The three Nightstalkers battled Meatmarket. The Nightstalkers then teamed with the Ghost Rider, Blaze, Morbius, Doctor Strange, and the Darkhold Redeemers to battle Lilith and her Lilin. The Nightstalkers also battled other threats, such as HYDRA's DOA. Upon the eventual weakening of the Montesi Formula and the return of vampires, Blade encountered and staked a former ally, the now-vampiric Taj Nital, and survived a battle with the first Lord of Vampires, Varnae, in which Drake and King appeared to have been killed.

=== The Daywalker ===
A solo vampire-hunter once again, Blade briefly joined forces with the mystic Bible John Carik, and encountered a vampire impersonating Deacon Frost and a once-again resurrected Dracula. Later, in New Orleans, Louisiana, Blade discovered that Hannibal King had survived, and the two joined forces to defeat a genuinely resurrected Frost. Blade remained active in New Orleans, defeating the vampire Ulysses Sojourner and his own former ally, Morbius, who was under Sojourner's mental thrall. Blade followed Morbius to New York, where, while teamed with Spider-Man, Blade was bitten by Morbius. Blade's blood enzymes reacted unexpectedly with Morbius's unique form of vampirism to grant Blade many vampire strengths, while eliminating weaknesses inherent to a true vampire, most notably the vulnerability to sunlight. It was at this time that Blade assumed the unofficial title of "the Daywalker" among his prey.

The United Nations-sanctioned espionage agency S.H.I.E.L.D. sought to use Blade's blood for Project: Silvereye, an attempt at cloning vampire operatives. Blade and the vampire-hunting twins Mosha and Mikado shut down the project. Blade later joined Noah van Helsing, actually Noah Tremayne, Rachel van Helsing's adopted cousin, and several vampire hunters worldwide to stop Dracula from becoming a genuinely god-like vampire lord. Blade then returned to New Orleans. Blade re-encountered Dracula and appeared to fully destroy the vampire lord once again aboard the S.H.I.E.L.D. Helicarrier Pericles V. Unbeknownst to Blade, his wealthy father, Lucas Cross, had been responsible for Dracula's most recent resurrection. Cross later kidnapped Blade and attempted to force Blade to feed on a virgin girl in an attempt to fulfill a prophecy. Blade escaped after biting through his own hand. Later, Blade would feed on a virgin after biting an evil vampire priest, Draconis. In exchange for undertaking a time travel adventure for the supervillain Doctor Doom, Blade received from Doom an elixir that would purportedly cure a vampire of thirst for human blood, but would also remove the bloodlust vampire hunters get for killing the undead. At the end of the series, Blade gave Hannibal King the elixir. During this time travel mission, Blade fulfilled another part of the prophecy by freeing his imprisoned father.

=== Civil War and beyond ===
During the Civil War storyline, in which the superheroes of the Marvel Universe were split over the Superhuman Registration Act, Blade registers and begins cooperating with S.H.I.E.L.D. This alliance allowed Blade access to S.H.I.E.L.D. tech, gaining himself a "gun hand" to replace his missing one. Blade completes a prophecy he believes would give all extant vampires back their souls, but which instead returns to existence every vampire that had ever been killed. Blade next leads a group of superhuman black-ops agents funded secretly by the U.S. government, called the Vanguard, of which even the President is unaware. During his time with this squad, Blade receives a cybernetic replacement hand. The squad disbands after their cover is compromised, and Blade returns home to the United Kingdom to join MI-13 in its fight against supernatural evil. He soon afterwards stakes his new teammate, the vampire hero Spitfire. Blade and Spitfire clashed again with each other in a fierce battle, but the two were forced to work together and seemed to have formed an unlikely friendship. Upon completing their first mission together, Blade attempts to apologize to Spitfire for trying to kill her, but before he could finish, she kisses him.

During the "Curse of the Mutants" storyline, Blade appears in San Francisco to assist the X-Men in capturing a vampire specimen for the X-Club. He confirms Dracula's death and reveals that his son Xarus is the new Lord of Vampires, having united all of the vampire sects under a single flag. He immediately objects to Cyclops' plan to resurrect Dracula, stating "You don't dig up Hitler to get rid of Saddam Hussein". The conflict concluded with Dracula being resurrected anyway, despite Blade's objections. Blade attempts to kill the now-vampire Jubilee, but is forced to withdraw after a stand-off with Wolverine, who refuses to allow her to be staked, even as Blade warns the X-Men that they will eventually have to kill her.

Blade was later revealed to have been the character (whose identity is kept from the reader) on the Mighty Avengers team who dons the Halloween-type Spider Hero alias during the Infinity storyline, and the Ronin identity from a "big box of Clint Barton's old stuff" during the Inhumanity storyline; his true identity was eventually revealed. To prepare for his next TV program, Mojo paired Blade up with Doctor Strange, Ghost Rider, Manphibian, Man-Thing, and Satana the Devil's Daughter, where he formed the Avengers of the Supernatural. He mind-controlled them and had them fight the Avengers Unity Division. Both groups managed to break free from the mind-control and returned to their world after preventing the Ghost Rider from using his Penance Stare on the inhabitants of Mojoworld.

Blade later appears in a small town hunting down a necromancer and ends up confronting Gwenpool, who was unknowingly hired to kill him. After Gwenpool explains that the dead residents are living peacefully, Blade leaves after he gives her his cellphone number, dubbing her "Pink Slayer", but is called back when Gwenpool discovers that the mayor/necromancer is actually draining the life-force from children to keep his undead citizens alive. During the "Secret Empire" storyline, Blade was shown to have been trapped in Manhattan when it was isolated by a Darkforce dome. Without sunlight to harm them, the local vampire community emerged to feed on the trapped humans, and Blade kept himself busy tracking down and staking all of them. During the "War of the Realms" storyline, Blade appears with the Avengers and the other heroes fighting Malekith the Accursed and his army. He also joins the group sent to destroy the Black Bifrost. He also appears attacking Roxxon's secret base in Antarctica, fighting the Berserkers with Gorilla-Man and Ka-Zar. Later in the series, Blade becomes the sheriff of "Vampire Nation", a haven for vampires overseen by Dracula.

During the "Blood Hunt" storyline, Blade visits Miles Morales in Brooklyn, stating that he has a plan to deal with the vampire invasion. While stating to the Avengers that he has a plan while driving in his truck, he wants them to bring his truck to the Impossible City. The members of the Blood coven emerge from the truck and compromise the Impossible City. Blade later visits Doctor Strange and Clea at the Sanctum Sanctorum, stating that the Structure is behind this and the Avengers have been defeated by the Bloodcoven, who he describes as ultra-vampires who drink superhuman blood. When Strange asks if Dracula is leading the Structure, Blade states that he is the leader of the Structure and prepares to attack Strange. It is later revealed that Blade is possessed by Varnae.

== Powers and abilities ==
=== Comics ===
Due to an enzyme in his bloodstream resulting from his mother's being bitten by a vampire while giving birth to him, Blade is immune to the bites of typical, supernatural vampires. In certain instances, he also appeared immune to vampire hypnosis as well. He lacked superhuman physical attributes, however, and relied solely on his considerable skill and determination until Morbius, an atypical, scientifically created vampire, bit him and Blade was turned into something resembling a dhampir. Blade possesses superhuman strength, stamina, speed, agility, heightened senses, and a rapid healing factor that attacks any alien substances (chemicals/viruses) in his body. The healing factor also eliminates any chance of him being rendered helpless or maimed from the inside. Blade is unaffected by daylight and most other traditional vampire weaknesses. He also ages very slowly (although he is not immortal) and can preternaturally sense supernatural activity.

When he was raised and trained by Jamal Afari, Blade learned everything about vampire lore, from their strengths to their weaknesses, and how he could use his powers and skills to hunt down vampires so he could fight and kill them. Blade is a master martial artist, mastering styles like Boxing, Capoeira, Escrima, Jeet Kune Do, Hapkido, Jujutsu, Shotokan Karate, Kung-Fu, and Ninjutsu. He is also a skilled swordsman, marksman, and a formidable street-fighter. He is adept in the usage of throwing knives. He is highly knowledgeable about vampire lore as well as the supernatural. In "Dracula's Gauntlet", Blade and Deadpool are surrounded by monsters, and Blade threatens to turn into a bat and leave Deadpool there to die. He may have all vampire powers, but feels conflicted about using the ones that make him seem less human.

=== Films and television series ===
In the films and television series, Blade originated from Detroit, Michigan. Blade is depicted as having all of a vampire's strengths and none of the weaknesses, except for the bloodlust. Blade attempts to suppress the thirst with a serum, but during the first film, his body develops a resistance to it. At the beginning of the second film, it is stated that Dr. Karen Jenson, from the first film, improved the serum, presumably in the time between the two films. Although he does not want to drink blood, he is capable of it; before the development of the serum, Abraham Whistler noted that he found Blade as a teenager when Blade was feeding on the homeless, with Blade ingesting blood during the first and second films when in a position where he was badly injured and needed to be back at full strength as soon as possible.

Blade's half-vampire physiology results in him being completely immune to silver, garlic, and sunlight. Blade has superhuman strength, speed, stamina, agility, reflexes, and senses. He also has a healing factor that allows him to heal completely from wounds overnight, although in the first and second films he was forced to drink blood to accelerate his usual healing abilities when faced with an immediate threat and too badly injured to confront it on his own. It is also mentioned in the first film that he ages like a human, while vampires age much more slowly. He is a master of martial arts, practices meditation, and can speak Czech, Russian, and, to a degree, the vampire language, and he has a great deal of knowledge about hunting vampires. It is seen in the television series that, while he is only half-vampire, Blade's saliva still produces the enzyme that turns humans into vampires.

== Equipment ==
=== Comics ===
According to his earliest appearances in the original The Tomb of Dracula comics, Blade relied on teakwood daggers which he used to impale opponents, and a variety of mahogany stakes. He was an excellent hand-to-hand combatant and knife-fighter. Later comics upgraded his arsenal significantly over the years, including a variety of different bladed weapons ranging from long swords to katanas, as well as guns, flamethrowers, and UV and silver-based weapons. He relies mainly on a double-edged sword he carries on his back. He has also had some success with improvised weapons, such as stakes made from snapped brooms and, after losing his hand, a replacement appendage made from duct tape and a pointed stick. He would replace this with a new machine gun-esque firearm used in place of his missing hand, which responds to different muscle twitches as an indication of reloading and firing, among other functions (including a grappling hook, which Blade describes as his "favorite feature"). It also uses three different kinds of ammo. This weapon was created by S.H.I.E.L.D. Blade also had an arsenal of EMP grenades.

=== Films and television series ===
Much in the same way as in the comics, in the movie series, Blade employs a stylized double-edged sword as one of his main offense and defense tools. Although not much detail is specified in the comics about the composition of the sword, in the films, it is equipped with an acid-etched titanium blade that has a security feature that will release blades into the wielder's hand after a set time. This is aborted by Blade or others who know of the system by pushing a hidden switch in the sword's hilt. The movies also depict him wielding varieties of throwable "glaives" (boomerang- or chakram-like weapons which return when thrown), different knives, silver stakes, and firearms. He also uses specialized weapons, such as throwable injector canisters filled with an anticoagulant which is explosively lethal to vampires, and extendable injector spikes worn on the back of the hand.

=== Anime ===
In addition to all his above skills and powers, Blade's swordsmanship in particular is shown in Marvel Anime to be especially advanced. Blade's sword-style revolves mainly around his mastery of Yagu Shinkage-ryu, a kenjutsu art that can unleash powerful shockwaves or transparent wind blades from his sword swings, allowing him to blast or slice his opponents from a distance. The Yagu Shinkage-ryu also has three principal Yagyu techniques. The first technique, "The First Blade: Residual Moon", draws a small circle with the tip of his sword, producing a perfectly tangible after-image of himself for diversions. The second technique, "The Second Blade: Phantom Moon", involves a high-speed spin, allowing Blade to launch an omnidirectional slash in rapid succession with such intensity that it sets his strike ablaze. The final technique, "The Third Blade: Chaotic Moon", launches several shadow blades around the opponent, hiding the user's attack path with little chance of being noticed.

== Other versions ==
=== Marvel Zombies ===
An alternate universe version of Blade appears in Marvel Zombies. He initially appears as a member of a resistance against the zombie forces, but is later shown to have been infected.

=== Secret Wars ===
An alternate universe version of Blade from Earth-61610 appears in Secret Wars as a member of the Thor Corps.

=== Ultimate Marvel ===
An alternate universe version of Blade appears in the Ultimate Marvel imprint. This version has numerous small scars across his eyes and cheeks and was dubbed the Daywalker by the Daily Bugle.

Blade is one of the many heroes recruited by Nick Fury in Ultimate Comics: Avengers to combat an army of vampires. The vampire invasion is revealed to have been facilitated by Anthony, a vampire hunter like Blade who was turned into a vampire and put his mind and strategy into infecting the superhero community to dominate the world. Blade is incarcerated below the Triskelion, as he cannot be trusted until the situation is over. When vampires assault the Triskelion, Blade is let out by his handlers and allowed to confront the vampires. Nick Fury later convinces Blade to join a black ops group by promising to bring him Deacon Frost, the recently captured vampire who is responsible for his condition.

== Marv Wolfman lawsuit ==
In 1997, on the eve of the impending release of the Blade film, Marv Wolfman sued Marvel Characters Inc. over ownership of all characters he had created for Marvel Comics, including Blade and Deacon Frost. A ruling in Marvel's favor was handed down on November 6, 2000. Wolfman's legal argument was that Blade and Deacon Frost fell under the definition of the "Siegel exception" to the default determination of work-made-for-hire that applied to pre-1978 material for which there was no express agreement to the contrary. The "Siegel exception" states that work not created at the commissioning party's instance and expense cannot be considered work-made-for-hire. Federal district court judge Roderick McKelvie, who presided over the case, wrote in his decision that Wolfman had "not provided the court with sufficient evidence to show that he developed Blade and Deacon Frost before the publication" in Tomb of Dracula, and therefore the Siegel exception did not apply.

== Reception ==
IGN ranked Blade as the 63rd greatest comic character, stating that Blade is the most iconic hero to spring from the period of monster-themed stories. UGO Networks placed Blade as one of the top heroes of entertainment, quoting that "Blade has to get props for being the most obscure Marvel character to ever get a film deal...and television deal, too!" Blade was ranked 4th on a listing of Marvel Comics' monster characters in 2015.

In 2021, Screen Rant included Blade in their "Marvel: 10 Most Powerful Vampires" list.

In 2022, CBR.com ranked Blade 1st in their "10 Most Important Marvel Vampires" list.

== In other media ==
=== Television ===
- Blade appears in Spider-Man: The Animated Series, voiced by J.D. Hall. This version was the son of a male vampire who had fallen in love with a human woman, who left him in foster care before she became a vampire herself.
- Blade appears in Blade: The Series, portrayed by Sticky Fingaz. Set after the events of Blade: Trinity, this version's birth name is Eric Brooks, and he was born in Detroit. Additionally, his father is Robert Brooks, who raised him until he was 12, when his vampiric nature became more apparent.
- Blade appears in Marvel Anime: Blade, voiced by Akio Ōtsuka in the Japanese version and Harold Perrineau in the English dub. Additionally, Junko Minagawa and Noah Bentley voice a younger Blade in the Japanese version and English dub, respectively. This version had to kill his vampire-converted mother in self-defense and was trained in vampire-hunting by Noah van Helsing and Tanba Yagyo.
- Blade appears in the Ultimate Spider-Man two-part episode "Blade and the Howling Commandos", voiced by Terry Crews. This version sports tattoos of ancient runes on his scalp and is a former member of Nick Fury's Howling Commandos who left for unknown reasons.
- Blade appears in Hulk and the Agents of S.M.A.S.H., voiced again by Terry Crews. This version is again a member of Nick Fury's Howling Commandos.
- Blade appears in Marvel Disk Wars: The Avengers, voiced by Hiroki Yasumoto in the Japanese version and Beau Billingslea in the English dub.
- Blade appears in Marvel Zombies, voiced by Todd Williams. This version adopts the mantle of Moon Knight.

=== Film ===
Wesley Snipes as the titular character in the Blade film series.

- Blade appears in a trilogy of films from New Line Cinema, portrayed by Wesley Snipes. The first, Blade, was released in 1998, and presented the character as stoic while revising his powers and weaknesses. Rather than a normal human with immunity to vampirism, the film version is a dhampir with vampiric powers and a bloodthirst, the latter of which is controlled through a special serum. The film was financially successful and received two sequels, Blade II (2002) and Blade: Trinity (2004). Snipes would then reprise the role in Deadpool & Wolverine (2024).
- By August 2012, the film rights to Blade had reverted to Marvel Studios, and a script for a new film was ready by May 2013. By July 2015, Snipes and Marvel had discussed the actor reprising his role. A crossover with the Underworld film series had also been discussed, but was rejected because Marvel Studios wanted to introduce Blade into the Marvel Cinematic Universe (MCU). Mahershala Ali had been cast as Blade in July 2019. In 2021, Stacy Amma Osei-Kuffour was hired to write the script in February while Bassam Tariq was confirmed to direct in September. Tariq left a year later due to the film's production shifts, when Beau DeMayo joined to rewrite the script. Yann Demange was hired to direct in November 2022, with Michael Starrbury doing a page-one rewrite. Further rewrites were conducted by Nic Pizzolatto in April 2023 and Michael Green in November 2023. The film was planned to begin principal photography following the 2023 Writers Guild of America strike, at Tyler Perry Studios, Atlanta. In July 2026, Ali announced that he had moved on from the role and would no longer star as Blade.
- Ali makes an uncredited vocal cameo appearance as Blade in a post-credits scene for Eternals.

=== Video games ===
- Blade, based on Wesley Snipes' portrayal, appears as a playable character in the Blade film tie-in game, voiced by Redd Pepper.
- Blade, based on Wesley Snipes' portrayal, appears as a playable character in the Blade II film tie-in game, voiced by Tom Clarke Hill.
- Blade appears as a playable character in Marvel: Ultimate Alliance, voiced by Khary Payton.
- Blade appears as an assist character in Spider-Man: Friend or Foe, voiced again by Khary Payton.
- Blade appears in Marvel Pinball.
- Blade appears as a playable character in Marvel Puzzle Quest.
- Blade appears as a playable character in Marvel Heroes, voiced by Dave Fennoy.
- Blade appears as a playable character in Marvel Contest of Champions.
- Blade appears as a playable character in Lego Marvel Super Heroes 2, voiced again by Tom Clarke Hill.
- Blade appears as a downloadable playable character in Marvel Ultimate Alliance 3: The Black Order, voiced by Imari Williams.
- Blade appears in Marvel Duel.
- Blade appears as a purchasable outfit in Fortnite Battle Royale.
- Blade appears as a playable character in Marvel's Midnight Suns, voiced by Michael Jai White.
- Blade appears as a playable character in Marvel Rivals, voiced by Gabe Kunda in English.
- Blade appears as a playable character in Marvel Tokon: Fighting Souls voiced by Imari Williams in English, with Junichi Suwabe reprises his role in Japanese since dubbing Mahershala Ali's Blade character in the post-credits of Marvel Cinematic Universe's 2021 movie Eternals and an animated series Marvel Zombies. This version is a member of the Samurai Outriders, which was coined by his teammate, Deadpool. Additionally, before the event, the version of Blade went to Japan to train his swordsmanship and eventually acquires an immortal killer sword Muramasa.
- Blade will appear in Marvel's Blade.

== Collected editions ==
Title	Material collected	Published date	ISBN
Blade: The Early Years	Tomb of Dracula #10, 12–14, 24, 30, 41–43, 45, 51, 53, 58, Marvel Preview #3, Fear #24, Doctor Strange (vol. 2) #61–62, 67, Tomb of Dracula (vol. 2) #1–4; Material from Tomb of Dracula #17–19, 21, 44, 46–50, 52, Vampire Tales #8–9, Marvel Preview #8, Marvel Comics Presents #64	November 2023	978-1302950231
Blade the Vampire-Slayer: Black & White	Vampire Tales #8–9, Marvel Preview #3, 8, Marvel: Shadows and Light #1, Blade (vol. 1) #1	December 2004	978-0785114697
Blade: Undead by Daylight	The Tomb of Dracula #10, 24, 58, Blade: Crescent City Blues #1	November 2015	978-0785194392
Blade: Blood and Chaos	Blade: Crescent City Blues #1, Marvel Team-Up (vol. 2) #7, Blade: Sins of the Father #1, Blade (vol. 2) #1–3, Gambit (vol. 3) #4, Peter Parker: Spider-Man (vol. 2) #7–8, Blade Blade: Vampire Hunter #1–6,1/2	October 2018	978-1302914219
Blade Vol. 1: Undead Again	Blade (vol. 4) #1–6	May 2007	978-0785123644
Blade Vol. 2: Sins of the Father	Blade (vol. 4) #7–12	October 2007	978-0785123651
Blade by Marc Guggenheim: The Complete Collection	Blade (vol. 4) #1–12, Wolverine Vs. Blade Special #1	March 2020	978-1302923204
X-Men: Curse of the Mutants: Mutants vs. Vampires	X-Men: Curse Of The Mutants – Blade and X-Men: Curse Of The Mutants – Storm & Gambit, X-Men: Curse Of The Mutants – Smoke & Blood, X-Men Vs. Vampires #1–2, Uncanny X-Men #159	March 2011	978-0785152941
Avenging Spider-Man: Threats and Menaces	Spider-Man vs. Vampires and Avenging Spider-Man #14–15, Avenging Spider-Man Annual #1, Amazing Spider-Man Annual #39, Amazing Spider-Man #692	May 2013	978-0785165736
The Darkhold	The Darkhold: Blade #1 and The Darkhold: Alpha #1, The Darkhold: Wasp #1, The Darkhold: Iron Man #1, The Darkhold: Black Bolt #1, The Darkhold: Spider-Man #1, The Darkhold: Omega #1	March 2022	978-1302925840
Death of Doctor Strange Companion	Death Of Doctor Strange: Blade #1 and Death Of Doctor Strange: Bloodstone #1, Death Of Doctor Strange: Avengers #1, Strange Academy Presents: The Death Of Doctor Strange #1, Death Of Doctor Strange: Spider-Man #1, Death Of Doctor Strange: White Fox #1, Death Of Doctor Strange: X-Men/Black Knight #1	March 2022	978-1302933104

== See also ==
- List of dhampirs
