= Janus (Marvel Comics) =

Publication information
- Publisher: Marvel Comics
- First appearance: Angel: The Tomb of Dracula #51 (December 1976); Janus: The Tomb of Dracula #54 (March 1977)
- Created by: Marv Wolfman and Gene Colan

In-story information
- Alter ego: Janus Tepes
- Notable aliases: The Golden Angel, Son of Dracula

Janus is a character appearing in American comic books published by Marvel Comics. Created by Marv Wolfman and Gene Colan, he first appeared in The Tomb of Dracula #54 (March 1977). The angel which went on to possess Janus was introduced several issues earlier, in The Tomb of Dracula #51 (December 1976).

== Fictional character biography ==
The Golden Angel is a possessing spirit who claims to be an angel, a messenger and warrior of God. The angel previously battled Dracula, who killed him in battle.

Dracula and his wife Domini mystically conceive a child named Janus using a spell provided to them by Anton Lupeski, intending to use the baby in their plan for world domination. Janus is accidentally shot and killed by Lupeski, but is resurrected by Domini, who has the Golden Angel possess him. Janus is rapidly aged into an adult as a result of his resurrection and goes on to become Dracula's enemy.

When Quincy Harker kills Dracula, the Golden Angel abandons Janus' body, causing him to return to his true age as an infant. Janus appears as an adult in the storyline "Curse of the Mutants", where he battles the Claw Sect and his brother Xarus.

== Powers and abilities ==
As an angel sent by the forces of Heaven to Earth, Janus possesses superhuman strength, weather-controlling powers and immunity to Dracula's vampiric hypnotic powers, as well as being able to break his hypnotic hold over others. Janus can fire beams of concussive force from his eyes, radiate blinding light, place people in temporal stasis, teleport himself and others at least thousands of miles, create illusory images, and transform into a golden eagle, retaining wings in humanoid form if desired.
