= The Tomb of Dracula =

American comic book series by Marvel Comics

- The Tomb of Dracula #1 (April 1972); Cover art by Neal Adams

Publication information
- Publisher: Marvel Comics
- Schedule: Monthly
- Format: Ongoing series
- Genre: Vampire
- Publication date: April 1972 – August 1979
- No. of issues: 70
- Main character: Count Dracula

Creative team
- Written by: Gerry Conway, Archie Goodwin, Gardner Fox, Marv Wolfman
- Penciller: Gene Colan
- Inker: Tom Palmer

Collected editions
- Essential Tomb of Dracula: Volume 1: ISBN 0-7851-0920-X

The Tomb of Dracula is an American horror comic book series published by Marvel Comics from April 1972 to August 1979. The 70-issue series featured a group of vampire hunters who fought Count Dracula and other supernatural menaces. On rare occasions, Dracula would work with these vampire hunters against a common threat or battle other supernatural threats on his own, but more often than not, he was the antagonist rather than protagonist. In addition to his supernatural battles in this series, Marvel's Dracula often served as a supervillain to other characters in the Marvel Universe, battling the likes of Blade the Vampire Slayer, Spider-Man, the Werewolf, the X-Men, Howard the Duck, and the licensed Robert E. Howard character Solomon Kane.

== Publication history ==
=== Original series ===
In 1971, the Comics Code Authority relaxed some of its longstanding rules regarding horror comics, such as a virtual ban on vampires. Marvel had already tested the waters with a "quasi-vampire" character, Morbius, the Living Vampire, but the company was now prepared to launch a regular vampire title as part of its new line of horror books. After some discussion, it was decided to use the Dracula character, in large part because it was the most famous vampire to the general public, and also because Bram Stoker's creation and secondary characters were by that time in the public domain.

The series suffered from lack of direction for its first year; most significantly, each of the first three issues was plotted by a different writer. Though Gerry Conway is credited as sole writer of issue #1, the plot was actually written by Roy Thomas and editor Stan Lee, and Conway had no input into the issue until it had already been fully drawn. Conway was allowed to plot issue #2 by himself, and wrote a story heavily influenced by the British Hammer Films—a departure from the first issue, which was derivative of Universal's monster movies. Conway then quit the book due to an overabundance of writing assignments, and was replaced by Archie Goodwin with issue #3. Goodwin quit after only two issues, but also made major changes to the series's direction, including the introduction of cast members Rachel Van Helsing and Taj Nital. New writer Gardner Fox took the series in yet another direction, and introduced a romance between Frank Drake and Rachel Van Helsing, which would remain a subplot for the rest of the series. However, Thomas (who had by this time succeeded Lee as the editor of The Tomb of Dracula) felt that Fox's take did not work, and took him off the book after only two issues.

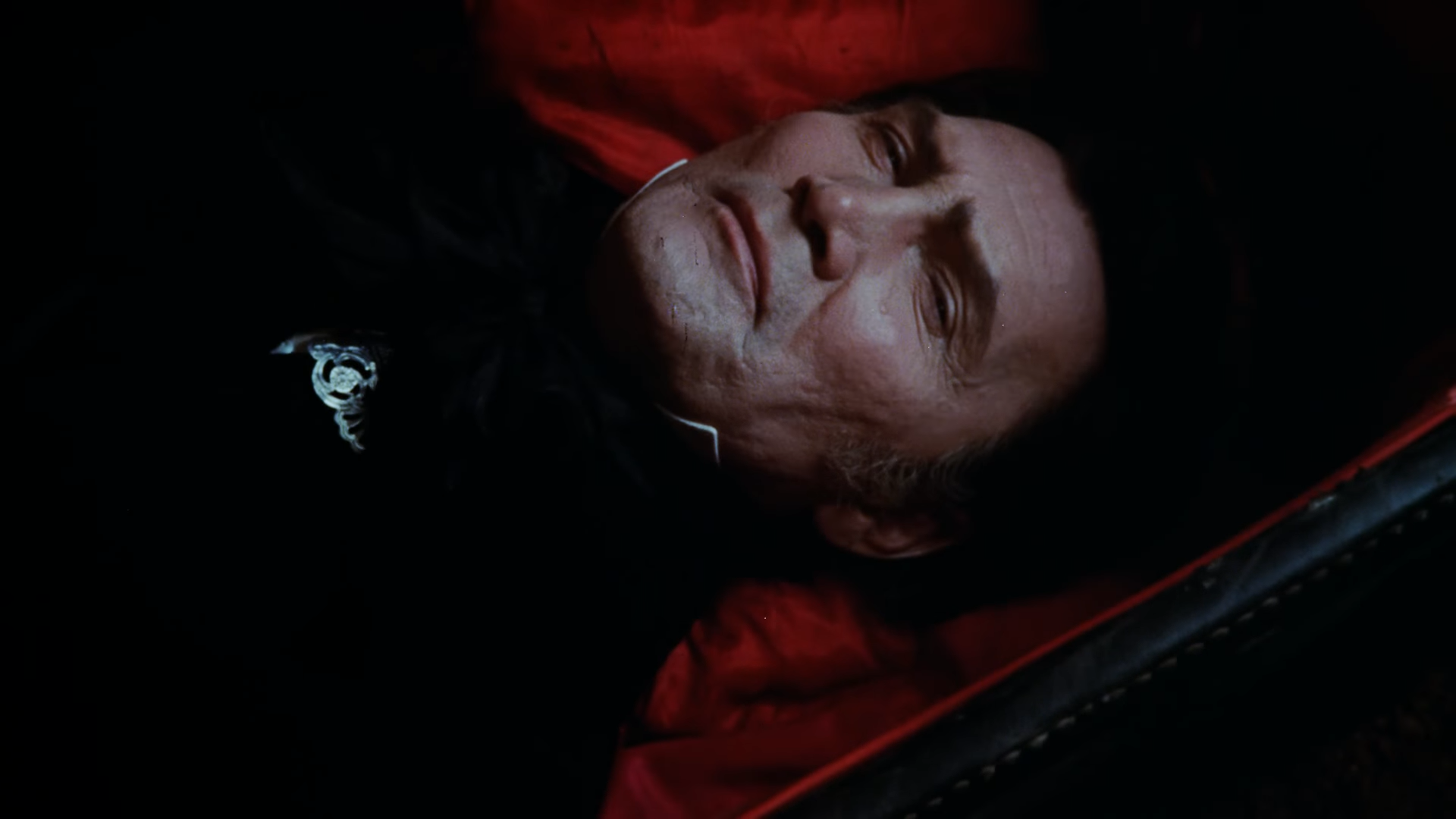
Count Dracula as portrayed by Jack Palance in Bram Stoker's Dracula. Gene Colan based his Dracula's appearance on Palance.

The title gained stability and hit its stride when Marv Wolfman became scripter with the seventh issue, though Wolfman himself has contended that he was floundering on the series until the story arc in issues #12-14, remarking, "This storyline is when I finally figured out what this book was about." The entire run of The Tomb of Dracula was penciled by Gene Colan, with Tom Palmer inking all but #1, 2, and 8-11. Gil Kane drew many of the covers for the first few years, as he did for many other Marvel titles. Colan based the visual appearance of Marvel's Dracula not on Bela Lugosi, Christopher Lee, or any other actor who had played the vampire on film, but rather on actor Jack Palance. Palance would play Dracula in a television production of Stoker's novel the year after The Tomb of Dracula debuted.

Colan, already one of Marvel's most well-established and prominent artists, said he had lobbied for the assignment.

When I heard Marvel was putting out a Dracula book, I confronted [editor] Stan [Lee] about it and asked him to let me do it. He didn't give me too much trouble but, as it turned out, he took that promise away, saying he had promised it to Bill Everett. Well, right then and there I auditioned for it. Stan didn't know what I was up to, but I spent a day at home and worked up a sample, using Jack Palance as my inspiration and sent it to Stan. I got a call that very day: "It's yours."

Wolfman and Colan developed a bond while working on the series, on which they collaborated closely. Colan recalled, "He'd give me a written plot, but he'd also discuss it with me over the phone. I tended to ask questions, rather than to have him assume I got the idea."

Dracula encountered the Werewolf in a crossover story beginning in The Tomb of Dracula #18 (March 1974) and continuing the same month in Werewolf by Night #15 with both chapters written by Wolfman. A brief meeting between Dracula and Spider-Man occurred in the first issue of Giant-Size Spider-Man. The Tomb of Dracula #44 featured a crossover story with Doctor Strange #14, another series which was being drawn by Colan at the time. The Tomb of Dracula ran for 70 issues until August 1979. Comics historian Les Daniels noted that "With an unbroken run of seventy issues over the course of more than seven years, Marvel's The Tomb of Dracula was the most successful comic book series to feature a villain as its title character." As cancellation loomed, Wolfman made to wrap up the storyline and lingering threads by issue #72. But Jim Shooter, then the editor-in-chief, retroactively cut two issues after the artwork had been completed for three. As Wolfman recalled,

I think I realized we were doing a finite story and to continue that storyline would have pushed it into repetition. ... I wrote the final three issues and they were drawn. Jim was someone that when he liked you there was nothing he wouldn't do for you, and when he didn't, there was nothing he would do. He and I had butted heads often since I had been editor-in-chief before him ... and I was also the editor of TOD, which rankled him as I didn't have to listen to his ideas. Anyway, I said the stories were done and I needed the room. He gave me a double-sized last issue, I really needed a triple-sized book. I was stuck and had to find a way to cut 14 pages from the printed book. Thank God I hadn't dialogued them all yet, so I cut [up] pages, rearranged stuff then dialogued it so it read smoothly.'

Twelve of those pages, which Wolfman had saved as photocopies, appeared in the hardcover reprint collection The Tomb of Dracula Omnibus Vol. 2. The series culminated with the death of Quincy Harker and Dracula's apparent death and dispersal.

In 2010, Comics Bulletin ranked Wolfman, Colan, and Palmer's run on The Tomb of Dracula fifth on its list of the "Top 10 1970s Marvels".

=== Dracula Lives! ===
A black-and-white magazine, Dracula Lives!, published by "Marvel Monster Group", ran from 1973 to 1975. Dracula Lives! ran 13 issues plus a reprint Super Annual issue. Running concurrently with Tomb of Dracula, the continuities of the two titles occasionally overlapped, with storylines weaving between the two. Most of the time the stories in Dracula Lives! were stand-alone tales, including a serialized adaptation of the original Bram Stoker novel, in 10- to 12-page installments written by Roy Thomas and drawn by Dick Giordano.

=== Giant-Size Dracula ===
Tomb of Dracula was supplemented by a Giant-Size companion quarterly comic book that ran for five issues in the mid-1970s. Artist John Byrne's first story for Marvel Comics, "Dark Asylum", was published in Giant-Size Dracula #5 (June 1975).

=== Black-and-white magazine ===
The color title Tomb of Dracula was succeeded by another black-and-white magazine, also called The Tomb of Dracula, with stories also drawn by Gene Colan that picked up where the color title left off. It lasted six issues from 1979 to 1980.

=== Post-series Dracula appearances ===
Several years later, Dracula encountered the X-Men twice. Although Dracula (and all other vampires in the Marvel Universe) was eventually destroyed by the mystical Montesi Formula in the pages of Doctor Strange #62 (December 1983), the vampire lord was revived. Marvel published a four-issue Tomb of Dracula miniseries, reuniting Wolfman and Colan, under its Epic Comics imprint in 1991, and revived Dracula and his foes in the short-lived Nightstalkers and Blade series in the 1990s. Some unresolved plot threads from The Tomb of Dracula were addressed in the final three issues of Nightstalkers. These included the fates of Dracula's bride Domini, their son Janus, and vampire-hunter Taj Nital. Dracula took the title role in the miniseries Dracula: Lord of the Undead.

Two more four-issue miniseries followed. Stoker's Dracula continued and concluded the adaptation of the original Bram Stoker novel Dracula by writer Roy Thomas and artist Dick Giordano, which had begun in Dracula Lives 30 years prior. Another Tomb of Dracula miniseries followed with Blade joining a new team of vampire hunters to prevent Dracula's achieving godhood. Apocalypse vs. Dracula featured Dracula battling Apocalypse, an immortal foe of the superhero team the X-Men, in Victorian London.

=== The Curse of Dracula ===
Marv Wolfman and Gene Colan returned to Dracula comics with The Curse of Dracula, a three-issue miniseries published in 1998. The miniseries was published by Dark Horse Comics and was not officially associated with Marvel's Dracula series. A trade paperback collection was published in 2005.

== Major characters ==
Dracula attempting to "vampirize" Rachel van Helsing in The Tomb of Dracula #40 (January 1976). Art by Gene Colan and Tom Palmer.

- Dracula
- Quincy Harker, the son of Jonathan and Mina and disabled leader of the vampire hunters; he died in a battle with Dracula.
- Rachel van Helsing, the granddaughter of Abraham Van Helsing and leader of the vampire hunters upon Harker's death; she was turned into a vampire by Dracula and subsequently given a mercy killing by Wolverine of the X-Men.
- Blade the Vampire Slayer, the son of a woman bitten by a vampire during childbirth and a valued, yet reluctant ally to Quincy Harker's band of vampire hunters. Blade possesses quasi-vampiric abilities, including a greatly prolonged lifespan and the ability to sense supernatural creatures, as well as an immunity to complete vampirism.
- Frank Drake, the last living mortal descendant of Dracula and a charter member of Quincy Harker's vampire hunters. Note: Drake's bloodline is based on one of Dracula's marriages prior to his vampirism.
- Hannibal King, a vampire hunter and private investigator who is himself a reluctant vampire, frequent partner of Blade and Drake. He subsisted solely on blood he acquired from blood banks or corpses he found and had never taken blood directly from a human being, thus he was able to survive the Montesi Formula and be restored to normal human form.
- Taj Nital, a mute Indian Muslim vampire hunter of considerable strength (sufficient to temporarily restrain Dracula) whose son Adri was vampirized. He was later transformed into a vampire himself and destroyed in Nightstalkers #18.
- Safron Caulder, a showgirl from London and Blade's recurring girlfriend. She sometimes found herself a typical damsel in distress, but was always rescued by Blade despite an instance when he was nearly tricked into staking her.
- Lilith, the daughter of Dracula, an immortal vampire who was cursed to never die until her father was permanently destroyed; when slain, she was reborn into the body of an innocent woman who wanted her father dead.
- Deacon Frost, the vampire responsible for the death of Blade's mother and Hannibal King's vampirism. He was an upstart contender for the title of Lord of the Vampires, a title held by Dracula at the time.
- Harold H. Harold, a hack writer who befriended the vampire hunters in an effort to get material for a book he was writing. He fell victim to Dracula and became a vampire (in Howard the Duck magazine #5)—though this did not stop him from becoming a successful Hollywood film producer. Like all vampires, he perished as a result of the casting of the Montesi Formula.
- Anton Lupeski, a Satanic priest through whom Dracula manipulated his Satanic cult while impersonating Satan.
- Domini, a member of Anton Lupeski's cult whom Dracula chose as his bride.
- Janus, the son of Dracula and Domini, who was possessed by a being called the Golden Angel. He was returned to his child form and at age five was kidnapped by the vampire Varnae.
- Varnae, the first vampire (and, at one point, an enemy of Conan the Barbarian). He was the Lord of the Vampires prior to Dracula. Although he died in the process of making Dracula his heir, he was later revived. He was inspired by the 19th century character Varney the Vampire.
- Nimrod the First, another Lord of the Vampires prior to Dracula, who killed him in Nimrod's first appearance (Dracula Lives! #3). When Dracula's origin was revised in Bizarre Adventures #33, Nimrod was no longer the true Lord of the Vampires; instead, he was a mentally imbalanced servant of Varnae and had been empowered by his master as a test of Dracula's worthiness to become Varnae's heir.
- Mina Harker is the mother of Quincy Harker and the bride of Dracula. She died in a great battle, but she was turned into a vampire by her husband Dracula. She acts like a human rather than a vampire. She is the Queen of Romania.

== Collected editions ==
- Essential Tomb of Dracula
  - Volume 1 collects Tomb of Dracula #1–25, Werewolf By Night #15, Giant-Size Chillers featuring The Curse of Dracula #1, 560 pages, 2004, Panini, ISBN 1-904159-62-1, Marvel, ISBN 978-0785109204
  - Volume 2 collects Tomb of Dracula #26–49, Dr. Strange #14, Giant-Size Dracula #2–5, 592 pages, April 2004, Panini, ISBN 1-905239-05-X, |Marvel, ISBN 978-0785114611
  - Volume 3 collects Tomb of Dracula #50–70, The Tomb of Dracula magazine #1–4, 584 pages, 2004, Panini, ISBN 1-905239-06-8, Marvel, ISBN 978-0785115588
  - Volume 4 collects Tomb of Dracula magazine #2, 4–6, Dracula Lives! #1–13, Frankenstein Monster #7–9, 576 pages, April 2005, Panini, ISBN 1-905239-20-3, Marvel, ISBN 978-0785117094

Some of the nudity was removed from the fourth volume. Publisher Dan Buckley explained, "That wasn't because we were going to bookstores, or because we were exclusively going to hobby shops. It probably had more with where we were at from a ratings standpoint and the editors felt that was the appropriate thing to do, considering how we communicate what's going on in our books from a packaging standpoint. ...We generally avoid nudity, unless it's a MAX title. We don't want to take an Essential volume and start calling it MAX; then you get into branding issues." Retailers' opinions on the matter were split.

- Tomb of Dracula Omnibus
  - Volume 1 collects The Tomb of Dracula #1–31, Werewolf by Night #15, Giant-Size Chillers featuring The Curse of Dracula #1, and Giant-Size Dracula #2–4, 784 pages, November 2008, ISBN 978-0785127789
  - Volume 2 collects The Tomb of Dracula #32–70, Giant-Size Dracula #5, and Dr. Strange #14, 816 pages, December 2009, ISBN 978-0785135760
  - Volume 3 collects Tomb of Dracula magazine #1–6, Frankenstein Monster #7–9, and Dracula Lives! #1–13, 944 pages, January 2011, ISBN 978-0785135784
- The Tomb of Dracula color trade paperbacks
  - Volume 1 collects Tomb of Dracula #1–12, 264 pages, July 2010, ISBN 978-0785143864
  - Volume 2 collects Tomb of Dracula #13–23, Werewolf by Night #15, Giant-Size Chillers featuring The Curse of Dracula #1, 272 pages, October 2010, ISBN 978-0785149224
  - Volume 3 collects Tomb of Dracula #24–31, Giant-Size Dracula #2–4, 248 pages, January 2011, ISBN 978-0785149835
- The Tomb of Dracula - The Complete Collection
  - Volume 1 collects The Tomb of Dracula #1–15 and Dracula Lives #1–4, 512 pages, October 2017, ISBN 978-1-302-90931-4
  - Volume 2 collects The Tomb of Dracula #16–24, Werewolf By Night #15, Giant-Size Spider-Man #1, Giant-Size Chillers #1, Giant-Size Dracula #2, Frankenstein #7–9 and Dracula Lives #5–7, 497 pages, October 2018, ISBN 978-1-302-91396-0
  - Volume 3 collects The Tomb of Dracula #25–35, Giant-Size Dracula #3–4, and Dracula Lives #8–12, 496 pages, October 2019, ISBN 978-1-302-92036-4
  - Volume 4 collects The Tomb of Dracula #36–54, Doctor Strange #14, Dracula Lives #12–13, and material from Legion of Monsters #1, 488 pages, September 2020, ISBN 978-1-302-92404-1
  - Volume 5 collects Tomb of Dracula #55–70, Stoker's Dracula #2–4, and material from Marvel Preview #12 and Savage Sword of Conan #26
- Tomb of Dracula Masterworks Vol 1
- Marvel Masterworks - Tomb of Dracula Vol. 1 (Marvel Masterworks: The Tomb of Dracula) Hardcover – October 26, 2021
  Volume 1 collects Tomb of Dracula (1972) 1-11; material from Dracula Lives (1973) 1-2 , 320 pages, 2021, Marvel, ISBN 978-1302929473

== Other media ==
=== TV movie ===
- Dracula: Sovereign of the Damned

闇の帝王 吸血鬼ドラキュラ (Yami no Teiō: Kyūketsuki Dorakyura)
- Genre: Vampire film
- Anime television film
- Directed by: Minoru Okazaki
- Produced by: Yoshiaki Koizumi; Yoshifumi Hatano; Takeyuki Suzuki
- Written by: Tadaaki Yamazaki
- Music by: Seiji Yokoyama
- Studio: Toei Animation
- Licensed by: Marvel Entertainment
- Original network: TV Asahi
- Released: August 19, 1980
- Runtime: 94 minutes

In 1980, an anime television movie based on The Tomb of Dracula was released titled Dracula: Sovereign of the Damned (闇の帝王 吸血鬼ドラキュラ, Yami no Teiō: Kyūketsuki Dorakyura; lit. The Emperor of Darkness: The Vampire Dracula). Much of the main plot was condensed and many characters and subplots were truncated or omitted. The film was animated in Japan by Toei and sparsely released on cable TV in North America in 1983 by Harmony Gold dubbed into English under the title Dracula: Sovereign of the Damned. On October 31, 2022, Kineko Video released a remastered 4K scan of the film's original 16mm print.

==== Voice cast ====
Character	Japanese voice actor	English dubbing actor
Dracula	Kenji Utsumi	Ted Layman
Domini	Hiroko Suzuki	Arlene Banas
Janus	Kazuyuki Sogabe	Max Christian
Quincy Harker	Yasuo Hisamatsu	
Rachel van Helsing	Mami Koyama	Melanie MacQueen
Frank Drake	Keiichi Noda	Dan Woren
Satan	Hidekatsu Shibata	Richard Epcar
Lilith	Reiko Katsura	Edie Mirman
Anton Lupeski	Junpei Takiguchi	L. Michael Haller
Torgo	Yasuo Tanaka	Robert V. Barron
Saint	Ryō Ishihara	
Narrator	Ryō Ishihara	Stan Jones

=== Film ===
Blade, a character introduced in The Tomb of Dracula, has been featured in four films: Blade (1998), Blade II (2002), Blade: Trinity (2004), and the Marvel Cinematic Universe film Deadpool & Wolverine (2024), as well as a short-lived television series titled Blade: The Series (2006). Other Tomb of Dracula characters, Deacon Frost and Hannibal King, have been featured in these films (Frost in Blade, King in Blade: Trinity), albeit in heavily revised forms. Reference to the Tomb of Dracula series is made in Blade: Trinity when King shows an issue of the comic to Blade.

Dracula himself does not appear in the series until Blade: Trinity, in which he goes by the name of "Drake" and features an origin and powers that differ from the comics. He is played in the film by Dominic Purcell. Given Drake's age and origin, he, more than any other vampire that followed, can harness a much greater and more dynamic range of abilities. He possesses superhuman strength, much greater than that of Blade, as well as incredible speed. Like those he sired, he is capable of leaping great distances and seems to be knowledgeable of sword fighting techniques, even rivaling Blade himself. Drake's true power is derived from his origin as the first of his species. The manipulation of energies which led to his first resurrection left Drake with two forms: human and a demonic alter ego. In this form, Drake is much stronger, resilient to all forms of damage and much taller than his human form. He possesses very keen senses, allowing him, for example, to catch an arrow in mid-air.
