= Dracula (Marvel Comics) =

Marvel Comics fictional character

- Dracula as depicted in The Avengers #14 (February 2019). Art by David Marquez.

Publication information
- Publisher: Marvel Comics
- First appearance: The Tomb of Dracula #1 (April 1972); Suspense #7 (March 1951, retroactive)
- Created by: Gerry Conway; Gene Colan; Marv Wolfman; Bram Stoker (original literary character)

In-story information
- Alter ego: Vlad Dracula
- Species: Vampire
- Place of origin: Earth
- Team affiliations: Vampires; Legion of the Unliving; Defenders
- Notable aliases: Count Dracula; Justin Drake; Dr. Vlad; Vlad the Impaler; Dagon; Count Orlok; Alucard; Dondora; Frank Drake; Drake
- Abilities: Superhuman strength, speed, agility, stamina, and reflexes; Regenerative healing factor; Weather control; Shapeshifting; Mind control; Immortality; Hypnotism; Telepathy; Levitation; Flight; Gifted intellect; Skilled swordsman; Skilled hand-to-hand combatant

Dracula is a fictional character appearing in American comic books published by Marvel Comics. He is based on the vampire Count Dracula from the novel of the same name by author Bram Stoker. After the initial run of the series The Tomb of Dracula, the character has been depicted primarily as an antagonist to superheroes in the Marvel Universe.

The character appeared in the film Blade: Trinity (2004) as Drake, primarily portrayed by Dominic Purcell in his normal form and performed by Brian Steele in his "Beast" form.

== Publication history ==
The cover of The Tomb of Dracula vol. 1 #1 (April 1972), in which Gerry Conway and Gene Colan's iteration of Bram Stoker's character made his debut. Cover by Neal Adams.

The Marvel Comics version of Dracula was created by Gerry Conway and Gene Colan and first appeared in The Tomb of Dracula #1 (April 1972), co-written by Marv Wolfman. A different version of Dracula had previously appeared in the Atlas Comics (Marvel's predecessor company) publication Suspense #7 ("Dracula Lives!" by unknown writer/artist, March 1951).

Traditionally, the Comics Code Authority prevented Marvel from publishing vampire comics. This was revised in early 1971, when comics were allowed to publish characters and beings from established literary works. Later that year, Morbius the Living Vampire appeared in The Amazing Spider-Man for the first time, and Dracula followed in his own title some months later. The character starred in the comic, which ended with issue #70 in 1979. This version of Dracula also starred in Dracula Lives!, a black-and-white horror comic magazine series published by Marvel from 1973 to 1975. Running concurrently with The Tomb of Dracula, the continuities of the two titles occasionally overlapped, with storylines weaving between the two.

The Tomb of Dracula initially kept its distance from the rest of the company's properties. Marv Wolfman said, "To me, the horror books were outside the Marvel Universe. It was a hard enough problem creating mood, tension, and suspense in a comic book, which is all still pictures. But to then have to worry about superheroes or supervillains at the same time — I didn't feel that would work." But the potential for a sales-boosting crossover eventually became too tempting, and Dracula appeared in the first issue of Giant-Size Spider-Man (July 1974). Marvel also produced a comics adaptation of the Dracula novel that was published in Marvel Classic Comics #9 (1977).

Although Dracula (and all other vampires) were eventually destroyed by the mystical "Montesi Formula" in the pages of Doctor Strange, the vampire lord was revived. Marvel published a four-issue Tomb of Dracula miniseries, reuniting Wolfman and Colan, under its Epic Comics imprint in 1991, and revived Dracula and his foes in the short-lived Nightstalkers and Blade series in the 1990s. Dracula later took the title role in the miniseries Dracula: Lord of the Undead.

X-Men: Apocalypse vs. Dracula featured Dracula battling the X-Men antagonist Apocalypse in Victorian London.

The character returned in the Captain Britain and MI13 storyline "Vampire State", with Doctor Doom.

He was the main subject of the 2010 X-Men storyline "Curse of the Mutants", written by Victor Gischler. Here, he is redesigned to resemble a medieval warlord, sporting body armor and a ragged cape.

== Fictional character biography ==
=== Historical ===
Born Vlad Dracula in 1430 in Schassburg, Transylvania (now Sighișoara, Romania), he was the second son of a Transylvanian nobleman. He was named prince of Transylvania and voivode (prince) of Wallachia and became ruler while still a child. Over the next several years, he struggled against the Ottoman Turks, losing and regaining his throne. Through an arranged marriage to a Hungarian noblewoman, Zofia, he sired his daughter, Lilith. He sent his wife and daughter away and later married a woman named Maria, with whom he had a son named Vlad Tepelus. He had a son with his third wife Domini, who was named Janus.

In 1459, Dracula was mortally wounded by the Turkish warlord Turac, who brought Dracula to a gypsy named Lianda to be healed. However, Lianda was a vampire, and in revenge for his persecution of the gypsies, transformed Dracula into a vampire as well. Turac raped and killed Dracula's wife Maria, and in revenge Dracula slew Turac, making him a vampire as well. Dracula gave his son Vlad Tepelus to gypsies to raise.

Dracula defeated the vampire Nimrod in battle, and thus succeeded him as ruler of Earth's vampires. Soon afterwards, he enhanced his own blood with that of Varnae, giving him greater powers than any other vampire. In 1471, Dracula abdicated his princehood.

In the 19th century, he faced opposition from Abraham van Helsing and Jonathan Harker in England, the exploits of which were recorded in the 1897 novel by Bram Stoker, Dracula. When the humans destroyed Dracula, his remains were placed in his coffin, concealed within a cave blocked by an enormous boulder. Frankenstein's Monster was later tricked into unsealing the cave and opening the coffin, thus freeing Dracula. In later years, he also came in conflict with Cagliostro and Solomon Kane. Just before World War I, he was responsible for transforming Lord John Falsworth into Baron Blood.

=== The Tomb of Dracula ===
Count Dracula, as drawn by artist Gene Colan of The Tomb of Dracula series, paying homage to a scene from Bram Stoker's novel Dracula.

In the later half of the 20th century, Dracula was once more returned from death by Clifton Graves, and subsequently came into conflict with Quincy Harker and Rachel van Helsing.

After bringing the Cult of the Darkhold under his control, Dracula began to seek the power of the dark book to remove his vampiric weaknesses and make himself truly immortal. However, in his quest he was repeatedly foiled by the X-Men, the now-vampiric Rachel van Helsing and Lilith, Thor, Doctor Strange, Hannibal King and the Avengers.

Dracula had one apparent post-mortem appearance when the Grandmaster summoned him and a number of other deceased heroes and villains to challenge the Avengers.

=== Dracula's return (1994–present) ===
Dracula eventually returned when the effect of the Montesi Formula was negated. Hydra had also obtained a sample of Dracula's DNA and used it to create a clone named Bloodstorm One to serve as their vampiric superweapon, only for Bloodstorm One to escape their control.

In the 21st century, Dracula assembled an army of vampires in a sanctuary on the Moon and planned to conquer the United Kingdom, with other supernatural villains Lilith (a different entity from his daughter), Captain Fate, and Baron Blood. He first contacted Doctor Doom to agree to a non-aggression pact with him, and by association the Cabal, to be unopposed in his conquest. Once he'd secured this, he launched a pre-emptive strike on MI-13's superheroes, launching specially-bred vampires at the Earth like missiles.

It was also shown he still possessed contempt and bigotry towards Muslims, and intended to exterminate them once he had secured Great Britain; as part of his attack, he went to the parents of Faiza Hussain, attacking her mother and taking her father (along with Killpower, an MI-13 agent sent to protect the family) hostage. British vampire hero Spitfire, meanwhile, was abducted and forcibly turned into a minion. MI-13 were manipulated into exposing the whereabouts of Quincy Harker's remains, magically treated to prevent vampires from entering the U.K. without invitation, so Dracula could destroy them. Once that was done, with the help of Fate, he launched a series of warships towards Earth.

However, unknown to Dracula, Pete Wisdom had tricked him into destroying fake remains and Spitfire had been faking her mind control while channeling information to MI-13. To stop Dracula from finding out the remains were fake, he was briefly trapped in a demonic "Dream Corridor" which saw him live out his fantasies of victory. Once he escaped, there were a series of attacks to keep him occupied until the warships entered British airspace without invitation, wiping out the bulk of his forces.

In the final battle, he was pursued to his fortress and prevented from escaping by Black Knight and Faiza Hussain, wielder of the sword Excalibur. While Dracula was able to seriously wound the Black Knight, he was slain with a single blow from Excalibur, leaving Britain victorious.

In a 2010 X-Men storyline "Curse of the Mutants", Dracula has been killed by his son Xarus, but is resurrected by the X-Men in hopes that he would join them against Xarus. However, Dracula declines and leaves shortly after. Dracula reasserts himself as Lord of the Vampires, granting amnesty to those who sided with Xarus. When Xarus tries to attack Dracula, he rips off Xarus' head. Although he contemplated attacking the X-Men, Cyclops reminded him that they had custody of his body for 17 hours before the head was reattached, suggesting that they had included a 'contingency plan' in Dracula similar to the plan that they had used to infiltrate Xarus' forces by temporarily shutting down Wolverine's healing factor so that he could be turned and then returned to normal. Although Dracula suspected that Cyclops was bluffing, he complimented Cyclops's style and allowed them to depart, even returning the now-vampire Jubilee to the X-Men.

During the "Fear Itself" storyline, Dracula is informed of the arrival of the Hulk (in the form of Nul) by one of his followers when Nul lands in the Carpathian foothills following his fight with Thor and ends up taking down some vampires. It is revealed that he has the mysterious Raizo Kodo and his legion of vampires called "the Forgiven" locked up in his dungeon. Dracula frees the Forgiven, who worked to slow Nul's progress. Dracula then prepares the vampires for his last stand. As the Forgiven continue to stall Nul, Dracula prepares his vampire armies for battle when Nul gets closer. In the end, Nul is defeated when Inka uses a vampire-mesmerizing spell to take the form of Betty Ross, causing the Hulk to break free of the hammer's magic and revert to normal.

In "Dracula's Gauntlet", Dracula hired Deadpool to retrieve his fiancé, a succubus queen named Shiklah. On the way, she falls in love with him instead and, during the extended trip, her brothers are killed by Dracula to secure the kingdom of Monster Metropolis as his own. This causes Shiklah to deny him the throne by marrying Deadpool, driving Dracula into a rage not because of the power and kingdom he lost, but because he was cuckolded by "an escaped mental patient". After a fight in which he is stabbed with Deadpool's severed hand, poisoned by the mercenary's blood and his army mostly wiped out, Dracula flees into hiding, leaving Shiklah as Queen of the Monsters.

Possibly a little over a year later, there is trouble in his ex-fiancé's marriage. Shiklah has had enough of the humans and started a war to annex New York. Deadpool comes to Dracula for help in stopping her, threatening him with a wooden stake. Dracula cannot remember Shiklah's name at first, until Deadpool angrily reminds him. He states that he hates Deadpool, who replies that Dracula hates himself more, which actually makes him Shiklah's type. Once they return to New York, Dracula is able to gain control of the vampires in Shiklah's army to fight against her monsters. However, the second he meets Shiklah, he proposes to her — wanting to merge their kingdoms and rule with the humans at their feet. Deadpool angrily curses Dracula. Dracula and Shiklah are married by Mephisto, while an angry Deadpool and a confused Spider-Man are tied up and made to watch. Dracula and Shiklah share a kiss, and she thanks him for giving her the wedding she always wanted — with chaos and fire burning.

They head off to tell their followers of their union. However, Shiklah's monsters tell her that they do not wish to be ruled by a monarch any longer. Shiklah is shocked that her subjects want her run off, and Deadpool shows up to tell her that she cannot marry Dracula. He argues that the entire reason they married was because he was saving her from Dracula, reminding her that Dracula killed her brothers. Shiklah shrugs it off, and tells Deadpool that he would have done the same if he knew them. She then attacks him, telling him that he cannot tell her who she can impetuously marry. After one last tryst and talk with Deadpool, Shiklah emerges and tells Dracula to let their subjects rule themselves, stating that she does not want to rule by force. Dracula eventually relents, stating that he was retired anyway before Deadpool dragged him into this fight. He leaves with Shiklah, who wants to see more of the world. Shiklah wrote Deadpool a note, stating she was off for some stake-play with Dracula.

Dracula returns to his castle in Romania without Shiklah, and begins summoning all vampires in the world to him, including Jubilee. Old Man Logan tracks Jubilee to Dracula's castle, where it is revealed that she is under the vampire's control. Dracula bites Old Man Logan, but his healing factor is able to resist vampirism. Jubilee eventually breaks free from Dracula's influence, allowing Old Man Logan to decapitate Dracula. Dracula's head is given to a Sentinel, who throws it into the Sun.

In the "Blood Hunt" storyline, Dracula assists the Avengers in fighting the vampires led by a Varnae-possessed Blade, who have used a spell to cause all Darkforce users to emit enough Darkforce to blanket Earth. During this time, he encountered his clone Bloodstorm One in a new body when the Bloodcoven fought the Avengers. After Doctor Doom casts a spell to undo the Darkforce, he unintentionally gives Dracula and all vampires the ability to survive in sunlight.

== Powers and abilities ==
Dracula attempting to vampirize Rachel van Helsing, from The Tomb of Dracula (vol. 1) #40 (Jan. 1986). Art by Gene Colan and Tom Palmer.

Dracula gained the powers of a vampire from his transformation into a vampire by the bite of the vampiress Lianda, and gained additional power by Varnae. Dracula possesses far greater powers than most vampires. He is superhumanly strong (to the point of standing toe-to-toe and defeating Colossus in single combat), and also possesses superhuman speed, stamina, reflexes, and transvection. He is immune to aging, conventional disease, sickness and most forms of injury. He cannot be killed or permanently injured by conventional means.

He is unaffected by most assaults and, due to his healing factor, can rapidly regenerate damaged tissue. Dracula can manipulate the minds of others, and command animals, such as rats, bats, and wolves, to his will. With limited exceptions, he may control other vampires. He has the ability to mentally control victims he has bitten, and can temporarily hypnotize anyone with his gaze.

He is capable of shapeshifting into a bat – either normal or human size – or a wolf while retaining his intelligence and into a fog or mist – partially or fully – and has the ability of weather control, such as summoning electrical storms. Like some vampires in other works of fiction, Dracula does not cast a reflection in mirrors and his image cannot be captured on film. His powers have been greatly amplified and his weaknesses circumvented by magical sources, such as the spells of the Darkholders.

Dracula has a dependence on the ingestion of fresh blood to sustain his existence, and an inability to endure direct sunlight. He falls into a comatose state during daylight hours and must spend much time in contact with his native soil. He has vulnerabilities to garlic (which can both repel him and prevent him from changing form), silver and wood (both of which can cause severe pain, the latter to a lesser extent unless it penetrates his heart) and the presence of religious symbols (wielded by one who believes in their spiritual meaning), and can be killed either by beheading or by a wooden stake or blade made of silver driven through his heart. He can also be destroyed by the spell in the Darkhold known as the Montesi Formula (named after Brother Montesi, the late monk who both discovered it and first realized what it was).

Dracula is a skilled hand-to-hand combatant and swordsman with centuries of experience, specializing in 15th-century warfare and militaristic strategy. He has a gifted intellect, and studied under tutors in his youth in Transylvania.

== Reception ==
=== Critical reception ===
Marc Buxton of Den of Geek called Dracula "Marvel’s greatest classic monster," writing, "Somehow, Marvel made Dracula into a classic anti-hero that captured the atmosphere and pathos of Bram Stokers' [sic] novel and the Universal Horror classic. Somehow, Marvel also managed to weave in some super hero craziness as well with Dracula serving as the sometime hero in a book that featured one of the richest supporting casts of any comic of the 1970s. So many characters on our list, Lilith, Blade, and Hannibal King to name but a few, got their starts in Tomb of Dracula. But it was Vlad the Impaler himself that outshined them all with his evil brand of nobility."

=== Accolades ===
- In 2015, Den of Geek ranked Dracula 3rd in their "Marvel’s 31 Best Monsters" list.
- In 2019, Comic Book Resources (CBR) ranked Dracula 1st in their "Top 10 Marvel And DC Vampires" list.
- In 2020, CBR ranked Dracula 10th in their "Dracula: The 5 Best Versions In Comics (& 5 Vampires Even More Terrifying)" list.
- In 2021, Screen Rant included Dracula in their "Marvel: 10 Most Powerful Vampires" list.
- In 2022, CBR ranked Dracula 2nd in their "10 Most Important Marvel Vampires" list, 5th in their "Marvel's 10 Scariest Monsters" list, and 6th in their "Scariest Comic Book Vampires" list.

== Other versions ==
In the mid-1970s, Roy Thomas and Dick Giordano created a serialized adaptation of the original Bram Stoker novel, published in 10- to 12-page installments in the short-lived series Dracula Lives!.

Following the cancellation of Dracula Lives!, an additional installment of their adaptation appeared in Marvel Preview #8 ("The Legion of Monsters"), for a total of 76 pages comprising roughly one-third of the novel. After a 30-year hiatus, Marvel commissioned Thomas and Giordano to finish the adaptation, and ran the reprinted and new material as the four-issue miniseries Stoker's Dracula (Oct. 2004 – May 2005). The entire adaptation was collected by Marvel Illustrated in 2010.

In the Ultimate Marvel universe, Vlad III Dracula is the brother of the vampire known as Morbius the Living Vampire and a direct ancestor of Doctor Doom.

In Mutant X, Dracula succeeded in transforming Storm into a vampire. After Dracula's defeat, he was imprisoned in the Vault, contained in a coffin. The Marauders broke Dracula free. Dracula went on a killing spree, until being killed by Storm.

== In other media ==
=== Television ===
- Dracula appears in the Spider-Woman episode "Dracula's Revenge".
- Dracula appears in the Spider-Man and His Amazing Friends episode "The Transylvania Connection", voiced by Stan Jones.
- Dracula appears in The Super Hero Squad Show episode "This Man-Thing, This Monster! (Six Against Infinity, Part 3)", voiced by Dave Boat.
- Dracula appears in Avengers Assemble, voiced by Corey Burton. This version previously worked with the Allies during World War II to prevent Hydra from invading Transylvania. In the present, he joins the Red Skull's Cabal until the latter betrays them.
- Dracula appears in the Ultimate Spider-Man episode "Blade and the Howling Commandos", voiced again by Corey Burton.
- Dracula appears in the Hulk and the Agents of S.M.A.S.H. episode "Days of Future Smash Part 3: Dracula", voiced again by Corey Burton.

=== Film ===
- Dracula appears in Dracula: Sovereign of the Damned, voiced by Kenji Utsumi in Japanese and Tom Wyner in English.
- Dracula appears in Blade: Trinity, primarily portrayed by Dominic Purcell, and in his "Beast" form by Brian Steele. He also takes the forms of Dr. Edgar Vance (John Michael Higgins), Abraham Whistler (Kris Kristofferson), and Blade (Wesley Snipes). This version is the original progenitor of Hominus nocturna and has gone by many names, currently assuming the name Drake. Furthermore, he possesses immunity to sunlight and a malleable bone structure that gives him limited shapeshifting abilities, being able to assume the appearance of others so long as they are of similar size and shape to him and transform into a demonic form called "the Beast". After spending three centuries in self-imposed exile, Drake is brought back by modern vampires led by Danica Talos in the hope that he will allow them to eliminate their weakness to sunlight. However, Blade and Abigail Whistler kill Drake with a "plague arrow" that releases an airborne contagion capable of destroying all vampires. Out of respect for Blade's victory over him, Drake transforms into a duplicate of the former before he dies so Blade can escape a police manhunt. In an extended ending, Drake survives and attacks the police.

=== Video games ===
- Dracula appears as an unlockable playable character in Marvel Super Hero Squad Online, voiced again by Dave Boat.
- Dracula appears as a group boss in Marvel Avengers Alliance.
- Dracula appears as an unlockable playable character in Marvel Avengers Academy.
- Dracula appears in Marvel Rivals.
