= List of Marvel Comics characters: X =

== X ==
X, also known as The Thing that Lived and X the Unknowable, is a Marvel Comics character. X first appeared in Tales to Astonish #20 - What Was 'X' The Thing That Lived (1961). It was created by Stan Lee, Jack Kirby, and Dick Ayers.

X is a tulpa that writer Charles Bentley created via an old typewriter. X had the power to manipulate reality and change shapes. X destroys everything around Bentley until Bentley destroys the typewriter that created it.

X is later found on Monster Isle by Phil Coulson, Adam Warlock, and the Infinity Watch in 1992's Warlock and the Infinity Watch #7. X became an ally of Mole Man, fighting with him against the Fantastic Four.

== X (Antibody) ==
X is a character in Marvel Comics. X had its first appearance in 2011 in New Mutants #22 - Age of X Chapter Two and was created by Mike Carey, Steve Kurth, and Allen Martinez. X is a psychic antibody of the mutant David Xavier, also known as Legion.

== Xarus ==
Xarus

Publication information
- Publisher: Marvel Comics
- First appearance: Mystic #17 (November 1952)
- Created by: Vic Carrabotta

In-story information
- Species: Vampire
- Place of origin: Earth
- Notable aliases: Shadow General

Xarus is a character appearing in American comic books published by Marvel Comics. He was created by Vic Carrabotta and first appeared in Mystic #17 (November 1952).

Xarus is the son of Dracula. Dissatisfied with Dracula's leadership, Xarus formed a secret alliance with the leaders of various vampire sects to overthrow his father. Their coup was successful and Xarus and his allies beheaded Dracula.

His allies in Mystikos developed devices that neutralize the harmful light frequencies to which vampires are vulnerable. Xarus saw an opportunity to use these devices to establish a stronger, more dominant position for vampires in the world. He distributed them to his allies, who launched a raid on Krieger Sect's fortress, eliminating their senior leadership. Xarus instructed the Claw Sect to hold off on declaring loyalty to him, allowing them to remain neutral and open to potential traitors seeking an alliance. After the Siren Sect's attempted betrayal, Xarus spared their leader, Alyssa, allowing her to live and continue serving him. However, Alyssa betrayed him again by giving Janus one of the light-deflecting pendants, helping him escape after the Claw Sect had turned on Xarus. Surrounded by a small army of vampires wearing the pendants, Xarus was declared Lord of the Vampires.

== X-Cutioner ==
The X-Cutioner is an alias used by two characters appearing in Marvel Comics.

=== Carl Denti ===
Carl Denti, created by Scott Lobdell and Jason Pearson, first appeared in The Uncanny X-Men Annual #17 (June 1993). A former FBI agent obsessed with stalking mutants who kill humans, he uses an array of both alien and Earthly technology in his quest.

Denti's father was an army officer murdered for following an illegal order, which would later interfere with his crusade against mutants. As an FBI officer, Denti partners with Fred Duncan, a contact of Charles Xavier's and a member of the mutant supporter network known as the Xavier Underground who maintains mutant criminal records and stockpiles the weapons and technology of the X-Men foes. Denti takes the files, weapons, and technology for himself and assumes the name of X-Cutioner, with the proclaimed mission of killing any mutant that has killed other people first. Denti is so "dedicated" to his mission that he will use lethal force to stop anyone obstructing his lethal "justice".

A normal human with specialized training, Carl Denti weapons and technology include alien Z'Nox sensors, Sentinel propulsion units for flight, Shi'ar armor, a personal force field, a teleportation unit and various other weapons.

==== X-Cutioner in other media ====
The Carl Denti incarnation of X-Cutioner appears in X-Men '97, voiced by Lawrence Bayne. This version is a leading member of the Friends of Humanity and the Purifiers.

=== Second version ===
An unidentified version of X-Cutioner, created by Marc Guggenheim and Ardian Syaf, first appeared in X-Men Gold (vol. 2) #2 (April 2017).

== Xemu ==
Xemu

Publication information
- Publisher: Marvel Comics
- First appearance: Strange Tales #103 (December 1962)
- Created by: Stan Lee (writer); Larry Lieber (writer); Jack Kirby (writer); Dick Ayers (illustrator)

In-story information
- Place of origin: Fifth Dimension
- Notable aliases: Zemu

Xemu, formerly known as Zemu, is a character appearing in Marvel Comics. Xemu was created by Stan Lee, Larry Lieber, and Jack Kirby and first appeared in Strange Tales #103 (December 1962).

Xemu is the ruler of the Fifth Dimension. He usurped Phineas as ruler until a group of rebels with help from Human Torch imprisoned him. After breaking out and retaking the Fifth Dimension, Xemu attacked and tried to take over Attilan, home of the Inhumans. He was stopped by the Fantastic Four.

== Xenith ==
Xenith is a character appearing in American comic books by Marvel Comics. She first appeared in Starmasters #1 (October, 1995).

Xenith is the leader of the new Imperial Guard. She is a Strontian and a cousin of Gladiator and Kid Gladiator. She is a criminal who was captured by the Shi'ar Empire prior to leading the Imperial Guard.

== Xilo ==
Xilo

Publication information
- Publisher: Marvel Comics
- First appearance: Planet-Size X-Men #1 (August 2021)
- Created by: Gerry Dugan (writer); Pepe Larraz (artist)

In-story information
- Full name: Unknown
- Species: Human Mutant
- Team affiliations: Great Ring of Arakko; Brotherhood of Arakko
- Notable aliases: Xilora; That-Which-Was-Xilo; Xilo-Who-Was-Stulgid; Stulgid; The First Defender; The First Defender of the Broken Land
- Abilities: Insect collective

Xilo, also known as Xilora, is a character appearing in American comic books published by Marvel Comics. He was created by Gerry Duggan and Pepe Larraz, and first appeared in Planet-Size X-Men #1 (August 2021).

Originating from the ancient Threshold civilization two billion years ago, Xilo was one of two survivors of Threshold's fall, the other being Okkara. During the fall, he was severely injured and lost many of his memories, requiring millions of years to recover. He remained with Okkara and served as its defender, taking many different names over time, until Okkara was attacked by the forces of Amenth and split into Krakoa and Arakko. Xilo, along with the other Okkaran mutants, was voluntarily sealed in Amenth along with Arakko to stop the invasion. For the next several thousand years, Xilo served on the Great Ring of Arakko as its chief historian.

Xilo assists in terraforming Mars when Arakko is relocated there. When Uranos attacks Arakko, Xilo is gravely injured, reduced to 13.5% of his original body mass and losing millennia of memories. Having lost a great deal of his identity, he renames himself That-Which-Was-Xilo to reflect this.

When Genesis returns to Arakko and incites a civil war, That-Which-Was-Xilo sides with Storm. To survive in his weakened state, he partially merges with the Fisher King. During the final battle of the war, That-Which-Was-Xilo leaves the Fisher King's body and takes control of Ora Serrata, declaring the end of the Genesis War.

=== Powers and abilities ===
Xilo is an Omega-level mutant whose body consists of an insect collective that can act as a single being or separate into innumerable tendrils. He is able to merge with other beings, replacing their flesh with himself and manipulating them according to his intention. As a collective, he can replace parts of himself and is functionally immortal, having been alive for at least two billion years.

== X'iv ==
X'iv is a character appearing in American comic books published by Marvel Comics. The character, created by Brian Michael Bendis and David Mack, first appeared in New Avengers #39 (March 2008).

A Skrull trained by Chrell, X'iv is seen during the "Secret Invasion" storyline, impersonating Daredevil and Echo in an unsuccessful bid to infiltrate the New Avengers. He attempts to assassinate Hulkling, who defeats the Skrull.

== Christina Xu ==
Christina Xu is a young girl lives with her family at the F.E.A.S.T. center. When she was attacked by Mister Negative's Inner Demons, she was saved by Spider-Boy.

Christina and Spider-Boy are later captured by Madame Monstrosity, who genetically experiments on Christina and transforms her into a humanoid pigeon. Christina, using her newfound ability to communicate with pigeons, enlists a pigeon to get information to Spider-Man, who rallies the Avengers to rescue Spider-Boy. Christina and Madame Monstrosity's other Humanimals are subsequently restored to their human forms.
