= Varnae =

- Varnae: Lord of the Vampires (on left) as seen in Marvel Comics.

Publication information
- Publisher: Marvel Comics
- First appearance: Bizarre Adventures #33 (December 1982)
- Created by: Steve Perry; Steve Bissette

In-story information
- Species: Vampire
- Notable aliases: Lord of the Vampire; Vampire Prime
- Abilities: Superhuman strength, stamina, durability, speed, agility, and reflexes; Accelerated healing; Hypnotism; Shapeshifting; Telepathy; Immortality

Varnae is a fictional character appearing in American comic books published by Marvel Comics. Created by Steve Perry and Steve Bissette, the character first appeared in Bizarre Adventures #33 (December 1982). Varnae is a villainous vampire who has been an adversary of several of Marvel's supernatural and fantasy-related heroes, and is a major character in Marvel's Dracula mythos. He is named after Dracula's literary predecessor, Varney the Vampire.

== Publication history ==
Varnae first appeared in Bizarre Adventures #33 (December 1982), and was created by Steve Perry and Steve Bissette.

Varnae's involvement with Dracula's origin was a retcon to the original Marvel version of Dracula's origin. According to the origin given in Dracula Lives! #2 & 3, Dracula became the Lord of the Vampires by killing Nimrod, who held the title before him. When revisiting the characters in the black and white magazine Bizarre Adventures, Steve Bissette and John Totleben decided to go further back and create a worthy sire for Dracula, and inserted Varnae into a darker version of the story from Dracula Lives!. Much later, writer Roy Thomas revisited the character of Varnae while writing Conan the Barbarian and Doctor Strange in the early 1990s. Thomas added the history of the character as an Atlantean and a foe of Conan and Red Sonja in the former, and revived the character in modernity in the "Vampiric Verses" storyline in the latter. Varnae's history was further fleshed out by the addition of the battles with Thor (in Marvel Comics Presents) and Aamshed (in the 2005 Tomb of Dracula miniseries).

Varnae appeared as part of the "Vampires" entry in the Official Handbook of the Marvel Universe Deluxe Edition #20.

== Fictional character biography ==
Varnae was a sorcerer in ancient Atlantis who was a member of the cult of the Darkholders. The other Darkholders used the Darkhold tome to transform Varnae into the first vampire. However, Varnae turned on the Darkholders when they tried to use him as a weapon against King Kull. Varnae became the Lord of the Vampires, and would retain that title for millennia. When Atlantis sank beneath the sea, Varnae entered a state of suspended animation, and awoke thousands of years later during the Hyborian Age.

Eventually, Varnae tired of his existence, and set events in motion that would grant him a successor as the Lord of the Vampires. In the 15th century, Varnae manipulated a war between Turac and Vlad Tepes. During a battle with Turac's forces, Vlad is fatally wounded by Apocalypse, but is bitten and transformed into the vampire Dracula by Varnae's servant Lianda, saving his life. Varnae names Nimrod the Lord of the Vampires, then sends Nimrod to attack Dracula, his real choice for the title. Dracula kills Nimrod and his lover Lala, only to be killed alongside the assembled vampires by a mortal priest. Varnae arranges for one of his minions to resurrect Dracula using the blood of a virgin. Varnae places Dracula in a coffin before walking into the dawn to die in the sunlight.

In the modern day, Marie Laveau seeks the blood of a vampire to retain her agelessness. However, the potion requires a vampire's blood, which she is unable to procure, as Doctor Strange had killed all vampires using the Montesi Formula. Laveau attempts to counter the Montesi Formula using the Vampiric Verses, but uses the Darkhold to resurrect Varnae after her efforts fail.

== Powers and abilities ==
Varnae has superhuman strength, stamina, durability, speed, agility, and reflexes. In addition, he also possesses accelerated healing, hypnotism, shapeshifting, telepathy, and immortality.

== Reception ==
- In 2021, Screen Rant included Varnae in their "Marvel: 10 Most Powerful Vampires" list.
- In 2022, CBR.com ranked Varnae 5th in their "10 Most Important Marvel Vampires" list.
