= Chuck Kim =

American soccer player

Personal information
- Positions: Midfielder; winger; forward

Senior career*
Years	Team	Apps	(Gls)
2002	Pittsburgh Riverhounds SC	3	(1)
2003/2004	Alemannia Aachen	0	(0)
2005/2006	Lierse S.K.	0	(0)
2007	California Victory	25	(0)
- * Club domestic league appearances and goals

Chuck Kim (born January 20, 1984) is an American retired soccer player.

== Career ==
At the age of 18, during his senior year at Beverly Hills High School, Kim left to play for Pittsburgh Riverhounds SC in the American second division.

After that, he played for Alemannia Aachen in the German Bundesliga II and Lierse S.K. in the Belgian top flight.

Later, Kim joined the American second division again, playing for California Victory.
