= Saint (comics) =

Saint, in comics, may refer to:

- Saint (manhua), a Chinese comic from Hong Kong manhua artist Khoo Fuk Lung
- Saint, a Marvel Comics character who has appeared in a number of horror comics. They are Quincy Harker's dog.
- The Saint, Avon Comics published 12 issues of The Saint comic book between 1947 and 1952 (some of these stories were reprinted in the 1980s)

It may also refer to:

- Saint Germaine (comics), a comic book from Caliber Comics
- Saint of Killers, a character and eponymous mini-series from Preacher, which was published by Vertigo
- Saint Sinner (comics), a Marvel Comics horror title

== See also ==
- Saint (disambiguation)
