= Gene Colan =

American comic artist (1926–2011)

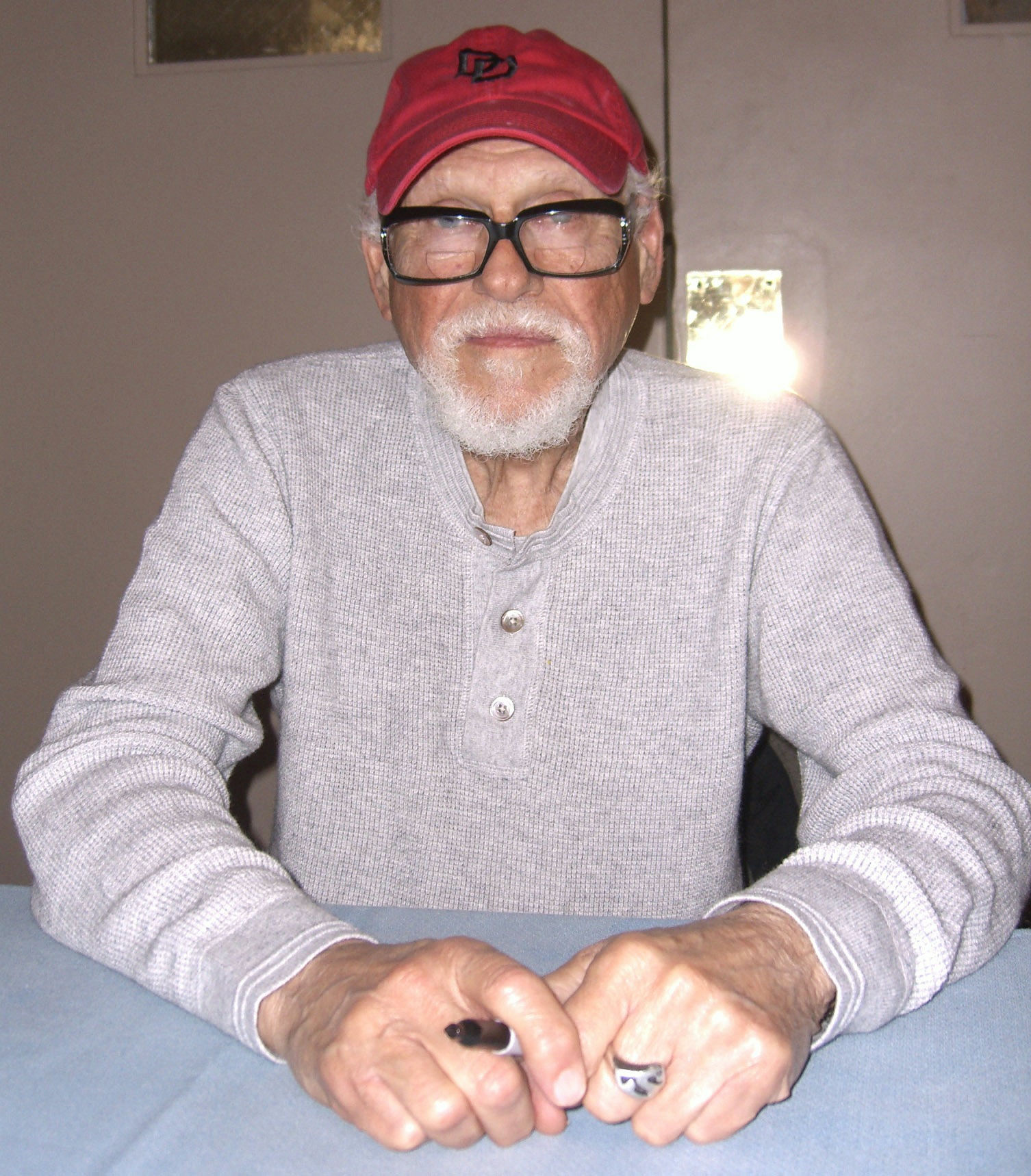
- Colan at the Big Apple Summer Sizzler in Manhattan, June 13, 2009
- Born: Eugene Jules Colan; September 1, 1926 The Bronx, New York, U.S.
- Died: June 23, 2011 (aged 84) The Bronx, New York
- Areas: Penciller, Inker
- Pseudonym: Adam Austin
- Notable works: Daredevil; Detective Comics; Batman; Doctor Strange; Howard the Duck; The Tomb of Dracula
- Awards: Eagle Award, 1977, 1979; Eisner Award, 2010
- Spouses: Sallee Greenberg (divorced); Adrienne Colan (Brickman)

Eugene Jules Colan (/ˈkoʊlən/; September 1, 1926 – June 23, 2011) was an American comic book artist best known for his work for Marvel Comics, where his signature titles include the superhero series Daredevil, the cult-hit satiric series Howard the Duck, and The Tomb of Dracula, considered one of comics' classic horror series. He co-created the Falcon, the first African-American superhero in mainstream comics; Carol Danvers, who would become Ms. Marvel and Captain Marvel; and the non-costumed, supernatural vampire hunter Blade.

Colan was inducted into the Will Eisner Comic Book Hall of Fame in 2005.

== Early life ==
Eugene Jules Colan was born September 1, 1926, to Harold Colan, an insurance salesman, and Winifred Levy Colan, an antique dealer, in The Bronx, New York City. His parents ran an antiques business on the Upper East Side. His family was Jewish, and the family's surname had originally been "Cohen". Colan began drawing at age three. "The first thing I ever drew was a lion. I must've absolutely copied it or something. But that's what my folks tell me. And from then on, I just drew everything in sight. My grandfather was my favorite subject". Among his earliest influences, he said in 2001, were the Coulton Waugh adventure comic strip Dickie Dare "in The New York Sun. I was influenced by the style, or the story. Mostly the story. I took it very seriously." He moved with his family "at about age 4" to Long Beach, New York, on Long Island. Later, he would try to copy artist Norman Rockwell's covers to The Saturday Evening Post. Other major art influences were comics artists Syd Shores and Milton Caniff. Colan attended George Washington High School in the Washington Heights section of Manhattan, and went on to study at the Art Students League of New York.

== Career ==
=== Early career ===
Daredevil #48 (Jan. 1969). Gene Colan (penciler) and George Klein (inker) slip an in-joke into this Times Square scene. Whatever caused the apparent frustration, note the word at Daredevil's left hand.

Colan began working in comics in 1944, doing illustrations for publisher Fiction House's aviation-adventure series Wings Comics. "[J]ust a summertime job before I went into the service", it gave Colan his first published work, the one-page "Wing Tips" non-fiction filler "P-51B Mustang" (issue #52, Dec. 1944). His first comics story was a seven-page "Clipper Kirk" feature in the following month's issue.

After attempting to enlist in the U.S. Marine Corps during World War II but being pulled out by his father "because I was underage", Colan at "18 or 19" enlisted in the Army Air Corps. Originally scheduled for gunnery school in Boulder, Colorado, plans changed with the war's sudden end. "I was going to be an aerial gunner. A bomber. But it never materialized", he recalled in 2001. After training at an Army camp near Biloxi, Mississippi, he joined the U.S. forces in the Philippines. There Colan rose to the rank of corporal, drew for the Manila Times, and won an art contest.

Upon his return to civilian life in 1946, Colan went to work for Marvel Comics' 1940s precursor, Timely Comics. He recalled in 2000,

I was living with my parents. I worked very hard on a war story, about seven or eight pages long, and I did all the lettering myself, I inked it myself, I even had a wash effect over it. I did everything I could do, and I brought it over to Timely. What you had to do in those days was go to the candy store, pick up a comic book, and look in the back to see where it was published. Most of them were published in Manhattan, they would tell you the address, and you'd simply go down and make an appointment to go down and see the art director. Al Sulman, listed in Timely mastheads then as an "editorial associate", "gave me my break. I went up there, and he came out and met me in the waiting room, looked at my work, and said, 'Sit here for a minute'. And he brought the work in, and disappeared for about 10 minutes or so ... then came back out and said, 'Come with me'. That's how I met [editor-in-chief] Stan [Lee]. Just like that, and I had a job.

Comics historian Michael J. Vassallo identifies that first story as "Adam and Eve — Crime Incorporated" in Lawbreakers Always Lose #1 (cover date Spring 1948), on which is written the internal job number 2401. He notes another story, "The Cop They Couldn't Stop" in All-True Crime #27 (April 1948), job number 2505, may have been published first, citing the differing cover-date nomenclature ("Spring" v. "April") for the uncertainty.

Hired as "a staff penciler", Colan "started out at about $60 a week. ... Syd Shores was the art director". Due to Colan's work going uncredited, in the manner of the times, comprehensive credits for this era are difficult if not impossible to ascertain. In 2010, he recalled his first cover art being for an issue of Captain America Comics; Colan drew the 12-page lead story in issue #72, the cover-artist of which is undetermined. He definitively drew the cover of the final issue, the horror comic Captain America's Weird Tales #75 (Feb. 1950), which did not include the titular superhero on either the cover or inside.

After virtually all the Timely staff was let go in 1948 during an industry downturn, Colan began freelancing for National Comics, the future DC Comics. A stickler for accuracy, he meticulously researched his countless war stories for DC's All-American Men at War, Captain Storm, and Our Army at War, as well as for Marvel's 1950s forerunner Atlas Comics, on the series Battle, Battle Action, Battle Ground, Battlefront, G.I. Tales, Marines in Battle, Navy Combat and Navy Tales. Colan's earliest confirmed credit during this time is penciling and inking the six-page crime fiction story "Dream Of Doom", by an uncredited writer, in Atlas' Lawbreakers Always Lose #6 (Feb. 1949).

By the early 1950s, he was living in New Rochelle, New York. Around this time he did his first work for DC Comics, then the industry leader, on the licensed series Hopalong Cassidy, based on the film and TV Western hero, drawing it from 1954 to 1957. In the 1960s, he lived in New Jersey, where his and Adrienne's children, Erik and Nanci, were raised.

Dr. Strange #180 (May 1969). Cover art by Colan and inker Tom Palmer, utilizing photomontage.

=== Silver Age ===
While freelancing for DC romance comics in the 1960s, Colan did his first superhero work for Marvel under the pseudonym Adam Austin. Taking to the form immediately, he introduced the "Sub-Mariner" feature in Tales to Astonish, and succeeded Don Heck on "Iron Man" in Tales of Suspense.

Sometime after Colan began this pseudonymous stint, Marvel editor Stan Lee made overtures to lure him from DC. Colan recalled,

Stan asked me to come over and work with him. I don't remember how, but I do know that we made a connection, and he asked me, "How about coming over?" And so, my answer was — I think this was at his house; I had some work to deliver late one night; it was in the wintertime, and I went over and delivered it — and he asked me to come over to Marvel, and I said, "Well, what's the inducement? Why should I leave DC and come over to work with you, unless there's a little something in it for me to do that? I'm not just going to leave them [DC]." He said, "Well, if you're looking for more money, there's no point to it." I said, "What do you mean?" [laughs] He said, "Simply because, sooner or later, they're going to have to fire you, and you'll have to come over here." [laughs] I smiled, and I said, "Stan, I think I have to go." And I shook his hand, and I said, "That's okay, I'll just stay where I am." The next day, I got a phone call from Stan, because I had asked for more money, and he gave it to me. He tried to bluff me, and ... then I came over.

Under his own name, Colan became one of the premier Silver Age Marvel artists, illustrating a host of such major characters as Captain America, Doctor Strange (both in the late-1960s and the mid-1970s series), and his signature character, Daredevil. Operating, like other company artists, on the "Marvel Method" — in which editor-in-chief and primary writer Stan Lee "would just speak to me for a few minutes on the phone, tell me the beginning, the middle and the end [of a story] and not much else, maybe four or five paragraphs, and then he'd tell me to make [a 20-page] story out of it," providing artwork to which Lee would then script dialogue and captions — Colan forged his own style, different from that of artists Jack Kirby and Steve Ditko, whom Lee would point to as examples of the Marvel style:

Whatever book he thought was selling, he would have the rest of the staff try to copy the same style of work, but I wouldn't do it. I'd tell him if you want Stevie Ditko then you'll have to get Stevie Ditko. I can't do it, I have to be myself. So he left me alone. ... He knew I meant it and that I couldn't do it and there was no point in trying to force me to do it. Stan recognized something in my work from the very start, whatever that was, that gave [me] my first big break. And I always got along very well with Stan; not everybody can say that but I did ... so he let me do pretty much what I wanted to do ... [T]here was always some little change here and there, but basically he left me alone. ... And I was intimidated by Stan. I didn't want to go into his office, it upset me a little bit, but he was very nice to me. He left me pretty much alone because I was able to deliver pretty much what he was looking for, so we never had any trouble.

Lee and Colan introduced the Emissaries of Evil in Daredevil Annual #1 (1967) and the Jester in Daredevil #42 (July 1968). Colan's long run on the Daredevil series encompassed all but three issues in an otherwise unbroken, 81-issue string from #20-100 (Sept. 1966 - June 1973), plus the initial Daredevil Annual (1967). He returned to draw ten issues sprinkled from 1974 to 1979, and an eight-issue run in 1997. Colan admitted relying upon amphetamines in order to make deadlines for illustrating the series Doctor Strange, for which he would personally visit the character's real-life Manhattan neighborhood, Greenwich Village, and shoot Polaroid photographs to use as location reference. Captain Marvel, a character created to secure the trademark on the name, debuted in Marvel Super-Heroes #12 (Dec. 1967) by Lee and Colan. The original Guardians of the Galaxy first appeared in Marvel Super-Heroes #18 (Jan. 1969) by writer Arnold Drake and Colan.

In Captain America #117 (Sept. 1969), Colan and writer-editor Stan Lee created the Falcon, the first African-American superhero in mainstream comic books. The character came about, Colan recalled in 2008,

... in the late 1960s [when news of the] Vietnam War and civil rights protests were regular occurrences, and Stan, always wanting to be at the forefront of things, started bringing these headlines into the comics. ... One of the biggest steps we took in this direction came in Captain America. I enjoyed drawing people of every kind. I drew as many different types of people as I could into the scenes I illustrated, and I loved drawing black people. I always found their features interesting and so much of their strength, spirit and wisdom written on their faces. I approached Stan, as I remember, with the idea of introducing an African-American hero and he took to it right away. ... I looked at several African-American magazines, and used them as the basis of inspiration for bringing The Falcon to life.

Concurrent with his move to Marvel, Colan also contributed several stories to Warren Publishing's line of black-and-white horror comics magazines, beginning with the six-page tale "To Pay the Piper", by writer Larry Ivie, in Eerie #2 (March 1966). There and in subsequent stories for that magazine and its sister publication, Creepy, Colan would ink his own pencil work. His final original Warren story, "First Blood", appeared in Eerie #11 (Sept. 1967). The vast majority of these were written by Warren editor Archie Goodwin, with whom Colan would later collaborate on Marvel's Iron Man.

=== Dracula and Batman ===
Colan in the 1970s illustrated the complete 70-issue run of the acclaimed horror title The Tomb of Dracula as well as most issues of writer Steve Gerber's cult hit Howard the Duck.

Colan, already one of Marvel's most well-established and prominent artists, said he had lobbied for the Tomb of Dracula assignment:

When I heard Marvel was putting out a Dracula book, I confronted [editor] Stan [Lee] about it and asked him to let me do it. He didn't give me too much trouble but, as it turned out, he took that promise away, saying he had promised it to Bill Everett. Well, right then and there I auditioned for it. Stan didn't know what I was up to, but I spent a day at home and worked up a sample, using Jack Palance as my inspiration and sent it to Stan. I got a call that very day: 'It's yours.'

Colan and Marv Wolfman created several supporting characters for the Dracula series. They introduced Blade in The Tomb of Dracula #10 (July 1973) and Lilith in Giant-Size Chillers #1 (June 1974). Colan became the artist of Doctor Strange volume 2 with issue #6 (Feb. 1975) which introduced the Gaea character. A crossover between the two Colan-drawn series occurred in May 1976. In 2010, Comics Bulletin ranked Colan's run on The Tomb of Dracula fifth on its list of the "Top 10 1970s Marvels". His work on Doctor Strange was ranked ninth on the same list. Colan's collaboration with Steve Gerber on the Howard the Duck series saw the title character nominated by the All-Night Party, a fictional political party, as their nominee in the Presidential campaign of 1976, and led to Howard the Duck receiving thousands of write-in votes in the actual election. The Gerber-Colan team created Doctor Bong in Howard the Duck #15 (Aug. 1977). Gerber later said to Colan: "There really was almost a telepathic connection there. I would see something in my mind, and that is what you would draw! I've never had that experience with another artist before or since."

Colan returned to DC in 1981, following a professional falling out with Marvel editor-in-chief Jim Shooter. Colan recalled two decades later that Shooter

... hated me. I was miserable. It was the worst experience ... one of the worst I've ever experienced. I had to leave Marvel because of him. I wouldn't stay, and I ... left everything behind. I left a pension plan, everything. I would have stayed, but Shooter gave me such a rough time. In fact, the vice president [of Marvel] had been down in a meeting with me and Shooter, trying to pacify me and get me to stay. And I just wouldn't do it, cause I could see the writing on the wall, and I knew where Shooter was heading, and I didn't want any more of it.

He brought his shadowy, moody textures to Batman, serving as the character's primary artist from 1981 to 1986, penciling most issues of Detective Comics and Batman during this time. His debut issue of the character's eponymous series was #340 (Oct. 1981). With writer Gerry Conway, Colan revived the Golden Age supervillains Doctor Death in Batman #345 (March 1982) and the Monk in Batman #350 (Aug. 1982) and introduced Killer Croc in Detective Comics #523 (Feb. 1983). Killer Croc appears in the 2016 live-action movie Suicide Squad, portrayed by Adewale Akinnuoye-Agbaje. Another new character, Nightslayer, was created by Colan and Doug Moench in Detective Comics #529 (Aug. 1983).

In the insert preview in DC Comics Presents #41 (Jan. 1982), writer Roy Thomas and Colan provided Wonder Woman with a stylized "WW" emblem on her bodice, replacing the traditional eagle. The "WW" emblem, unlike the eagle, could be protected as a trademark and therefore had greater merchandising potential. Wonder Woman #288 (February 1982) premiered the new costume and an altered cover banner incorporating the "WW" emblem. Colan was one of several artists on Wonder Woman #300 (Feb. 1983) and stayed on the series until issue #305 wherein he and writer Dan Mishkin reintroduced the character Circe to the rogues gallery of Wonder Woman's adversaries. Steve Gerber and Colan reunited at DC to produce The Phantom Zone limited series. Helping to create new characters as well, Colan collaborated in the 1980s with The Tomb of Dracula writer Marv Wolfman on the 14-issue run of Night Force featuring characters introduced in an insert preview in The New Teen Titans #21 (July 1982). He was one of the contributors to the DC Challenge limited series in 1985. Additionally, Colan worked with Cary Bates on the 12-issue run of Silverblade; with Greg Potter on the 12-issue run of Jemm, Son of Saturn; and drew the first six issues of Doug Moench's 1987 revival of The Spectre.

Colan page from The Tomb of Dracula #40 (Jan. 1976). Inked by Tom Palmer.

Colan's style, characterized by fluid figure drawing and extensive use of shadow, was unusual among Silver Age comic artists, and became more pronounced as his career progressed. He usually worked as a penciller, with Frank Giacoia and Tom Palmer as his most frequent inkers. Colan broke from the mass-market comic book penciller/inker/colorist assembly-line system by creating finished drawings in graphite and watercolor on such projects as the DC Comics miniseries Nathaniel Dusk (1984) and Nathaniel Dusk II (1985–86), and the feature "Ragamuffins" in the Eclipse Comics umbrella series Eclipse #3, 5, and 8 (1981–83), with frequent collaborator Don McGregor.

Independent-comics work includes the Eclipse graphic novel Detectives Inc.: A Terror Of Dying Dreams (1985), written by McGregor and reprinted in sepia tone as an Eclipse miniseries in 1987, and the miniseries Predator: Hell & Hot Water for Dark Horse Comics. He contributed to Archie Comics in the late 1980s and early 1990s, drawing and occasionally writing a number of stories. His work there included penciling the lighthearted science-fiction series Jughead's Time Police #1-6 (July 1990–May 1991), and the 1990 one-shot To Riverdale and Back Again, an adaptation of the NBC TV movie about the Archie characters 20 years later, airing May 6, 1990; Stan Goldberg drew the parts featuring the characters in flashback as teens, while Colan drew adult characters, in a less cartoony style, and Mike Esposito inking both.

Back at Marvel, he collaborated again with Marv Wolfman and veteran inker Al Williamson on a new The Tomb of Dracula series, and with Don McGregor on a Black Panther serial in the Marvel Comics Presents anthology, as well as a six-issue adaptation of Clive Barker's "The Harrowers: Raiders of the Abyss."

=== Later life and career ===
Colan did some insert artwork on Hellbilly Deluxe (released August 1998), the first solo album of Rob Zombie, credited as Gene "The Mean Machine" Colan. Unrealized projects around this time included the Marvel Music comic Elvis: Mystery Train, which went on hold, he said in 1996, "when Marvel ran into problems, so everything came to a halt. Right now it's in limbo. Senator Daniel Patrick Moynihan's son is writing it ..."

In 1998, Colan and his Tomb of Dracula writing collaborator, Marv Wolfman, reteamed on Dark Horse Comics three-issue miniseries The Curse of Dracula (July-Sept. 1998). Saying the book required "a much younger and better-looking Dracula" than in their previous series, Colan used "my lawn-boy [as] my model. ... I asked him to do the posing and he did." For the same company early the next decade, Colan returned to vampires with the 2001 one-shot Buffy the Vampire Slayer: Tales of the Slayers, an omnibus that included writer Doug Petrie's 16-page "Nikki Goes Down", starring a 1970s vampire slayer seen in one episode of the namesake TV series.

Colan penciled the final pages of Blade vol. 3, #12 (Oct. 2007), the final issue of that series, drawing a flashback scene in which the character dresses in his original outfit from the 1970s series The Tomb of Dracula. That same month, for the anniversary issue Daredevil vol. 2, #100 (Oct. 2007), Colan penciled pages 18–20 of the 36-page story "Without Fear, Part One"; the issue additionally reprinted the Colan-drawn Daredevil #90-91 (Aug.-Sept. 1972).

In the late 1980s, Colan, in addition to his art, taught at Manhattan's School of Visual Arts and Fashion Institute of Technology, and had showings at the Bess Cutler Gallery in New York City and at the Elm Street Arts Gallery in Manchester, Vermont. He had relocated to nearby Manchester Center, Vermont, from New York City in 1990 or 1991, and was living there as of 2001. By 2009 at the latest, they had returned to New York City, settling in Brooklyn.

On May 11, 2008, his family announced that Colan, who had been hospitalized for liver failure, had suffered a sharp deterioration in his health. By December, he had sufficiently recovered to travel to an in-store signing in California. He continued to produce original comics work as late as 2009, drawing the 40-page Captain America #601 (Sept. 2009), for which he won an Eisner Award.

== Personal life ==
Gene Colan was married twice: first to Sallee Greenberg, with whom he had children Valerie and Jill before the couple divorced, and Adrienne Brickman, with whom he had children Erik and Nanci. Adrienne Colan died on June 21, 2010.

Colan died in the Bronx on June 23, 2011, aged 84, following complications of cancer and liver disease. He lived in Brooklyn at the time of his death.

== Awards and honors ==
Colan's collaboration with Steve Gerber on Howard the Duck received the 1977 and 1978 Eagle Award for Favorite Comic Book (Humor) and was nominated for four Eagle Awards in 1978. Colan received an Inkpot Award in 1978 as well.

In 2005, Colan was inducted into the comics industry's Will Eisner Comic Book Hall of Fame. He subsequently won the 2010 Eisner Award for Best Single Issue (together with writer Ed Brubaker) for his work on Captain America #601 (Sept. 2009).

The Cartoon Art Museum in San Francisco presented the retrospective "Colan: Visions of a Man without Fear" from November 15, 2008, to March 15, 2009.

Colan was the recipient of the 2008 Sparky Award, presented December 4, 2008 and won the Comic Art Professional Society's Sergio Award on October 24, 2009.

== Bibliography ==
=== Archie Comics ===
- Archie's Pals 'n' Gals #186, #188, #197 (1987-88)
- Everything's Archie #133, #142, 148 (1988–90)
- Jughead #17 (1990)
- Jughead's Pal Hot Dog #3 (1990)
- Jughead's Time Police #3–6 (1990–91)
- Life with Archie #272–279, #285–286 (also writer for #273, #278) (1989–1991)
- Pep Comics #411 (1987)
- Teenage Mutant Ninja Turtles Adventures #22 (1991)
- To Riverdale and Back Again oneshot (1990)

=== Bongo Comics ===
- Treehouse of Horror #11 (2005)

=== Comico ===
- Bloodscent #1 (1988)

=== CrossGen Comics ===
- Rob Zombie's Spookshow International #1–3 (2003–2004)

=== Dark Horse Comics ===
- Buffy the Vampire Slayer: Tales of the Slayers OGN (2002)
- Creepy: The Limited Series #1 (1992)
- The Curse of Dracula #1–3 (1998)
- Dark Horse Presents #117 (Aliens) (1997)
- Harlan Ellison's Dream Corridor #2 (2007)
- Hellboy: Weird Tales #6 (2003)
- Michael Chabon Presents The Amazing Adventures of the Escapist #2, 5 (2004–2005)
- Predator: Hell & Hot Water #1–3 (1997)

=== DC Comics ===
- All-American Men of War #3–4, 6–9, 43, 112–113 (1953–1966)
- Batman #340, 343–345, 348–351, 373, 383 (1981–1985)
- Batman: Gotham Knights (Batman Black and White) #15 (2001)
- Captain Storm #4, 13, 16 (1964–1966)
- DC Challenge #1 (1985)
- DC Comics Presents #41 (Wonder Woman preview) (1982)
- DC Science Fiction Graphic Novel #2 (Nightwings) (1986)
- Detective Comics #510, 512, 517, 523, 528–538, 540–546, 555–567 (1982–1986)
- Elvira's House of Mystery #11 (1987)
- Falling in Love #68, 73, 75, 81, 84, 87 (1964-1966)
- Fury of Firestorm #19, Annual #4 (1984–1986)
- G.I. Combat #113 (1965)
- Girls' Love Stories #113, 115, 118, 145, 165, 167, 174 (1965-1972)
- Girls' Romances #101, 103, 106-109, 111-115, 117-119, 123 (1964-1967)
- Heart Throbs #87, 89, 91, 97-98, 100, 106-107 (1963-1967)
- Hopalong Cassidy #86-122 (1954-1957)
- House of Secrets #63 (1963)
- Jemm, Son of Saturn #1-12 (limited series) (1984–1985)
- Just Imagine Stan Lee With Jim Lee Creating Wonder Woman (backup story) (2001)
- Legion of Super-Heroes vol. 2 #311 (1984)
- Legion of Super-Heroes vol. 3 #27 (1986)
- Little Shop of Horrors movie adaptation #1 (1987)
- My Greatest Adventure #72-75, 77 (1962-1963)
- Mystery in Space #13, 26 (1953-1955)
- Nathaniel Dusk #1–4 (1984)
- Nathaniel Dusk II #1–4 (1985–1986)
- The New Teen Titans #21 (Night Force preview) (1982)
- Night Force #1–14 (1982–1983)
- Our Army at War #5-19, 144, 162, 169, 173 (1952-1966)
- Our Fighting Forces #86-87, 95, 100 (1964-1966)
- Phantom Zone #1–4 (1982)
- Sea Devils #13 (1963)
- Secret Hearts #92, 94, 96-107, 109-114 (1963-1966)
- Secret Origins #5 (Crimson Avenger) (1986)
- Silverblade #1–12 (1987–1988)
- Spectre vol. 2 #1–6 (1987)
- Star Spangled War Stories #17-18, 20, 121, 123, 128 (1954-1966)
- Strange Adventures #30 (1953)
- Western Comics #62 (1957)
- Who's Who: The Definitive Directory of the DC Universe #2, 11, 16–17, 25 (1985–1987)
- Wonder Woman #288–305 (1982–1983)
- World's Finest Comics #274 (Zatanna); #297, 299 (Superman and Batman) (1981–1984)
- Young Love #52, 56, 61, 65-66 (1965-1968)
- Young Romance #128, 131, 133 (1964)

=== Disney Comics ===
- Goofy Adventures #17 (1991)

=== Eclipse Comics ===
- Detectives Inc.: A Terror of Dying Dreams OGN (1985)
- Eclipse Monthly #3–4 (1983–1984)
- Eclipse Magazine #3, 5, 8 (Ragamuffins) (1981–1983)
- Stewart the Rat graphic novel (1980)

=== IDW Comics ===
- Hero Comics oneshot (also writer) (2009)

=== Marvel Comics ===
- 2-Gun Western #4 (1956)
- 2099 Unlimited #9 (1995)
- 3-D Tales of the West #1 (1954)
- Adventure into Mystery #7 (1957)
- Adventures into Terror #3, 5, 14, 21, 24–25, 28–29 (1951–1954)
- All-True Crime #46 (1951)
- All-True Crime Cases #27, 31, 33–34 (1948–1949)
- Amazing Adventures #3–5 (Black Widow); #26 (Killraven) (1970–1974)
- Amazing Detective Cases #9 (1951)
- Amazing Mysteries #32–33 (1949)
- Astonishing #12, 20, 29, 56 (1952–1956)
- Astonishing Tales #7–8 (Doctor Doom) (1971)
- The Avengers #63–65, 206–208, 210–211 (1969–1981)
- Battle #11, 16-17, 19, 24, 33–35, 38, 41, 43, 47–56, 58-59 (1952–1958)
- Battle Action #8, 15, 19, 21–22, 24–25, 28–30 (1953–1957)
- Battle Ground #3, 11–13, 16-20 (1955–1957)
- Battlefield #5, 11 (1952–1953)
- Battlefront #21–22, 24–25, 27, 3–-35, 38–40, 42–43, 45–48 (1954–1957)
- Best Love #36 (1950)
- Bible Tales for Young People #4 (1954)
- Black Rider #11 (1950)
- Blade: Crescent City Blues #1 (1998)
- Blade vol. 4 #12 (two pages) (2007)
- Bob Marley: Tale of the Tuff Gong #1–2 (1994–1995)
- Captain America #116–137, 256, 601, Annual #5 (1969–1971, 1981, 2009)
- Captain America’s Weird Tales #75 (1950)
- Captain Marvel #1–4 (1968)
- Combat #5, 11 (1952–1953)
- Combat Kelly #3 (1952)
- Commando Adventures #1–2 (1957)
- Complete Mystery #1 (1948)
- Crime Can't Win #1 (1950)
- Crimefighters #1–2 (1948)
- Daredevil #20–49, 53–82, 84–98, 100, 110, 112, 116, 124, 153–154, 156–157, 363, 366–368, 370, #-1, Annual #1 (1966–1979, 1997)
- Daredevil vol. 2 #20 (2001)
- Doctor Strange #172–178, 180–183 (1968–1969)
- Doctor Strange, vol. 2, #6–18, 36–45, 47 (1975–1981)
- Doctor Strange, Sorcerer Supreme #19 (1990)
- Dracula Lives #6, 8 (1973–1974)
- Frontier Western #1–2, 6 (1956)
- G.I. Tales #5–6 (1957)
- Giant-Size Chillers #1 (Dracula) (1974)
- Girl Comics #4 (1950)
- Gunhawk #16, 18 (1951)
- Gunsmoke Western #35-39, 42, 72, 76 (1956–1963)
- Harrowers #1–6 (1993–1994)
- Haunt of Horror #2 (1974)
- Howard the Duck #4–20, 24–27, 30–31 (1976–1979)
- Howard the Duck magazine #1–5, 7–9 (1979–1981)
- Hulk! #11, 19, 24–27 (1978–1981)
- Ideal #4 (1948)
- Iron Man #1, 253, Annual #10, 13, 15 (1968, 1989–1994)
- Iron Man and Sub-Mariner #1 (1968)
- Journey into Mystery #2, 23, 40, 81-82 (1952-1962)
- Journey into Mystery vol. 2 #4 (1973)
- Journey Into Unknown Worlds #2, 6, 17, 19-20, 23, 29, 39 (1950–55)
- Justice #4–5, 7, 22, 32, 35–36, 46 (1948–54)
- Kid Colt Outlaw #52, 79, 110, 112, 114 (1955–64)
- Lawbreakers Always Lose #1–2, 6 (1948–49)
- Love Adventures #2 (1950)
- Love Romances #101 (1962)
- Love Tales #62 (1955)
- Loveland #1 (1949)
- Lovers #26 (1949)
- Man Comics #9, 13, 21, 23 (1951-1953)
- Marines at War #5-7 (1957)
- Marines in Action #5-6, 11-12 (1956-1957)
- Marines in Battle #1, 9-10, 17, 19-25 (1954-1958)
- Marvel Comics Presents #13–37, 101–108, 112 (1989-1992)
- Marvel Fanfare #51-52 (1990)
- Marvel Preview #8, 16, 23 (1976-1980)
- Marvel Romance Redux: But I Thought He Loved Me #1 (2006)
- Marvel Romance Redux: Guys & Dolls #1 (2006)
- Marvel Romance Redux: I Should Have Been a Blonde #1 (2006)
- Marvel Romance Redux: Love Is a Four-Letter Word #1 (2006)
- Marvel Spotlight #18-19 (Son of Satan) (1974)
- Marvel Super-Heroes #12–13 (Captain Marvel), 15 (Medusa), 18 (Guardians of the Galaxy) (1967-1969)
- Marvel Super Special #6 (Jaws 2 movie adaptation); 10 (Star-Lord); #14 (Meteor movie adaptation) (1978-1979)
- Marvel Tales #93-94, 96, 101, 105, 107, 118, 120-121, 127, 131, 140 (1949-1955)
- Marvel Team-Up #87 (1979)
- Men's Adventures #13-14, 19, 26 (1952-1954)
- Menace #6 (1953)
- Midnight Sons Unlimited #6 (1994)
- Monsters Unleashed #1 (1973)
- My Love #3 (1950)
- My Love vol. 2 #4-6, 8-9, 13, 15-16 (1970-1972)
- My Own Romance #11, 18, 44 (1950–55)
- Mystery Tales #1, 3, 18, 35, 43 (1952-1956)
- Mystic #3, 7, 12, 21, 37, 60 (1951-1957)
- Navy Action #8, 10-11, 16-18 (1955-1957)
- Navy Combat #4, 6, 11, 13-18 (1955-1958)
- Navy Tales #3-4 (1957)
- Not Brand Echh #4-5, 8-9, 13 (1967-1969)
- Our Love #1 (1949)
- Our Love Story #3-6, 8, 10 (1970-1971)
- Outlaw Fighters #4 (1955)
- Police Action #1 (1954)
- Quick-Trigger Western #13, 16 (1956-1957)
- Rangeland Love #1 (1949)
- Rawhide Kid #35, 37-38 (1963-1964)
- Richie Rich #1 (movie adaptation) (1995)
- Riot #1 (1954)
- Savage Sword of Conan #33 (1978)
- Savage Tales #1 (1971)
- Secret Story Romances #9 (1954)
- Silver Surfer #1–3 (The Watcher backup stories) (1968)
- Six-Gun Western #3 (1957)
- Spellbound #17, 28 (1953-1956)
- Sports Action #3 (1950)
- Spy Cases #1 (1950)
- Strange Stories of Suspense #13 (1957)
- Strange Tales #7-8, 11, 18, 20, 26, 53, 58-59, 97 (1952-1962); #169–173 (Brother Voodoo) (1973-1974)
- Sub-Mariner #10–11, 40, 43, 46-49 (1969-1972)
- Suspense #2-4, 9, 17 (1950-1952)
- Tales of Justice #62 (1956)
- Tales of Suspense #73–99 (1966-1968)
- Tales of the Zombie #2, 6 (1973–1974)
- Tales to Astonish (Sub-Mariner) #70–77, 79–82, 84–85, 101 (1965-1968)
- Teen-Age Romance #85-86 (1962)
- Tex Morgan #4 (1949)
- Thunderbolts Annual '97 (among others) (1997)
- The Tomb of Dracula #1–70 (1972-1979)
- The Tomb of Dracula magazine #3–6 (1979-1980)
- The Tomb of Dracula vol. 3 #1-4 (1991-1992)
- Tower of Shadows #3–4, 6 (1970)
- True Life Tales #1 (1949)
- True Secrets #38 (1956)
- True Western #1 (1949)
- Two-Gun Kid #49 (1959)
- Two-Gun Western #4–5 (1956)
- Uncanny Tales #11, 16-17, 45, 49, 52 (1953-1957)
- Unknown Worlds of Science Fiction #1, 3, 5-6 (1975)
- Venus #12 (1951)
- War Action #14 (1953)
- War Adventures #6-7 (1952)
- War Combat #3 (1952)
- War Comics #1, 4, 28, 31, 34-36, 39, 41, 44-49 (1950-1957)
- Western Gunfighters #20, 25-27 (1956-1957)
- Western Outlaws #5, 10-11, 17, 20 (1954-1957)
- What If (Fantastic Four) #21 (1980)
- Wild #4 (1954)
- Wild West #2 (1948)
- Wild Western #49 (1956)
- Wolverine #9, 24 (1989–1990)
- World of Fantasy #10 (1958)
- World of Mystery #6 (1957)
- Young Hearts #2 (1950)
- Young Men on the Battlefield #14–15, 20 (1952–1953)

=== Ziff-Davis Publishing ===
- Lars of Mars #10–11 (1951)
