= Marvel Mangaverse =

Comic book series

- Cover art for Marvel Mangaverse: New Dawn #1, by Ben Dunn.

Publication information
- Schedule: Varied
- Formats: Varied
- Original language: English
- Genre: Superhero
- Publication date: 2000–2002

The Marvel Mangaverse is a series of comic books published by Marvel Comics from 2000 to 2002, with a sequel, New Mangaverse, released in 2006.

The series is set in an alternate universe to the Marvel universe, where its characters are portrayed in a manga-like style. Four volumes were published, with Volumes 1 and 2 being connected by a story arc featuring multiple Marvel characters and Volumes 3 and 4 having stories focusing on Spider-Man and an alternate version of Jean Grey, respectively.

The 2005 edition of Official Handbook of the Marvel Universe designates Marvel Mangaverse as Earth-2301 in the Marvel multiverse. Most of the artwork for Volume 1 was shared between different artists, each of whom contributed to one issue, with book-ends by Ben Dunn, who also did artwork for Volume 2. The artwork for the miniseries New Mangaverse: The Rings of Fate was done by Tom Hanks.

== Volume 1 ==
The Avengers transform their Iron Avengers into the Ultimate Iron Man robot.

Three years prior to the story's events, Bruce Banner discovered the Negative Zone, a dimension containing vast amounts of energy, and was tricked by the terrorist organization Hydra into building the Energy Well, a means of harvesting the energy to power a weapon of mass destruction. When the weapon was fired, it created a massive EMP that caused a twenty-four hour global blackout, killing thousands. During the crisis, Namor invaded the surface, but was stopped by Iron Man, who disappeared soon after. Tony Stark rescued Banner, who had gone insane, and suppressed his memories using a Cerebral Driver. Various forces conspire to create a second Energy Well, resulting in Dormammu invading Earth, but he is defeated by Thor and the other heroes. Serving Dormammu is a massive, Godzilla-like incarnation of the Hulk who Thor destroys.

Tony Stark later returns, having been reduced to a head, in an advisory role to the Avengers. Iron Man also appears in the form of several large robots that combine into a larger mecha, which he calls Ultimate Ironman. Ultimate Iron Man reappears in Volume 2, where it is destroyed in combat with T'Channa, the sister of Black Panther and the second Doctor Doom.

== Characters ==
- Iron Maiden (Antoinette "Toni" Stark) - A former S.H.I.E.L.D. agent, sister of Tony Stark, and current owner of Stark Industries. Unlike her brother, Toni has made her identity public and opened defense contracts with the U.S. military. She is revealed in the final issue of Volume 1 to be in love with Bruce Banner, and ascends to another plane of existence with him.
- Bruce Banner - A physicist who built the Energy Well, a portal to the Negative Zone, and was possessed by the Hulk after it malfunctioned. He is in love with Toni Stark, which she reciprocates, and, along with her, ascends to another plane of existence at the conclusion.
- Wasp - An employee of Stark Industries and the creator of W.A.S.P. (Winged Amplification Surge Plasma), which allows her to fly.
- Hank Pym - A boy genius and rock star who helped Bruce Banner construct the Energy Well. He can control ants with his guitar.
- Black Panther - The king of Wakanda, and a shaman who uses mystic arts to transform into various animal forms. Tigra is in love with him. In New Mangaverse: The Rings of Fate, he is implied to have been killed by the villains.
- Storm - A weather-manipulating witch and leader of the X-Men. The villainous mutant Amanda Sefton was her friend until she attempted to resurrect the evil spirit Magnus. In X-Men: Ronin, she is briefly in a relationship with Forge, who is killed by Jean Grey. In New Mangaverse: The Rings of Fate, she and all other mutants, except for Wolverine, are implied to have been killed.
- Doctor Strange - The Master of the Mystic Arts, whose assistant is Tigra. He watches over the world while researching new spells and has a rivalry with Baron Mordo. He is killed in New Mangaverse: The Rings of Fate.
- Tigra - Doctor Strange's assistant, who was cursed into the form of a were-tiger and must perform a thousand good deeds for the curse to be broken. She is killed in New Mangaverse: The Rings of Fate.
- The Hulk - Unlike other incarnations, where he is an alternate personality of Bruce Banner, he is a mystical spirit and servant of Dormammu who possessed Banner via the Energy Well. He is based on Godzilla.
- The Megascale Metatalent Response Team - A team based on the Fantastic Four who deal with supernatural threats.
- Daimon Hellstrom and Johnny Blaze - Brothers who are Ghost Riders and sons of Satan. They become monster hunters and battle their evil sister Satana.
- Omar Medina - A creation of Doctor Doom whose primary purpose was to assassinate Doctor Strange and bring his body to Alpha Labs.

== Volume 2 ==
Volume 2 continued the stories of the original series, which were later collected as the first graphic novel. It brings back the Mangaverse version of the Fantastic Four while introducing versions of Galactus, as a parasitic life form created by the Skrulls; Captain Marvel (Marvin Ellwood), the son of Mar-Vell and Alice Ellwood; and the Inhumans. An armored individual resembling Doctor Doom appears in the first few issues before becoming the main villain for the remainder of the series. Revealed to be the sister of Black Panther, he overwhelms the Avengers before being defeated by the Fantastic Four, Doctor Strange, Tigra, and Scarlet Witch.

== X-Men Mangaverse ==
The X-Men first appeared in the first series of one-shots, which were later compiled in Volume 1 of Marvel Mangaverse. Wolverine, Cyclops, Storm, Mirage and Jean Grey form the core of the group, with Rogue living with them but seemingly not being a member. In this version of the X-Men, Wolverine is Cyclops' brother and assembled the team rather than Charles Xavier. He has white hair and a tattoo on his face as well as a prosthetic arm with energy claws. Wolverine is also implied to have been in a relationship with Jean Grey, who began to favor Cyclops. Other X-Men characters appear in the story, most as forces for evil, including Beast, Amanda Sefton, Mystique, and Nightcrawler.

== X-Men: Ronin ==
The story follows the X-Men and the Hellfire Club, who are battling due to the Club's attempts to abduct Jean Grey and bring her into their group. During the story, Storm falls in love with Forge. The Phoenix Force, which was briefly seen in Volume 1 of Mangaverse, becomes more important as Jean develops its powers. Charles Xavier is depicted as the leader of the Hellfire Club, putting him into direct opposition to the X-Men along with his daughters, Sage and Emma Frost. The X-Men are also opposed by the Sentinels, mechas piloted by humans that Jean later destroys. They are aided by Toad, a former friend of Xavier who is determined to destroy the Club and bring him back to the X-Men.

== The Punisher Mangaverse ==
In the story, written by Peter David and pencilled and inked by Lea Hernandez, the Punisher is a woman named Sosumi Brown who is the principal of a private school in Tokyo and operates from her base of operations hidden within the school. She fights against the Korean Skang Kee crime family, led by Skang Kee Ho. The Skang Kee family uses an oni named Oni Yew to try and stop her, but her sister Hashi learns of her secret and obtains a cursed weapon that she uses to kill the oni and save her. In the story, it is explained that they were orphaned following the death of their parents in "a tragic pogo stick accident".

The Punisher of Marvel Mangaverse was part of the stories collected into Volume 1 of the Marvel Mangaverse graphic novels.

== New Mangaverse: The Rings of Fate ==
MJ as Spider-Woman (with Peter). Cover to New Mangaverse #1. Art by Tommy Ohtsuka. This image also appears on the cover of the novel sized New Mangaverse graphic novel which collects the entire miniseries.

New Mangaverse: The Rings of Fate is the third sequel series to Volumes 1 and 2 of Marvel Mangaverse, and takes place some time after the events of Volume 2, Legend of the Spider-Clan, and X-Men: Ronin. Direct references are made to both Legend of the Spider-Clan and Mangaverse Volume 2, meaning that the series ignores the events of Spider-Man Family Featuring the Spider-Clan. The continuity of the story is later ignored in Spiderverse #2, which takes places after the events of the aforementioned single issue. This implies that the series is set in a separate universe adjacent to the original Mangaverse series or the Mangaverse Spider-Man series.

In the story, The Hand makes their first appearance in the Mangaverse, being responsible for the deaths of approximately 99% of the superhuman population of the Mangaverse and armed with the Mandarin's rings. Elektra and Daredevil also make appearances; Elektra kills Daredevil before being killed by Carol Danvers, who takes a costume and shield that once belonged to Captain America.

Tony Stark returns and once again becomes Iron Man. He, along with Spider-Man, Spider-Woman, Black Cat, Wolverine, Iron Man, the Human Torch, and the new Captain America, form a new group of Avengers and battle and defeat the Hand, along with a mind-controlled Sharon Carter. At the end of the series, the Black Cat is revealed to have been working alongside Nick Fury, who is implied to have orchestrated the decimation of the super-powered population. However, whether she is truly loyal to Fury or if he is actually Fury, who is assumed to be dead, is not confirmed.

New Mangaverse, though left open-ended, appears to have been intended as the finale for the Marvel Mangaverse, as most of its superhuman population was killed.

== Mangaverse (revival series) ==
In 2026, Marvel Mangaverse was revived for its 25th anniversary, with five one-shots being published throughout September.

- Marvel Mangaverse: Web of Blood is written by Joe Kelly and Jack Kelly, with art by Kenny Ruiz. The issue follows Spider-Man, Weapon X-Tremis, and Legion as they combat the return of the Phoenix.
- Marvel Mangaverse: Iron Knight is written by Cody Ziglar, with art by Kei Zama. The issue follows Riri Williams, who builds a magic-powered armor to take revenge following the apparent death of her friend Lunella Lafeyette.
- Marvel Mangaverse: Arcane Avengers is written by Ashley Allen, with art by Mirka Andolfo. The issue follows Bucky Barnes, Bloodline, and Wiccan, a group of sorcerers tasked with hunting down yōkai.
- Marvel Mangaverse: Ghostlocke is written by Alyssa Wong, with art by Michael Yg. The issue follows Kwannon as she confronts Carnage, a creature killing both humans and yōkai.
- Marvel Mangaverse: Web of Destiny is written by Joe Kelly and Jack Kelly, with art by Kenny Ruiz. The issue follows Spider-Man, Weapon X-Tremis, and Legion as they come together to save Earth.

== See also ==
- Marvel Anime
- Marvel Comics multiverse
- Spider-Man: The Manga
- X-Men: The Manga
- Hulk: The Manga
- Del Rey Manga/Marvel
- Marvel × Shōnen Jump+ Super Collaboration
