= Marvel × Shōnen Jump+ Super Collaboration =

Japanese manga series

- Cover of the tankōbon volume

MARVEL × 少年ジャンプ+ SUPER COLLABORATION!!
- Genre: Superhero
- Manga
- Written by: Various
- Published by: Shueisha
- Imprint: Jump Comics+
- Magazine: Shōnen Jump+
- Original run: September 3, 2019 – November 27, 2019
- Volumes: 1
- Manga

Secret Reverse
- Written by: Kazuki Takahashi
- Published by: Shueisha
- English publisher: NA: Viz Media
- Imprint: Jump Comics+
- Magazine: Shōnen Jump+
- Published: February 4, 2020
- Volumes: 1
- Manga

Deadpool: Samurai
- Written by: Sanshirō Kasama
- Illustrated by: Hikaru Uesugi
- Published by: Shueisha
- English publisher: NA: Viz Media
- Imprint: Jump Comics+
- Magazine: Shōnen Jump+
- Original run: December 10, 2020 – present
- Volumes: 3

Marvel × Shōnen Jump+ Super Collaboration (Japanese: MARVEL × 少年ジャンプ+ SUPER COLLABORATION!!) is a Japanese manga series produced by the digital distribution platform Shōnen Jump+ in collaboration with the American comic book company Marvel Comics. The series is composed of seven one-shots written by various Weekly Shōnen Jump manga artists that feature Marvel Comics characters. Within the Marvel Comics multiverse, its reality is designated as Earth-346.

== Synopsis ==
Marvel × Shōnen Jump+ Super Collaboration is composed of seven one-shots, each of which is written and illustrated by a different manga artist. The series is composed of the following titles:

Interview with Marvel's Chief Editor for the Upcoming Marvel x Shōnen Jump Collaboration! by Sakurai Takeshi
An interview between the editors of Shōnen Jump+ and Marvel Comics editor-in-chief C. B. Cebulski, depicted as a manga.
Secret Reverse by Kazuki Takahashi
Tony Stark (Iron Man) and Peter Parker (Spider-Man) repel an attack by a villainous CEO at a video game convention in Japan.
Avengers: Gag Reel by Hachi Mizuno
A series of four-panel comics depicting the Avengers in various comedic and slice of life scenarios.
Interview with Heroes by Ken Ogino
Stark, Steve Rogers (Captain America), Thor, and Bruce Banner (The Hulk) are interviewed by a journalist.
Deadpool: Samurai by Sanshirō Kasama and Hikaru Uesugi
Deadpool uses a time machine to travel to feudal Japan, where he fights in a samurai cinema-style action scene.
Halloween Avengers by Mato
To combat an enemy that only appears on Halloween, the Avengers go on patrol while disguised in Halloween costumes.
Ant-Man+ by Toyotaka Haneda
A worried Scott Lang (Ant-Man) follows his daughter to Japan, where she is on a student exchange.

== Development ==
Development of Marvel × Shōnen Jump+ Super Collaboration began in March 2019, in the lead-up to the release of the Marvel Studios film Avengers: Endgame Cebulski noted that Shōnen Jump's focus on "action centered on characters, along with top-class creators that are supported by readers of all ages", as in series such as My Hero Academia and Dragon Ball. He further stated that the collaboration was based on "mutual affection", with the editors of Shōnen Jump+ being fans of Marvel and Cebulski being a long-time fan of manga.

Marvel × Shōnen Jump+ Super Collaboration is Marvel Comics' third collaboration with a Japanese manga publisher. In the 1970s, Marvel partnered with Kodansha to produce manga versions of its franchises, resulting in Spider-Man: The Manga, Hulk: The Manga, and X-Men: The Manga. In 2017 and 2018, the company again partnered with Kodansha on a storyboard art contest, the winner of which received a cash prize and an ongoing serialization in the manga magazine Weekly Shōnen Magazine.

== Releases ==
On March 3, 2019, Shōnen Jump publisher Shueisha announced that it would partner with Marvel Comics to produce Marvel × Shōnen Jump+ Super Collaboration, a manga series featuring Marvel characters. The series, which was written and illustrated by Shōnen Jump-associated writers and artists, was released exclusively on the magazine's digital distribution platform Shōnen Jump+. The series launched on September 3, 2019, with a manga by Sakurai Takeshi illustrating an interview between Shōnen Jump+ editors and Marvel Comics editor-in-chief C. B. Cebulski.

=== Deadpool: Samurai ===
In December 2020, Deadpool: Samurai (デッドプール：SAMURAI) started serialization on the same platform after the one-shot in October 2019, and ended serialization in June 2021. On April 22, 2021, Viz Media announced that it has licensed the manga for English release in North America, the first volume was released on February 8, 2022. The volume introduces the spider-hero Sakura Spider, who returns in Deadpool: Black, White, & Blood ahead of being incorporated into the mainstream Marvel Universe continuity in End of the Spider-Verse in 2023, in which she is stranded on Earth-616, returning in the manga series Spider-Man: Octo-Girl.

On August 1, 2024, Shōnen Jump+ announced that Kasama and Uesugi are launching a new Romantic comedy manga called Secret Steward with Arata Momose coloring the manga's colored pages. However, when the first chapter was released on August 8, 2024, it featured a surprise twist that changes the course of the entire manga and reveals its true nature as Deadpool: Samurai 2nd Season (デッドプール：SAMURAI 2nd season).

=== Secret Reverse ===
The first chapter of Secret Reverse, a manga by Yu-Gi-Oh! creator Kazuki Takahashi, was released the following day. New titles were released in the subsequent months, with Marvel × Shōnen Jump+ Super Collaboration concluding with the second chapter of Secret Reverse on November 27, 2019. A tankōbon volume collecting the series was published on February 4, 2020, under the magazine's Jump Comics+ imprint.

On April 22, 2021, Viz Media announced that it has licensed the manga for English release in North America, the volume was released on June 14, 2022.

== Publications ==
=== English version by VIZ Media ===
- Deadpool: Samurai, Vol. 1:

- paperback (ISBN 978-1-9747-2531-1, 2022-02-08)
- digital (ISBN 978-1-9747-2987-6, 2022-02-08)

- Deadpool: Samurai, Vol. 2:

- paperback (ISBN 978-1-9747-3220-3, 2022-06-14)
- digital (ISBN 978-1-9747-3386-6, 2022-06-14)

- Deadpool: Samurai, Vol. 3:

- paperback (ISBN 978-1-9747-5926-2, 2025-09-09)
- digital (ISBN 978-1-9747-5948-4, 2025-09-09)

- Secret Reverse

- paperback (ISBN 978-1-9747-2854-1, 2022-06-14)
- digital (ISBN 978-1-9747-3304-0, 2022-06-14)

== See also ==
- Marvel Mangaverse
- Marvel Anime
- Marvel Disk Wars: The Avengers
- Marvel Future Avengers
- End of the Spider-Verse
- Spider-Man: Octo-Girl
