= Marvel Anime =

Japanese superhero anime series

- Marvel Comics logo used since 2012. Variations of this logo had been used for the titles of each anime series.

マーベルアニメ (Māberuanime)
- Anime television series

Iron Man
- Directed by: Yūzō Satō; Kenichi Kawamura (assistant)
- Produced by: Tarō Morijima; Fuminori Hara; Cort Lane
- Written by: Toshiki Inoue
- Music by: Tetsuya Takahashi
- Studio: Madhouse
- Licensed by: NA: Sony Pictures Home Entertainment
- Original network: Animax
- English network: AU: Sci Fi Channel; CA: Family Chrgd; US: G4
- Original run: October 1, 2010 – December 17, 2010
- Episodes: 12
- Anime television series

Wolverine
- Directed by: Hiroshi Aoyama; Hajime Ootani (assistant)
- Produced by: Tarō Morijima; Fuminori Hara; Cort Lane
- Written by: Kengo Kaji
- Music by: Tetsuya Takahashi
- Studio: Madhouse
- Licensed by: NA: Sony Pictures Home Entertainment
- Original network: Animax
- English network: AU: Sci Fi Channel; CA: Family Chrgd; US: G4
- Original run: January 7, 2011 – March 25, 2011
- Episodes: 12
- Anime television series

X-Men
- Directed by: Fuminori Kizaki
- Written by: Mitsutaka Hirota; Warren Ellis
- Music by: Tetsuya Takahashi
- Studio: Madhouse
- Licensed by: NA: Sony Pictures Home Entertainment
- Original network: Animax
- English network: AU: Sci Fi Channel; US: G4
- Original run: April 1, 2011 – June 24, 2011
- Episodes: 12
- Anime television series

Blade
- Directed by: Mitsuyuki Masuhara; Chie Yamashiro (assistant)
- Produced by: Tarō Morijima; Fuminori Hara; Cort Lane
- Written by: Kenta Fukasaku
- Music by: Tetsuya Takahashi
- Studio: Madhouse
- Licensed by: NA: Sony Pictures Home Entertainment
- Original network: Animax
- English network: AU: Sci Fi Channel; US: G4
- Original run: July 1, 2011 – September 16, 2011
- Episodes: 12
- Anime films
- Iron Man: Rise of Technovore; Avengers Confidential: Black Widow & Punisher
- Other series
- Marvel Disk Wars: The Avengers; Marvel Future Avengers
- icon

Marvel Anime (Japanese: マーベルアニメ, Hepburn: Māberuanime) is a Japanese superhero anime television series by Madhouse and is based on the Marvel Comics universe. It is an anthology collection consisting of four twelve-episode animated series and two direct-to-video films. The series premiered in 2010 and ended in 2011. Marvel Anime depicts Iron Man, Wolverine, Blade, and the members of the X-Men going to Japan.

== Premise ==
The project reimagined select top Marvel characters and adapts them for a Japanese audience via four 12-part series; Iron Man, Wolverine, X-Men, and Blade, which aired in Japan on Animax between October 2010 and September 2011, and then in the United States on G4 between July 2011 and April 2012. Each of the series largely features Japan as the setting for the storyline.

Wolverine appears in all four of the anime, being a guest star in Iron Man and Blade, with each appearance taking place either before or after his anime.

== Production ==
The entire series was produced in collaboration between Marvel Entertainment, anime studio Madhouse, and Sony Pictures Entertainment Japan. The announcement was confirmed at the 2009 San Diego Comic-Con. According to former Madhouse President and CEO Jungo Maruta, Marvel gave the anime studio free rein to re-imagine the Marvel superheroes for Japanese audiences. The series was guided by writer Warren Ellis. "It will create an entire parallel universe for Marvel," said Simon Philips, president of Marvel International about Marvel Anime.

== Iron Man ==
Cast of Iron Man, Tony Stark and Dr. Chika Tanaka

Iron Man (アイアンマン, Aian Man) (DVD title: Iron Man: Animated Series; spelled IRONMAN on-screen) is the first show of the series with 12 episodes. The series was directed by Yuzo Sato, with Warren Ellis writing the story and Jamie Simone serving as voice director, casting director, and reversion producer for the English version. A special preview ran on Animax on September 25, 2010, before the series began airing on October 1, 2010, and ended on December 17, 2010. While Iron Man premiered in the US on G4 on July 29, 2011, a "sneak peek" of the first episode aired on July 23, 2011, following G4's Comic-Con 2011 Live coverage. The entire series was released on DVD in the United States on April 24, 2012. It was also released on Blu-ray in Japan on June 22, 2011. A follow-up direct-to-video film called Iron Man: Rise of Technovore was released on April 16, 2013.

=== Plot ===
Tony Stark goes to Japan to produce a new arc reactor power station and showcase the Iron Man Dio, a new prototype armor, that will replace him when he retires. But the Iron Man Dio goes berserk and it is up to Tony as Iron Man to stop it along with an organization, known as the "Zodiac". Iron Man even gains an ally in JSDF operative Captain Nagato Sakurai piloting the Ramon Zero armor that his military group made for him. Iron Man soon discovers that his old friend Ho Yinsen, who Tony believed to be dead, is alive and is operating the Iron Man Dio armor for the Zodiac's goals.

=== Cast ===
Role	Japanese voice actor	English voice actor
Iron Man/Tony Stark	Keiji Fujiwara	Adrian Pasdar
Iron Man Dio/Ho Yinsen	Hiroaki Hirata	Kyle Hebert
Dr. Chika Tanaka	Takako Honda	Laura Bailey
Rasetsu/Minister of Defense Kuroda	Unshō Ishizuka	Neil Kaplan
Nanami Ōta	Shizuka Itō	Eden Riegel
Pepper Potts	Hiroe Oka	Cindy Robinson
Ramon Zero/Captain Nagato Sakurai	Jin Yamanoi	Travis Willingham
Ichiro Masuda	Tomoyuki Shimura	Benjamin Diskin
Editor Nomura	Shinya Fukumatsu	Daran Norris
Righella (ep. 4)	Seiji Sasaki	Vic Mignogna
Wolverine/Logan (ep. 4)	Rikiya Koyama	Milo Ventimiglia

== Wolverine ==
Cast of Wolverine, Logan, Mariko Yashida, Shingen Yashida, Kikyo Mikage, and Yukio

Wolverine (ウルヴァリン, Uruvarin) (DVD title: Wolverine: Animated Series) is the second show of the series with 12 episodes. It aired on Animax between January 7, 2011, and March 25, 2011. While Wolverine premiered in the US on G4 on July 29, 2011, a "sneak peek" of the first episode aired on July 23, 2011, following the Iron Man "sneak peek" and G4's Comic-Con 2011 Live coverage. Jamie Simone served as voice director, casting director, and reversion producer for the English version. The entire series was released on DVD in the United States on July 31, 2012. It was also released on Blu-ray in Japan on June 22, 2011.

=== Plot ===
Logan learns that his true love, beloved sweetheart and girlfriend Mariko Yashida, who disappeared one year ago, has been taken to Tokyo by her father Shingen Yashida, the head of the Japanese crime syndicate Kuzuryu and a supplier of A.I.M., in order to be wed to Hideki Kurohagi, a bloodthirsty yakuza boss. Wolverine goes on a quest to rescue Mariko and defeat Shingen and Hideki, encountering several opponents along the way.

=== Cast ===
Role	Japanese voice actor	English voice actor
Wolverine/Logan	Rikiya Koyama	Milo Ventimiglia
Mariko Yashida	Fumiko Orikasa	Gwendoline Yeo
Shingen Yashida	Hidekatsu Shibata	Fred Tatasciore
Hideki Kurohagi	Kazuki Yao	Vic Mignogna
Juo Kurohagi	Shō Hayami	Tony Oliver
Yukio	Romi Park	Kate Higgins
Omega Red/Arkady Rossovich	Ryūzaburō Ōtomo	JB Blanc
Kikyo Mikage	Masato Hagiwara	Steve Blum
Vadhaka	Takanori Hoshino	Jamieson Price
Min	Misato Fukuen	Danielle Judovits
Koh	Iemasa Kayumi	JB Blanc
Tesshin Asano	Masaki Terasoma	Crispin Freeman
Agent Tsukino	Fumie Mizusawa	Stephanie Sheh
Agent Takagi	Hiroshi Tsuchida	Vic Mignogna
Agent Machida	Kousuke Takaguchi	Roger Craig Smith
Miyuki	Sayuri Yamauchi	Stephanie Sheh
Cyclops/Scott Summers (ep. 5 & ep. 6)	Toshiyuki Morikawa	Scott Porter

== X-Men ==
Cast of X-Men, Cyclops, Professor X, Wolverine, Storm, Armor, and Beast

X-Men (エックスメン, Ekkusu Men) (DVD title: X-Men: Animated Series) is the third show of the series with 12 episodes. It aired on Animax from April 1, 2011, to June 24, 2011. A preview trailer was released on February 18, 2011, featuring mutants and some from the X-Men franchise such as Cyclops, Wolverine, Storm, Professor X and Beast. It premiered in the United States on G4 on October 21, 2011. Jamie Simone served as voice director, casting director, and reversion producer for the English version. The entire series was released on DVD in the United States on April 24, 2012. It was also released on Blu-ray in Japan on December 7, 2011.

=== Plot ===
Following the death of Jean Grey, who was being controlled by the Dark Phoenix, due to the sinister influence of the Inner Circle, the X-Men are reassembled by Professor X to travel to Japan following the abduction of Armor and face the U-Men who are abducting young mutants to harvest their organs. During their fight with the U-Men, the X-Men discover that some of the mutants in Japan are suffering from the "Damon Hall Syndrome" which causes problems for mutants during their second mutation. The X-Men must also deal with the next plot of the Inner Circle.

=== Cast ===
Role	Japanese voice actor	English voice actor
Cyclops/Scott Summers	Toshiyuki Morikawa	Scott Porter
Wolverine/Logan	Rikiya Koyama	Steve Blum
Takeo Sasaki	Atsushi Abe	Steve Staley
Professor X/Charles Xavier	Katsunosuke Hori	Cam Clarke
Storm/Ororo Munroe	Aya Hisakawa	Danielle Nicolet
Dark Phoenix/Jean Grey	Yurika Hino	Jennifer Hale
Riko Nirasaki	Marina Inoue	Mary Elizabeth McGlynn
Mastermind/Jason Wyngarde/Jun Sanada	Tomokazu Seki (Jun Sanada); Haruhiko Jō (Mastermind)	Travis Willingham
Kōichi Kaga	Katsuyuki Konishi	Troy Baker
Marsh	Yuichi Nakamura	Mary Elizabeth McGlynn
Rat	Manabu Sakamaki	Michael Sinterniklaas
Yui Sasaki	Yoshiko Sakakibara	Gwendoline Yeo
Beast/Hank McCoy	Hideyuki Tanaka	Fred Tatasciore
Armor/Hisako Ichiki	Yukari Tamura	Stephanie Sheh
Emma Frost	Kaori Yamagata	Ali Hillis
Sublime/Jake	Rintaro Nishi	Troy Baker
Kick/Todd	Wataru Takagi	Dave Wittenberg
Kyoko	Ayumi Fujimura	Laura Bailey
Neuron	Yutaka Aoyama	Dave Wittenberg

== Blade ==
Cast of Blade, Eric Brooks

Blade (ブレイド, Bureido) (DVD title: Blade: Animated Series) is the fourth and final show of the series. Comprising twelve episodes like the others, the story is written by Kenta Fukasaku, son of the late Kinji Fukasaku. Jamie Simone served as casting director, reversion producer, and voice director for the English version where he was assisted by Mary Elizabeth McGlynn. It aired on Animax from July 1, 2011, to September 16, 2011. The entire series was released on DVD in the United States on July 31, 2012. It was also released on Blu-ray in Japan on February 22, 2012.

=== Plot ===
Blade is a "daywalker" vampire hunter who was born with human and vampire blood in his veins after a vampire attacked his mother. Blade is visiting Japan on a mission where he not only confronts Deacon Frost, the vampire who had killed his mother Tara Brooks, but also goes up against a mysterious organization of vampires, known as "Existence".

=== Cast ===
Role	Japanese voice actor	English voice actor
Blade/Eric Brooks	Akio Ohtsuka Junko Minagawa (Young)	Harold Perrineau Noah Bentley (Young)
Deacon Frost	Tsutomu Isobe	JB Blanc
Lucius Isaac	Hiroki Tōchi	Christopher Corey Smith
Makoto	Maaya Sakamoto	Kim Mai Guest
Noah van Helsing	Osamu Saka	Troy Baker
Captain McRay	Shinpachi Tsuji	Steve Blum
Tara Brooks	Atsuko Tanaka	Nayo Wallace
Tanaka	Tetsu Shiratori	Michael Sinterniklaas
Mattes	Nanaho Katsuragi	Kat Purgal
High Council Chairman	Seizo Kato	Neil Kaplan
Wolverine/Logan (ep. 7)	Rikiya Koyama	Milo Ventimiglia
Kikyo Mikage (ep. 8–9, 12)	Masato Hagiwara	Steve Blum

== Films ==
Following the TV series, Madhouse animated two Marvel Anime films.

- The first was Iron Man: Rise of Technovore, a direct-to-video film directed by Hiroshi Hamasaki, which was released on April 16, 2013, in the United States.
- The second was Avengers Confidential: Black Widow & Punisher which was released on March 25, 2014, in the United States.

== Other Marvel anime projects ==
Other anime television series based on Marvel characters have also been produced.

=== Marvel Disk Wars: The Avengers ===
Marvel Disk Wars: The Avengers is a 2014 anime series produced by Walt Disney Japan and Toei Animation. It follows five children that each gain the ability to summon a specific member of Avengers, who have been trapped in small devices called DISKs, as they travel the world to help the Avengers retrieve other superheroes' and supervillains' DISKs before they are used for evil. The series aired on TX Network and ran for 51 episodes.

=== Marvel Future Avengers ===
Marvel Future Avengers is a 2017 anime series produced by Madhouse and Walt Disney Japan. It follows three children who are rescued from Hydra by the Avengers and trained to become superheroes. The series aired for 39 episodes on the Dlife satellite channel, and was released internationally via Disney+ in 2020.

== Release ==
=== Broadcast ===
The Marvel Anime series aired in Japan on Animax between October 2010 and September 2011. An English-language version later aired in North America on G4 between July 2011 and April 2012. Additionally, the Marvel Anime series aired in Australia on Sci Fi.

== See also ==
- Marvel Mangaverse
- Spider-Man: The Manga
- X-Men: The Manga
- Hulk: The Manga
- Del Rey Manga/Marvel
- Marvel × Shōnen Jump+ Super Collaboration
- Attack on Avengers
