= Spider-Man (Marvel Mangaverse) =

Alternate reality version of Spider-Man

Peter Parker Spider-Man
- Mangaverse Spider-Man. Art by Tommy Ohtsuka

Publication information
- Publisher: Marvel Comics
- First appearance: Marvel Mangaverse: Spider-Man (2002)
- Created by: Kaare Andrews

In-story information
- Alter ego: Peter Parker

Spider-Man (Peter Parker) from the Marvel Mangaverse is an alternate version of Spider-Man created by Kaare Andrews and the protagonist of Marvel Mangaverse: Spider-Man. He is just one of many examples of different cultural Spider-Men, much like Spider-Man (Pavitr Prabhakar), Spider-Man 2099, and Miles Morales.

The character made his cinematic debut in the 2023 feature film Spider-Man: Across the Spider-Verse, depicted as a member of Miguel O'Hara's Spider-Society.

== Publication history ==
The Marvel Mangaverse is a comic book universe which was set in the Marvel Comics Multiverse created by Ben Dunn. The universe's incarnation of Peter Parker would debut in Marvel Mangaverse: Spider-Man (2002) a single issue book created, written and drawn by Kaare Andrews. Andrews depicted this version of Spider-Man as a ninja and the last of the Spider Clan after his Uncle Ben was killed by Venom. The character is the third depicted manga version of Spider-Man after Spider-Man: The Manga and Spider-Man J.

== Fictional character biography ==
The Mangaverse Spider-Man first appeared in the one-shot Marvel Mangaverse: Spider-Man (2002) (created, written and drawn by Kaare Andrews) where his origin was very different from the regular Marvel Spider-Man. In the Mangaverse Peter Parker is the last member of the Spider Clan of ninjas and has been taught martial arts by his sensei, Uncle Ben. After Ben's murder by Venom, an underling of the Kingpin, Peter starts to train in secret so he will be strong enough to exact his revenge. In this version of Spider-Man, Aunt May is Peter's mother's sister instead of Uncle Ben being his father's brother. The Mangaverse Spider-Man was brought back for his own mini-series Spider-Man: Legend of the Spider-Clan (again written by original creator Kaare Andrews) in which he encounters Black Cat, as well as the "Venom symbiote". This "symbiote" does not become Venom and has mystical origins being the result of a curse this time and connections to an 'evil' clan of ninja who are affiliated with Spiders, who act as a counterpart to Spider-Man's own ninja clan. Norman Osborn, better known as the Green Goblin, also appears in the series as an antagonist.

Following the first mini-series a story featuring this version of the character appeared in Spider-Man Family. This story picks up after the events of the series with Peter, Aunt May, and Mary Jane visiting the grave of Uncle Ben. The three are then attacked by a group called The Elementals and May is killed in the battle while Mary Jane is wounded and left unconscious. The Elementals then leave Peter alive and broken with no explanation as to why they attacked him other than "our task was to seek you out, Spider. To help you shed your skin. To set you on your path." Whilst mourning the loss of Aunt May a secret Map reveals itself to Peter it leads to the Land of The Spider-Clan and he decides to follow it in hopes of getting answers. Upon finding them Peter learns of Venom's survival from the end of the previous series where he had thought to have died. After a scuffle and a few weeks of healing Peter agrees to let Venom train him in hopes of learning the truth about the Spider-Clan. It is in this training that Peter learns to consciously use the web-shooting ability he gained towards the end of the previous series. After dawning a new suit and training Peter defeats Venom and he leads him to a secret cave where Peter discovers his mother has been hiding still alive and ruling the clan from the shadows. It is then revealed that she is the one who sent the Elementals after Peter and his loved ones, ordering them to kill Aunt May so that'd he'd have nobody left and would join her in ruling the clan. Peter attempts to avenge may, but his mother warps him back home through magic and names Venom as her successor. Peter faces off against the Elementals again and taps into the Web of Life giving him the strength to completely obliterate them. Upon achieving this victory he retires from being Spider-Man leaving his mask on the grave of Aunt May and Uncle Ben.

Unlike in the mainline Marvel Universe where Peter Parker, Mary Jane Watson, and Felicia Hardy are now adults, all three of them are in their early to mid-teens at this point, and possibly their mid-to-late teens by the time of Spider-Verse #2. This version of Spidey dawns a few different versions of his iconic suit, but for the most part he has wrapped gloves, a backpack emblazoned with the spider symbol, and tennis shoes.

=== Spider-Verse ===
The Mangaverse incarnation later appears in the crossover comic book storyline entitled Spider-Verse. He was one of the starred characters in the anthology comic book Spider-Verse #2 starring in the story "Spider Clan: The Many" continuing the Marvel Mangaverse story by picking up sometime after the events of Spider-Man Family Featuring Spider-Clan (2004) as evident by several callbacks made throughout the story. The story is written by Skottie Young and Jake Andrews. Jesse Schedeen of IGN explained that despite that "fans of the Mangaverse Spider-Man will be pleased to see that Peter Parker return", he expressed Kaare Andrews not returning as unfortunate and also expressing disappointment with the new writers. He felt that Young "goes through a lot of effort in sending Peter on a journey to confront his heritage, only for it not to matter much in the end." He also compared it as Avatar: The Last Airbender-lite than being truly manga-inspired. Meanwhile, comic book writer Nick Lowe complimented their work calling it "great".

== Other versions ==
An alternate version of Peter Parker from the Mangaverse appears in the series New Mangaverse (2006) which acts as a sort of reboot of the entire universe given that it ignores the events of Spider-Man Family Featuring the Spider-Clan.

== In other media ==
=== Film ===
The Mangaverse Spider-Man appears in Spider-Man: Across the Spider-Verse as a member of Miguel O'Hara's Spider-Society.

=== Video games ===
- The Mangaverse Spider-Man's suit appears as an alternate suit for the Ultimate Spider-Man in Spider-Man: Shattered Dimensions.
- The Mangaverse Spider-Man appears as an unlockable playable character in Spider-Man Unlimited. He is depicted as the first alternate dimension recruit to help the main version of Spider-Man.
- The Mangaverse Spider-Man's suit appears as an unlockable DLC costume for the titular character of Marvel's Spider-Man as part of the "Turf Wars" DLC.

== Reception ==
Shane Denson of Transnational Perspectives on Graphic Narratives: Comics at the Crossroads was negative on the mini-series starring the comic book character feeling that it did not offer enough transnational and transcultural themes unlike the other manga series starring Spider-Man. He also compared it to Star Wars with Uncle Ben being much like Yoda, Spider-Man being like Luke Skywalker and Venom being like Darth Vader with him being revealed as Spider-Man's cousin.
