= Sitting in the Fire =

Studio album by Troy Baker
- Released: October 14, 2014
- Genre: Alternative rock
- Length: 45:54
- Label: Independent

Troy Baker chronology
Random Thoughts on a Paper Napkin (2004)	Sitting in the Fire (2014)	Moving Around Bias (2017)

Sitting in the Fire is the debut solo studio album by American voice actor and alternative rock musician Troy Baker, released independently on October 14, 2014. It debuted at No. 26 on the iTunes alternative rock chart and No. 137 on the top 200 chart.

== Background ==
Baker called the album "an analogue album in a digital world" and added, "We used to have a unique, kinetic relationship with the music we listened to. You placed the 33 on the platter, 'put the needle down' and for the next 20 minutes just listened to that record. When that needle crossed over to the other side, you had to flip that record over and repeat the process. It was interactive and given the world I'm predominantly known for, an interactive medium is something that interests me."

== Track listing ==
No.	Title	Length
1.	"Overture"	1:29
2.	"My Religion"	2:28
3.	"Halo Eyes"	1:35
4.	"Apparition"	4:04
5.	"Far Away" (feat. Liz Williams)	3:46
6.	"Intermission"	2:40
7.	"Sad Song"	3:59
8.	"Like a Stone"	4:26
9.	"What We Lost in the Fire"	5:19
10.	"Window to the Abbey"	4:27
11.	"Afterglow"	6:30
12.	"Epilogue (Will the Circle Be Unbroken)"	5:11
Total length:		45:54
