= Kure Kure Takora =

Children's TV comedy of 1970s Japan featuring a greedy octopus

Kure Kure Takora (クレクレタコラ; translation: "Gimme Gimme Octopus") is a tokusatsu children's comedy show from Japan. Produced by Toho Company Ltd., the show ran for 260 episodes and aired on Fuji TV from October 1, 1973, to September 27, 1974. Kure Kure Takora—the main character of the show—wants everything he sees and says "Kure! Kure!" ("I want it! I want it!"). Each episode ran exactly 2 minutes and 41 seconds.

Episodes 223, 252, and 255 never aired. The show was eventually rebroadcast over CS digital satellite television, with the exception of episode 220, which was omitted because Takora is repeatedly referred to by his neighbors as "crazy"— which was thought to be verbally abusive towards the mentally ill — as he goes on a violent rampage with a blunt katana. Laserdisc and VHS versions of the show have been released. A complete DVD set (which included episode 220) was released in 2002 but has since gone out of print.

== Staff ==
- Creator/Planning - Osamu Isono
- Writers - Shinichi Ichikawa, Hiroshi Kashiwabara, Yuko Kinoshita, Yoshimi Shinozaki, Yuji Watanabe
- Directors - Katsumune Ishida, Ko Tsuboshima, Tsugunobu Otani
- Music - Shunsuke Kikuchi

== Voice cast ==
- Takora, Chonbo, Monro: Yoshiko Ota
- Debura, Biragon, Herara, Shikushiku, Ikary: Osamu Saka

== Characters ==
- Takora is a red octopus. He uses a type of ninjitsu where he can transform anything from a dopey iguana to a vacuum cleaner to a guitar. His best friend is the weak-willed peanut-inspired Chonbo. While he has friends, he seems to have no problems leaving them for dead if he has to make a fast getaway. Like most of the other characters in the show, Takora is in love with the fickle pink walrus Monro. His greatest fear is being soaked with vinegar and being served as sudako (pickled octopus).
- Chonbo is Takora's best friend, and often accompanies him for his antics. He is a humanoid plant. Although he is complicit in many of Takora's crazy schemes, he along with Takora often face the consequences when these schemes backfire. Chonbo is rather athletic, often seen somersaulting and tumbling.
- Tororo is a short jellyfish who squawks like a dolphin. He is able to spray vinegar out of the top of his head via a sprinkler. As a result of his fear of vinegar, Takora tries to prevent this from happening by giving Tororo a hat. Tororo can turn invisible and teleport at will and is even a bigger troublemaker than Takora. Most of the other characters are frightened of him.
- Monro is a pink walrus who the rest of the cast are in love with. She often demands unreasonable things from her suitors only to lose interest in them. She has been romantically involved with every other character in the series - even the Sea Cucumber Gang.
- Debura is a rotund badger who is often seen chewing on the stub of a cigar, and is the forest's local police officer.
- Biragon is a slow-witted iguana; he is extremely lazy and spends most of his time sleeping. It's implied that he has a lot of money, as he is frequently shown having acquired a new gadget or toy which Takora tries to steal.
- The Sea Cucumber Gang: This comedic trio is made up of Ikary, Herara and Shikushiku, the latter of whom tends to get picked on. They have their own theme song, which they sometimes sing.

== Theme song ==
Roughly translated from Japanese, the lyrics to the show's theme song are:

Gimme! Gimme! Gimme!
I want everything
Gimme Gimme Octopus
Up from the ocean
I got hot and sunburned
Why must I live at the top of the tree
Viewing all my desires through a telescope... I want the stars!
Gimme Gimme Octopus
