= Troy Baker =

American voice actor and musician

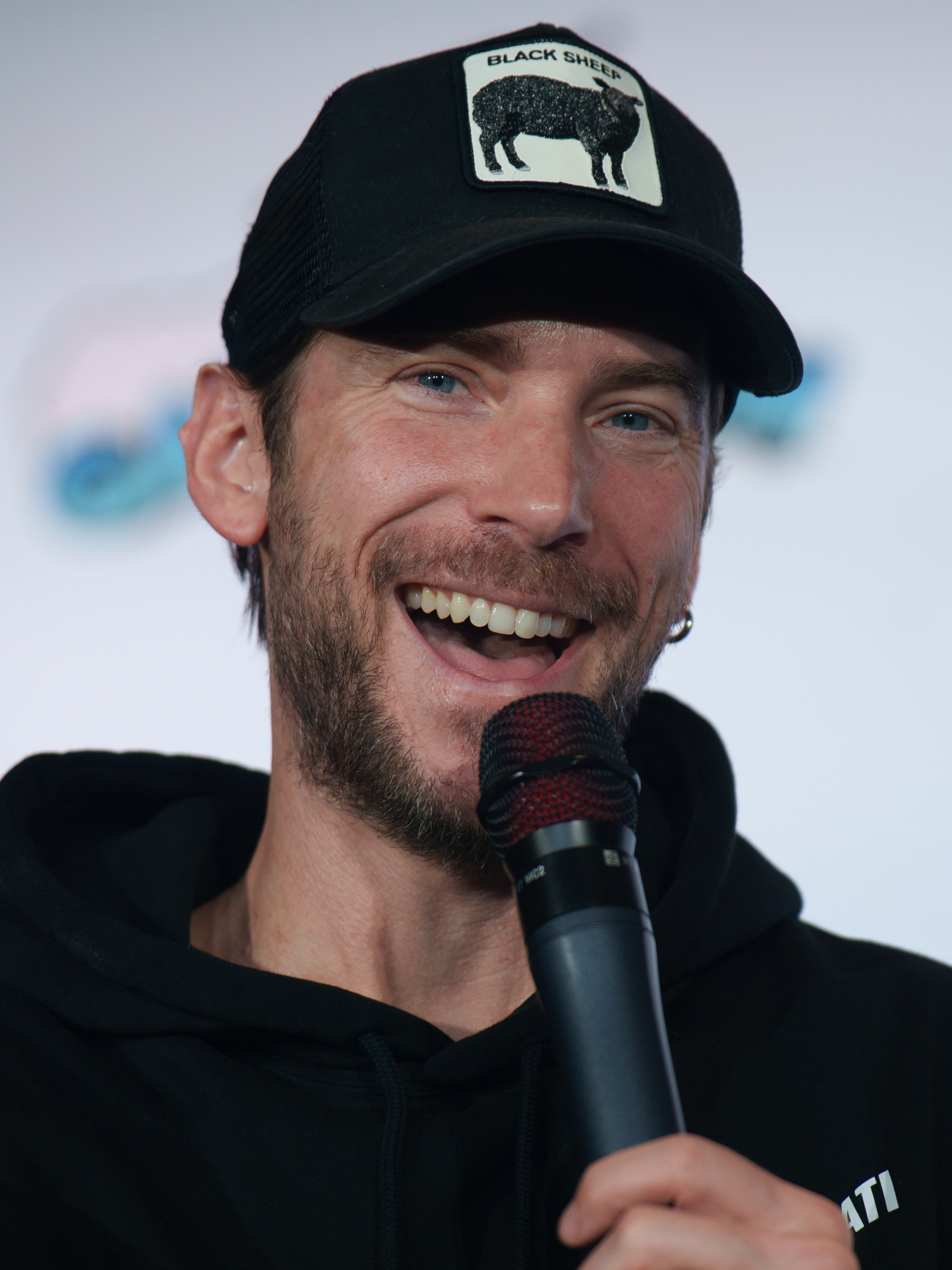
- Baker at GalaxyCon Richmond in 2024
- Born: Dallas, Texas, U.S.
- Occupations: Voice actor; musician
- Years active: 1994–present
- Spouse: Pamela Walworth (m. 2012)
- Children: 1
- Musical career
- Genre: Alternative rock
- Instruments: Vocals; guitar
- Formerly of: Tripp Fontaine; Window to the Abbey

Troy Baker is an American voice actor and musician known for his numerous roles in video games, including Joel Miller in The Last of Us franchise and Rhys Strongfork in Tales from the Borderlands (2014).

Baker holds the record for the most acting nominations at the BAFTA Games Awards, with seven between 2013 and 2026. Baker has also voiced Batman, the Joker, Hawkeye, and Loki in various media, and has provided voices for a number of English dubs of anime, including Bleach, Fullmetal Alchemist: Brotherhood, Naruto: Shippuden, Code Geass, and Soul Eater. He was previously the lead singer and rhythm guitarist for the alternative rock band Tripp Fontaine, with whom he released an album titled Random Thoughts on a Paper Napkin (2004). He then released the solo album Sitting in the Fire (2014) before he and his backing band changed their name to Window to the Abbey and released the album Moving Around Bias (2017).

In 2022, Baker announced his controversial partnership with an NFT company called Voiceverse, which was later discovered to have plagiarized from a free service called 15.ai; Baker ended his partnership two weeks later.

== Career ==
=== Acting ===
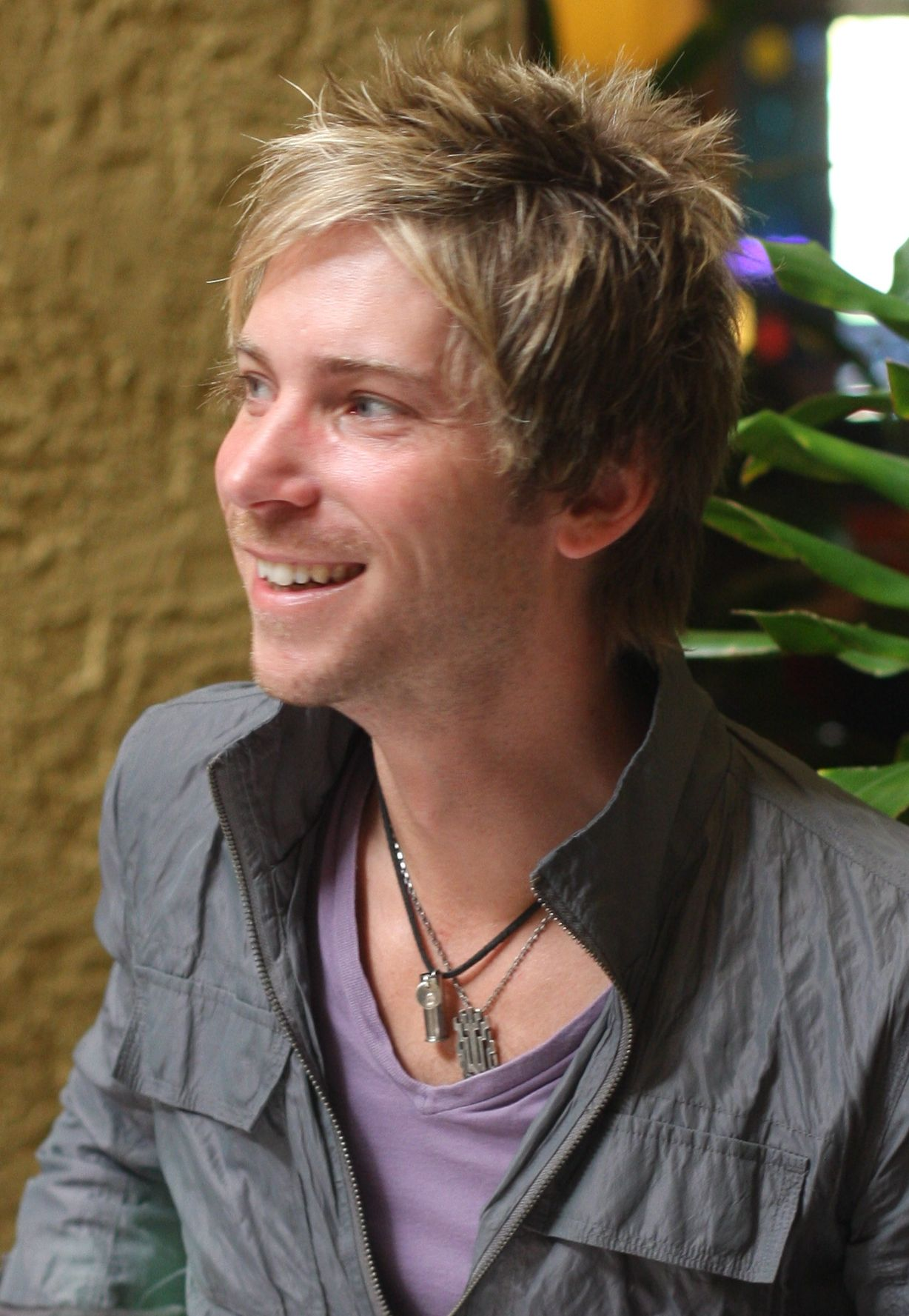
Baker in January 2011

Baker began his voice acting career doing radio commercials in Dallas. He was recruited by Christopher Sabat to do voice-over work at Funimation for the English adaptation of the anime Case Closed. He went on to work in dubbing anime such as Bleach, Dragon Ball Z, Fullmetal Alchemist, Fullmetal Alchemist: Brotherhood, Naruto, Naruto: Shippuden, and the Funimation dub of One Piece. He then moved to Los Angeles and began working on Marvel-based animated series, providing the voice of various characters in The Avengers: Earth's Mightiest Heroes, as well as Hawkeye and Loki in Ultimate Spider-Man and Avengers Assemble.

Baker's career in the video game industry began when he voiced Matt Baker in the tactical shooter series Brothers in Arms. In an interview with The Griff, he said, "It was starting to become necessary for actors to become involved [in gaming], so I got into that and it was literally stumbling from one job into the next. That was kind of my first snowball effect." His most notable roles came in 2013, when he provided the voice of Booker DeWitt in BioShock Infinite and the voice and motion capture of Joel in The Last of Us. Both games earned critical acclaim, gaining scores over 90% on GameRankings and Metacritic, and widespread commercial success. He was nominated for both of these roles at VGX 2013, winning for The Last of Us. He then worked on Uncharted 4: A Thief's End, playing Nathan Drake's older brother Sam. He reprised the role in Uncharted: The Lost Legacy.

In 2011, Baker became the voice of Siris, the hero of Chair Entertainment's blockbuster mobile game series Infinity Blade, and in 2014 he was the voice of Talion, the protagonist of Middle-earth: Shadow of Mordor, which earned a rating of 9.3 on IGN. He also voiced Ace (Experiment 262) in the English dub of the anime Stitch! He was listed on Entertainment Weekly in their "Best of 2013" issue for "Best Breakout Actor" in the video game industry for his performances in The Last of Us, BioShock Infinite, and as the Joker in Batman: Arkham Origins.

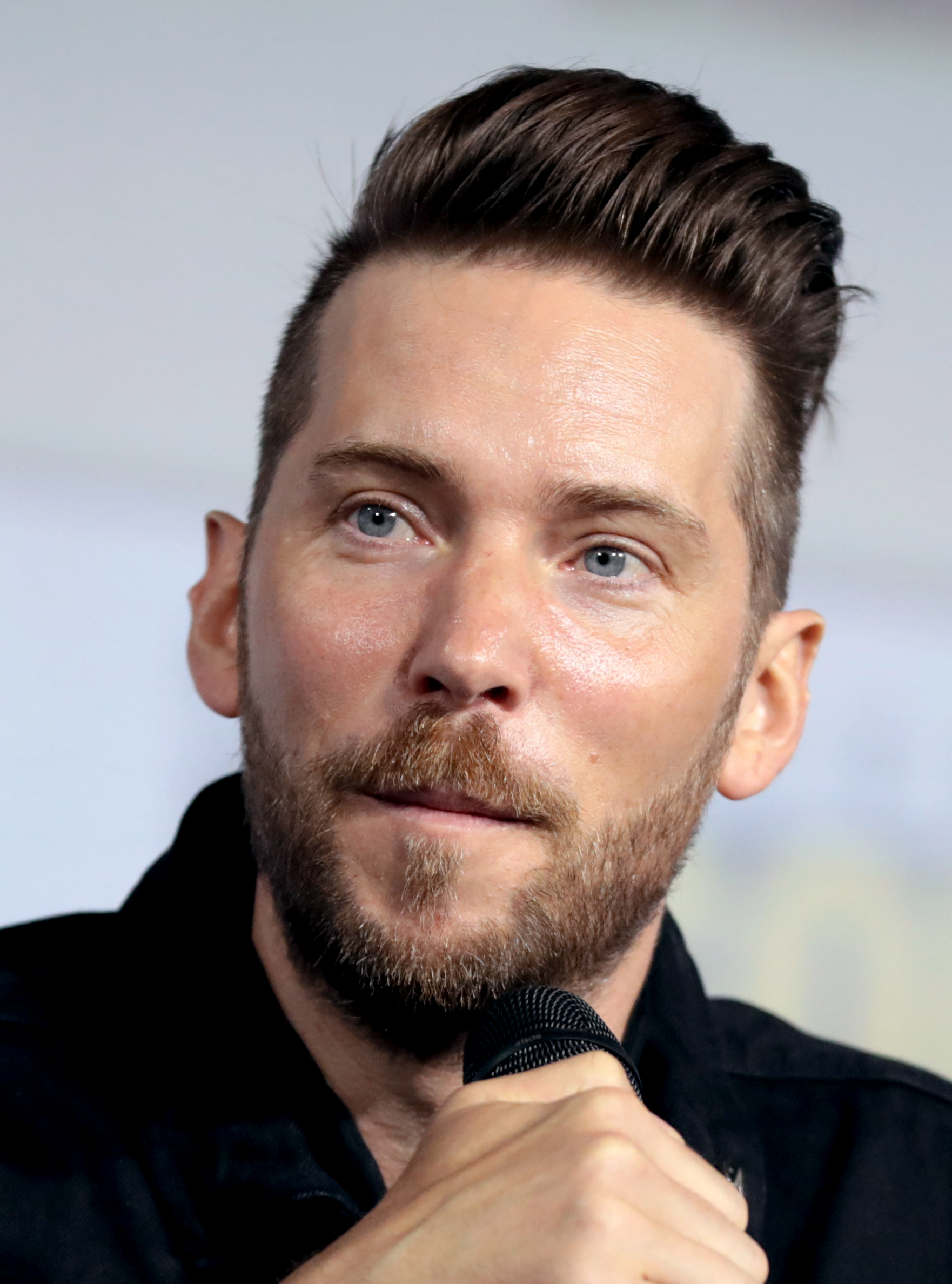
Baker in 2019

In May 2018, Baker and voice actor Nolan North began hosting the weekly YouTube series Retro Replay. In April 2020, due to an apparent disagreement on the future direction of the show, Baker left to start his own series.

=== Voiceverse partnership and plagiarism scandal, NFTs, and generative AI ===
On January 14, 2022, Troy Baker announced a partnership with blockchain-based company Voiceverse, which was immediately met with negative reception. The announcement was particularly controversial due to Baker's confrontational tone, ending his tweet with "You can hate. Or you can create." Later that day, it was discovered that Voiceverse had used voice technology from 15.ai—a free, non-commercial text-to-speech application—without permission or attribution. Screenshots of log files posted by 15, the developer of 15.ai, revealed that Voiceverse had generated audio using 15.ai's voices from My Little Pony: Friendship Is Magic, pitched them up to make them unrecognizable, and then sold them as non-fungible tokens (NFT). News publications and AI watchdog groups universally characterized the incident as theft and plagiarism. Following the continued backlash and plagiarism revelation, Baker acknowledged on January 31, 2022, that his original announcement may have been "antagonistic" and announced that he would discontinue his partnership with Voiceverse. In 2023, /Film described Baker's former partnership with Voiceverse as "one of [his] less reputable roles".

In January 2026, Eurogamer referenced the plagiarism scandal in regards to Baker's comments about generative AI, writing that his Voiceverse partnership had resulted in "fierce backlash" as a result of his "provocative marketing".

=== Music ===
Before pursuing acting, Baker was the lead singer and rhythm guitarist for the alternative rock band Tripp Fontaine, which released the radio single "Burning Out" from their debut album Random Thoughts on a Paper Napkin in 2004.

Baker's first solo album, Sitting in the Fire, was released on October 14, 2014. On October 6, 2017, Baker and his backing band, also called Sitting in the Fire, released his second album Moving Around Bias under the new name of Window to the Abbey.

== Personal life ==
In 2012, Baker married photographer Pamela Walworth, also from Dallas. They reside in Los Angeles. They have a son who was born in 2018.

== Filmography ==
=== Anime ===
| Year | Title | Role | Notes | Ref. |
|---|---|---|---|---|
| 2004–09 | Case Closed | Gin | | |
| 2005 | Gunslinger Girl | Alfonso, additional voices | | |
| 2005 | Baki the Grappler | Katou, Rob Robinson, Copperhead, additional voices | | |
| 2005 | The Galaxy Railways | Wataru Yuuki | | |
| 2005 | Fullmetal Alchemist | Frank Archer, additional voices | | |
| 2005 | Yu Yu Hakusho | Shunjun | Eps. 91–92, 98 | |
| 2006 | Desert Punk | Makoto | | |
| 2006 | Negima! | Nagi Springfield | | |
| 2006 | Basilisk: The Kōga Ninja Scrolls | Kouga Gennosuke | | |
| 2006 | Trinity Blood | Abel Nightroad | | |
| 2006 | MoonPhase | Count Kinkel | | |
| 2006 | Ergo Proxy | Kazkis Hauer, Soldier B | Ep. 9 | |
| 2006 | Black Cat | Jenos Hazard | | |
| 2007 | Peach Girl | Toru, Honda | | |
| 2007 | Suzuka | Coach | Ep. 4 | |
| 2008 | Naruto | Yashiro Uchiha, Renga, Hokushin | Eps. 129, 164, 187 | |
| 2008 | The Third: The Girl with the Blue Eye | Leon | Eps. 13, 15 | |
| 2008 | Shin Chan | Action Bastard | Funimation dub | |
| 2008 | Tsubasa: Reservoir Chronicle | Kyle, Kusanagi | | |
| 2008 | Darker than Black | November 11, Jack Simon | | |
| 2008–09 | Bleach | Jin Kariya | | |
| 2008–09 | Code Geass series | Schneizel el Britannia | | |
| 2008–10 | One Piece | Helmeppo, Ohm (One Piece character), Additional Voices | Funimation dub | |
| 2009 | Monster | Jaromir Lipsky, Heinz | | |
| 2009–14 | Naruto: Shippuden | Yamato, Pain, Gamahiro, Kiho, Yahiko, Additional Voices | | |
| 2010 | Soul Eater | Excalibur, White Star | | |
| 2010 | Mobile Suit Gundam Unicorn | Syam Vist, Gilboa Sant, Alec, Announcer | | |
| 2010 | Slayers Revolution | Zuuma | | |
| 2010 | Slayers Evolution-R | Radok, Zuuma | | |
| 2010 | Vampire Knight Guilty | Akatsuki Kain | | |
| 2010 | Eden of the East | Ryosuke Morimi | Also related films | |
| 2010–13 | Stitch! | Ace (Experiment 262) | Eps. 10, 29–30 | |
| 2011 | Fullmetal Alchemist: Brotherhood | Greed | Second incarnation only | |
| 2011 | Kekkaishi | Madarao, Kaguro | | |
| 2011 | Marvel Anime | Koichi Kaga, Sublime, Noah van Helsing | Series: Iron Man, Wolverine, Blade, X-Men | |
| 2011 | Persona 4: The Animation | Kanji Tatsumi | Eps. 1–12 | |
| 2018–20 | Baki | Baki / Baki Hanma | Netflix ONA | |

=== Animation ===
| Year | Title | Role | Notes | Ref. |
|---|---|---|---|---|
| 2010 | Gormiti: The Lords of Nature Return! | Magor, Old Sage | | |
| 2010 | Monster High | Mr. Lou Zarr | Episode: "New Ghoul @ School" | |
| 2010–12 | Scooby-Doo! Mystery Incorporated | Blue Falcon, Red Humungonaut, Krod, Dreamweaver, others | | |
| 2010–12 | The Avengers: Earth's Mightiest Heroes | Clay Quartermain, Whirlwind, Blizzard, Grey Gargoyle, Constrictor, Michael Korvac, Glenn Talbot, Groot, Ulik, Sydren, Robbie Robertson, additional voices | | |
| 2010–13 | Generator Rex | Van Kleiss, Biowulf, Roswell, Etude, Weaver, various voices | | |
| 2011 | G.I. Joe: Renegades | Dr. Kurt Schnurr / Airtight | Episode: "The Anaconda Strain" | |
| 2011–17 | Regular Show | Dr. Rueben Langer, Klorgbane the Destroyer, Park Avenue, David, others | | |
| 2012–14 | NFL Rush Zone: Season of the Guardians | Wild Card, Warren, Coach Wildwood, Charles Reynolds | | |
| 2012–17 | Ultimate Spider-Man | Loki, Hawkeye, Montana, Shocker, Web-Slinger, others | | |
| 2013 | Lego Marvel Super Heroes: Maximum Overload | Loki | Television special | |
| 2013–19 | Avengers Assemble | Hawkeye, Loki, Red Guardian, Whiplash, Kraven the Hunter, various voices | | |
| 2014 | Clarence | Troy, Keith Mack, Laser Game Voice | Episode: "Money Broom Wizard" | |
| 2014–15 | Hulk and the Agents of S.M.A.S.H. | Loki, Asgardian Guard | | |
| 2015 | Batman Unlimited | The Joker | Web series | |
| 2015 | Lego Marvel Super Heroes: Avengers Reassembled | Hawkeye | Television special | |
| 2015–17 | Transformers: Robots in Disguise | Steeljaw, Vector Prime, Vladd Gastlee, Arnold | | |
| 2016 | Guardians of the Galaxy | Loki, Hawkeye, various voices | | |
| 2016 | Be Cool, Scooby-Doo! | Jack, Josh, Jester | | |
| 2016–17 | Justice League Action | Hawkman, Jonas Glim, Kanto | | |
| 2017–18 | Spider-Man | Kraven the Hunter, Hot Dog Guy | | 2 episodes |
| 2017–18 | Stretch Armstrong & The Flex Fighters | Mortar | | |
| 2017–2020 | Ben 10 | Lord Decibel | | |
| 2019 | American Dad! | The Narrator, Ernie | | |
| 2019–21 | Carmen Sandiego | Dash Haber | | |
| 2019–22 | Amphibia | Captain Grime | | |
| 2019–22 | Young Justice | Geo-Force, Guy Gardner, Simon Ecks, Blue Devil, others | Seasons 3–4 | |
| 2020 | Lego City Adventures | Snake Rattler | Season 2 | |
| 2021 | Dota: Dragon's Blood | Invoker, Dark Moon Order Guard, Crazed Soldier, various voices | Netflix series | |
| 2021 | Family Guy | Jorah Mormont | 2 episodes | |
| 2021 | Rick and Morty | Timmy Timtim | 2 episodes | |
| 2022 | Love, Death & Robots | Torrin | Episode: "Bad Travelling" | |
| 2023 | The Legend of Vox Machina | Syldor Vessar | | |
| 2023 | Transformers: EarthSpark | Shockwave | 3 episodes | |
| 2025 | The Simpsons | John "Jonesy" Jones | Episode: "Bad Boys... for Life?" | |
| 2026 | Invincible | Nolan's Father, Gelderian Warrior | Episode: "I'll Give You the Grand Tour" | |

=== Film ===
| Year | Title | Role | Notes | Ref. |
|---|---|---|---|---|
| 2005–06 | Lupin III TV specials | Nabikov ("Dollar"), Additional Voices | Island of Assassins; Crisis in Tokyo; The Columbus Files; Missed by a Dollar | |
| 2005-06 | Dragon Ball films | Ginger, Dr. Kochin, Hoi | Dead Zone; The World's Strongest; Wrath of the Dragon | |
| 2006–10 | Case Closed films | Gin, Henry Tish, Jake Marano | The Time Bombed Skyscraper; The Fourteenth Target; Countdown to Heaven | |
| 2008 | The Sky Crawlers | Naofumi Tokino | Uncredited | |
| 2008 | xxxHolic: A Midsummer Night's Dream | Young Man | | |
| 2008 | The Blue Elephant | Marong, Minchit Sra | | |
| 2012 | Ben 10: Destroy All Aliens | Azmuth's Father, Student | Television film | |
| 2012 | Delhi Safari | Tiger | | |
| 2012 | Tales of Vesperia: The First Strike | Yuri Lowell | | |
| 2012 | Scooby-Doo! Spooky Games | Sergey Plotnikov | Direct-to-video | |
| 2012 | Dear Dracula | Additional Voices | | |
| 2012 | Sengoku Basara: The Last Party | Ishida Mitsunari | | |
| 2013 | Iron Man: Rise of Technovore | Hawkeye, J.A.R.V.I.S. | Direct-to-video | |
| 2013 | Lego Batman: The Movie – DC Super Heroes Unite | Batman, Two-Face, Brainiac | Direct-to-video | |
| 2013 | Scooby-Doo! Stage Fright | Phantom, Lance Damon | Direct-to-video | |
| 2014 | Batman: Assault on Arkham | The Joker | Direct-to-video | |
| 2014 | Lego DC Comics: Batman Be-Leaguered | Batman | Direct-to-video | |
| 2015 | Lego DC Comics Super Heroes: Justice League vs. Bizarro League | Batman, Batzarro | Direct-to-video | |
| 2015 | Batman vs. Robin | Owl Lieutenant | Direct-to-video | |
| 2015 | Justice League: Battle for Metropolis 4D | The Joker | Direct-to-video | |
| 2015 | Batman Unlimited: Monster Mayhem | Joker | Direct-to-video | |
| 2015 | Lego DC Comics Super Heroes: Justice League: Attack of the Legion of Doom | Batman | Direct-to-video | |
| 2015 | Marvel Super Hero Adventures: Frost Fight! | Loki | | |
| 2015 | The Last: Naruto the Movie | Pain | | |
| 2016 | Lego DC Comics Super Heroes: Justice League: Cosmic Clash | Batman | Direct-to-video | |
| 2016 | Lego DC Comics Super Heroes: Justice League: Gotham City Breakout | Batman | Direct-to-video | |
| 2016 | Batman Unlimited: Mechs vs. Mutants | Joker, Two-Face | Direct-to-video | |
| 2018 | Lego DC Comics Super Heroes: The Flash | Batman | Direct-to-video | |
| 2018 | Lego DC Comics Super Heroes: Aquaman – Rage of Atlantis | Batman | Direct-to-video | |
| 2019 | Code Geass: Lelouch of the Re;surrection | Schneizel el Britannia | | |
| 2019 | Batman vs. Teenage Mutant Ninja Turtles | Batman, Joker | Direct-to-video | |
| 2019 | Lego DC Batman: Family Matters | Batman | Direct-to-video | |
| 2020 | Lego DC Shazam! Magic and Monsters | Batman, Carmine Falcone | Direct-to-video | |
| 2021 | Batman: The Long Halloween, Part One | Joker, Antoni | Direct-to-video | |
| 2021 | Batman: The Long Halloween, Part Two | Joker | Direct-to-video | |
| 2022 | Batman and Superman: Battle of the Super Sons | Batman | Direct-to-video | |
| 2023 | Justice League: Warworld | Jonah Hex | Direct-to-video | |
| 2023 | Justice League x RWBY: Super Heroes & Huntsmen, Part Two | Batman, Mirror Master | Direct-to-video | |
| 2024 | Justice League: Crisis on Infinite Earth – Part Two | Joker | Direct-to-video | |
| 2024 | Justice League: Crisis on Infinite Earths – Part Three | Joker, Spider Guild Lantern | Direct-to-video | |
| 2024 | Watchmen | Ozymandias, additional voices | Direct-to-video | |

=== Video games ===
| Year | Title | Role | Notes | Ref. |
|---|---|---|---|---|
| 2004 | BloodRayne 2 | Severin, Kagan | | |
| 2005 | Fullmetal Alchemist and the Broken Angel | Outlaw Alchemist | | |
| 2005 | Brothers in Arms: Road to Hill 30 | Sgt. Matt Baker | Grouped under "Voice Talent" | |
| 2005 | Brothers in Arms: Earned in Blood | Sgt. Matt Baker | Grouped under "Voice Talent" | |
| 2005 | Æon Flux | Trevor Goodchild, Soldiers | | |
| 2006 | Brothers in Arms: D-Day | Sgt. Matt Baker | Grouped under "Voice Talent" | |
| 2007 | Metroid Prime 3: Corruption | Various Soldiers | Grouped as "Voice Acting" | |
| 2007 | Trauma Center: New Blood | | Uncredited (Note: The English voice actors were not listed in the closing credits.) | |
| 2008 | Tales of Vesperia | Yuri Lowell | Also Definitive Edition | |
| 2008 | Armored Core: For Answer | Uncredited | Grouped under "Voice Talent" | |
| 2008 | Brothers in Arms: Hell's Highway | Sgt. Matt Baker | Grouped under "Voice Talent" | |
| 2008 | Star Ocean: First Departure | Additional Voices | Credited as Tripp Fontaine | |
| 2008 | Quantum of Solace | Supporting Cast | | |
| 2008 | Resistance 2 | Major Richard Blake | Grouped under "Voice Talent" | |
| 2008 | Age of Conan: Hyborian Adventures | Conan, The Grey Leopard | Also Rise of the Godslayer | |
| 2008 | Gothic 3: Forsaken Gods | Starring | | |
| 2008 | The Last Remnant | Cast | | |
| 2008 | Persona 4 | Kanji Tatsumi | | |
| 2009 | Red Faction: Guerrilla | Alec Mason | Also Remastered | |
| 2009 | Prototype | Miscellaneous Voices | | |
| 2009 | Ghostbusters: The Video Game | Slimer | Also Remastered | |
| 2009 | Star Wars: The Clone Wars – Republic Heroes | Kul Teska | | |
| 2009 | Marvel Super Hero Squad | Shield Soldier #2, AIM Agent #2, Civilian #3, Delivery Boy | | |
| 2009 | Call of Duty: Modern Warfare 2 | Private First Class Joseph Allen / Private Wade / Private Wells / Royce | Also Mobilized and Remastered | |
| 2009 | Resident Evil: The Darkside Chronicles | Others | | |
| 2010 | Darksiders | Abaddon, Straga, Tortured Gate | Also Warmastered | |
| 2010 | Army of Two: The 40th Day | US Elite | | |
| 2010 | White Knight Chronicles | Additional Voices | | |
| 2010 | Final Fantasy XIII | Snow Villiers | | |
| 2010 | Metal Gear Solid: Peace Walker | Soldiers, Extras | | |
| 2010 | Transformers: War for Cybertron | Jetfire, Zeta Prime | Credited as Troy E. Baker | |
| 2010 | Ninety-Nine Nights II | Galen | | |
| 2010 | Singularity | Additional Voices | | |
| 2010 | The Last Airbender | Voice Actors | | |
| 2010 | Clash of the Titans | Hades, Apollo, Soldiers | | |
| 2010 | Mafia II | Civilians | | |
| 2010 | Valkyria Chronicles II | Dirk Gassenarl | | |
| 2010 | Quantum Theory | Shiro, Zolf | | |
| 2010 | Guitar Hero: Warriors of Rock | Voice Acting | | |
| 2010 | Sengoku Basara: Samurai Heroes | Mitsunari Ishida | | |
| 2010 | Cabela's Dangerous Hunts 2011 | Cole Rainsford | | |
| 2010 | Sniper: Ghost Warrior | Rodriguez | Uncredited | |
| 2010 | Fable III | Walla Voice Actors | | |
| 2010 | Call of Duty: Black Ops | Terrance Brooks | | |
| 2009–18 | Naruto series | Yamato, Pain | | |
| 2010–12 | Sonic the Hedgehog series | Espio the Chameleon | | |
| 2011 | Knights Contract | Johann Faust | | |
| 2011 | SOCOM 4: U.S. Navy SEALs | ClawHammer Commander, Officer | | |
| 2011 | Dead or Alive: Dimensions | Ryu Hayabusa | | |
| 2011 | Red Faction: Armageddon | | | |
| 2011 | Shadows of the Damned | Singers | | |
| 2011 | Catherine | Vincent Brooks | | |
| 2011 | Bodycount | Cast | | |
| 2011 | Disgaea 4: A Promise Unforgotten | Valvatorez | | |
| 2011 | White Knight Chronicles II | Scardigne | | |
| 2011 | Batman: Arkham City | Tim Drake / Robin, Two-Face | Grouped under "Voice Over Actors"; Also Harley Quinn's Revenge DLC | |
| 2011 | Kinect Sports: Season Two | Football Commentator | | |
| 2011 | Generator Rex: Agent of Providence | Biowulf, Van Kleiss | | |
| 2011 | Cabela's Survival: Shadows of Katmai | The Narrator | | |
| 2011 | Call of Duty: Modern Warfare 3 | Additional Voices | Also Defiance; Grouped as "VO Actors") | |
| 2011 | Saints Row: The Third | The Boss (Default Male Voice) | | |
| 2011 | Ultimate Marvel vs. Capcom 3 | Nova | Grouped under "Voice Talent" | |
| 2011 | Kinect Disneyland Adventures | Additional Voices | Grouped under "Featuring the English Voice Talent of" | |
| 2011 | Infinity Blade II | Siris | | |
| 2011 | Batman: Arkham City Lockdown | Robin | Grouped under "Voice Over Actors" | |
| 2011 | Star Wars: The Old Republic | Zenith, Theron Shan | | |
| 2011 | Final Fantasy XIII-2 | Snow Villiers | | |
| 2012 | The Darkness II | Additional Voices | | |
| 2012 | Binary Domain | Charles Gregory | Also motion capture | |
| 2012 | Mass Effect 3 | Kai Leng | | |
| 2012 | Armored Core V | Migrant AC, Zodiac No. 3, Computer Voice #2 | | |
| 2012 | Silent Hill 2 HD | James Sunderland | | |
| 2012 | Ninja Gaiden 3 | Ryu Hayabusa | Also Razor's Edge | |
| 2012 | Kid Icarus: Uprising | Arlon, Pyrrhon | | |
| 2012 | Kinect Star Wars | Civilian | | |
| 2012 | Prototype 2 | Additional Voices | | |
| 2012 | Starhawk | Rifters, Outcast Prisoner | | |
| 2012 | Diablo III | Scoundrel, Monster Voice Effects | Also Reaper of Souls | |
| 2012 | Dragon's Dogma | Voice Actors | Also Dark Arisen | |
| 2012 | MIB: Alien Crisis | Peter Delacoeur / Agent P, Sanchez | | |
| 2012 | Sniper: Ghost Warrior 2 | Cole Anderson | Uncredited | |
| 2012 | Sorcery | Dash | | |
| 2012 | Tom Clancy's Ghost Recon: Future Soldier | Ghost 30K, Additional Voices | | |
| 2012 | Unchained Blades | Fang | | |
| 2012 | Lego Batman 2: DC Super Heroes | Batman, Two-Face, Sinestro, Brainiac, Hawkman | | |
| 2012 | The Amazing Spider-Man | Additional Voice Over Actors | | |
| 2012 | Infex | Voice Cast | | |
| 2012 | Darksiders II | Draven, The Sleeping Warden, The Phariseer, The Abyssal Forge, The Lost Warden, Legion | Also Definitive Edition | |
| 2012 | Transformers: Fall of Cybertron | Jazz, Jetfire, Kickback | | |
| 2012 | Guild Wars 2 | Logan Thackeray | Grouped as "Voice Talent"; Also in Heart of Thorns | |
| 2012 | Resident Evil 6 | Jake Muller | Also motion capture | |
| 2012 | Professor Layton and the Miracle Mask | Voice Actors | | |
| 2012 | Halo 4 | Additional Voices | | |
| 2012 | Call of Duty: Black Ops II | Multiplayer, Additional Voices | | |
| 2012 | Persona 4 Golden | Kanji Tatsumi | | |
| 2012 | Guardians of Middle-earth | Talent | | |
| 2012–16 | Skylanders series | Sunburn, Brock, Rattle Shake | Grouped as "Voice Actors" (Note: Skylanders roles are reprising for later releases.) | |
| 2013 | God of War: Ascension | Orkos | Also motion capture for Orkos | |
| 2013 | The Walking Dead: Survival Instinct | Aiden, Walker | | |
| 2013 | BioShock Infinite | Booker DeWitt | Also Burial at Sea; Grouped as "Voice Acting Ensemble") | |
| 2013 | Injustice: Gods Among Us | Nightwing, Sinestro, Atlantean Soldier | Grouped under "Voice Talent" | |
| 2013 | Metro: Last Light | English Voice Talent | | |
| 2013 | Unearthed: Trail of Ibn Battuta | English Voiceover Cast | | |
| 2013 | Marvel Heroes | Nova (Richard Rider), Deadpool Kid | | |
| 2013 | The Last of Us | Joel Miller | Also motion capture Also Left Behind | |
| 2013 | Saints Row IV | The President (Male) | | |
| 2013 | Infinity Blade III | Siris | | |
| 2013 | Lego Marvel Super Heroes | Fandral, Groot, Hawkeye, J.A.R.V.I.S., Loki, Moon Knight | Grouped under "VO Talent" | |
| 2013 | Batman: Arkham Origins | The Joker | Also Blackgate | |
| 2014 | Lightning Returns: Final Fantasy XIII | Snow Villiers | | |
| 2014 | Titanfall | Additional Voice Talent | | |
| 2014 | Infamous Second Son | Delsin Rowe | Also motion capture Also First Light | |
| 2014 | The Elder Scrolls Online | Additional Voices | | |
| 2014 | WildStar | Deadeye Brightland, Kevo, Exiled Male | | |
| 2014 | Transformers: Rise of the Dark Spark | Jazz, Jetfire, Kickback | | |
| 2014 | Lichdom: Battlemage | Dragon, Gryphon | Grouped under "Voice Actors" | |
| 2014 | Middle-earth: Shadow of Mordor | Talion | Also motion capture | |
| 2014 | Call of Duty: Advanced Warfare | Jack Mitchell | Also likeness and motion capture | |
| 2014 | Lego Batman 3: Beyond Gotham | Batman, Batman of Zur-En-Arrh, Batman (Terry McGinnis), Music Meister, Atom, Hush, Killer Moth, Red Hood, Trickster | Grouped under "Voice Talent" | |
| 2014 | World of Warcraft: Warlords of Draenor | Gul'dan | Grouped under "Voice Over Cast" | |
| 2014 | Far Cry 4 | Pagan Min | | |
| 2014 | The Crew | Alex | | |
| 2014–15 | Disney Infinity series | Hawkeye, Loki | | |
| 2014–15 | Tales from the Borderlands | Rhys, Tommy, Additional Voices | | , Ep. 4 credits |
| 2015 | The Elder Scrolls Online: Tamriel Unlimited | Additional Voices | | |
| 2015 | Infinite Crisis | Superman | | |
| 2015 | Mortal Kombat X | Erron Black, Fujin, Shinnok | Grouped under "English Voice Talent" | |
| 2015 | Lego Jurassic World | Voice Cast | | |
| 2015 | Batman: Arkham Knight | Two-Face, Jason Todd / Arkham Knight | Grouped under "Voiceover & Mocap Talent" | |
| 2015 | Metal Gear Solid V: The Phantom Pain | Revolver Ocelot | Also motion capture | |
| 2015 | Lego Dimensions | Batman, Two-Face, Honest Joe Statler, The Digital Overlord | Grouped as "Voiceover Talent" | |
| 2016 | Uncharted 4: A Thief's End | Samuel Drake | Also motion capture | |
| 2016 | Heroes of the Storm | Gul'dan | | |
| 2016 | Batman: The Telltale Series | Bruce Wayne / Batman, Thomas Wayne | | |
| 2016 | Master of Orion: Conquer the Stars | Klackon Advisor, Psilon Emperor, Gnolam Emperor | | |
| 2016 | World of Warcraft: Legion | Gul'dan | Grouped under "Voice Over Cast" | |
| 2016 | The Elder Scrolls Online: Gold Edition | Additional Voices | Footage | |
| 2016 | Batman: Arkham VR | Jason Todd | | |
| 2016 | World of Final Fantasy | Snow Villiers | Also in Maxima | |
| 2017 | The Elder Scrolls Online: Morrowind | Additional Voices | Footage | |
| 2017 | Lone Echo | Jack / Echo One | | |
| 2017 | Uncharted: The Lost Legacy | Samuel Drake | | |
| 2017 | Middle-earth: Shadow of War | Talion | Also motion capture director | |
| 2017–18 | Batman: The Enemy Within | Bruce Wayne / Batman, Goon #3 | | |
| 2018 | God of War | Magni | Grouped under "Principal Cast" | |
| 2018 | The Elder Scrolls Online: Summerset | Additional Voices | Footage | |
| 2019 | Dissidia Final Fantasy NT | Snow Villiers | | |
| 2019 | The Elder Scrolls Online: Elsweyr | Additional Voices | Footage | |
| 2019 | Catherine: Full Body | Vincent Brooks | | |
| 2019 | John Wick Hex | Hex | | |
| 2019 | Call of Duty: Modern Warfare | Corporal Davis | | |
| 2019 | Death Stranding | Higgs Monaghan | Also motion capture | |
| 2019 | Darksiders: Genesis | Abaddon | | |
| 2019–20 | Mortal Kombat 11 | Erron Black, Shinnok | Grouped under "English Voice Talent"; Also in Aftermath and Ultimate | |
| 2020 | The Elder Scrolls Online: Greymoor | Additional Voices | Footage | |
| 2020 | The Last of Us Part II | Joel Miller | Also motion capture | |
| 2020 | Fortnite | Agent Jones | | |
| 2020 | Avengers | Bruce Banner | | |
| 2020 | Ben 10: Power Trip | Additional Voices | | |
| 2020 | Per Aspera | Nathan Foster | | |
| 2020 | Dirt 5 | AJ | | |
| 2020 | Spider-Man: Miles Morales | Simon Krieger | also motion capture | |
| 2020 | The Pathless | Godslayer | | |
| 2021 | The Medium | The Maw | | |
| 2021 | The Elder Scrolls Online: Blackwood | Additional Voices | Footage | |
| 2021 | BloodRayne Betrayal: Fresh Bites | Kagan | | |
| 2021 | Far Cry 6 | Pagan Min | | |
| 2021 | Lone Echo II | Jack / Echo Two | | |
| 2022 | Metal: Hellsinger | Paz | | |
| 2022 | God of War Ragnarök | Bitter Squirrel | | |
| 2023 | Stray Gods: The Roleplaying Musical | Apollo | | |
| 2023 | Fort Solis | Wyatt Taylor | Also motion capture | |
| 2023 | Mortal Kombat: Onslaught | Shinnok | | |
| 2024 | Batman: Arkham Shadow | Harvey Dent / Two-Face, Joker, Sal Maroni | | |
| 2024 | Indiana Jones and the Great Circle | Indiana Jones | Also motion capture | |
| 2024 | Marvel Rivals | Loki | | |
| 2025 | Date Everything! | Kristof | | |
| 2025 | Death Stranding 2: On the Beach | Higgs Monaghan | Also motion capture | |
| 2026 | Screamer | Mr. A | | |
| 2026 | Mouse: P.I. for Hire | Jack Pepper | | |
| 2026 | Unhinged | Ben | | |
| 2026 | Marvel's Wolverine | Nathaniel Essex | Also motion capture | |
| TBA | Intergalactic: The Heretic Prophet | | | |

=== Other ===
| Year | Title | Role | Notes | Ref. |
|---|---|---|---|---|
| 2005–07 | Race Car Driver | Narrator, Announcer | | |
| 2015 | Halo 5: Guardians: Hunt the Truth | Anthony Petrosky | | |
| 2015 | Titansgrave: The Ashes of Valkana | Opening Intro Voice Over | | |
| 2015 | Justice League: Battle for Metropolis | The Joker | | |
| 2020 | DC FanDome | Himself | | |
| 2020 | Fungeons & Flagons | Voldred | 2 episodes | |
| 2023 | War Thunder: "Air Superiority" Update Trailer | Narrator | | |
| 2025 | Radiant Black: The Audiobook | Guy / Shift | | |

=== Live-action ===
| Year | Title | Role | Notes | Ref. |
|---|---|---|---|---|
| 2006 | Striking Range | Brice Billings | | |
| 2008 | Comanche Moon | Pea Eye Parker | Miniseries | |
| 2008 | The Imposter | Jerome | Also producer | |
| 2013 | Shelf Life | The Boyfriend | Episode: "Night Terrors" | |
| 2016 | The Phoenix Incident | Ryan Stone | | |
| 2023 | The Last of Us | James | Episode: "When We Are in Need" | |
| 2026 | Iron Lung | David | | |

== Discography ==
=== Studio albums ===
- Random Thoughts on a Paper Napkin (2004, with Tripp Fontaine)
- Sitting in the Fire (2014, solo)
- Moving Around Bias (2017, with Window to the Abbey)

=== Singles ===
- "Burning Out" (2004, with Tripp Fontaine)
- "My Religion" (2013, solo)
- "Merry Christmas" (2015, solo)
- "Water into Wine" (2017, with Window to the Abbey)
- "The Promise" (2017, with Window to the Abbey)
- "Breathe" (2020, with Window to the Abbey)

=== Video game performances ===
- "Will the Circle Be Unbroken?" (with Courtnee Draper) in BioShock Infinite (2013)
- "Cold, Cold Heart" in the Batman: Arkham Origins DLC of the same name (2013)
- "Happy Birthday: Congratulations" in Metal Gear Solid V: The Phantom Pain (2015)
- "Wayfaring Stranger" (with Ashley Johnson) and "Future Days" in The Last of Us Part II (2020)
- "Fade" with Mary Elizabeth McGlynn in The Medium (2021)

== Awards and nominations ==
| Year | Award | Nominated work | Result | Ref. |
|---|---|---|---|---|
| 2011 | NAVGTR Award for Lead Performance in a Drama | Vincent Brooks in Catherine | Nominated | |
| 2012 | BTVA Voice Acting Award for Voice Actor of the Year | Himself | Nominated | |
| 2012 | BTVA Anime Dub Award for Voice Actor for the Year | Himself | Nominated | |
| 2012 | BTVA Anime Dub Award for Best Male Lead Vocal Performance in an Anime Movie/Special | Yuri Lowell in Tales of Vesperia: The First Strike | Nominated | |
| 2013 | NAVGTR Award for Lead Performance in a Drama | Joel in The Last of Us | Won | |
| 2013 | VGX Award for Best Voice Actor | Joel in The Last of Us | Won | |
| 2013 | VGX Award for Best Voice Actor | Booker DeWitt in BioShock Infinite | Nominated | |
| 2013 | VGX Award for Best Song in a Game | "Will the Circle Be Unbroken" (ft. Courtnee Draper) | Won | |
| 2013 | New York Videogame Critics Circle Award for Best Overall Acting | Joel in The Last of Us | Nominated | |
| 2013 | BTVA Voice Acting Award for Voice Actor of the Year | Himself | Won | |
| 2013 | BTVA Voice Acting Award for Best Male Vocal Performance in a Video Game | The Joker in Batman: Arkham Origins | Nominated | |
| 2013 | BTVA Voice Acting Award for Best Male Vocal Performance in a Video Game | Joel in The Last of Us | Nominated | |
| 2014 | D.I.C.E. Award for Outstanding Character Performance | Joel in The Last of Us | Nominated | |
| 2014 | BAFTA Games Award for Performer | Joel in The Last of Us | Nominated | |
| 2014 | The Game Award for Best Performance | Talion in Middle-earth: Shadow of Mordor | Nominated | |
| 2014 | NAVGTR Award for Lead Performance in a Drama | Delsin Rowe in Infamous Second Son | Nominated | |
| 2015 | NAVGTR Award for Lead Performance in a Comedy | Rhys in Tales from the Borderlands | Won | |
| 2015 | D.I.C.E. Award for Outstanding Achievement in Character | Pagan Min in Far Cry 4 | Nominated | |
| 2015 | D.I.C.E. Award for Outstanding Achievement in Character | Delsin Rowe in Infamous Second Son | Nominated | |
| 2015 | D.I.C.E. Award for Outstanding Achievement in Character | Talion in Middle-earth: Shadow of Mordor | Won | |
| 2015 | BAFTA Games Award for Performer | Pagan Min in Far Cry 4 | Nominated | |
| 2017 | BAFTA Games Award for Performer | Sam Drake in Uncharted 4: A Thief's End | Nominated | |
| 2020 | BAFTA Games Award for Performer in a Supporting Role | Higgs Monaghan in Death Stranding | Nominated | |
| 2021 | BAFTA Games Award for Performer in a Supporting Role | Joel in The Last of Us Part II | Nominated | |
| 2025 | New York Game Award for Acting in a Game | Indiana Jones in Indiana Jones and the Great Circle | Won | |
| 2025 | D.I.C.E. Award for Outstanding Achievement in Character | Indiana Jones in Indiana Jones and the Great Circle | Won | |
| 2025 | The Game Award for Best Performance | Indiana Jones in Indiana Jones and the Great Circle | Nominated | |
| 2026 | BAFTA Games Award for Performer in a Leading Role | Indiana Jones in Indiana Jones and the Great Circle | Nominated | |
| 2026 | BAFTA Games Award for Performer in a Supporting Role | Higgs Monaghan in Death Stranding 2: On the Beach | Nominated | |
