= Osamu Saka =

Japanese voice actor (born 1930)

- 阪 脩
- Born: November 7, 1930 (age 95); Osaka, Osaka Prefecture, Japan
- Occupations: Actor; voice actor
- Years active: 1950–present
- Agent: Aoni Production
- Spouse: Yoshiko Ōta (died 2021)
- Website: Official profile

Osamu Saka (阪 脩, Saka Osamu; born November 7, 1930) is a Japanese actor and voice actor affiliated with Aoni Production. He was married to voice actress Yoshiko Ōta until her death in 2021.

== Filmography ==
=== Television animation ===
List of voice performances in television animation
Year	Title	Role	Notes	Source
1963	Gigantor	Gavan		
1969	Kamui the Ninja	Sukumi		
1971	Andersen Stories	Jens' Father, King Neptune	Jens' Father in eps. 25–26, King Neptune in eps. 31–32	
1974	Space Battleship Yamato	Goer		
1975	La Seine no Hoshi	Louis XVI		
1982	The Super Dimension Fortress Macross	Admiral Takashi Hayase		
1985	Lupin the 3rd Part III	Geran	ep 31	
1986	Doraemon	Otonosama		
1987	Dragon Ball	Grandpa Son Gohan		
1987	Little Women	Frederick March		
1987	The Wonderful Wizard of Oz	Nome King	eps. 45-52	
1989	Patlabor	Seitaro Sakaki		
1991	Anime Himitsu no Hanazono	Clevin/Craven		
1992	Sailor Moon	Sakiko's Father, Old Man Owner, Edwards	Sakiko's Father in ep. 20, Old Man Owner in ep. 71, Edwards in ep. 108	
1997	In the Beginning: The Bible Stories	Aaron		
1997	Ehrgeiz	Balzak		
1998	Cardcaptor Sakura	Masaki Amamiya	Sakura's great-grandfather	
1999	The Big O	Sven Marisky	ep. 3	
2001	Chance Pop Session	Sho Kaibara		
2002–05	Ghost in the Shell: Stand Alone Complex	Daisuke Aramaki		
2002	One Piece	Zenny	eps. 136-138	
2004	Monster	BKA Chief	ep. 14	
2006	Black Jack	Dr. Jotaro Honma		
2007	Skull Man	Gōzō Kuroshio		
2008	Golgo 13	Captain	ep. 15	
2011	Blade	Noah van Helsing		
2013	Sword Art Online	Leviathan		
2014	Knights of Sidonia	Shinsuke Tanba		
2014	Marvel Disk Wars: The Avengers	Charles Xavier / Professor X		
2014	Tokyo ESP	Prime Minister	ep. 11	
2016	Pandora in the Crimson Shell: Ghost Urn	Poseidon	ep. 12	
2018	Cardcaptor Sakura: Clear Card	Masaki Amamiya		

=== Theatrical animation ===
List of voice performances in theatrical animation
Year	Title	Role	Notes	Source
1979	The Castle of Cagliostro	British Delegate		
1989	Patlabor: The Movie	Seitaro Sakaki		
1991	Doraemon: Nobita's Dorabian Nights	Shinto Paddo		
1992	Porco Rosso	Sky Bandit		
1993	Ninja Scroll	Toyotomi Envoy		
1993	Patlabor 2: The Movie	Seitaro Sakaki		
1995	Memories	Kamata		
1995	Slayers The Motion Picture	Rowdy Gabriev		
1998	Doraemon: Nobita's Great Adventure in the South Seas	Captain Colt		
2004	Doraemon: Nobita in the Wan-Nyan Spacetime Odyssey	Old Ichi		
2004	Steamboy	The Admiral		

=== Original video animation (OVA) ===
List of voice performances in original video animation
Year	Title	Role	Notes	Source
1988	Legend of the Galactic Heroes	Kaiser Friedrich IV		
1989	Ariel	Dr. Kishida		
1990	Record of Lodoss War	King Fahn		
1991	Mobile Suit Gundam 0083: Stardust Memory	Marneri		
1991–92	3×3 Eyes	Professor Fujii		
1995	The Silent Service	Toshio Takegami		
1996	Fire Emblem	Vector		
1998	Ninja Resurrection	Miyamoto Musashi		
2005	Ghost in the Shell: Stand Alone Complex – The Laughing Man	Daisuke Aramaki		
2006	Ghost in the Shell: S.A.C. 2nd GIG – Individual Eleven	Daisuke Aramaki		
2006	Hellsing Ultimate 1	Father Rinaldo		
2008	My-Otome 0~S.ifr~	John Smith		

=== Original net animation (ONA) ===
List of voice performances in original net animation
Year	Title	Role	Notes	Source
2020	Ghost in the Shell: SAC 2045	Daisuke Aramaki		

=== Video games ===
Year	Title	Role	Console	Source
1995	Double Dragon (Neo Geo)	Koga Shuko	Neo Geo, Neo Geo CD, PlayStation	
1996	Policenauts	Gatse Becker	PC-9821, 3DO, PlayStation, Sega Saturn	
1999	Dead or Alive 2	Tengu	Arcade, Dreamcast, PlayStation 2	
2000	Kessen	Kanbei Kuroda	PlayStation 2, PlayStation Network	
2000	Grandia II	Zera	Dreamcast, PlayStation 2, Microsoft Windows, PlayStation Network, Nintendo Switch	
2001	Metal Gear Solid 2: Sons of Liberty	Colonel Sergei Gurlukovich	PlayStation 2	
2003	Anubis: Zone of Enders	Lloyd	PlayStation 2, PlayStation 3 (HD), Xbox 360 (HD), Microsoft Windows, PlayStation 4	
2004	Ninja Gaiden	Narrator	Xbox, PlayStation 3, PlayStation Vita	
2004	Metal Gear Solid 3: Snake Eater	The End	PlayStation 2, PlayStation 3, Xbox 360, PlayStation Vita	
2006	Xenosaga Episode II: Jenseits von Gut und Böse	Dr. Dimitri Yuriev	PlayStation 2	
2010	Metal Gear Solid: Peace Walker	The End	PlayStation Portable, PlayStation 3 (HD), Xbox 360 (HD)	
2011	Dead or Alive: Dimensions	Tengu, Omega	Nintendo 3DS	
2015	Metal Gear Solid V: The Phantom Pain	Code Talker	Microsoft Windows, PlayStation 3, PlayStation 4, Xbox 360, Xbox One	
2016	Detective Pikachu	John Waals	Nintendo 3DS	

=== Tokusatsu ===
- The Return of Ultraman (1971) Alien Baltan Jr. (ep. 41), Alien Stora (ep. 42), Alien Bat (ep. 51)
- Kamen Rider (1971) Bearconger (ep. 46)
- Mirrorman (1971) Invader of Ep. 48
- Kamen Rider vs. Shocker (1972) Rebirth Mograng, Rebirth Monsters
- Ultraman Ace (1972) Zoffy of Ep. 5/35, Undergroundmon (ep. 29), Ultraseven of Ep. 31
- Henshin Ninja Arashi (1972) Franken (ep. 21 & 24)
- Fireman (1973) Planet Metlor Telecommunications equipment
- Henshin! Ponpoko Dama (1973) PekePeke
- Kure Kure Takora (1973) Narration, Debura, Biragon, The Sea Cucumber Gang
- Kamen Rider X (1974) G.O.D. General Commander (eps. 1 – 21)
- Kamen Rider Amazon (1974) Ruler of Garanda Empire (Real Great Emperor Zero) (eps. 23 & 24)
- Choujin Bibyun (1976) Matsubo (ep. 9)
- Space Ironman Kyodain (1976) Robon Foot 1 (ep. 18 & 19)
- The War in Space (1977) Dr. Schmitt (Actor: William Ross)

=== Dubbing roles ===
==== Live-action ====
- John Cleese
  - A Fish Called Wanda – Archie Leach
  - Fierce Creatures – Rollo Lee
  - The Out-of-Towners – Mr. Mersault
  - The Pink Panther 2 – Chief Inspector Charles Dreyfus
- Anthony Hopkins
  - Juggernaut – Superintendent John McLeod
  - Freejack – Ian McCandless
  - Hearts in Atlantis – Ted Brautigan
- Richard Crenna
  - First Blood (1993 Fuji TV edition) – Colonel Sam Trautman
  - Rambo: First Blood Part II (1993 Fuji TV edition) – Colonel Samuel Trautman
  - Hot Shots! Part Deux – Colonel Denton Walters
- 12 Angry Men (1974 NTV edition) – Juror #5 (Jack Klugman)
- Above the Law (1993 TV Asahi edition) – Kurt Zagon (Henry Silva)
- Addams Family Values – Gomez Addams (Raul Julia)
- Airport '77 – Martin Wallace (Christopher Lee)
- Along Came a Spider – Alex Cross (Morgan Freeman)
- Amadeus – Baron van Swieten (Jonathan Moore)
- The American President – Senator Bob Rumson (Richard Dreyfuss)
- Asteroid (1997 TV Asahi edition) – Dr. Charles Napier (Anthony Zerbe)
- Batman – Carl Grissom (Jack Palance)
- Batman Begins (2008 Fuji TV edition) – Lucius Fox (Morgan Freeman)
- The Bodyguard – Bill Devaney (Bill Cobbs)
- Broken Arrow – Pritchett (Bob Gunton)
- City of Angels – Nathaniel Messinger (Dennis Franz)
- Commando (1989 TV Asashi edition) – Gen. Franklin Kirby (James Olson)
- Darkness – Albert Rua (Giancarlo Giannini)
- Die Hard (1990 TV Asashi edition) – Joseph Yoshinobu Takagi (James Shigeta)
- Dr. Quinn, Medicine Woman – Loren Bray (Orson Bean)
- Dynasty – Blake Carrington (John Forsythe)
- EDtv – Al (Martin Landau)
- Erin Brockovich – Edward L. Masry (Albert Finney)
- The Fifth Element (1999 NTV edition) – General Munro (Brion James)
- Holy Man – John McBainbridge (Robert Loggia)
- Home Alone (1998 TV Asashi edition) – Marley (Roberts Blossom)
- Inside Man – Arthur Case (Christopher Plummer)
- Intersection – Neal (Martin Landau)
- JFK (1994 TV Asashi edition) – Jack Martin (Jack Lemmon)
- Judge Dredd – Chief Justice Fargo (Max von Sydow)
- Miami Rhapsody – Vic Marcus (Paul Mazursky)
- Midnight in the Garden of Good and Evil – Sonny Seiler (Jack Thompson)
- Miller's Crossing – Leo O'Bannon (Albert Finney)
- Mimic – Manny (Giancarlo Giannini)
- Miss Congeniality – Stan Fields (William Shatner)
- Miss Congeniality 2: Armed and Fabulous – Stan Fields (William Shatner)
- Moby Dick (1984 TBS edition) – Starbuck (Leo Genn)
- My Best Friend's Wedding – Walter Wallace (Philip Bosco)
- The NeverEnding Story – Carl Conrad Coreander (Thomas Hill)
- The NeverEnding Story (1987 TV Asahi edition) – Mr. Bux (Gerald McRaney)
- Paper Moon – Floyd (Burton Gilliam)
- Raiders of the Lost Ark (1985 Nippon TV edition) – Colonel Hermann Dietrich (Wolf Kahler)
- Remo Williams: The Adventure Begins – General Scott Watson (George Coe)
- Rise of the Planet of the Apes – Charles Rodman (John Lithgow)
- The Rookie (1993 TBS edition) – Ulrich Sigmund Strom (Raul Julia)
- The Rose – Rudge Campbell (Alan Bates)
- seaQuest DSV – Captain Nathan Hale Bridger (Roy Scheider)
- She-Wolf of London – Rev. Parfray (John Carlin)
- The Shining – Stuart Ullman (Barry Nelson)
- Sliver – Alex Parsons (Martin Landau)
- Star Wars: Episode I – The Phantom Menace – Sio Bibble (Oliver Ford Davies)
- Star Wars: Episode II – Attack of the Clones – Sio Bibble (Oliver Ford Davies)
- The Terminator (1987 TV Asashi edition) – Dr. Silberman (Earl Boen)
- Terminator 2: Judgment Day (1993 Fuji TV edition) – Dr. Silberman (Earl Boen)
- They Live (1990 TV Asahi edition) – Street Preacher (Raymond St. Jacques)
- Twilight – Raymond Hope (James Garner)
- Valdez Is Coming – Frank Tanner (Jon Cypher)
- Wall Street – Lynch (James Karen)
- West Side Story (1979 TBS edition) – Glad Hand (John Astin)
- Who Is Killing the Great Chefs of Europe? – Louis Kohner (Jean-Pierre Cassel)
- Who's Afraid of Virginia Woolf? – George (Richard Burton)
- Year of the Dragon (1988 TBS edition) – Louis Bukowski (Raymond J. Barry)
- X-Men – Erik Lehnsherr / Magneto (Ian McKellen)

==== Animation ====
- Atlantis: The Lost Empire – Preston B. Whitmore
- Atlantis: Milo's Return – Preston B. Whitmore
- Batman: The Animated Series – Daniel Mockridge
- The Fox and the Hound – Chief
- G.I. Joe: A Real American Hero – Hawk
- Home on the Range – Sheriff Sam Brown
- One Hundred and One Dalmatians – Sgt. Tibs
- Peter Pan – George Darling
- Star Trek: The Animated Series – Spock
- SWAT Kats: The Radical Squadron – Tiger Conklin
- The Transformers – G1, Wheeljack, Skyfire, Beachcomber, Swindle, Kup, Metroplex, Alpha Trion, and others
- The Transformers: The Movie – Kup and Ramjet
- Code Lyoko – Franz Hopper
