= Kōsei Ono (comics researcher) =

Japanese translator and film critic

Kōsei Ono (小野 耕世, Ono Kōsei; born November 28, 1939) is a Japanese film critic, cartoon critic, comic translator and overseas comic / animation researcher. Ono is the leading authority on the publication, research and introduction of overseas comics (gaikoku manga) in Japan. From 1963 to 1974 he worked for NHK. He is a visiting professor in the Asia Department of Kokushikan University, a board member of the Japan Society for Studies in Manga and Comic Art, and a member of ASIFA JAPAN, the Japan Cartoonists Association, and the Japan Science Fiction Writer's Club.

== Life ==
Ono was born in Setagaya, Tokyo. His father was the mangaka Saseo Ono. He graduated from the International Christian University of Tokyo in 1963.

In 1968, invited by Osamu Tezuka, Ono wrote a column for COM magazine, “Introduction to Overseas Manga" (海外まんが紹介, Kaigai manga shōkai), presenting foreign (especially American) comics titles to Japanese readers. In 1970 he partnered with Ryoichi Ikegami on writing the manga adaptation of Spider-Man for Shonen Magazine. Ono wrote a number of books about comics, such as The World Image of Donald Duck (ドナルド・ダックの世界像―ディズニーにみるアメリカの夢) and American Comics Encyclopedia (アメリカン・コミックス大全), and has translated several American comic book and graphic novel titles to Japanese, such as Art Speigelman's Maus, Winsor McCay's Little Nemo in Slumberland, Jeff Smith's Bone and Joe Sacco's Palestine.

The character Kosei Ono in Shogun Warriors is named after him. He was visiting Marvel's NY offices while it was being produced and they decided to honor him with the character name.

In 2006, Ono was awarded the 10th Tezuka Osamu Cultural Prize Special Award.
