= Noah van Helsing =

Publication information
- Publisher: Marvel Comics
- First appearance: The Tomb of Dracula Vol. 4 #1 (2004)
- Created by: Bruce Jones; Robert Rodi

In-story information
- Alter ego: Noah Tremayne
- Team affiliations: Blade
- Abilities: Genius-level intellect

Noah van Helsing is a fictional character appearing in American comic books published by Marvel Comics. He is a supporting character of Blade.

== Publication history ==
Noah van Helsing first appeared in The Tomb of Dracula Vol. 4 #1 and was created by Bruce Jones and Robert Rodi.

== Fictional character biography ==
Noah van Helsing is a descendant of Abraham Van Helsing and a distant relative of Rachel van Helsing. He created a team of vampire hunters with the task of killing Dracula. One of those recruits is Blade. Blade ends up training with Noah van Helsing and his team of vampire hunters. Following a tale that revolved around a vampire lord named Vernae forcing a mystic named Aamshed into performing a ritual that can turn a vampire lord into a god, Noah states that Dracula plans to do the same thing and suggest they plant a small nuclear detonator into Dracula's crypt. While making their way to Dracula's crypt, the group is ambushed by Dracula's vampires. Following the vampire attack, Noah tells Blade that another part of Dracula's metamorphosis would have Dracula requiring a human woman so that there would be a new breed of daytime vampires. Noah van Helsing is later abducted by the Yiki Onnas and taken to Dracula's castle. At Dracula's headquarters, it is revealed that Noah van Helsing's real name is Noah Tremayne and that he is the only Van Helsing in name and not in blood. The vampire generals then swiftly kill Noah van Helsing.

== Powers and Abilities ==
Noah van Helsing has genius-level intellect in which he has a good knowledge of vampires.

== In other media ==
=== Television ===
- Noah van Helsing appears in Marvel Anime: Blade voiced by Osamu Saka in the Japanese version and by Troy Baker in the English dub. In a flashback, it was shown that Noah van Helsing had his first encounter with Blade after he helped him save a girl from Baron Howard and his fellow vampires. The next day, Noah van Helsing discovered that Blade wasn't harmed by sunlight. Noah mentioned to Blade that he is a vampire hunter as Blade revealed that he has been having blood cravings. Blade mentioned that he has been looking for a vampire with four fangs. Noah van Helsing revealed a prototype of the Retro Virus made from the ashes of vampires which causes anyone in his experiments to turn to ashes. Noah decided to test the Retro Virus on Blade since his human DNA had found a way to co-exist with his vampire DNA. Noah stated that if it worked on Blade, he will have to decide what he would do with his second chance at life. The next day, it is shown that Blade had survived the Retro Virus with no blood cravings. Blade then asked for Noah van Helsing to train him how to fight vampires. In the present, Blade runs into Noah van Helsing and his dog Razor as Noah tells him that Deacon Frost is in the Philippines. They take a boat operated by Captain MacRae in order to get to the Philippines. When Makoto tries to attack Blade, Noah manages to knock down Makoto as Razor licks Makoto. Noah passes Makoto off as a boy. While on the ride to the Philippines, Noah gives Blade a medicine that would help with his condition. Later that night, Makoto tries to slay Blade in his sleep only for Blade to awaken and Noah to remove Makoto from the room. Noah explains to Makoto that Blade is a daywalker vampire and recaps his history with Blade. After Makoto learned of Blade's history, the boat is then attacked by a flock of Mandurugos led by Matthes. Although Blade fends off Matthes causing the Mandurugos to retreat, one of the Mandurugos snatches Noah at the last minute as Blade tells Captain MacRae to continue the course to the Philippines. Noah is then seen tied up in Matthes' mansion when Matthes gets word that Blade is at the slave ship docks. While Matthes leads the Mandurugos to go attack Blade, Makoto and Razor raid Matthes' mansion and rescues Noah. The next morning, Noah van Helsing thanks Blade for saving him and states that he is getting too old for vampire hunting. Noah tells Blade that he heard Matthes stating in a conversation that Deacon Frost has an underground hideout on a remote island. Noah tells Makoto to take Razor and help Blade fight Deacon Frost. In "Eternal Apocalypse," it was revealed that Noah van Helsing was friends with a swordmaster named Tanba Yagyu who trained Blade and the mutant Kikyo Mikage in sword combat. In "Partner," Noah van Helsing arrived in Cambodia to rescue Blade from the Existence facility that Blade is held in. When he finds that Makoto has been bitten by Deacon Frost, Noah stated that he didn't make it in time. After Makoto dies, Noah van Helsing accompanies Blade to the vampire city of Armarot (which is hidden deep within the Golden Triangle) in order to defeat Deacon Frost once and for all. During the battle, Noah van Helsing surveys the battlefield as he detonates the Existence's arsenal. Noah van Helsing and Razor then fight their way towards the blood source as he is targeted by the Mandurugos and the Manananggals until Razor saves him. Noah van Helsing then drops the water used by Agus into Armarot's blood supplies. Following the death of Deacon Frost and the destruction of Armarot, Noah van Helsing tells a truck driver that there is no sign of Blade. Razor barks at Blade's arrival as Noah van Helsing tells Blade that he knew Blade would come through. When Noah van Helsing asks Blade what he'll be doing now that Deacon Frost is gone, Blade vows to continue his quest of exterminating every vampire in the world.
