= Wong-Chu =

- Wong-Chu as depicted in All-New Iron Man Manual #1 (May 2008). Art by Carlo Pagulayan.

Publication information
- Publisher: Marvel Comics
- First appearance: Tales of Suspense #39 (March 1963)
- Created by: Larry Lieber; Jack Kirby; Don Heck

In-story information
- Species: Human
- Abilities: Expert martial artist

Wong-Chu is a supervillain appearing in American comic books published by Marvel Comics. He usually appears as an adversary of Iron Man, playing a key role in his origin and being the first villain he faced.

== Publication history ==
Wong-Chu first appeared in Tales of Suspense #39 (March 1963), and was created by writer Larry Lieber and artists Jack Kirby and Don Heck.

== Fictional character biography ==
Wong-Chu once served as a commander for the Vietnamese congress during the Vietnam War (later retconned to be the fictitious Siancong War). When a reckless American contingent triggers a booby trap in the Vietnamese jungles while testing a new weapon, one of Wong-Chu's commanders found a survivor in the form of Tony Stark. Wong-Chu learns that Stark has shrapnel lodged in his heart that will kill him within a week. Wong-Chu tries to capitalize on this by telling Stark that he is dying and that, if he creates a powerful new weapon for him, then his surgeons will save him. Realizing that Wong-Chu is lying, Stark pretends to comply with him. Using materials supplied by Wong-Chu, Stark and Ho Yinsen build a suit of powered armor. Yinsen distracts the guards long enough to give Iron Man time to charge his armor. Wong-Chu kills Yinsen as Stark finishes charging his armor, but fails to notice that Stark has escaped and is hiding on the ceiling. Wong-Chu attempts to escape from Iron Man, only to be killed in an ammo dump explosion.

Years later, it is revealed that Wong-Chu survived the explosion (albeit heavily scarred on the left side of his body) and that Yinsen's brain was preserved alive, salvaged by the interdimensional merchant Doctor Midas. Before Wong-Chu can claim Yinsen's brain, Iron Man helps the Sons of Yinsen defeat Wong-Chu, who is decapitated and killed by one of the Sons.

== Powers and abilities ==
Wong-Chu possesses no super-human powers, but is a highly skilled martial artist, particularly in wrestling.

== In other media ==
- A character inspired by Wong-Chu named Righella appears in a flashback in the Marvel Anime: Iron Man episode "A Twist of Memory, a Turn of the Mind", voiced by Seiji Sasaki in the original Japanese version and by Vic Mignogna in the English dub.
- Wong-Chu appears in The Invincible Iron Man, voiced by James Sie. This version is the commander of the Jade Dragons, a guerrilla force dedicated to stopping the Mandarin's resurrection, before being killed by his protégé Li Mei.
