= List of Marvel Comics characters: Y =

== Y'Garon ==
Y'Garon is a demon who has clashed with Marada the She-Wolf and Dracula.

== Yandroth ==
Yandroth is the humanoid Scientist Supreme of the otherdimensional planet Yann and a would-be-conqueror who, with his robot Voltorg, has fought Doctor Strange as a counterpart to the latter's title of Sorcerer Supreme. Yandroth was the first villain faced by the Defenders - Doctor Strange, Namor, and the Hulk.

Yandroth summons a group of villains and sends them to attack heroes worldwide, giving himself enough power to summon the Ravagers of Creation. Four elemental creatures confront the Defenders, who are unable to stop them individually. They attack the Stone creature, disabling the spell needed to destroy the world and killing Yandroth. In his dying breath as the Hulk and Namor fight, Yandroth realizes that the Defenders hate each other. Yandroth uses his powers to curse the four original members, forcing them to work together in times of a severe crisis. When the four Defenders members became The Order for a short time, their curse resurrects Yandroth.

== Yang Yi ==
Yang Yi is a character appearing in American comics published by Marvel Comics. The character was created by writer Alyssa Wong and artist Michael YG, and first appeared in Iron Fist vol. 6 #2 (March 2022).

== Yeti ==
Yeti is the name of several characters in Marvel Comics.

=== Inhuman ===
Yeti was created by Stan Lee and Jack Kirby and first appeared in Fantastic Four #99.

Yeti is an Inhuman resembling his namesake. The character joins the superhero team First Line, but leaves after losing control during a fight, and lives in a temple in the Himalayas for a period. While looking for Crystal, the Human Torch encounters Yeti and, startled by his appearance, attacks him. Yeti runs from the Torch's attack and tells the other Inhumans that they are under attack.

=== Weapon P.R.I.M.E. ===
This Yeti is a member of the covert Canadian superhuman group Weapon P.R.I.M.E., and has fought X-Force and Alpha Flight member Northstar. He has superhuman strength, claws, and an enhanced healing factor.

== Ho Yinsen ==
Ho Yinsen

Publication information
- Publisher: Marvel Comics
- First appearance: Tales of Suspense #39 (March 1963)
- Created by: Stan Lee (writer); Larry Lieber (scripter); Don Heck (artist)

In-story information
- Supporting character of: Iron Man
- Abilities: Genius-level intelligence

Professor Ho Yinsen is a supporting character of Iron Man in the Marvel Comics universe. The character, created by Stan Lee, Larry Lieber and Don Heck, first appeared in Tales of Suspense #39 (March 1963).

Ho Yinsen was a physicist, engineer and pacifist from the fictional nation of Timbetpal. Yinsen was captured in Vietnam by Wong-Chu before Tony Stark was also captured. Stark's US military convoy had tripped a land mine and he was injured with shrapnel that was slowly moving toward his heart. Yinsen builds a magnetic chest plate and affixes it to Stark's chest, preventing the shrapnel from reaching his heart. Wong-Chu then orders Yinsen and Stark to build weapons for him. Instead, Yinsen helps Stark secretly build the first Iron Man armor, which includes a device for Stark's heart to keep him alive. Yinsen sacrifices his life distracting Wong-Chu to buy time for Stark to power up his armor.

Twelve of Wong-Chu's former prisoners were disciples of Yinsen; one of these disciples (Sun-Tao) leads them to establish a quasi-religious cult called the Sons of Yinsen.

=== Ho Yinsen in other media ===
- A character based on Ho Yinsen named Wellington Yinsen appears in Iron Man (1994), voiced by Neil Ross. This version worked with Professor Arnold Brock before the latter became the Mandarin, who captured Yinsen and Tony Stark to build armor for his henchmen. After Yinsen builds armor for Stark so he can escape, he sacrifices himself to save him from the Mandarin.
- Ho Yinsen appears in Marvel Anime: Iron Man, voiced by Hiroaki Hirata in the Japanese version and by Kyle Hebert in the English dub. Similarly to the Iron Man (2008) incarnation (see below), this version built an electromagnet to keep Tony Stark alive. After helping Stark escape, Yinsen survived upon being found and nursed back to health by a woman named Shelha. After Stark helicopters attacked where he and Shelha were living in, Yinsen was convinced by Japan's Minister of Defense Kuroda to join Zodiac. Yinsen has a change of heart, but Kuroda kills him with the Iron Man Sigma armors in retaliation.
- Ho Yinsen makes non-speaking appearances in the second season of Iron Man: Armored Adventures as an old friend of Howard Stark and a Stark International medical specialist who saved Tony Stark after he was injured in a plane crash and created his artificial heart.
- A character based on Ho Yinsen named Ho Yen appears in The Invincible Iron Man, voiced by an uncredited actor. After being captured for attempting to dig up an ancient city, he helps James "Rhodey" Rhodes treat Tony Stark's damaged heart and relates the legend of the Mandarin to them before being killed by Wong-Chu.
- Ho Yinsen appears in the Marvel Cinematic Universe (MCU) film, portrayed by Shaun Toub.
  - Yinsen first appears in Iron Man. This version is a doctor and engineer from the fictional Afghanistan village of Gulmira who was captured by a branch of the Ten Rings. After building an electromagnet to save Tony Stark's life, Yinsen assists him in creating a miniaturized arc reactor and the first Iron Man armor before sacrificing himself to buy time for Stark's armor to boot up. Stark tries to save him, but Yinsen reveals that he intended to die to reunite with his dead family and urges Stark to not waste his life.
  - Yinsen makes a cameo appearance in a flashback in Iron Man 3 (2013).
- Ho Yinsen appears in the 2008 Iron Man film tie-in game, voiced by Shaun Toub. Unlike in the film, this version sacrifices himself to prevent the Ten Rings from acquiring Tony Stark's notes on the Iron Man armor and the ammunition that was stored with them.

== Kagenobu Yoshioka ==
- Further reading: Kagenobu Yoshioka at the Comic Book DB (archived from the original); Kagenobu Yoshioka at the Grand Comics Database

Kagenobu Yoshioka is a character in Marvel Comics. The character, created by Akira Yoshida, first appeared in Elektra: The Hand #1 (November 2004). He is a ninja and founder of The Hand. After founding the Hand, Yoshioka falls in love with Eliza Martinez, a foreigner who came to his sensei's school for training. However, Yoshioka learns that the Hand has become a mercenary organization; realizing that his school is slowly getting out of his control, Yoshioka fights and kills Daisuke Sasaki, his old rival. Yoshioka and Eliza fight the Hand's members, which ends with Yoshioka being killed by his once loyal students.

=== Kagenobu Yoshioka in other media ===
Kagenobu Yoshioka, renamed Nobu Yoshioka, appears in Daredevil, portrayed by Peter Shinkoda. This version is a member of the Hand and associate of Wilson Fisk. Throughout the first season, Yoshioka assists the Hand in smuggling a child called "Black Sky", only to be foiled by Matt Murdock and Stick. Angered by this, Yoshioka attacks Murdock, but is defeated and killed. As of the second season, the Hand resurrected Yoshioka, who battles Murdock once more before helping the Hand kidnap Stick. Despite facing opposition from Murdock and Elektra, Yoshioka reveals that Elektra she is the new "Black Sky". After Elektra sacrifices herself to save Murdock, the latter throws Yoshioka off of a building and he is beheaded by Stick so that the Hand cannot resurrect him.

== Yukon Jack ==
- Further reading: Yukon Jack at the Comic Book DB (archived from the original); Yukon Jack at the Grand Comics Database

Yukon Jack (Yukotujakzurjimozoata) is a character in the Marvel Universe, a member of the superhero team Alpha Flight. The character, created by Scott Lobdell and Clayton Henry, first appeared in Alpha Flight (vol. 3) #1 (May 2004).

Yukon Jack is the heir to a secret civilization, Kemteron. Walter Langkowski bribed his father to drug him so he would assist Alpha Flight in saving the original team from a Plodex ship. After the series' conclusion and his time travel adventures, he married Snowbird, but this relationship did not last.

He views himself as a demi-god, making references to not being a normal human. He has the ability to generate his own light and telekinetically control bone projectiles.
