= Spider-Man J =

Japanese manga series

- Cover Of Spider-Man J, Volume 2

スパイダーマン J (Supaidāman J)
- Genre: Superhero
- Manga
- Written by: Yamanaka Akira
- Published by: Kodansha
- English publisher: NA: Marvel Comics
- Magazine: Comic BomBom
- Original run: November 9, 2004 – May 11, 2005

Spider-Man J (Japanese: スパイダーマンJ, Hepburn: Supaidāman J) is a manga by Yamanaka Akira, following the main character, known in all versions as Spider-Man J. It ran in the children's magazine, Comic BomBom, from November 9, 2004, to May 11, 2005. The manga is not connected to Ryoichi Ikegami's Spider-Man: The Manga and takes place in its independent continuity numbered as Earth-7041.

== Plot ==
In the year 200X, a supervillain who goes by the name Lord Beaustius (Lord Gokibu in the Japanese version) wants to steal the fossil of the Insect King, 15 year-old Peter Parker (Kakeru Amano in the Japanese version) uses his new spider powers to become Spider-Man J, to prevent this from happening. During his time as a superhero, he meets Japanese versions of Elektra, Doctor Doom, Blade, and the Fantastic Four.

The story does not provide an extensive introduction to the character like previous Spider-Man series published in Japan did. Daniel Stein, author of "Of Transcreations and Transpacific Adaptations: Investigating Manga Versions of Spider-Man", said that "no reintroduction of Spider-Man through a recap or revision of his origin story was necessary...".

== Characters ==
Kakeru Amano (天野翔, Amano Kakeru; カケル Kakeru) is a boy with the paranormal abilities of a spider. He keeps his identity as Spider-Man J a secret, fearing his family or friends might get hurt. The only person who knows Kakeru is Spider-Man J is Detective Makoto. He specializes in a number of weapons that he creates using his web-shooters. He is shy and clumsy, and barely has any friends. In the English version, he is known as Peter Parker.

- His parents are located in the United States.
- Stein described the Spider-Man J Peter Parker as "a small, preadolescent kid who still sleeps with stuffed animals".

Makoto Jujo (十条 真, Jūjō Makoto) is a detective who became a police officer because he wanted to protect people. He has a goofy sense of humor, but has a good heart and believes in justice. In the English version, he is known as Detective Flynn.

- Stein described Flynn as "a paternal figure less given to emotional outbursts and childish fantasies than [Spider-Man J's] Peter".

Mami Amano (天野真美, Amano Mami) is Kakeru's young, happy go-lucky aunt. She loves Kakeru like he is her own son, and is overprotective of him. She owns her own dress shop. She is quite relaxed, and is known for her spicy curry. In the English version, she is known as Aunt May.

- Stein described the Spider-Man J Aunt May as "a somewhat overbearing mother figure".

Megumi (めぐみ) is Kakeru's classmate and girlfriend. She is a tomboy, and is very careful for everyone, especially Kakeru.

- In the English version, she is known as Jane-Marie, a name based on that of Mary Jane Watson from the American series.
- Stein describes Jane-Marie as "a friend but not yet a potential love interest".

Densuke (デンスケ) is Kakeru's/Spider-Man J Peter's classmate and friend. He is a fan of Spider-Man J and Comic BomBom, judging by his shirt that reads "Bom". In the English version, he is known as Harold.

Lord Gokibu (ゴキブ・リーダー, Gokibu Rīdā) is the main villain of the manga. Not much is known about him, or his past. In the English version, he is known as Lord Beastius.

Elektra

- The Spider-Man J Peter is against forming an alliance with her.

The Spider-Man J Peter/Kakeru has three pets, a cat named Leo (レオ Reo), a bird named Pal (パル Paru), and a dog named Don (ドン), a nod to Toei's Spider-Man Show, where Spider-Man had a giant robot named Leopardon.

There is no Ben Parker-esque character in the story.

== Other appearances ==
During the Spider-Verse crossover, Kakeru Amano is recruited by Peter Parker from Earth-616 along with Mangaverse Spider-Man and Takuya Yamashiro in a battle against Solus and the Inheritors.

== Release ==
The marketing in the United States focused on the manga's country of origin, Japan.

== Reception ==
When the manga came out in Japan, it enjoyed a loyal fanbase of otakus. The response from American fans was mixed.

== Publishing ==
The manga was translated into English in Spider-Man Family, starting in issue #1, volume 2 and has been released also in 2 English sized tankōbon, called "Digests" by Marvel Comics. The first volume was called "Japanese Knights" and the second was called "Japanese Daze".

== See also ==
- Japanese Spider-Man
