= Hulk: The Manga =

Japanese manga

ハルク (Haruku)
- Genre: Superhero
- Manga
- Written by: Kazuo Koike, Yukio Togawa
- Illustrated by: Kosei Saigo, Yoshihiro Morito, Herb Trimpe
- Published by: Kodansha
- Original run: 1970 – 1971

Hulk: The Manga, published simply as Hulk (Japanese: ハルク, Hepburn: Haruku) in Japan, is an original Japanese manga story arc following the Marvel Comics character The Incredible Hulk. It was originally published in Japan in 1970 and 1971 issues of Weekly Bokura Magazine by Kodansha. It was alternately authored by Yukio Togawa and Kazuo Koike, with art by Kosei Saigo and Yoshihiro Morito with ripped art from Herb Trimpe.

Spider-Man also got this treatment, with the Spider-Man stories (primarily by Ryoichi Ikegami) proving quite popular, leading to many reprints over the years. Other attempts were made at crossover properties in the 1990s with X-Men: The Manga being created to follow the storyline of the anime. The Hulk stories were less fortunate, and have never been reprinted or translated since their initial outings. Consequently, very little is known about the series.

Distinctively, these stories were just referred to as Hulk, rather than The Incredible Hulk as with Japanese language international editions of Marvel U.S. stories.

== See also ==
- Spider-Man: The Manga
- X-Men: The Manga
