= Spider-Man: The Manga =

Japanese manga series

- Spider-Man
- The cover of the first volume of the 2002 Bunkoban re-release, published by Media Factory.

スパイダーマン
- Genre: Superhero
- Manga
- Written by: Kōsei Ono; Kazumasa Hirai
- Illustrated by: Ryoichi Ikegami
- Published by: Kodansha
- English publisher: US: Marvel Comics
- Imprint: Sun Comics (Asahi Sonorama)
- Magazine: Monthly Shōnen Magazine
- Original run: January 1970 – September 1971
- Volumes: 8

Spider-Man: The Manga, published simply as Spider-Man (スパイダーマン, Supaidāman) in Japan, is a Japanese superhero manga series written by Kōsei Ono and Kazumasa Hirai and illustrated by Ryoichi Ikegami which retold the story of Spider-Man in a Japanese setting. It was originally published in Japan from January 1970 to September 1971 in Monthly Shōnen Magazine. The comic began by loosely adapting American Marvel stories, but over time, Ikegami introduced more original material. The manga features Yu Komori as Spider-Man's teen alter ego, and takes place in a Japanese setting. Within the Marvel Comics multiverse, its reality is designated as Earth-70019.

== Premise ==
A junior high school student named Yu Komori (小森ユウ, Komori Yuu): A bright and intellectually-gifted, yet outcast and withdrawn teen genius, is bitten by a radioactive spider during a scientific demonstration, which imbues him with spider-like superhuman abilities, like the American Spider-Man's counterpart, Peter Parker. After a tragic mistake committed by accidentally misusing his powers, which results in him unintentionally killing someone, a guilt-ridden Yu is driven to do good and atone for his irresponsibility, under the alias of a masked vigilante: "Spider-Man". Yu faces Japanese versions of villains such as Electro, the Lizard, Mysterio, and the Kangaroo. The series also featured counterparts of Aunt May, named "Mei", and J. Jonah Jameson, who is the publisher of the newspaper publishing company, where Yu is employed as a freelance photographer and which has an anti-Spider-Man stance.

== Publication ==
Initially, Kōsei Ono wrote the stories. On completion of the sixth story, Kazumasa Hirai became the writer. Ikegami continued to provide the art. The first few stories featured analogues to several of Spider-Man's villains and supporting cast, while maintaining an altogether darker, grittier and moodier tone and atmosphere, compared to the original Spider-Man comics. The later Hirai-written stories deviated further from the source material, being more tonally mature, adult-oriented, violent, while including obscene content, such as profanity, sexual and gruesome imagery of a kind not seen in the original American Spider-Man comics. The later stories involved less comedy, were more dramatic, and had more realistic art, reflecting Ikegami's later style. The majority of the manga's stories focused on Yu's struggles with his alter-ego as Spider-Man and his normal life as a high school student. The negative sides and consequences being a super-powered vigilante brings on to his life, along with his character-arc of initially utilizing his powers for solely selfish gain, to using them to do good and for genuinely altruistic reasons, out of a sense of responsibility, despite being constantly tormented by negative emotions and the burden and misery being Spider-Man brings on to him, while also being careful with the use of his spider-powers and controlling his darker side and grim thoughts regarding his life as Spider-Man and struggling with the increasing tension being a masked vigilante brings on to his relationships with his close ones, being extremely similar with the original Stan Lee/Steve Ditko run on the Amazing Spider-Man comics.

The books were reprinted in their original format, with the original Japanese text, in 1974, 1976, 1986, 1996 and 2006. The covers were updated, with the first three reprints to feature a picture of Spider-Man holding a flower. This image was originally a foldout 1971 calendar included with the original monthly printings. A number on a bottom-left of the cover indicated the story arc reprinted within.

The English-language version of the series was reprinted by Marvel Comics across thirty-one issues from December 1997 to April 1999. Eight out of the thirteen Japanese stories in total were fully translated, with several edits to remove some of the violent scenes. The final issue, #31, began the translation of the ninth story and was left incomplete due to the title's cancellation.

== Stories ==
1. "The Birth of Spider-Man" (reprinted in Spider-Man: The Manga #1-3)
2. "The Transformation of Doctor Inumaru" (reprinted in Spider-Man: The Manga #4-6)
3. "Too Strong a Hero" (reprinted in Spider-Man: The Manga #7-9)
4. "The False Spider-Man" (reprinted in Spider-Man: The Manga #10-15)
5. "Yu Under Suspicion" (reprinted in Spider-Man: The Manga #16-18)
6. "Summer of Insanity" (reprinted Spider-Man: The Manga #19-21)
7. "What is My Destination!"
8. "Woman of Winter" (reprinted in Spider-Man: The Manga #22-24)
9. "Strangers" (reprinted in Spider-Man: The Manga #31)
10. "The Mania Demon"
11. "Shadow of Spider-Man" (reprinted in Spider-Man: The Manga #25-30)
12. "Witch of the Golden Eye"
13. "The Woman Who Raises the Tiger"

== Volumes ==
=== Original release (Sun Comics (Asahi Sonorama)) ===
No.	Japanese release date	Japanese ISBN
01	April 30, 1976	—
02	April 30, 1976	—
03	May 20, 1976	—
04	May 30, 1976	—
05	June 10, 1976	—
06	July 20, 1976	—
07	July 30, 1976	—
08	August 25, 1976	—

=== 1986 - 1987 release (Sun Wide Comics (Asahi Sonorama)) ===
No.	Japanese release date	Japanese ISBN
01	December 20, 1986	4-257-96110-4
02	January 20, 1987	4-257-96113-9
03	February 20, 1987	4-257-96116-3
04	March 20, 1987	4-257-96119-8
05	April 20, 1987	4-257-96123-6

=== 1995 - 1996 release (Asahi Sonorama) ===
No.	Japanese release date	Japanese ISBN
01	October 20, 1995	4-257-90252-3
02	October 20, 1995	4-257-90253-1
03	November 15, 1995	4-257-90254-X
04	December 15, 1995	4-257-90255-8
05	January 20, 1996	4-257-90256-6

=== 2002 release (MF Bunko (Media Factory)) ===
No.	Japanese release date	Japanese ISBN
01	May 23, 2002	9784840103565
02	May 23, 2002	9784840105712
03	June 5, 2002	9784840105859
04	June 5, 2002	9784840105866
05	July 5, 2002	9784840105941

=== 2004 release (MF Comics (Media Factory)) ===
No.	Japanese release date	Japanese ISBN
01	June 23, 2004	9784840109550
02	June 23, 2004	9784840109567
03	July 23, 2004	9784840109611
04	July 23, 2004	9784840109628
05	July 23, 2004	9784840109635

== Reception ==
According to Ikegami, the series did not get a popular reception in Japan upon its initial release, and Hirai taking the writing duties only caused the reception to get "picked up a little". Daniel Stein, author of "Of Transcreations and Transpacific Adaptations: Investigating Manga Versions of Spider-Man", citing political and cultural issues, described this reception as "less than stellar".

The reception in the United States upon the release there was described by Stein as "not too successful".

== In other media ==
During the Spider-Verse crossover, Komori is explicitly named as one of "four or five Japanese Spider-Men" taking part in the final battle against Morlun and the Inheritors.

== See also ==
- Hulk: The Manga
- X-Men: The Manga
- Spider-Man J
- Japanese Spider-Man
