= X-Men: The Manga =

Manga

X-Men: The Manga, published simply as X-Men in Japan, is a manga adaptation of the 1992 animated X-Men series. It was published by Takeshobo in 1994 under their Bamboo Comics imprint, directly to the tankobon format, in order to promote the Japanese airing of the show.

It was published from March 1998 to April 1999. The manga lasted 13 volumes, with a different manga artist drawing each story. Each volume adapted two episodes from the TV series, and in total, covered the first 2 seasons of the show.

The first volume of the English adaptation was published in 1998 by Marvel Comics. Marvel adapted the manga into English as a monthly title, publishing 26 issues that covered the first 13 stories. A remastered version was released, beginning publication in November 2024 by VIZ Media.

== Related works ==
In addition to the books, Takeshobo published a manga tie-in to the X-Men: Children of the Atom arcade game. It was drawn by Miyako Cojima and was published in Comic Gamma from 1994 to 1995, but never made it to market as individual books..

== List of volumes (Japanese edition) ==
1. ISBN 978-4884757090
2. ISBN 978-4884757106
3. ISBN 978-4884757304
4. ISBN 978-4884757311
5. ISBN 978-4884757328
6. ISBN 978-4884757380
7. ISBN 978-4884757397
8. ISBN 978-4884757403
9. ISBN 978-4884757410
10. ISBN 978-4884757427
11. ISBN 978-4884757434
12. ISBN 978-4884757441
13. ISBN 978-4884757458

== See also ==
- Del Rey Manga § Marvel
