= Bolt (comics) =

Comics name

Bolt, in comics, may refer to:

- Bolt (DC Comics), a DC Comics supervillain
- Bolt, the alias of Chris Bradley (comics)
- Bolt, another name used by Starbolt
- Bolt, a character from AC Comics
- Bolt, a character from Image Comics who appeared in Capes and Invincible
- Bolt-01, the pen name of Dave Evans, editor of FutureQuake
- Black Bolt, a Marvel Comics superhero and leader of the Inhumans
- Blue Bolt, a Golden Age superhero
- Deadbolt (comics), a Marvel Comics character
- Deathbolt, a DC Comics character
- Dreadbolt, a Teen Titans villain and son of the DC Comics supervillain Bolt
- Silverbolt, a Transformers character
- Skybolt (comics), an alias used by the character better known as Redneck
- Thunderbolt (comics), especially The Thunderbolts

== See also ==
- Bolt (disambiguation)
