= List of Marvel Comics characters: B =

== Baal ==
Baal is the father figure of Apocalypse. Created by Terry Kavanagh and Adam Pollina, the character first appeared in Rise of Apocalypse #1 (August 1996). In ancient Egypt, Baal of the Sandstormers saw En Sabah Nur's potential power and will to survive, believing that only those who are strong enough to survive hardship and direct conflict are worthy of life.

The army of Pharaoh Rama-Tut and General Ozymandias destroy the Sandstormers, but the two are injured and seek refuge in a cave in which Baal reveals the Celestials' advanced technology hidden to his protege before death.

=== Baal in other media ===
- Baal makes a non-speaking appearance in the X-Men: Evolution episode "Dark Horizon".
- Baal appears in the X-Men '97 episode "The Rise of Apocalypse", voiced by Michael Dorn.

== Nakia Bahadir ==
Nakia Bahadir is a Turkish girl and a friend of Kamala Khan. The character was created by G. Willow Wilson and Adrian Alphona, first appearing in the third volume of Ms. Marvel in 2014.

=== Nakia Bahadir in other media ===
Nakia Bahadir appears in Ms. Marvel (2022), portrayed by Yasmeen Fletcher. This version is a student at Coles Academic High School.

== Bakuto ==
- Further reading: Bakuto at the Comic Book DB (archived from the original); Bakuto at the Grand Comics Database

Bakuto is a ninja in Marvel Comics. The character, created by Andy Diggle, Antony Johnston and Marco Checchetto, first appeared in Daredevil #505 (April 2010).

Bakuto, the head Daimyo of South America, meets with the other four Daimyos in Jigoku-Chu Castle in Japan. He shows some doubt in Matt Murdock leading The Hand and especially scoffs at White Tiger's involvement due to her being a woman. Beforehand, Bakuto killed his master, Izanagi, to showcase "[his] strength of will", even going so far as to not allowing him seppuku.

In the present, while having dinner, Bakuto's food is spiked causing him to hallucinate demons. Matt goes to check on him as Daredevil and are both immediately attacked by ninjas that were secretly sent by the other Daimyos. After defeating them, Matt is led to believe that someone is attempting to take Bakuto's life and ups the security. Despite this Bakuto believes that Matt was the one who sent the ninjas and begins plotting to kill him. He is later confronted by a possessed White Tiger and killed in combat.

=== Bakuto in other media ===
Bakuto appears in the Marvel Cinematic Universe series Iron Fist and The Defenders, portrayed by Ramón Rodríguez. This version is one of the leaders of the Hand and Colleen Wing's former sensei.

== Balloon Man ==
Balloon Man (Emilio Helio) is a professor who suffered an accident that caused him to only breathe helium. While mocked by his fellow scientists and discovering that he can control gas, Helio became the criminal Balloon Man, using balloons in his criminal activities. Balloon Man takes control of the balloons at the Thanksgiving Day Parade, where he battles Spider-Boy and Squirrel Girl.

== Balthazar ==
Balthazar or Belathauzer in his first appearance, is a demon who has clashed with the Defenders and Devil-Slayer.

== Martine Bancroft ==
Martine Bancroft is an assistant to Michael Morbius and Emil Nikos, whose experiments aim to cure his blood disease. They backfire and turn him into a vampire-like being. After being manipulated by a cult, Bancroft personally assists in finding resources to cure Morbius' "pseudo-vampirism". She is interrupted and ultimately turned into a similar creature before Morbius and Simon Stroud inject her with the cure. After being killed by David Langford, she is resurrected but becomes possessed by the Lilin Parasite of Lilith's group before being saved by Morbius. Bancroft's original personality returns, albeit now as a true undead vampire, and she even has a friendship with Jack Russell / the Werewolf. After becoming a true undead vampire, Bancroft is destroyed by Morbius while saving Peter Parker / Spider-Man.

=== Powers and abilities of Martine Bancroft ===
Martine possessed the typical powers associated with true undead vampires.

=== Martine Bancroft in other media ===
Martine Bancroft appears in Morbius (2022), portrayed by Adria Arjona. This version is a scientific colleague of Michael Morbius. She personally assists in the experiment that creates his vampiric form and is later killed by Morbius' adoptive brother Milo. Bancroft is revived as a vampiric creature after unintentionally ingesting some of Morbius' blood.

== Banner family ==
=== Elaine Banner ===
Elaine Banner

Publication information
- Publisher: Marvel Comics
- First appearance: The Savage She-Hulk #15 (April 1981)
- Created by: David Kraft (writer); Mike Vosburg (artist)

In-story information
- Full name: Elaine Ann Banner Walters
- Supporting character of: She-Hulk, Hulk
- Notable aliases: Aunt Elaine, Elaine Walters, Mrs Walters

Elaine Banner or Elaine Walters is the sister of Susan Banner and Brian Banner, and the mother of Jennifer Walters. During their childhood, all three of them including their mother were physically and mentally abused by their alcoholic father, Bruce Banner. For years they suffered but eventually they pulled through until Bruce died.

Elaine later married County Sheriff Morris Walters, becoming Elaine Walters, and soon after gave birth to their daughter, Jennifer. A mobster named Nicholas Trask hired a hit on Morris, but the hitmen accidentally targeted Elaine's car, making her death look like a drunk driving incident.

==== Elaine Banner in other media ====
- Elaine Banner appears in The Incredible Hulk episode "Down Memory Lane".
- Elaine Banner appears in She-Hulk: Attorney at Law, portrayed by Tess Kincaid.

=== Rebecca Banner ===
Rebecca Banner (née Drake) is a fictional supporting character appearing in American comic books published by Marvel Comics. She is the wife of Brian Banner, and mother of Bruce Banner. First appearing in Incredible Hulk vol. 2 #267 (January 1982), she was created by Bill Mantlo and Sal Buscema.

Rebecca and Brian Banner had their only child, Bruce, while Brian was working at on a government project in Los Alamos. Brian is abusive to the pair, and eventually kills Rebecca. Brian goes to prison, and is later killed by Bruce when he assaults him at Rebecca's grave.

==== Rebecca Banner in other media ====
Rebecca Banner, renamed Edith Banner, appears in Hulk, portrayed by Cara Buono.

== Bantam ==
Bantam is the name of two characters in Marvel Comics.

=== Bantam (mutant) ===
Bantam is an assistant of Trevor Fitzroy who uses his power as a chronal anchor to keep track of Fitzroy's time portals. When Fitzroy takes over a future timeline and renames himself the Chronomancer, Bantam accompanies him. Bantam realizes that Fitzroy had been driven mad by his dreams of power, and eventually betrays Fitzroy to the rebellion led by Bishop. Bantam assists in the raising of the gate to the Chronomancer's keep, and is killed by Fitzroy's Chronotroopers.

=== Robert Velasquez ===
Robert Velasquez is a boxer who is subjected to the Power Broker's superhuman enhancement treatment and accidentally kills another boxer in the ring. When Aviles, the man who arranged to have him enhanced, shoots him and leaves him for dead, Bantam goes looking for revenge, but Aviles is shot dead by one of his own men. Bantam then goes to avenge one of his friends and attacks Captain America while in a berserk rage, but goes on to aid Captain America once he calms down. Bantam reappears in the storyline Civil War, where he is killed in battle with Thunderclap.

=== Powers and abilities of Bantam ===
The first Bantam is a mutant who possesses sensitivity to the bioenergy emissions of other superhumans. This allowed him to locate and keep track of Trevor Fitzroy's time portals.

The second Bantam possesses superhuman strength, durability, and speed coupled with uncontrollable rage.

=== Bantam in other media ===
The first Bantam appears in the X-Men: The Animated Series episode "One Man's Worth".

== Baphomet ==
Baphomet is a powerful demon and the captain of the royal guard of Satan, who occasionally uses his form as a guise. Through Baphomet's body, Satan uses his cult to lure his son Daimon Hellstrom into a trap in St. Louis, but the Son of Satan defeats the cult and casts Baphomet into Hell. Baphomet was later entrusted by Satan to guard the portal to Hell in Arizona and forms a temporary truce with Hellstrom to prevent the Posessor from accessing it. Although Baphomet is defeated by the Posessor's servant Nightfire, the Posessor is ultimately killed by Hellstrom.

== Eli Bard ==
Eli Bard, originally named Eliphas, lived at the height of the Roman Empire and was an esteemed soldier until a spear injury ended his military career. For a while, Eliphas worked unsuccessfully as a poet until he met Aurelia, one of the most powerful women in Rome. He soon married her and achieved a position in the Senate. As a well-respected senator, Eliphas was known as a skilled orator. His wife left him for a general named Mascius and conspired to give Mascius his seat in the Senate.

Left with nothing, Eliphas was approached by Selene, who offered him immortality in exchange for helping her kill and absorb every soul in Rome. Eliphas drew pentagrams and performed rituals at several locations in the city, but warned a small girl to get her family out. The girl's father alerted the authorities and Eliphas and Selene were captured before the spell could be carried out. Selene cursed Eliphas for his perceived betrayal with an eternal life of torture, turning him into a vampire-like creature.

Eliphas, having at some point in time changed his name to Eli Bard, locates Selene in Nova Roma, where she is worshiped as a god. Still in love with her despite her curse, Bard realizes that he must make an offering to her before approaching her. Bard later joins the Purifiers, an anti-mutant terrorist group. During this time, Bard works diligently to further the Purifiers' goals, secrently intending to sacrifice the Purifiers to gain Selene's attention. Bard eventually changes his plans, intending to resurrect deceased mutants to form an army for Selene. However, Selene eventually turns against Bard, killing him with her knife.

== Baron Samedi ==
- Further reading: Baron Samedi at the Comic Book DB (archived from the original)

Baron Samedi is the name of two characters in Marvel Comics.

=== Rolando Samedi ===
Samedi is a Haitian agent of A.I.M. who creates pseudo-zombies, posing as the real Baron Samedi.

=== Vodou ===
Within Haitian Vodou and related religions, Baron Samedi is one of the Loa.

=== Baron Samedi in other media ===
The Vodou incarnation of Baron Samedi appears in Cloak & Dagger, portrayed by Justin Sams.

== Arthur Barrington ==
Major Arthur Barrington is a covert handler of Team X, such as Wolverine and Sabretooth. Department H later targets Barrington despite having Guardian and Puck as bodyguards; David North / Maverick is initially successful before overriding the mental conditioning, but Barrington is assassinated by Hammer.

== Base ==
Base (Hiro Sokuto) is a mutant who was born in Hiroshima, Japan, and his powers surfaced at an early age. His father sold him and his brother to the Yakuza to act as drug runners, but they were eventually captured by the Mutagenic Search Squad, and became a member of Genetix.

== Basilisk ==
The Basilisk is the name of three characters in Marvel Comics.

=== Basil Elks ===
Basilisk

Publication information
- Publisher: Marvel Comics
- First appearance: Marvel Team-Up #16 (December 1973)
- Created by: Len Wein; Gil Kane

In-story information
- Alter ego: Basil Elks
- Team affiliations: Hood's unnamed crime syndicate
- Abilities: Enhanced strength, stamina and reflexes Energy projection Temperature and molecular manipulation Volcano generation

Basil Elks is a supervillain who debuts in Marvel Team-Up #16 (December 1973). He is a petty thief, breaks into a museum to steal what he believes is an ordinary emerald—but is, in fact, a Kree artifact called the Alpha Stone. Elks miscalculates the security guards' rounds and is caught and fired upon when he reaches for a weapon. The guard's bullet accidentally hits and shatters the gem, causing an explosion that transforms Elks into a humanoid reptilian. Elks flash-freezes the guard in place, and realizing that he now has superhuman abilities, decides to become a supervillain and calls himself the Basilisk.

Basilisk is among the many villains killed by the Scourge of the Underworld. The Hood resurrects Basilisk and several other victims of the Scourge during the "Dark Reign" storyline.

Upon absorbing the Alpha Stone, Basil Elks gained enhanced physical strength, reflexes, and stamina. The Basilisk's main offensive weapon is his eye beams, which can take the form of concussive force (these could also be directed at the ground for limited flight) or energy that manipulated temperature (to boiling or freezing extremes) or molecules. Upon absorbing the Omega Stone, Basilisk's powers increase to their full extent, allowing him to generate volcanoes worldwide.

=== Wayne Gifford ===
Basilisk

Publication information
- Publisher: Marvel Comics
- First appearance: Morbius the Living Vampire #5 (January 1993)

In-story information
- Alter ego: Wayne Gifford
- Abilities: Superhuman strength and agility Paralyzing stare

Wayne Gifford is a lizard-like villain who first appears in Morbius the Living Vampire #5 (Jan. 1993). He is a dysfunctional man, turning to demon-worship to create an alternate persona, the Basilisk. Possessing a paralyzing stare, the Basilisk battles the anti-hero Morbius the Living Vampire.

Wayne Gifford was a normal human until becoming the Basilisk, a large humanoid reptile. The creature possesses superhuman strength and agility, and a paralyzing stare. The Basilisk's one weakness is sunlight. In an inversion of a common horror trope, when looking in a mirror the Basilisk sees his ordinary human form.

=== Mike Columbus ===
Basilisk

Publication information
- Publisher: Marvel Comics
- First appearance: New X-Men #135 (December 2002)
- Created by: Grant Morrison; Frank Quitely

In-story information
- Alter ego: Mike Columbus
- Team affiliations: Xavier Institute Student Body; Brotherhood of Mutants
- Abilities: Paralyzing light pulse projection

Mike Columbus is a mutant who first appears in New X-Men #135 (December 2002). He is a mutant and a student at the Xavier Institute. Possessing limited intelligence and persecuted in his youth due to his abnormal appearance (bald, abnormally large and with one eye), Basilisk becomes extremely aggressive. Once Basilisk's mutant power manifests, he suffers from seizures until he is given a device to help regulate his powers. Basilisk later joins the Brotherhood of Mutants until he is killed by Magneto.

Basilisk possesses a fleshy head devoid of all features except for his ears, mouth, and single eye. His eye can emit a pulse of high-frequency strobe light from his brain that paralyzes those exposed to it.

== Battleaxe ==
Battleaxe (Anita Ehren) is a wrestler who wields axes as her weapon of choice. Defeating Titania in a wrestling match, she claims the title as champion of the Grapplers. However, when Titania is killed by the Scourge of the Underworld, Battleaxe vows to avenge her former teammate. She takes out her aggression on the Thing, battling him in a wrestling match. Realizing Battleaxe is taking her anger out on him, the Thing purposely loses the match. She later joins Superia's Femizons and battles Captain America.

== Beautiful Dreamer ==
Beautiful Dreamer

Publication information
- Publisher: Marvel Comics
- First appearance: Power Pack #12 (July 1985)
- Created by: Louise Simonson; June Brigman

In-story information
- Species: Human mutant
- Team affiliations: The 198; Morlocks
- Abilities: "Dream smoke" allowing to psionically alter memories

Beautiful Dreamer is a member of the Morlocks whose real name and past prior to joining the group are unknown. She follows the Morlock leader Masque for a time and committed criminal acts by manipulating others with her mental powers at his behest. However, Beautiful Dreamer's primary motivation for doing so, as with most of her fellow Morlocks, is presumed to be her desire for company and community.

Beautiful Dreamer is one of the 198 mutants who retain their powers after the events of M-Day. She is captured by Bastion's Purifiers and injected with the Legacy Virus, which causes her to kill those attending a Friends of Humanity anti-mutant rally before dying. Beautiful Dreamer resurfaces during the Krakoan Age, presumably having been resurrected by the Five.

Beautiful Dreamer possesses the ability to psionically alter the memories of others using her "dream smoke".

=== Beautiful Dreamer in other media ===
A character based on Beautiful Dreamer named Sonya Simonson / Dreamer appears in The Gifted, portrayed by Elena Satine.

== Bedlam ==
Bedlam is the name of several characters in Marvel Comics.

=== Jesse Aaronson ===
Jesse Aaronson was orphaned at the age of five after his brother Christopher uses his mutant powers to make their parents' car crash. The two are put into separate foster care systems; Jesse goes through multiple foster homes due to his emotional instability before being placed in a psychiatric hospital at age 13. He is exploited by one of the doctors, who wanted to use Jesse's burgeoning powers for his benefit. The doctor experiments on Jesse and attempts to convince him that his brother is simply a figment of his imagination. Jesse is eventually rescued by Lucas Whyndam and ends up in the hands of Professor X's Mutant Underground Support Engine (M.U.S.E.), a group based in Montana with the goal of rescuing mutants and training them as field agents.

After turning 19, Jesse leaves M.U.S.E. to find his brother and enlists the help of Domino. Domino tells Bedlam that his parents are information analysts at the National Security Department. The two visit his parents' former supervisor, Dabney Saunders, who is senile and residing in a retirement home. They are subdued by Christopher, who has since founded a new incarnation of the Hellions and become known as King Bedlam. Christopher offers membership to Jesse, who gladly accepts. The group's true intentions, however, are to reanimate Armageddon Man in order to blackmail the U.S. government into paying one billion dollars. X-Force subdues Armageddon Man, but the New Hellions escape. In the aftermath, Bedlam joins X-Force.

Bedlam is among the mutants who are captured by the Church of Humanity and crucified on the grounds of the Xavier Institute. Archangel uses his healing blood to revive Magma and Jubilee, but Bedlam does not survive.

During the Krakoan Age, Bedlam is resurrected following the establishment of Krakoa as a mutant nation.

=== Alpha Flight villain ===
Bedlam is a mutate who is an enemy of Alpha Flight.

=== Symbiote version ===
Bedlam is an alternate timeline version of Eddie Brock who can possess and manipulate symbiotes.

During the "Venom War" storyline, Bedlam accompanies Eddie Brock in battling Dylan Brock, with Eddie and Dylan both seeking sole possession of Venom. Bedlam merges with Eddie Brock, but is neutralized by Agent Anti-Venom.

=== Bedlam in other media ===
The Jesse Aaronson incarnation of Bedlam appears in Deadpool 2, portrayed by Terry Crews. This version is a member of X-Force.

== Beetle ==
Beetle is the name of several characters in Marvel Comics.

=== Leila Davis ===
The second Beetle is Leila Davis. Created by writer Danny Fingeroth and artist Al Milgrom, the character debuted in Deadly Foes of Spider-Man #1 (May 1991).

Davis is the former wife of Ringer, a fellow criminal who was killed by the Scourge. Davis, vowing revenge, joins the Sinister Syndicate.

Donning red and black armor, Davis takes the name Hardshell and allies with Boomerang, Rhino, and Vulture. The group becomes involved in a massive fight that also involves Stegron, Doctor Octopus, Swarm, the Answer, Jenkins and Spider-Man, with each party trying to gain control of an experimental gun. Spider-Man eventually stood victorious and most of the costumed criminals are taken into custody. Davis is teleported away by her husband, who had survived being shot by Scourge and had been turned into the cyborg Strikeback by A.I.M.

As the second Beetle, Davis joins the Redeemers, which includes former members of the Thunderbolts. Her true identity is revealed to the rest of her teammates, revealing that her husband died some time earlier due to his body breaking down due to his cyborg enhancements. The group soon encounters the supervillain Graviton, who kills Leila.

=== Ultimate Marvel version ===
The Ultimate Marvel equivalent of Beetle is an unnamed mercenary from Latveria. Spider-Man first finds Beetle robbing a sample of the Venom symbiote from Roxxon, and ultimately stops him. Beetle later breaks into Bolivar Trask's lab where Eddie Brock is held, leading to Venom chasing after Beetle. Just as Beetle is cornered, Venom is stopped by Spider-Man. When the Venom symbiote leaves Brock and attaches to Spider-Man, Beetle escapes in the confusion. Beetle later captures Venom in Central Park and flies off to deliver Venom to Latveria.

=== Beetle in other media ===
- The Ultimate Marvel incarnation of Beetle appears in Ultimate Spider-Man (2005), voiced by Tucker Smallwood. This version works for Latverian agents, collecting genetic information from superhumans to genetically-engineer super-soldiers.
- The Ultimate Marvel incarnation of Beetle appears in Ultimate Spider-Man (2012), voiced by Steve Blum.
- An unidentified incarnation of Beetle appears in the Moon Girl and Devil Dinosaur episode "Ride Along", voiced by Chuck D. This version pilots a large beetle ship.
- The Ultimate Marvel incarnation of Beetle appears as a playable character in Lego Marvel Super Heroes.

== Behemoth ==
Behemoth is the name of several characters in Marvel Comics.

=== Kay-Twelve ===
Kay-Twelve is a robot with synthetic clay-like muscles who was created by the Committee to fight Werewolf by Night.

=== Hulk clone ===
Behemoth is a clone of Hulk created by the Master of the World. Behemoth and his fellow clones go on to form Strikeforce One.

== Bei the Blood Moon ==
Bei the Blood Moon

Publication information
- Publisher: Marvel Comics
- First appearance: X of Swords: Stasis (Dec. 2020)
- Created by: Jonathan Hickman (writer); Tini Howard (writer); Pepe Larraz (artist)

In-story information
- Full name: Bei
- Species: Human mutant
- Team affiliations: Swordbearers of Arakko; Excalibur; Knights of X
- Partnerships: Cypher (husband)
- Abilities: Doom Note: Concussive sound blasts; Psionic translation

Bei the Blood Moon is a mutant from Arakko. For the first few decades of her life, she did not speak. The first time she did, she inadvertently leveled a mountain with her powers. Bei became renowned on Arakko as a huntress and warrior of great skill.

Bei is recruited to participate in the X of Swords tournament arranged by Saturnyne. Her first challenge is against Krakoan mutant Cypher, but rather than battle, the two are made to marry each other. Bei later participates in two more challenges: a dance contest and a duel with Cable, both of which she wins. During Annihilation's invasion of Krakoa at the end of the tournament, Bei allies with Cypher and the Krakoans to repel the Amenthi Daemons. She remains married to Cypher after the battle and moves to Krakoa to live with him.

=== Powers and abilities of Bei the Blood Moon ===
Bei does not use language to speak, but rather the Doom Note, a sound which reverberates in her chest. She can use it to produce destructive sound waves strong enough to level a mountain. The Doom Note also psionically translates itself to be universally understood by whoever hears it.

This ability to communicate without language conflicts with her husband Cypher's language-based powers and makes him incapable of understanding her. As Bei is unable to communicate with him verbally, they converse by writing, reading physical cues, or interpretations from any third parties present.

Bei is also renowned for her hunting and fighting skills. She wields a bladed weapon named Seducer.

=== Bei the Blood Moon in other media ===
Bei received a HeroClix figurine, as did her sword Seducer.

== Belladonna (Narda Ravanna) ==
Belladonna (Narda Ravanna) is a

She first appeared in The Spectacular Spider-Man #43 (June, 1980). She was created by Roger Stern and Mike Zeck. The character also appeared in Spectacular Spider-Man #47 and 48 (October–November 1980). Belladonna received an entry in the original Official Handbook of the Marvel Universe #2.

Narda Ravanna was born in Boston, Massachusetts. She is a chemist and former co-owner of Vaughn-Pope Cosmetics with her sister, Desiree Vaughan-Pope. When they refuse to sell their company to billionaire and fashion designer Roderick Kingsley, he used the media to smear their products and ruin their career. Narda entered New York and took the identity of Belladonna to gain vengeance. She gathered a team of criminal allies, and incurred the wrath of the Prowler. Her assault on Kingsley was interrupted by Spider-Man, who handed her, her gang and Prowler over to the police.

Belladonna wields a gun that fires neo-atropine gas for knocking out foes.

== Belle ==
Belle is a character appearing in comic books published by Marvel Comics. Created by Gerry Duggan and Ryan Stegman, the character first appeared in Uncanny Avengers vol. 3 #2 (November 2015).

Belle is a futuristic artificial intelligence utilized by Cable.

== Bellona ==
Bellona is one of several clones of X-23 created by Robert Chandler of Alchemax. Bellona did not have the same mutations as X-23. After getting revenge on Chandler, Bellona went to work for Kimura.

During the "Gang War" storyline, Bellona is hired to provide weapons to the Heat. Bellona is injured by Elektra, falls off a roof, and is presumed dead. However, Elektra doubts that Bellona has died after finding that her body has disappeared. Bellona returned in the series Generation X-23.

== Berserker ==
Berserker is an ancient man who became immortal when he was empowered by the Cave of Glowing Walls. He fought the Avengers when he was freed in modern times, and was banished to the Shadow Realm.

== Berzerker ==
Berzerker (Ray Carter) is a mutant with electrical abilities and the leader of the Tunnelers, an offshoot group of Morlocks who hated Callisto's main group and dubbed them Drain Dwellers. Initially a group of ten, six of the Tunnelers were killed when the Marauders were sent to kill the Morlocks. Berzerker and three others survived the attack, only to have another battle with Beast and Iceman, thinking they were Marauders, too. The battle ends when the Tunnelers figure out that the X-Factor members are not their enemies.

Joining X-Factor at their base, the Tunnelers find out about their hosts' mock mutant hunter identities. The Tunnelers eventually leave hoping to find a new home in New Jersey. They encounter a human street gang called the Savage Wolf Gang, who try to rob them. The Tunnelers fight back, resulting in the death of Blowhard and two of the three gang members. The Tunnelers then get in a confrontation with the police, who kill Scaleface. Cyclops and Jean Grey arrive to save the remaining two Tunnelers, but are attacked by Berzerker, who is enraged by the loss of Scaleface and has vowed revenge on humanity. Cyclops knocks Berzerker into a river, where he is electrocuted by his own powers and killed.

=== Berzerker in other media ===
- Berzerker, renamed Ray Crisp, appears in X-Men: Evolution, voiced by Tony Sampson. This version is a pacifistic student at the Xavier Institute who is uninvolved with the Morlocks.
- Berzerker appears in Wolverine and the X-Men, voiced by Nolan North. This version is a member of a possible future version of the X-Men.

== Big Guy ==
The Big Guy is a character appearing in American comic books published by Marvel Comics. The character, created by Vince Alascia, first appeared in Captain America #54 (January 1946). Alvin Martinike was a dwarfish mobster during the 1940s who fostered the illusion that he is a man of massive stature by buying large furniture and committing "big" crimes but he is foiled by Captain America and Bucky.

== Big Man ==
Big Man is the name of several characters in Marvel Comics.

=== Frederick Foswell ===
Frederick Foswell (also known as Patch) is a reporter at the Daily Bugle who was born in Queens, New York. He begins leading a double life as the Big Man, head of New York's crime and the boss of the Enforcers. Frail and diminutive in stature, Foswell conceals his identity by wearing a mask, oversized coat, and platform boots. Although he has a considerable run of success as a crime boss, a confrontation with Spider-Man ends with the Enforcers being apprehended, and shortly afterwards the police deduce his identity and arrest him.

Following a crime war, the Kingpin takes over New York's underworld. Foswell tries to reinstate himself as the Big Man, but the Kingpin forcibly enlists him as a lieutenant. After the Kingpin attempts to drown both J. Jonah Jameson and Spider-Man, Foswell turns against the Kingpin. While the Kingpin and Spider-Man battle, Foswell runs into the basement of the Kingpin's building to try to help Jameson. After finding Jameson, Foswell is killed protecting Jameson from a group of thugs.

=== Janice Foswell ===
Janice Foswell is the daughter of the original Big Man (Frederick Foswell) and seeks to follow in her father's footsteps to gain control of the New York underworld. She is soon joined by Crime Master and Sandman. She and the Enforcers are defeated by Spider-Man, the Human Torch and the Sons of the Tiger. Over a dispute about eliminating Spider-Man and the Sons, Janice is killed by the Crime Master who is revealed to have been her fiancé and son of the original Crime-Master (Nick Lewis Jr.). Both had separately pursued vengeance against Spider-Man without knowledge of each other's identity.

=== Frederick Foswell, Jr. ===
Frederick Foswell, Jr. is the son of Frederick Foswell and the brother of Janice Foswell. He assumes the Big Man role to gain revenge for the death of his father and sister, which he blames on Spider-Man. Piloting a giant robot version of Big Man, Foswell attacks Spider-Man and J. Jonah Jameson, assuming Jameson will help him kill Spider-Man. Spider-Man and the remorseful Jameson defeat Foswell as Spider-Man hurls the Big Man robot outside before it can self-destruct. Foswell is then arrested by the police.

=== Other versions ===
- An original incarnation of the Big Man, Hank Pym Jr., appears in the MC2 story A-Next. He is Hank Pym and Janet van Dyne's son who inherited the former's size-shifting powers and founding member of the Revengers. Pym initially fights the superhero team A-Next before reforming and joining a government-sponsored team.
- A character based on the Big Man, Mr. Big, appears in Ultimate Spider-Man. He is a mobster and leader of the Enforcers that plots to usurp Wilson Fisk who killed him.

=== Big Man in other media ===
- Characters based on the Big Man appear in The Spectacular Spider-Man.
  - Frederick Foswell / Patch, voiced by James Arnold Taylor, is a reporter for the Daily Bugle who works undercover as a criminal, and won a Pulitzer Prize for writing an exposé on Silvermane's criminal activities.
  - The Big Man alias is utilized primarily by Tombstone and subsequently by the Green Goblin.

== Big Wheel ==
Big Wheel is the name of two characters in Marvel Comics.

=== Jackson Weele ===
Big Wheel

Publication information
- Publisher: Marvel Comics
- First appearance: The Amazing Spider-Man #183 (1978)
- Created by: Marv Wolfman (writer); Ross Andru (artist); Mike Esposito (illustrator)

In-story information
- Alter ego: Jackson Weele
- Species: Human
- Team affiliations: Vil-Anon
- Abilities: Drives a large metal wheel equipped with guns and waldo-arms

Jackson Weele is a businessman who has embezzled from his company. Fearing that he might be caught, he hires a youthful criminal named Rocket Racer to steal the evidence that incriminates him. However, Rocket Racer opts to use the evidence to blackmail Weele instead. Despairing, Weele tries to commit suicide, but Rocket Racer prevents him from doing so. However, Racer is not particularly kind to Weele, disparagingly referring to him as "Big Weele". Humiliated by Rocket Racer's taunts, Weele visits the mechanical genius and underworld supplier Tinkerer, who the Rocket Racer boasted had upgraded his equipment. At Weele's urging, the Tinkerer creates a large metal wheel that can climb up buildings, complete with guns and waldo-arms. With this new vehicle, Weele becomes the supervillain Big Wheel. At one point, Weele temporarily retired from villainy, using his wheel in demolition derbies and speaking at events for Vil-Anon.

=== Second Big Wheel ===
An unnamed operator of the Big Wheel went on a crime spree until he was defeated by Spider-Man.

=== Reception ===
In 2022, CBR.com ranked Big Wheel 8th in their "Spider-Man's 10 Funniest Villains" list.

=== Big Wheel in other media ===
- The Jackson Weele incarnation of Big Wheel appears in the Spider-Man: The Animated Series episode "Rocket Racer", voiced by Michael Des Barres. This version is an aeronautics expert who leads a gang of high-tech thieves.
- The Jackson Weele incarnation of Big Wheel appears in the Moon Girl and Devil Dinosaur episode "Make It, Don't Break It", voiced by Sam Riegel. This version is a RobotWarz player who sought revenge after losing a match.
- Big Wheel appears in Spider-Man: Mysterio's Menace.
- Big Wheel appears as an assist character in the PSP version of Spider-Man: Web of Shadows.
- A Marvel 2099-inspired incarnation of Big Wheel appears in the Nintendo DS version of Spider-Man: Edge of Time, voiced by Steve Blum.

== Big Zero ==
Big Zero (Amity Hunter) is a size-shifting white supremacist who allegedly originates from a fascist world in the Microverse. She joins a group that is a counterpart to the Young Avengers. When the real Young Avengers show up and repel them, the group rebrands as a younger version of the Masters of Evil called the Young Masters.

== Bird-Man ==
Bird-Man is the name of several characters in Marvel Comics.

=== Henry Hawk ===
Henry Hawk is a criminal who was recruited by a man named the Organizer to form the original Ani-Men and was given a bird-themed costume equipped with wings. The Organizer was secretly Abner Jonas, a candidate for mayor of New York City, who sent the Ani-Men on missions to undermine the current administration. Daredevil defeated them and the Ani-Men and Organizer are imprisoned.

Ape-Man, Bird-Man, and Cat-Man later rejoin the Ani-Men, and go on to work for Count Nefaria. Nefaria's scientists submit the unwitting Ani-Men to processes that give them superhuman powers and animal-like forms. The Ani-Men invade the Cheyenne Mountain missile base for Nefaria and fight the X-Men.

The Ani-Men lose their superhuman powers and reverted to normal. Count Nefaria sends the four original Ani-Men to kill Tony Stark. However, the Spymaster detonates a bomb with which he had intended to kill Stark, killing the Ani-Men.

=== Achille DiBacco ===
Death-Stalker sometime later recruits a new team of Ani-Men, with a new Ape-Man, Bird-Man, and Cat-Man. This Bird-Man is Achille DiBacco who was given Hawk's Bird-Man costume. He sends the new Ani-Men to capture Matt Murdock. The Black Widow defeats Bird-Man, and Death-Stalker murders Ape-Man and Cat-Man upon the completion of their mission, effectively ending the Ani-Men.

Bird-Man is later murdered by the Scourge of the Underworld, along with many other villains, at the Bar with No Name.

Bird-Man is among the 18 victims of the Scourge who are resurrected by Hood to eliminate the Punisher. As a side-effect of his revival, Bird-Man gains a bird-like appearance.

=== Unnamed Bird-Man ===
During the Civil War storyline, a third Bird-Man alongside a third Ape-Man and a third Cat-Man are among the villains in Hammerhead's supervillain army.

== Biri ==
Biri is a female black leopard whose mother, Julani, was shot by a guard at the Central Park Municipal Zoo, veterinarian Shanna O'Hara was asked to take her cubs Ina and Biri to Dahomey, Africa to release them into the wild.

Shanna stayed with the animals and they became her allies, but they were both killed when the sorcerer, Raga-Shah, transferred their life forces into the blood beast, Ghamola, which Shanna was forced to destroy.

== Derek Bishop ==
Derek Bishop is the father of Kate Bishop / Hawkeye and Susan Bishop, and the husband of Eleanor Bishop, who secretly conspired with supervillains to put a hit on Kate and Clint Barton / Hawkeye. Derek and Eleanor later appear as members of Madame Masque's Masters of Evil.

=== Derek Bishop in other media ===
Derek Bishop appears in Hawkeye, portrayed by Brian d'Arcy James. This version was killed during the Battle of New York.

== Eleanor Bishop ==
Eleanor Bishop is the mother of Kate Bishop and Susan Bishop, and the wife of Derek Bishop. Although she was presumed deceased, Eleanor is revealed to be alive as a vampire while working as Madame Masque's silent partner. Eleanor and Derek later join Madame Masque's Masters of Evil.

=== Eleanor Bishop in other media ===
Eleanor Bishop appears in Hawkeye, portrayed by Vera Farmiga. This version is Bishop Security's CEO and Jack Duquesne's ex-fiancé.

== Bison ==
Bison (Billy Kitson) was a champion basketball player who won a college scholarship and planned to become a professional basketball player, until another player accidentally tripped him resulting in Billy getting a broken leg. This ended his dreams and his relationship with his girlfriend Shimari Asbery. Billy made contact with the Egyptian god Seth, who transformed him into a humanoid bull dubbed Bison and made him his servant in exchange for his leg being healed.

In later appearances, Bison joins the Crimson Cowl's Masters of Evil, seeking to make enough money to cure himself and reunite with Shimari. Bison makes a minor appearance in the "Hunted" storyline, where he is killed by Hunter-Bots.

== Black Ant ==
Black Ant is a Life Model Decoy based on Eric O'Grady who was created after O'Grady's death. In "All-New, All-Different Marvel," Black Ant appears as a member of Hood's Illuminati.

During the "Secret Empire" storyline, Black Ant appears as a member of Hydra's Avengers. During the battle in Washington DC, Taskmaster and Black Ant witness their teammate Odinson having enough of working for Hydra and striking them down. The two of them defect from Hydra and free the captive Champions. When Taskmaster and Black Ant asks for them to put in a good word for them, Spider-Man webs them up regardless.

== Black Box ==
- First appearance: Deadpool: The Circle Chase #2 (July 1993)
- Created by: Fabian Nicieza, Joe Madureira
- Species: Human mutant
- Aliases: Commcast
- Further reading: Black Box at Comic Vine; Black Box at League of Comic Geeks; Black Box at Marvel Database

Black Box (Garabed Bashur), formerly known as Commcast, is a character appearing in American comic books published by Marvel Comics. He is a mutant and sometimes acts as a supervillain. He first appeared as Bashur in Deadpool: The Circle Chase #2, first appeared as Commcast in #3, and first appeared as Black Box in Cable & Deadpool #13.

Garabed Bashur, a native of India, is a technopath who possesses the mutant ability to psychically retrieve, interpret and store data from any form of electronic media (essentially a highly potent electronic form of telepathy). He was trained in this ability by Professor Charles Xavier, but Xavier rejected Bashur upon learning of his criminal tendencies.

Bashur used the knowledge gathered by his power to amass a small fortune and became the leader of a small mercenary outfit, the Executive Elite, under the alias of Commcast. The mercenaries were hired to retrieve data that was in Deadpool's possession, and although the other Elites were killed in the battle, Commcast survived, as only a clone body was killed. Some time later, Professor X contemplated using Bashur to restore data that had been lost from his files when the X-Mansion's systems were compromised by the Phalanx, although it is unknown if Bashur ever actually assisted Xavier. Bashur was later seen helping a target of one of Sabretooth's murder sprees find someone who could protect him; in this case, that someone was Maverick.

When his clone vats developed a problem preventing him from making additional clones of himself, Bashur created the Black Box identity, using the robot armour to prevent engaging directly, and began selling his information to the highest bidder. He crossed paths with Deadpool, attempting to convince him to kill his sometime ally Cable. Black Box, Cable, Deadpool, BAD Girls, Inc., the Cat, and Weasel searched for the mysterious Dominus Objective, a computer virus which would help Bashur sort through the massive amounts of data that his power let him access. After the Objective was released into the Rand Corporation, Rand CEO Iron Fist and his sometime partner Luke Cage fought Cable and Deadpool. Eventually Cable and Deadpool tracked the real Bashur down, but after a fight involving hundreds of clones of Makeshift and Rive, Bashur was eventually convinced by Cable to join him. He resided on Cable's island community of Providence acting as Head of Surveillance and a data archiver shortly after.

Bashur possesses the ability to actively receive and store all forms of electronic data and transmissions in his mind. He does so passively, in a manner that does not interfere with the regular transmission, and can receive electronic signals over a great distance; even isolating himself in a rural area did not completely shut out the information. Black Box has an infinite storage capacity in his mind, containing every piece of information he has been exposed to. Unfortunately, this data is streamed into his mind far faster than he can accurately scan it all consciously. Though the information is present in his mind, it takes a combination of meditation, effort, and sheer willpower for him to locate and extract specific bits of info on command. Routing the Dominus Objective through his Black Box armor created an artificial "file search" capacity, enabling him to summon up information at will simply by focusing on it.

== Black Crow ==
Black Crow (Jesse Black Crow) is a superhero appearing in American comic books published by Marvel Comics. Black Crow first appeared in Captain America #292 (April 1984) and was created by writer J. M. DeMatteis and penciller Paul Neary.

Jesse Black Crow, a member of the Navajo Nation, left his New Mexico reservation at the age of sixteen, after his grandfather's death, and moved to New York City, eventually becoming a construction worker on skyscrapers. Following an accident on the job, Jesse was left paraplegic. While comatose, Jesse received a vision from the spirit of the Earth showing him the plight of the Native American people. When needed, the spirit transformed Jesse into Black Crow, a mystical warrior, and protector of his people.

== Black Diamond ==
In Black Panther: Intergalactic, a copy of Emma Frost's unredeemed mind is transferred into an African clone body of her DNA combined with that of T'Challa a working under B'Wete, Herald of Wakanda and leader of the Ebony Guard of the Wakandan Empire. Dubbed Black Diamond, she looks exactly like Emma Frost but black.

== Black Dwarf ==
Black Dwarf

Publication information
- Publisher: Marvel Comics
- First appearance: Cameo appearance: New Avengers (vol. 3) #8 (September 2013); Full appearance: Infinity #1 (October 2013)
- Created by: Jonathan Hickman; Jerome Opeña

In-story information
- Team affiliations: Black Order
- Abilities: Superhuman strength, speed, stamina, durability, endurance, and senses; Utilizes a powerful axe

Black Dwarf is a supervillain appearing in American comic books published by Marvel Comics. He is a prominent member of the Black Order, a team of aliens who work for Thanos. Black Dwarf first appeared in a one panel cameo in New Avengers (vol. 3) #8 (September 2013) and was created by Jonathan Hickman and Jerome Opeña. His full appearance, along with a number of the other members of the Black Order, takes place in Infinity #1 (October 2013).

Black Dwarf is a member of Thanos's Black Order, serving as the powerhouse of the group. Thanos sends Black Dwarf to attack Wakanda during his invasion of Earth, but he is overpowered and forced to retreat. For his failure, Thanos expels Black Dwarf from the Black Order.

Thanos gives Black Dwarf one more chance to prove himself by sending him to protect the Peak and keep it from being reclaimed by the Avengers following their fight against the Builders. During the fight against the Avengers, Black Dwarf is killed by Ronan the Accuser.

In the storyline "No Surrender", Black Dwarf is resurrected by the Challenger, who reassembles the Black Order to battle Grandmaster's Lethal Legion.

=== Black Dwarf in other media ===
- Black Dwarf makes non-speaking appearances in Avengers Assemble as a member of Thanos' Black Order.
- Black Dwarf appears in Guardians of the Galaxy, voiced by Jesse Burch.
- Cull Obsidian, a character based on Black Dwarf, appears in media set in the Marvel Cinematic Universe, portrayed by Terry Notary.
  - Introduced in Avengers: Infinity War, Thanos sends Obsidian and Ebony Maw to Earth to retrieve the Infinity Stones. While attempting to retrieve the Time Stone from Doctor Strange, Obsidian fights Iron Man and Spider-Man before Wong sends Obsidian to Antarctica, severing his left arm in the process. After being picked up by Corvus Glaive and Proxima Midnight and receiving a cybernetic prosthetic off-screen, Obsidian joins them in attacking the Avengers in Wakanda to retrieve the Mind Stone. However, Bruce Banner uses Iron Man's Hulkbuster armor to send Obsidian flying into Wakanda's force-field, killing him.
  - An alternate timeline version of Obsidian appears in Avengers: Endgame. He joins Thanos in traveling through time to stop the Avengers from foiling Thanos' plans, only to be crushed by Scott Lang / Giant Man in the ensuing fight.
  - Alternate timeline versions of Obsidian appear in What If...?.
- Black Dwarf appears as a mini-boss and boss in Marvel Avengers Alliance.
- Cull Obsidian appears as a boss and unlockable playable character in Marvel Future Fight.
- Cull Obsidian appears as an unlockable playable character in Lego Marvel Super Heroes 2 via the "Marvel's Avengers: Infinity War Movie Level Pack" DLC.
- Cull Obsidian appears as a support character in Marvel Puzzle Quest.
- Cull Obsidian appears as an unlockable playable character and mini-boss in Marvel Contest of Champions.
- Cull Obsidian appears as a boss in Marvel Ultimate Alliance 3: The Black Order, voiced again by Jesse Burch.

== Black Fox ==
Black Fox is the name of two characters in Marvel Comics.

=== Raul Chalmers ===
Black Fox

Publication information
- Publisher: Marvel Comics
- First appearance: The Amazing Spider-Man #255 (Aug 1984)
- Created by: Tom DeFalco; Ron Frenz

In-story information
- Partnerships: Red Ghost
- Notable aliases: Raul Chalmers

Raul Chalmers is a jewel thief with a long international career. In his sixties, he yearns to pull off one last big heist so that he can retire for good to the French Riviera. However, his retirement plans continue to be deferred due to unfortunate encounters with super-beings. In each of his encounters the Fox, having no super-human powers of his own, is in way over his head. The thief's usual response when caught by a superhero is to surrender and negotiate release, which he accomplishes with fabricated stories about his poor wife and children or his poor deceased mother. However, in his last encounter with Spider-Man, the Fox was unable to pull the same trick and was carted off to jail.

In addition to coming into conflict with Spider-Man, Black Fox has been forced to lead the Red Ghost's super-apes on a robbery mission. He has also been pursued by Silver Sable and Doctor Doom, and had his fiancée murdered by the assassin Chance.

== Black Fog ==
Black Fog is an unnamed serial killer who operated in Hyderabad, India. He is later apprehended by the authorities. The serial killer was attacked by the relatives of his victims while the guards ignored him, causing him to lose his legs and left arm as well as being scarred. Springing him from prison, Zero/One enhances Black Fog while rejuvenating his body, equipping him with cybernetic limbs, and giving him the ability to generate a thick black fog-like substance as well as regeneration abilities. Zero/One sends Black Fog to fight Red Hulk, who manages to fight him off at the cost of Red Hulk's two Life Model Decoy allies.

== Black Racer ==
Black Racer is a member of the fourth Serpent Squad. She is introduced robbing a casino in Las Vegas. Sidewinder took note of this, and invited the Serpent Squad to join his Serpent Society. They accepted, but were really just involved in a ploy to get Viper into the leadership position of the Society. Black Racer was among the several members to side with Viper and betray Sidewinder. However, after Viper abandoned the group, Black Racer continued to serve with the Society under leadership of Cobra. Black Racer has been sometimes depicted as Caucasian, and other times as African-American.

== Black Swan ==
Black Swan is the name of two supervillains appearing in American comic books published by Marvel Comics. The first Black Swan appeared in Deadpool #65 and was created by Gail Simone and the artists of Udon Studios. The second Black Swan first appeared in New Avengers (vol. 3) #1 and was created by Jonathan Hickman and Steve Epting.

=== Black Swan (mutant) ===
Black Swan is a German mutant who was raised in a circus and trained in combat and gunmanship. He utilizes his ability to infect the minds of others with disruptive "telepathic viruses" to become a mercenary. Deadpool is hired to kill Black Swan, who beats him, infects his mind, and returns him to the United States, having him brutally beaten every few minutes to prevent him from healing.

Once Deadpool recovers, he battles Black Swan at his castle. A bomb Deadpool that had brought as insurance detonates before he can disarm it, destroying Black Swan's castle. Black Swan absorbs traits from Deadpool and Agent X to survive, resulting in the three sharing aspects of each other's powers, knowledge, and personalities. The three are later reunited, along with Taskmaster and Sandi Brandenberg. Black Swan demands the return of his personality and abilities, for which he required Agent X's help. Black Swan betrays Deadpool and Agent X and absorbs both their powers, enhancing his own abilities to a tremendous level. Together with the mercenary Outlaw, Deadpool, Agent X, and Taskmaster overwhelm Black Swan's healing ability and kill him.

Black Swan is later revealed to have survived and is hired by the mutant Black Box to kill Deadpool.

=== Black Swan (Yabbat Ummon Tarru) ===
Yabbat Ummon Tarru is a princess from Earth-1365, born in the Hidden City. When she is four years old, her universe is involved in an incursion event with another universe, which would destroy both universes. A race of beings called Black Priests invade from the parallel Earth, intent on destroying Earth-1365 to save their own universe. Yabbat flees into the Library of Worlds, a waystation of the multiverse, and is taken in by the Black Swans.

Black Swan comes to Earth-616 when it experiences its first incursion event, intent on destroying Earth in order to save both universes involved in the incursion. Black Swan successfully triggers an anti-matter injection device, but accidentally destroys her own universe instead of Earth-616. She is then captured by Black Panther and imprisoned underground in Wakanda. Black Swan gives the Illuminati the means to stop incursions after they barely succeeded in stopping two previous incursions.

After Namor is forced to leave the Illuminati, he frees Black Swan, Thanos, Proxima Midnight, Corvus Glaive, and Terrax from prison to form the Cabal and stop further incursions. Following the destruction and recreation of the multiverse, Thanos recruits Black Swan into the Black Order.

== Black Tiger ==
- Further reading: Black Tiger at the Comic Book DB (archived from the original); Black Tiger at the Grand Comics Database

Black Tiger (Abraham "Abe" Brown) is a martial arts superhero in Marvel Comics. The character, created by Steve Englehart and Jim Starlin, first appeared as Abe Brown in Deadly Hands of Kung Fu #1 (April 1974), and as Black Tiger in Deadly Hands of Kung Fu #1 (April 1974).

Abe Brown is the brother of Hobie Brown (aka the Prowler). Abe took up martial arts and befriended fellow martial artists Lin Sun and Bob Diamond. Together they found three jade tiger amulets and became the Sons of the Tigers. The Sons of Tigers would team up with other heroes such as Spider-Man, Iron Fist and the Human Torch. Abe and the Sons of Tigers broke up when Lin and Bob started fighting over a woman, throwing their amulets away in the process.

Abe later took a vacation and had his suitcase was switched by a mysterious woman named Brillalae. The suitcase contained the Black Tiger costume and Abe's plane was hijacked by men who were looking for it. The plane crashed, but Abe managed to survive. Abe chased one of the hijackers, named Mole, and both ended up being captured by the Bedouins who forced them to fight for the title of Black Dragon. Abe defeated Mole and won the costume, becoming Black Tiger. Abe was last seen having helped form the Penance Corps.

=== Black Tiger in other media ===
- Abraham Brown appears in Spider-Man (2017), voiced by Ogie Banks. This version is a technology expert and maintains his brother Hobie Brown's equipment.
- A character loosely based on Black Tiger simply referred to as Abe appears in Spider-Man: Homecoming, portrayed by Abraham Attah. This version is a classmate of Peter Parker and part of the decathlon team.

== Blackout ==
Blackout is the name of two characters in Marvel Comics.

=== Lilin ===
Blackout
- Blackout (Lilin). Art by Leinil Francis Yu.

Publication information
- Publisher: Marvel Comics
- First appearance: Ghost Rider vol. 3 #2 (June 1990)
- Created by: Howard Mackie; Javier Saltares

In-story information
- Alter ego: Unknown
- Species: Human/demon hybrid
- Team affiliations: Assassins Guild; The Firm
- Partnerships: Deathwatch; Lilin
- Abilities: Superhuman strength, speed, durability, and reflexes Psionic ability to extinguish light in his vicinity Teeth and fingernails are replaced with mechanical prosthetics

Blackout is a professional criminal who can create light-dampening fields that negate all visible light in their radius. He is extremely sensitive to light and possesses metallic teeth and nails.

Blackout is employed by the demonic crime lord Deathwatch as an enforcer and assassin. Deathwatch orders Blackout to search for bio-toxin canisters stolen by a youth gang named the Cypress Hill Jokers under their leader Paulie Stratton. Blackout murders detective Frank Loretti and his family before battling the Ghost Rider (Daniel Ketch).

The Lilin incarnation of Blackout is a half-demon who possesses supernatural powers, including enhanced strength, durability, agility, night vision, and the ability to extinguish all light sources in his vicinity. In addition to his demonic attributes, Blackout has had his nails and canine teeth replaced with razor-sharp mechanical prosthetics. Blackout is sensitive to sunlight, which is fatal to him with prolonged exposure.

==== Lilin in other media ====
A character loosely inspired by the Lilin incarnation of Blackout, named Ray Carrigan, appears in Ghost Rider: Spirit of Vengeance, portrayed by Johnny Whitworth. In creating Carrigan, the production team chose to base his characterization solely on the comic book incarnation's appearance and not his history. Additionally, Whitworth stated that he plays "the villain who, at the beginning, up until like page 70, is human, [...] I'm not a very nice guy. I'm bad. I get turned into, for those who read 'Ghost Rider', the character Blackout. I get turned into him by the devil to complete my job. That gives me the fortitude to fight Ghost Rider and the supernatural abilities to compete on some level with that guy." Carrigan is a mercenary, drug dealer, and gun runner who is hired by Roarke to kidnap the former's ex-girlfriend Nadya's son Danny, who Roarke fathered with her. This brings Carrigan into conflict with Ghost Rider, who defeats Carrigan and leaves him for dead. Roarke later finds that Carrigan was empowered with the ability to decay anything he touches and manipulate darkness so he can finish the job. Nonetheless, Blackout is eventually killed by Ghost Rider.

== Otto Blacktavius ==
In Black Panther: Intergalactic, a copy of Otto Octavius' unredeemed mind is transferred into an African clone body of his DNA combined with that of T'Challa instead of the one he had preferred, and, on noticing his black reflection, Otto renames himself Otto Blacktavius, covering his robotic arms in a golden grill and going by Golden Arms.

== Blackwing ==
Blackwing is the name of two characters in Marvel Comics.

=== Heavy Mettle version ===
A member of Joseph Manfredi's group Heavy Mettle also goes by the name of Blackwing.

During the "Dark Reign" storyline, Blackwing appears as a member of Norman Osborn's Shadow Initiative. She is later killed while attempting to retake Negative Zone Prison Alpha from Blastaar's forces.

== Donald Blake ==
- Further reading: Donald Blake at the Comic Book DB (archived from the original); Donald Blake at the Grand Comics Database

Dr. Donald "Don" Blake is the human identity of Marvel Comics character Thor. The character, created by Stan Lee and Jack Kirby, first appeared in Journey into Mystery #83 (August 1962).

Donald Blake is a construct of Odin, created for the purpose of giving a weak and powerless identity for Thor. After removing his memory, Thor started his life as the crippled Blake who chose to be a doctor after sympathizing with the sick. Blake finds the hammer Mjolnir and becomes Thor once more. Later, Blake regains his memories and soon learns the whole truth from Odin.

After Thor is killed by the Midgard Serpent, Blake becomes a separate entity and realizes that his whole life had been a lie. Under the alias of the Dragon, Blake conducts a deadly campaign against Odin, the former All-Father of Asgard, and targets all those blessed by Odin's magic. After a battle, Blake is defeated, but demands that Odin kill him, declaring that he will never allow himself to be imprisoned again. While Odin is ready to carry out the deed, Loki and Thor work together to stop him, recognizing Blake as their brother and someone who has suffered from being brought into their dysfunctional family. Nevertheless, Blake has caused a huge amount of suffering and remains dangerous, so Thor hands him over to Loki, who accepts the responsibility of dealing with Blake. Blake is chained up with a venomous serpent dripping venom into his eyes, the same punishment that Loki suffered in the past. It is later revealed that Blake's spirit reincarnated as Sigurd Jarlson, while his body was taken over by the Midgard Serpent.

=== Donald Blake in other media ===
- Donald Blake appears in The Marvel Super Heroes, voiced by Jack Creley.
- Donald Blake appears in the Spider-Man episode "Wrath of the Sub-Mariner", voiced by Jack Angel.
- Donald Blake appears in The Incredible Hulk Returns, portrayed by Steve Levitt. This version is a separate entity who can summon Thor using his hammer.
- Donald Blake appears in The Incredible Hulk episode "Mortal Bounds", voiced by Mark L. Taylor.
- Donald Blake makes a cameo appearance in Doctor Strange: The Sorcerer Supreme.

== Siena Blaze ==
Siena Blaze

Publication information
- Publisher: Marvel Comics
- First appearance: The Uncanny X-Men Annual #17 (June 1993)

In-story information
- Alter ego: Siena Blaze
- Species: Human mutant
- Team affiliations: Upstarts; All New Exiles
- Abilities: Electromagnetic energy generation, flight, teleportation

Siena Blaze is a supervillain appearing in American comic books published by Marvel Comics. The character has appeared only in the X-Men line of comics. Her power is to manipulate the electromagnetic spectrum, but she has a very crude level of control, so every usage of this power causes an explosion massive enough to destroy a building. Introduced as a villain in the Marvel Universe, she later became a hero during her brief period in the Ultraverse. Following a long absence, the character returned in X-Force (vol. 3) #22.

Siena Blaze starts out as a member of the thrill-seeking Upstarts, a group of mutants who hunt other mutants for sport. She participates in a single confrontation with members of the X-Men, specifically Cyclops, Professor X, and Storm in Antarctica. She confronts Nightcrawler, Shadowcat, and Rachel Summers of Excalibur. Blaze proves formidable in both encounters, fighting to a draw each time, before parting ways.

She attempts to kill the villain Reaper for the relatively small number of points it would bring her in the 'Upstarts' mutant-slaying competition. The fight is broken up by Amber Hunt, a being from another dimension. Her problems suck in Reaper and Blaze to her home world, where she discovers her powers have somehow been diminished to half of their normal strength. The two join up with the Exiles. Other members include the Juggernaut and Warstrike, a mercenary who dreams of the future. Blaze adapts to the role of hero. For example, she helps rescue two strangers from the grip of an energy entity. She feels a strong attraction to team leader Warstrike. Later, she participates in the battle against the Alien robot Maxis. When the Tulkan armada arrives to Earth, they reveal that they were the ones who caused the damage in New York attributed to the Exiles. The Exiles and Ultraforce defeated the Aliens. After the battle, the robot Maxis opens a portal and she, the Black Knight, and Reaper return to the Marvel Universe, where Siena Blaze regains her full power.

Blaze is later captured and executed by Weapon X. In X-Force #22, Blaze is resurrected via the Transmode virus to serve as part of Selene's army of deceased mutants. Under the control of Selene and Eli Bard, she takes part in the assault on the mutant nation of Utopia.

=== Siena Blaze in other media ===
Siena Blaze appears as a boss in X-Men: Gamesmaster's Legacy.

== Bling! ==
Bling! (Roxanne "Roxy" Washington) is a character appearing in American comic books published by Marvel Comics. She attended the Xavier Institute before its closing and is a member of the X-Men's training squad. Her first appearance was in X-Men (vol. 2) #171. Bling! is a mutant, with her bone marrow able to produce diamond shards giving her skin a durable crystalline body and the ability to expel shards from her body.

Roxy Washington is the daughter of two hip hop artists. Determined not to follow in her parents' footsteps, Washington enrolls as a student at the Xavier Institute and is assigned to Gambit's squad, the Chevaliers. Washington is revealed to be bisexual when she shows attraction toward new student Foxx (Mystique in disguise).

Bling! retained her powers after M-Day. She begins doing field missions, but is intimidated by joining the X-Men. She relocates with the other mutants to San Francisco during Messiah Complex. She later joins the mutant nation of Krakoa. She is a nominee in the 2022 X-Men vote, but lost to Firestar. She also joined the Fallen Angels.

== Blitz ==
Blitz is a character appearing in American comic books published by Marvel Comics.

Jaime Zimmerman was created by Terry Kavanagh and Alex Saviuk, and first appeared in Web of Spider-Man #99 (April 1993). A female member of the New Enforcers, she possessed superhuman strength and agility as well as a heavily armored costume, and Spider-Man was initially unaware of her capabilities. Blitz was ultimately defeated by Spider-Man and Blood Rose.

== Blitzkrieg ==
Blitzkrieg is a character in the Marvel Universe. He was created by Mark Gruenwald, Bill Mantlo, Steven Grant, and John Romita, Jr., and first appeared in Marvel Super-Heroes: Contest of Champions #1 (June 1982).

Franz Mittelstaedt was born in Backnang, Germany. He was inspecting an electrical power plant when a stray bolt of lightning struck a faulty generator and bathed him in electricity. When he emerged from his coma weeks later, he found that he could summon lightning at will to wield as a weapon. He decided to use his powers in the name of democracy.

Later he was teleported away by the Grandmaster, along with hundreds of other heroes of Earth, so that the Grandmaster and Death could choose champions from among them. Blitzkrieg was chosen for the Grandmaster's team, fighting alongside fellow heroes Captain America, Talisman, Darkstar, Captain Britain, Wolverine, Defensor, Sasquatch, Daredevil, Peregrine, She-Hulk, and the Thing. When the Grandmaster's team won the contest, the heroes were returned to Earth.

Blitzkrieg later joined the German superhero team Schutz Heiliggruppe, along with Hauptmann Deutschland and Zeitgeist. The team intended to arrest the Red Skull for his World War II war crimes, assaulting Arnim Zola's castle and fighting and defeating the Skeleton Crew.

Blitzkrieg later traveled to Buenos Aires to investigate the deaths of a number of South American superheroes, including his former ally Defensor. Blitzkrieg was confronted by his teammate Zeitgeist, who turned out to be the serial killer Everyman. Everyman killed Blitzkrieg, adding him to his long list of murdered superheroes, but Blitzkrieg was later avenged by Hauptmann Deutschland, now known as Vormund, who killed Everyman.

Blitzkrieg possessed the ability to summon lightning mentally, at up to 15 million volts. He can manipulate all forms of electrical energy, using them to allow him to fly, create electrical energy shields and cages, and electrical tornadoes. He is also immune to electricity, and can sense electrical transmissions and track them to their source.

== Blockbuster ==
Blockbuster is the name of two characters in Marvel Comics.

=== Michael Baer ===
Blockbuster (Michael Baer) was created by Chris Claremont and Michael Golden and first appeared in The Uncanny X-Men #210. Baer is a mutant with superhuman strength, stamina, durability, and mass. He is a recurring member of the Marauders.

=== Bart Dietzel ===
Bart Dietzel (also known as Blockbuster and Man-Brute) is a supervillain created by Stan Lee and artist Gene Colan, first appearing in Captain America #121 (January 1970). Dietzel is a mutate gifted super strength by an enemy of Captain America. He was later killed by Foolkiller during a conflict with Omega the Unknown.

=== Blockbuster in other media ===
- Michael Baer / Blockbuster makes non-speaking cameo appearances in X-Men: The Animated Series.
- Michael Baer / Blockbuster appears in Wolverine and the X-Men as a member of Mister Sinister's Marauders.
- Michael Baer / Blockbuster appears in Deadpool, voiced by Fred Tatasciore.

== Bloodline ==
Bloodline (Brielle Brooks) was created by Danny Lore and Karen S. Darboe, debuting in Free Comic Book Day 2022: Avengers/X-Men #1 (May, 2022). Bloodline is a dhampir and the daughter of Blade.

Brielle Brooks was born to Eric Brooks (Blade) and Safron Caulder. She grew up without her father or the knowledge of her powers, as Blade made Doctor Strange place a spell on her to protect her from the dangers of being a vampire. Doctor Strange eventually died, the spell wore off, and Brielle's mother contacted Blade, reuniting her with her father. Brielle eventually joined the Avengers Academy.

Bloodline appeared in her own 5-issue limited series in 2023, Bloodline: Daughter of Blade, as well as Avengers Academy: Marvel's Voices, the Blood Hunt event, and is set to appear in X-Orcists.

== Bloodscream ==
Bloodscream is a villain character who first appeared in Wolverine vol. 2 #4 (February 1989), and was created by writer Chris Claremont and artist John Buscema. He was once an unnamed naval surgeon who served in Sir Francis Drake's pirate fleet between 1577 and 1580. In 1580, he is mortally wounded during an attack on a Spanish galleon and Drake personally directs him to be treated by the shaman Dagoo. The shaman, however, is actually a necromancer and is only able to save his life by transforming him into a vampire-like being. Learning that his condition can only be reversed by the blood of an immortal, Bloodscream travels the world in search of one, fighting in any war he can. Bloodscream eventually becomes fixated on Wolverine, who he believes to be immortal.

=== Bloodscream in other media ===
- Bloodscream makes a cameo appearance in the X-Men: The Animated Series episode "Whatever It Takes".
- Bloodscream appears as a boss in Wolverine: Adamantium Rage.

== Bloodshed ==
Bloodshed

Publication information
- Publisher: Marvel Comics
- First appearance: Web of Spider-Man #81 (October 1991)
- Created by: Kurt Busiek; Steven Butler

In-story information
- Alter ego: Wyndell Dichinson
- Species: Human
- Abilities: Trained mercenary Skilled hand to hand combatant Superhuman strength and durability Specialized armored suit grants: Retractable bladed weapons

Bloodshed (Wyndell Dichinson) is a supervillain appearing in American comic books published by Marvel Comics. It is also the name of a supervillain in Marvel's Razorline imprint, as well as a character in comics from an acquired company, Malibu Comics. Bloodshed first appeared in Web of Spider-Man #81 (October 1991), and was created by Kurt Busiek and Steven Butler.

Wyndell Dichinson and his 16-year-old brother are caught in a car theft by the heroic Spider-Man and apprehended by the police. Ricky goes to jail but Wyndell manages to escape and flee the country before his court date takes place. He becomes a mercenary somewhere in the Far East. He begins work in Thailand, where he is approached and employed by Mr. Bazin.

Wyndell fails an American drug smuggling operation for Bazin and ends up deep in debt. He approaches his brother to ask for money; at that point he has only three days left to pay. Bazin became impatient and decided he wanted Bloodshed dead. Wyndell and his brother are confronted by gangsters, which catches the attention of Spider-Man. In the meantime, Bazin had placed a bomb in Ricky's home. It explodes, seemingly erasing all traces of the brothers. Spider-Man presumes them to be dead.

Bloodshed is revealed alive during the "Civil War" event and when the registration law is announced, he decides to leave the country again. He contacts Vienna to make him a new fake identity, but he did not know Vienna is secretly working for the Heroes for Hire, who later apprehend Bloodshed and several other supervillains.

== Bloodstorm ==
Bloodstorm is the name of two characters appearing in American comic books. Both are mutant vampires and alternative reality versions of Storm. The original Bloodstorm debuted in Mutant X, and was created by Howard Mackie and Tom Raney. The younger alternate version who joined the time-displaced X-Men first appeared in X-Men: Blue #10 (August 2017), created by Cullen Bunn and Giovanni Valletta.

Ororo Munroe was turned into a vampire by Dracula while trying to pick-pocket him. She managed to escape his control and joined X-Men of her universe. However, she eventually succumbed to her vampiric nature, killing Professor X and Beast. She adopted Bloodstorm moniker when recruited by a multiversal Goblin Queen for Hex-Men, who attacked time displaced X-Men on Earth-616. Bloodstorm chose to betray Goblin Queen and aided X-Men to defeat her.

Stranded on Earth-616, Bloodstorm joins the time-displaced X-Men on numerous missions and develops mutual romantic feelings for Cyclops. Before their relationship can fully develop, the pair are attacked by Ahab, who kills Bloodstorm.

== Bloodstorm One ==
Bloodstorm One is a clone of Dracula created by Lt. Gregory Belial of Hydra's Department of Occult Affairs as part of an army of vampire shocktroopers. Bloodstorm One escapes Hydra's custody and begins serving Varnae. Bloodstorm One later battles the Nightstalkers, with Frank Drake overloading the Exorcism Gun, the sole weapon that can harm Varnae. This incident fuses Drake, Hannibal King, and Bloodstorm One into an amalgam form resembling Dracula. Blade and his alternate future counterpart Crossbow separate King and Drake from Bloodstorm One's body, which Dracula assumes control of at the cost of Bloodstorm One's life.

== Bloodshocker ==
Bloodshocker

Publication information
- Publisher: Marvel Comics
- First appearance: The New Warriors #17 (Nov. 1991)
- Created by: Fabian Nicieza; Mark Bagley

In-story information
- Full name: Eric Conroy
- Team affiliations: Folding Circle; Thunderbolts
- Abilities: Superhuman strength

Bloodshocker (Eric Conroy) is a supervillain appearing in American comic books published by Marvel Comics.

Eric Conroy's father, Mark Conroy, served in the Vietnam War. Lt. Conroy's unit, calling themselves the Half-Fulls, discovered an ancient temple deep in the jungles of Cambodia and met a mystic named Tai, who convinced most of them to marry the six daughters of the Dragon's Breath cult. The soldiers returned home with their new brides, and Mark and his wife had Eric soon after.

Conroy was once the enforcer for a mobster in Chicago, until the Left Hand killed his boss and recruited him to join the Folding Circle. The Left Hand is Diego Casseas, one of the members of Conroy's unit, who had stolen the mystical power inherent in his own child. Conroy is now recruiting the Dragon's Breath children to take control of the Well of All Things. This ancient fountain of power exists deep inside the Cambodian temple. In one of his first missions, Conroy kills a security guard. This action transforms Conroy's body, giving him unbreakable pink material wraps around his arms, legs, and waist.

The Folding Circle arrives at the temple, along with the New Warriors, and discovers that Tai wants to sacrifice everyone but herself so she can gain the Well's powers. The teams work together to save their own lives, and Tai is seemingly killed by Night Thrasher. The Folding Circle escapes, stealing the New Warriors' Quinjet. The Folding Circle crashes in Madripoor and tries to become a player in the Madripoor underworld, taking over a drug organization. Later, Night Thrasher and Silhouette defeat the entire Circle.

== Bloodtide ==
Bloodtide is an Atlantean and a member of the Fathom Five. Bloodtide's body was "ravaged by pollutants," mutating her, giving her superhuman powers.

== Bloodwraith ==
Bloodwraith (Sean Dolan) is a character in the Marvel Comics universe. He was created by Mark Gruenwald, Dann Thomas, Roy Thomas and Tony DeZuniga, and first appeared in Black Knight #2 (July 1990).

Bloodwraith is the murderous enemy of Black Knight and the Avengers. While Sean Dolan was known as Bloodwraith, Bloodwraith is made up of the souls of those the Ebony Blade has killed. He is an expert swordsman compelled to take lives, especially innocent lives. The blade is indestructible and able to cut through almost any material. The blade was forged from a meteorite and Merlin's magic. The blade can trap dead souls and absorb or deflect all kinds of energies and mystical power. Bloodwraith can sense the ebony blade and control it like a telekinetic. If separated, Bloodwraith can teleport to the Ebony Blade or teleport the blade to himself. Bloodwraith rides a winged horse named Valinor.

Sean Dolan was an amateur swordsman with no special abilities. When Sean drew the ebony blade, he found himself overwhelmed and controlled by all the souls of those the sword had killed, and became the Bloodwraith. The Bloodwraith was dark black in color and appeared in costume. The sword constantly craved new blood to add, and those it slew found their souls locked in an eternal battle of good vs. evil in a dimension inside the sword. Bloodwraith rides his winged horse, Valinor, and is an expert swordsman. He can control the ebony blade rather like a telekinetic. When separated from the blade, he can sense its presence and instantaneously teleport to its location. The ebony blade could slice through anything and, previously, would curse its wielder with petrification if its wielder used the blade to draw blood. When he wielded Proctor's sword, the Bloodwraith and Valinor appeared much more skeletal and could channel powerful blasts through the sword. When powered by the Slorenian souls, Bloodwraith is made of an energy unknown to man, and both he and the sword grew to gigantic size.

== Blue Blade ==
The Blue Blade (real name Roy Chambers) is a character appearing in American comic books published by Marvel Comics. Created by an unknown writer and unknown artist, his only appearance was in USA Comics #5 (cover-dated Summer 1942), published by Marvel forerunner Timely Comics during the period known as the Golden Age of Comic Books. After the 1940s, the character disappeared into obscurity until 2007, when he reappeared in the limited series The Twelve.

== Blue Blaze ==
Blue Blaze (real name Spencer Keen) is a superhero granted enhanced strength, dense skin, increased endurance and an increased life span by a mysterious blue energy source, and appeared in Mystic Comics #1–4.

== Blue Eagle ==
Blue Eagle (James Dore Jr.) is a character appearing in American comic books published by Marvel Comics. Created by writer Roy Thomas and artist John Buscema, Blue Eagle first appeared in The Avengers #85 (February 1971). He has also used the codenames American Eagle, Cap'n Hawk, and Condor. He originates from the alternate universe of Earth-712, rather than the main reality in which most stories in the Marvel Universe take place (Earth-616).

James Dore Jr., who was born in Mayflower, Freedonia on his Earth, was an airplane mechanic. He began his career as a superhero when he inherited the mantle of the American Eagle from his father and joined the Squadron Supreme. Dore abandons the American Eagle identity after a falling out with his father over political differences, eventually taking the name Blue Eagle.

== Blue Streak/Bluestreak ==
Blue Streak (sometimes spelled Bluestreak) is the name of three characters in Marvel Comics.

=== Don Thomas ===
Blue Streak

Publication information
- Publisher: Marvel Comics
- First appearance: Captain America #217 (Dec. 1978)
- Created by: Roy Thomas (Writer); John Buscema (Artist)

In-story information
- Alter ego: Don Thomas
- Team affiliations: S.H.I.E.L.D. Corporation
- Abilities: Jet-skating suit grants: Various built in weapons Rapid healing Ability to skate at superhuman speeds

Blue Streak first appeared in Captain America #217–218 (Jan.–Feb. 1978), created by Roy Thomas, Don Glut, and John Buscema.

S.H.I.E.L.D. decides to put together a group of Super-Agents, of which Blue Streak becomes a member. Blue Streak is later exposed as a spy for the Corporation.

After leaving prison, Blue Streak becomes a professional criminal in the American Midwest. He is invited to join an underground network to locate and eliminate a serial killer who is killing supervillains, but refuses. Shortly afterwards, Blue Streak is killed by the culprit - the Scourge of the Underworld.

Blue Streak is one of the eighteen victims of the Scourge who are resurrected by Hood as part of a squad assembled to eliminate the Punisher. Blue Streak ends up fighting the Punisher's partner Henry instead, who kills him by breaking his neck.

=== Jonathan Swift ===
Blue Streak

Publication information
- Publisher: Marvel Comics
- First appearance: Heroes For Hire (vol. 2) #3 (Dec. 2006)
- Created by: Justin Gray; William Tucci; Jimmy Palmiotti; Francis Portella

In-story information
- Alter ego: Jonathan Swift
- Team affiliations: Fast Five; Ricadonna's Rogues
- Abilities: Jet-skating suit grants: Various built in weapons Ability to skate at 125 miles per hour

Blue Streak (Jonathan Swift) first appeared during the height of the "Civil War" storyline. He is the successor of the original Blue Streak and was a member of Ricadonna's group called Ricadonnna's Rogues alongside Ferocia, Flame, and Kingsize. They were used in an experiment by the Corporation to have Skrull organs grafted to them.

Using money from one of his heists, Blue Streak forms a team of similarly garbed thieves called Fast Five, consisting of Gold Rush, Silver Ghost, Green Light, and Redline.

=== Blue Kelso ===
Blue Kelso, alias Bluestreak, is a member of A-Next. She is brash, uninhibited, and somewhat overconfident, but a solid member of her team. She is a superspeedster whose limits are unknown.

=== Blue Streak in other media ===
An original incarnation of Blue Streak appears in Moon Girl and Devil Dinosaur, voiced by Manny Jacinto. This version is a skating enthusiast named Brian Glory and a founding member of the Felonius Four. In the series finale "Shoot for the Moon", Blue Streak reforms after attending Moon Girl's Good Word Program.

== Boak ==
Boak is a fictional character appearing in American comic books published by Marvel Comics. The character was created by Jim Lee, Chris Claremont and Whilce Portacio, and first appeared in X-Factor #67 (April 1991). A synthcon from a dystopian future timeline, he is a member of Rachel Summers's Clan Askani and Nathan Summers / Cable's Clan Chosen.

=== Boak in other media ===
Boak makes non-speaking appearances in X-Men: The Animated Series.

== Barnell Bohusk ==
Barnell Bohusk

Publication information
- Publisher: Marvel Comics
- First appearance: New X-Men #117 (September 2001)
- Created by: Grant Morrison; Ethan Van Sciver

In-story information
- Species: Human mutant
- Team affiliations: Xavier Institute; Special Class; Brotherhood of Mutants; Street team X-Men; Exiles; New Warriors
- Notable aliases: Beak, Blackwing

Barnell Bohusk, also known as Beak and Blackwing, is a bird-like mutant who attended the Xavier Institute for Higher Learning. There, he develops a close friendship with Beast, bonding over their shared experience of severe physical mutations. He adopts the Beak codename and Beast gifts him a baseball bat. However, Cassandra Nova manipulates Beak into attacking Beast. Although Beast recovers, the incident leaves Beak with lasting guilt.

Beak joins the Special Class, a group of young mutants with limited abilities. The class includes his girlfriend Angel Salvadore, with whom he later has children. The class is mentored by Xorn, who believes himself to be Magneto. Under his influence, Beak joins the Brotherhood of Mutants. Beak eventually rejects Xorn's extremist actions and works with the Street X-Men to defeat him, freeing New York City.

Beak briefly joins the Exiles before reuniting with his family during "M-Day". During the events of M-Day, Beak loses his mutant powers, giving him a human appearance. He goes on to join the New Warriors as Blackwing, using a powered suit that grants him flight, superhuman strength, and Vibranium claws. In the series X-Men Blue, Beak regains his powers and original appearance after being exposed to the drug Mothervine.

Barnell Bohusk has several avian traits, including feathered limbs, a beak, talons, and hollow bones. Despite these features, he lacks the ability to fly but is capable of limited gliding. His talons can be used as weapons, and he possesses enhanced night vision. While not among the most physically powerful mutants, he is noted for his strong interpersonal skills.

=== Reception ===
- In 2014, Entertainment Weekly ranked Beak 54th in their "Let's rank every X-Man ever" list.
- In 2024, CBR ranked Beak 3rd in "12 Weakest X-Men Members" list.
- In 2025, CBR ranked Beak 4th in The 10 "X-Men With the Worst Powers" list (strongest to weakest).

=== Barnell Bohusk in other media ===
Barnell Bohusk makes non-speaking appearances in X-Men '97.

== Ahura Boltagon ==
Ahura Boltagon is the son of Black Bolt and Medusa. After disappearing from publications for many years, the series Silent War reveals he was banished to a prison since he shared his uncle Maximus's mental instability, and all mention of him was forbidden. As a result of Maximus manipulating a war between the United States of America and the Inhumans, Ahura is freed. Maximus states Ahura had nothing wrong with him. The apparent madness was a telepathic illness Maximus had inflicted on him. During the Skrull infiltration, Ahura was abducted by the Skrulls to be used as emotional leverage against his father, Black Bolt. Ahura and Black Bolt were soon freed by their fellow Inhumans. On the Inhumans's return to Earth, Medusa allowed him to join the Future Foundation, but then Black Bolt allowed Ahura to be taken into the past by Kang the Conqueror. Black Bolt returns him and he becomes the new CEO of Ennilux Corporation. Ahura took a fleet of Ennilux zeppelins to help the Inhumans in their clash with the X-Men, and provided them with a device to destroy the Terrigen Mist cloud. In an alternate timeline, Ahura becomes the new Kang.

=== Powers and abilities ===
Ahura has some abilities similar to his father's such as quasi-sonic scream, energy beam, force field generation, and flight. He also possesses psionic powers, enhanced intelligence and memory, power absorption, and soul splitting.

== Bombshell ==
Bombshell is the name of two characters in Marvel Comics.

=== Wendy Conrad ===
Wendy Conrad was born in Scarsdale, New York. She used her juggling talents and explosives expertise to become the supervillain Bombshell. Bombshell, along with juggler Oddball, was hired by Crossfire to eliminate Hawkeye and Mockingbird. The two juggling supervillains were able to subdue the two heroes and deliver them to Crossfire. However, Hawkeye later managed to escape and defeat all three villains.

Bombshell and Oddball, together with Knickknack, Ringleader, and Tenpin, formed the juggling-themed supervillain group Death-Throws. The group are hired by Crossfire to help him escape from prison. When Crossfire was unable to pay them, the Death-Throws held the villain hostage. They were defeated by Hawkeye, Mockingbird and Captain America.

Bombshell underwent a genetic experiment to gain superpowers. She gained the ability to fire explosive energy blasts from her hands. Bombshell then joined an all female team of supervillains called the Femizons. The female team, led by Superia, sought to sterilize all men so women would rule the world. The team was defeated by Captain America. Bombshell's experimental new powers soon faded.

=== Lori and Lana Baumgartner ===
Mother/daughter criminal duo Lori Baumgartner and Lana Baumgartner, who originally existed in the Ultimate Marvel universe, worked together as the Bombshells In their first appearance, the foul-mouthed Bombshells. They attempt to rob a bank vault but are foiled by the original Spider-Man (Peter Parker). Later, they attempt to rob an armored truck until the Human Torch and Spider-Woman arrive on the scene and defeat them.

The Baumgartners were originally believed to be mutants whose powers activated when close to one another. It is later revealed that Lori's powers are the result of experiments carried out by the Roxxon Corporation on Phillip Roxxon's orders while Lana was in-utero. Lori's pregnancy was not noticed until after the experiments and the discovery prompted Lori to forcibly terminate her contract as a test subject utilizing her powers. Lana, having been released on juvenile parole, later teams up with Spider-Woman, Cloak and Dagger and the new Spider-Man (Miles Morales) as an amateur superhero team to take down Donald Roxxon.

After Donald Roxxon is arrested, Lana has a moment of clarity and realizes that she is supposed to be a superhero. It is also revealed that Lana was forced into crime by her mother.

As a consequence of the reality-ending phenomena Secret Wars, Lana's entire universe came to an end, but one of the few survivors of the universe was Miles. After Miles helped the Molecule Man, who was keeping a composite world called Battleworld together, Miles was repaid by bringing his family and friends into Earth-616, in such a way it was as if they had always lived their entire life there; Lana and her mother were among the people brought to Earth-616. Since then, she has acted as both a super-hero and super-villain at different times.

=== Bombshell in other media ===
- The Wendy Conrad incarnation of Bombshell appears in Hawkeye (2021), portrayed by Adetinpo Thomas. This version is a LARPer nicknamed "Bombshell" by her wife. She is later recruited by Kate Bishop to assist her and Clint Barton in their fight against the Tracksuit Mafia.
- The Lana Baumgartner incarnation of Bombshell appears as a playable character in Spider-Man Unlimited.

== B.O. ==
B.O. is an alien who arrived on Earth-8311 and was discovered initially by Orson Whales, who sent him to the Daily Beagle.

== Boomerang ==
Boomerang (Fred Myers) was born in Alice Springs, Northern Territory, Australia, and was raised in the United States. As a young boy he developed a love for baseball, and spent years training and perfecting his pitching arm. By the time he was a young adult, Fred had realized his dream of pitching for a major league team. However, he foolishly began accepting bribes and was drummed out of the major leagues after being discovered. Shortly thereafter, Myers was contacted by the Secret Empire, an international criminal organization that saw the potential of his skills. Myers agreed and was given a new costume and an arsenal of deadly boomerangs, from which he derived his new code name. He battled the Hulk after taking Betty Ross hostage to get plans, but the Hulk rescued Betty. Boomerang fell off a cliff, seemingly to his death.

After the Secret Empire collapsed, Boomerang returned to Australia and laid low for a few years, perfecting his deadly aim and making modifications to his weapons. Once he was ready, he returned to America and began operating as a freelance assassin. Boomerang has been a member of the Sinister Syndicate, the Masters of Evil, the Sinister Twelve, the Heavy Hitters, the Assassins Guild, the Thunderbolts, and the Sinister Six.

=== Boomerang in other media ===
- Boomerang appears in The Marvel Super Heroes, voiced by Ed McNamara.
- Boomerang appears in The Avengers: United They Stand, voiced by Rob Cowan. This version is a member of Helmut Zemo's Masters of Evil.
- Boomerang appears in Ultimate Spider-Man, voiced by Rob Paulsen.
- An alternate universe-displaced incarnation of Boomerang appears in Spider-Man: Across the Spider-Verse.
- Boomerang appears in Spider-Man: Brand New Day, portrayed by an uncredited Aidan Kennedy.
- Boomerang appears as the first boss of The Uncanny X-Men. This version is a mutant with near-perfect throwing accuracy.
- Boomerang appears as a boss in The Amazing Spider-Man and Captain America in Dr. Doom's Revenge!.
- The Ultimate Marvel incarnation of Boomerang appears as a boss in Ultimate Spider-Man.
- Boomerang appears in Marvel Trading Card Game.
- A Marvel Noir-inspired incarnation of Boomerang appears as a boss in the Nintendo DS version of Spider-Man: Shattered Dimensions, voiced by Jim Cummings.
- Boomerang appears as a boss and an unlockable playable character in Marvel: Avengers Alliance.
- Boomerang appears in Marvel: Avengers Alliance 2.
- In 2014, Hasbro released a Boomerang action figure as part of the Marvel Legends action figure line.

== Boomslang ==
Boomslang is a member of the Serpent Society who infiltrated the group along with Coachwhip and Rock Python after Viper's invasion, and stayed with the Society for a short time. He is an excellent hand-to-hand combat fighter, and uses snake-shaped sickles called "serpent-rangs" as his weapon of choice. Boomslang is considered incompetent among the other members of the Serpent Society.

Boomslang, along with Cobra and Copperhead, is sent to poison the water supply, turning civilians into snake creatures. They are eventually found out by Diamondback and Captain America, and Boomslang is quickly taken care of by Captain America's shield. Boomslang is instructed to watch over Diamondback; when Captain America discovers his presence, Boomslang flees and is attacked by thugs. Captain America takes Boomslang to a hospital. Boomslang survives this incident and is later seen attending an A.I.M. weapons expo.

== Bor ==
- Further reading: Bor at the Comic Book DB (archived from the original)

Bor Burison is an Asgardian in the Marvel Universe. The character, created by Stan Lee and Jack Kirby and named for Borr from Norse mythology, first appeared in Journey into Mystery #97 (October 1963).

Bor, son of Buri, became the ruler of Asgard where under his rule he created the universe. He eventually married the giantess Bestla and had four sons with her named Cul, Vili, Ve and Odin. Out of all of his sons, Bor paid special attention to Odin, whom he groomed to become the next king. However, Bor was angered by Odin's decision to create humans, which he was unable to reverse. Nevertheless, Bor strongly sided with Odin and the two went into battle against the Frost Giants. Bor went up against one giant, who was actually a time traveling Loki in disguise, and battled him, but was killed.

During the "Dark Reign" storyline, Loki resurrected Bor in modern day, but affected his mind making him think that monsters were everywhere. He encountered his grandson Thor and the two fought in a destructive battle that involved the Dark Avengers. Bor was killed by Thor, who only found out about his identity afterwards from Loki and Balder.

=== Bor in other media ===
Bor appears in Thor: The Dark World, portrayed by Tony Curran.

== Melissa Bowen ==
- Further reading: Melissa Bowen at the Comic Book DB (archived from the original); Melissa Bowen at the Grand Comics Database

Melissa Bowen is the mother of Tandy Bowen (the superhero known as Dagger) in Marvel Comics. The character, created by Bill Mantlo and Rick Leonardi, first appeared in Cloak and Dagger #4 (January 1984). The character, a wealthy socialite, was depicted as being very emotionally distant from Tandy. When Tandy runs away, Melissa is irritated at her daughter due to the cost of hiring people to search for her.

=== Melissa Bowen in other media ===
Melissa Bowen appears in Cloak & Dagger, portrayed by Andrea Roth. This version is an alcoholic and drug pusher and has been working low-paying jobs that she is repeatedly fired from.

== Boy-Spider ==
Boy-Spider is a clone of Spider-Boy who was created by Madame Monstrosity from the DNA sample of Bailey Briggs. Initially resembling a humanoid spider, Boy-Spider later gains the ability to assume a humanoid form and is adopted by Bailey's mother Tabitha.

When Bailey discovers Boy-Spider posing as him, they fight until Tabitha interrupts and has a word with them. When Tabitha calls Mr. Cricket about Boy-Spider, he tells her that Boy-Spider running away is the least of his problems and that the Humanimals need help to sell the Stillwell Farm's produce since they are seen as monsters. After helping Spider-Boy fight off the Bada Bros, who attacked the F.E.A.S.T. Center on Killionaire's orders, Boy-Spider helps the Humanimals sell produce, allowing Tabitha to divide time between the Stillwell Farm and East Village.

== Chris Bradley ==
Chris Bradley Bolt

Publication information
- Publisher: Marvel Comics
- First appearance: X-Men Unlimited #8 (Oct. 1995)
- Created by: Howard Mackie (writer), Tom Grummett, Dan Lawlis (co-artists)

In-story information
- Alter ego: Christopher Bradley
- Species: Human mutant
- Team affiliations: New Warriors; Underground; Gene Nation; New Mutants
- Notable aliases: Bolt, Maverick
- Abilities: Able to generate and control electricity (electrokinesis)

Christopher Bradley, formerly known as Bolt and Maverick, is a character appearing in American comic books published by Marvel Comics, in particular those featuring the X-Men. He is a young mutant who first appeared in X-Men Unlimited #8.

Chris Bradley was first introduced as a young boy who began suffering from increasingly painful headaches. The headaches resulted from his electrical mutant powers, which manifested and grew out of control in the middle of a class at school, leaving him unconscious. He was rescued by Jean Grey and Gambit, who had been sent by Professor Xavier to keep an eye on him and approach him should his powers reveal themselves. After taking him home, the X-Men offered him training at the Xavier Institute for Higher Learning. At first Chris was reluctant, but after being shunned by his best friend, agreed to join the school.

Chris spent several weeks at the school, quickly developing close friendships with the X-Men, particularly Iceman, whose own youthful personality seemed to connect well with Chris'. However, when Beast ran a medical test on Chris, it was revealed that he was infected with the Legacy Virus, which would eventually kill him. Chris was afraid of what his future would hold, but Iceman and the other X-Men offered him aid should he ever need it.

When Maverick disappears and was believed dead, Chris takes the Maverick alias for himself and joins the Underground, a group founded by Cable to battle Weapon X and expose its existence. Following the group's defeat, Chris remains in the Underground, though it was taken over by Marrow and remade into a new incarnation of the extremist mutant supremacist group Gene Nation. Chris did not leave as he wanted to undermine Gene Nation from within and prevent its terrorist attacks, though he is ultimately killed by his former mentor himself, now bearing the codename "Agent Zero", who did not find out Chris had been Maverick until after he has died.

=== Chris Bradley in other media ===
Chris Bradley appears in X-Men Origins: Wolverine, portrayed by Dominic Monaghan. This version is an English mutant and member of Team X with the ability to remotely control and power electricity-powered objects as well as telepathically send and receive radio transmissions. Six years after Team X disbands, Bradley finds work with a circus in Springfield, Ohio until he is murdered by Victor Creed.

== Sandi Brandenberg ==
Sondra "Sandi" Brandenberg is an ally of Deadpool that first appeared in Taskmaster #1 (February 2002) by Gail Simone. Debuting as a brief love affair for Taskmaster, Sandi was shot by a Triad gang member. After recovering in hospital, she became the secretary to Deadpool, while also retaining a connection to Taskmaster. She subsequently aided Agent X, appearing in his series, and then also appeared in Cable & Deadpool.

== Ellen Brandt ==
- Further reading: Ellen Brandt at the Comic Book DB (archived from the original); Ellen Brandt at the Grand Comics Database

Ellen Brandt is a supporting character in Marvel Comics. The character, created by Roy Thomas, Gerry Conway and Gray Morrow, first appeared in Savage Tales #1 (May 1971). She is the love interest of the Man-Thing.

Brandt grew up in a loveless, emotionless household which she had hoped to escape. She later meets Ted Sallis and the two ran away together so they could elope. The two visited a fortune teller for fun who informed them that tragedy would soon befall them. Sallis soon began working for S.H.I.E.L.D. and became lost in work, causing her to see Sallis as cold as her father. Brandt then joined A.I.M. and plotted against her husband. When she revealed her true colors, she chased Sallis into a swamp where the latter used an untested recreation of the Super-Soldier Formula, crashed his car into the swamp, and turned into the Man-Thing. Brandt was frightened of her husband's new appearance and abilities, which burned off half of her face.

=== Ellen Brandt in other media ===
- Ellen Brandt appears in Iron Man 3, portrayed by Stéphanie Szostak. This version is a war veteran who lost her arm in battle before A.I.M. founder Aldrich Killian injects her with the Extremis virus, which grants enhanced regenerative capabilities. She works with Eric Savin to attack Tony Stark before being killed by him.
- The Iron Man 3 iteration of Ellen Brandt appears as a playable character in Lego Marvel's Avengers.

== Bres ==
Bres

Publication information
- Publisher: Marvel Comics
- First appearance: Avengers #225 (November 1982)
- Created by: Steven Grant; Greg LaRocque

In-story information
- Alter ego: Bres
- Species: God/Demon
- Team affiliations: Fomor

Bres is a fictional character in the Marvel Universe.

=== Publication history ===
Bres first appeared in Avengers #225-226 (November-December 1982), and was created by Steven Grant and Greg LaRocque.

The character subsequently appears in Power Man and Iron Fist #113 (January 1985).

=== Fictional character biography ===
Bres is a member of the Fomor, extradimensional beings of the 12th century AD. Bres possesses magical powers, second sight, and superhuman strength. He is the son of Fomor warcheif Elathan. After fighting the Avengers, he was taken captive and detained in Project Pegasus headquarters.

Bres uses his powers to manipulate the staff at the Project Pegasus facility, causing guard Harry Winslow to die of heart failure. Bres then uses his magic to animate Winslow's corpse, who kills Solarr. The Falcon, Iron Fist, and Guardsman confront Bres and defeat his scheme to break free.

== Bride of Nine Spiders ==
- Further reading: Bride of Nine Spiders at the Comic Book DB (archived from the original); Bride of Nine Spiders at the Grand Comics Database

Bride of Nine Spiders is a Nepalese member of the Immortal Weapons who possesses pale skin and cold blood. She participates in the Seven Capital Cities of Heaven, where she was forced to face off against other participants. When the life of Iron Fist is threatened by Zhou Cheng, Bride of Nine Spiders stands with Iron Fist along with the other Immortal Weapons.

Much like Iron Fist, most of her abilities stem from her chi. She can control swarms of spiders and hosts many of them inside her body. She is a master of martial arts and wears a spiked collar that she can use as a weapon.

=== Bride of Nine Spiders in other media ===
Bride of Nine Spiders appears in Iron Fist, portrayed by Jane Kim. This version is a Korean arachnologist and associate of Madame Gao whose real name is Alessa.

== Jeremy Briggs ==
Jeremy Briggs is a young boy with matter manipulation abilities who started out among the young superhumans captured by Norman Osborn during his time running H.A.M.M.E.R. and the Initiative.

== Britannia ==
Britannia is a member of the new UK Marvel superhero team The Union. It has been released that Britannia is the leader of The Union; however, Britannia's powers have not yet been released to the public.

== Carl Brock ==
- First appearance: The Amazing Spider-Man #375 (March 1993)
- Created by: David Michelinie, Mark Bagley
- Species: Human
- Further reading: Carl Brock at the Comic Book DB (archived from the original); Carl Brock at the Grand Comics Database

Carl Brock is a character in Marvel Comics. He was created by David Michelinie and Mark Bagley, and first appeared in The Amazing Spider-Man #375 (March 1993). He is Eddie Brock's father.

Carl was a businessman who lacked any form of emotion, until he met his love Jamie. They soon married and decided to have a family, but Jamie died when giving birth to their son Eddie. Carl would be cold and unloving towards Eddie, generally ignoring and only giving half-hearted compliments to his son. Eddie tried everything to gain his father's affection but it was never enough. Things only became worse after the teenaged Eddie got drunk and accidentally ran over a neighbor's young son while driving with friends to which Carl went near bankrupt when he used most of his money to cover the incident, causing his resentment towards his son to increase. Carl ultimately disowned Eddie after journalist was fired due to the Sin-Eater hoax. His son bonded with the Venom symbiote and turned into an anti-hero which was not enough to impress Carl as Peter Parker / Spider-Man tried to question Carl about Eddie but Carl refused to give any information.

Anne Weying had gotten mysteriously pregnant with Eddie's child, leaving their son Dylan Brock with Carl who raised the boy as his own. Despite providing Dylan with a degree of love, Carl was abusive and even injured his grandson. When Eddie returned to his father, Carl did not attempt to help his son and ordered Dylan to go inside home as the Maker's agents recaptured Eddie. Eddie came back and again tried to seek amends with his father, but Carl angrily told Eddie to leave as he did not consider Eddie as his son. Dylan thought that Eddie was an older brother and went to Eddie to know but Dylan sent Eddie to the hospital; however, Carl arrived and forced Dylan to get in the car. When Dylan tried to argue and saw Eddie as a great person, Carl was about to lash out, but Venom's humanoid form confronted Carl inside their minds and Venom left Carl in the desert all alone.

During the "Amazing Spider-Man/Venom: Death Spiral" storyline, Carl Brock is murdered by Torment.

=== Carl Brock in other media ===
Edward Brock Sr. appears in Ultimate Spider-Man, voiced by Terrence Stone. This version tested the Venom suit personally while on the plane that he lost control of, which led to his and Richard Parker's deaths.

== Dylan Brock ==
- First appearance: Venom (Vol. 4) #7 (October 2018)
- Created by: Donny Cates, Ryan Stegman
- Species: Human/Symbiote Hybrid
- Further reading: Dylan Brock at the Grand Comics Database

Dylan Brock is a character appearing in American comic books published by Marvel Comics. He was created by Donny Cates and Ryan Stegman, and first appears in Venom (Vol. 4) #7. Dylan is the son of Anne Weying, the Venom symbiote, and Eddie Brock. Left with Eddie's abusive father Carl Brock as an infant, Dylan was raised to believe he was Carl's son and Eddie's younger half-brother. After a falling out with the Venom symbiote over it manipulating his memories, Eddie took Dylan with him to protect him from Carl's abuse while keeping their relationship a secret.

During Absolute Carnage it was revealed that Dylan possessed powers similar to Knull's, and was not Eddie's biological son but a human-symbiote hybrid created by Anne Weying's symbiote codex impregnating her. Dylan attempted to conceal these powers from Eddie, befriending Normie Osborn while he and Eddie were staying with Liz Allan and Harry Osborn, but was forced to use his abilities to save Eddie and the Venom symbiote from being corrupted by Carnage. Knull later reveals that the Symbiote Hive had created Dylan to destroy and replace him as the King in Black.

=== Other versions ===
In Venom (Vol. 4)'s "Venom Beyond" arc, Earth-616's Eddie Brock and Dylan Brock are sent to Earth-1051, a universe whose version of Eddie committed suicide while Anne Weying became Venom. Anne eventually became mysteriously pregnant and gave birth to a son named Dylan. However, Dylan fell under the sway of the dark god Knull and was corrupted into his apostle, Codex. Under Knull's influence, Dylan conquered the Earth using a horde of cloned symbiotes but was ultimately defeated when his Earth-616 counterpart severed his connection to Knull. In Death of the Venomverse, the Earth-1051 version of Dylan—erroneously drawn as a child—dons Mac Gargan's cast-off Virus armour to aid his Anne in fighting the Earth-616 incarnation of Carnage, who had attained godhood and was travelling the Multiverse killing versions of Venom. However, Dylan was fatally injured by Carnage, surviving just long enough to send the surviving Venoms back to their home dimensions.

In Carnage: Black, White & Blood #4, a version of Earth-1051's Dylan who had been taken over by the Carnage symbiote is introduced, seeking revenge on another version of Dylan. This Carnage-ized Codex almost succeeds in killing Dylan, but is defeated using his King in Black powers.

In Extreme Venomverse #3, a female cavewoman version of Dylan named Dilann is introduced. Exiled from her tribe due to being seen as cursed, she bonded to the Venom symbiote to become the Black Fang and was eventually recruited by Anne to help fight the Carnage of Earth-616. However, Dilann was ultimately killed.

== Broker ==
The Broker is a character appearing in American comic books published by Marvel Comics. The character–created by writers Dan Abnett and Andy Lanning, and artist Jim Cheung–made his first appearance in Force Works #15 (July 1995).

=== Broker in other media ===
- The Broker appears in the Marvel Cinematic Universe (MCU) films Guardians of the Galaxy (2014) and Guardians of the Galaxy Vol. 3 (2023), portrayed by Christopher Fairbank.
- The Broker, based on the MCU incarnation, appears in Guardians of the Galaxy (2015).

== Nicholas Bromwell ==
Nicholas Bromwell is a doctor and friend of Peter Parker and May Parker.

=== Nicholas Bromwell in other media ===
Nicholas Bromwell appears in The Spectacular Spider-Man, voiced by Dorian Harewood. This version is an African-American.

== Bronze ==
Bronze (Trista Marshall) is a mutant character published by Marvel Comics. Bronze first appeared in Exceptional X-Men #1 (September 2024) and was created by Eve Ewing and Carmen Carnero.

Bronze is a young mutant from America with an interest in fandom culture who can transform her skin into a bronze-colored metal which grants her superhuman strength and durability as well as retractable cables extending from her body. She meets Kitty Pryde outside a concert when she is harassed and nearly shot by a bouncer. Bronze joins with Kitty and Emma Frost as their new mentee, alongside young mutants Axo and Melee.

== Broo ==
- First appearance: Astonishing X-Men (vol. 3) #40 (2004)
- Species: Brood mutant
- Further reading: Broo at the Comic Book DB (archived from the original)

Broo is a character from Marvel Comics. He is a mutant from the Brood extraterrestrial race, but unlike his feral brethren he is intelligent and compassionate. Broo was born in the lab on a S.W.O.R.D. orbital research station called Pandora's Box. He joined the X-Men as a student in Wolverine & the X-Men #1.

He has been the object of bullying because of his odd behavior; however, he does not seem to understand teasing and even takes it as a compliment. He has developed a relationship with Idie Okonkwo (Oya), and was at the top in his class behind Quentin Quire.

After discovering a robot placed there by the Hellfire Club to manipulate Oya, Kade Kilgore and Maximilian Frankenstein tell Broo about their plans, but he is shot and left for dead before he can tell anyone else. Beast saves his life with assistance by Brand, Peter Parker, Reed Richards, and Tony Stark. Broo was treated and put into a coma, and once he awoke, he had reverted to his feral brood instincts and acted like that of an animal. While on Xanto Starblood's ship, Broo bites a Bamf and is healed, restoring his original personality.

Broo is a Brood mutant because he can feel compassion and has high intelligence. Like the rest of the Brood, Broo has several powers, including enhanced strength, enhanced speed, enhanced agility, ability to breathe in space, and insect-like wings that allow him to fly. His increased intelligence has resulted in funding for his beloved school; Broo has developed a line of pastries that cause the consumer to lose weight.

== Vanessa Brooks ==
Tara Vanessa Cross-Brooks is a character in Marvel Comics. Created by Marv Wolfman and Gene Colan, the character first appeared in Tomb of Dracula #13 (July 1973). She is the mother of Eric Brooks / Blade. Brooks was an heiress seeking sanctuary with Madame Vanity of the Order of Tyrana. During childbirth, Deacon Frost (posing as a doctor) killed her by drinking all of her blood while turning the boy into a part-vampire. Brooks is later resurrected as a vampire by Dracula to use against Blade but is destroyed.

=== Vanessa Brooks in other media ===
- A character inspired by Vanessa Brooks named Miriam the Vampire Queen appears in the Spider-Man: The Animated Series episode "The Vampire Queen", voiced by Nichelle Nichols. She is an ambitious vampire who incurs the wrath of Blade and Morbius. After draining people of plasma, she assembles the Neogenic Recombinator to turn everyone in New York into vampires. However, her plan is foiled by Blade, Morbius, Spider-Man, Black Cat, Terri Lee, and Abraham Whistler, though Miriam manages to escape.
- Vanessa Brooks appears in Blade (1998), portrayed by Sanaa Lathan.
- Vanessa Brooks makes a flashback appearance in Marvel Anime: Blade.

== Brothers Grimm ==
The first appearance of the first Brothers Grimm came in Spider-Woman #3. These were a pair of identical, magically animated mannequins created by doll collector Nathan Dolly (also known as Mister Doll) and his wife Priscilla. During their initial appearances only one was ever seen at a time and the singular identity, Brother Grimm was used instead of their true plural name. After three return appearances in Spider-Woman, they died in issue #12.

Although the characters were introduced while Marv Wolfman was writing Spider-Woman, their origin and identities were not revealed until Mark Gruenwald's run on the series. Questioned as to whether he had told Gruenwald the characters' origin or Gruenwald had come up with it himself, Wolfman admitted that he could not even remember if the origin he had envisioned for the characters was the same as the one ultimately used by Gruenwald, except that "Brother Grimm" actually being two people was his intention from the beginning. Though Wolfman could not remember how the Brothers Grimm were created, he has said he is confident that they were designed by penciler Carmine Infantino: "I usually gave the artist a concept of what I wanted and then let them have a field day with it. Carmine created brilliant designs in The Flash, so I would certainly have bowed to his expertise."

The second Brothers Grimm appeared in Iron Man #188. They later join the group Night Shift alongside other lesser-known villains.

== Bennington Brown ==
Bennington Brown is a character created by Stan Lee and Jack Keller who appears in American comic books published by Marvel Comics, particularly its Old West-themed comic titles. He is a recurring enemy of Kid Colt.

Bennington Brown was a hypnotist who lived in the Wild West era, making his living by brazenly robbing banks and stagecoaches. His usual modus operandi was using his hypnotic powers to make his victims forget what he did to them, or testify to the authorities in his favor. If confronted, he would use his ability to create illusions in his victims' mind to distract them or slow their reaction time, allowing him to outdraw them. When Kid Colt encountered him and learned of Brown's tricks, he avoided eye contact during their confrontation, and a shot from his revolver caused Brown's gun to explode, temporarily blinding him.

After having regained his eyesight, Brown, as well as Doctor Danger and Fat Man, were contacted by Iron Mask, who assembled them to rob the town of Phoenix disguised as circus performers. However, the gang was defeated by Kid Colt.

== Brute ==
Brute is the name of several characters appearing in American comic books published by Marvel Comics.

=== Morlock ===
Brute and Hump are brothers and members of the Morlocks. Created by Louise Simonson, Fabian Nicieza, and Rob Liefeld, they first appeared in New Mutants #91 (May 1990).

Brute and Hump are mutants who possess green skin and hair, and superhuman strength. They accompanied Masque in her plot to kill Sabretooth for his involvement in the "Mutant Massacre", but failed to kill him. Brute and Hump had Feral in their clutches only for her to get away. Brute is killed by Cable after threatening him causing Hump and Masque to take their leave.

Brute was later revived offscreen and joined Hump and the Morlocks in Lowtown, Madripoor. They later fought the Reavers.

In Dark X-Men (vol. 2), Brute and Hump are among the Morlocks killed by an Orchis-controlled Archangel after the fall of Krakoa.

=== Personality construct ===
An unnamed female Brute is a personality construct with super-strength and a minion of Bagdal.

== Brynocki ==
Brynocki is a toy-like robot created by Mordillo, an insane assassin and adversary of Shang-Chi. Mordillo's intent is for Brynocki to serve as his assistant and comic relief. Brynocki has the ability to instantly change the appearance of his clothing and his choice of clothes reflects his emotional state of the moment.

== Bullet ==
Bullet is the name of two characters appearing in Marvel Comics.

=== Buck Cashman ===
Bullet first appeared in Daredevil #250 (January 1988), and was created by Ann Nocenti and John Romita Jr.

In his initial appearance, Buck Cashman is a U.S. government agent who participates in a scheme on the Kingpin's behalf. Bullet attacks the environmental protection organization "Save the Planet". Matt Murdock / Daredevil confronts Bullet both times, and the two fight. Bullet realized that Daredevil was the man who fought him previously but does not know the costumed crimefighter's true identity. Bullet confesses to his crimes, but manages to have all charges against him dropped. Due to his actions as a mercenary, Bullet has his American citizenship revoked.

Bullet later appears as a member of Hank Pym's Lethal Legion.

=== MC2 version ===
In the "MC2" reality, Bullet is a member of Wizard's Warriors. He wields weaponized pellets given to him by Wizard, consisting of concussion charges, gas bombs, and "high-explosive" power pellets.

=== Bullet in other media ===
Buck Cashman appears in Daredevil: Born Again, portrayed by Arty Froushan. This version works for Mayor Wilson Fisk as a fixer and has a history with James Wesley.

== Bumbler ==
The Bumbler is a bee-themed criminal who encounters Miles Morales several times throughout his career.

In the storyline "Gang War", Bumbler gains control of Bedford–Stuyvesant within New York City's criminal underworld. Bumbler and his gang called the Buzz Boys, which includes another wannabe criminal named Vespa, engage in a destructive turf war with the Frost Pharaoh and his Ankh-Colytes. They are defeated by Spider-Man and the Daughters of the Dragon.

The Bumbler possesses bee-themed gadgets and weapons, including armor equipped with flight wings and can produce electric shocks, "Honeybombs" that generate honey and high-tech firearms.

== Sonny Burch ==
- Further reading: Sonny Burch at the Grand Comics Database

Sonny Burch is a character in Marvel Comics. The character, created by writer John Jackson Miller and artist Jorge Lucas, first appeared in Iron Man (vol. 3) #73 (December 2003).

As chairman of Cross Technological Enterprises, he acquires Iron Man's technology patents to be sold to various companies to improve his own political position. However, Burch had neither the knowledge nor care to fully understand that even Iron Man's outdated technology is too sophisticated for adapting; examples of Burch's incompetence include a submarine where Iron Man and Captain America save the military personnel, a missile defense system for the U.S. Government, and Oscorp's imperfect battlesuits and military drones. Technological mistakes threaten a cargo plane carrying Iron Man's various armors (which were salvaged after blackmailing Carl Walker) to crash into Washington, D.C., resulting in Burch taking a gun and committing suicide. Iron Man saves the plane's personnel and guides it into a controlled crash-landing.

=== Sonny Burch in other media ===
- Sonny Burch appears in media set in the Marvel Cinematic Universe (MCU), portrayed by Walton Goggins.
  - First appearing in Ant-Man and the Wasp, this version is a black market dealer and restaurant owner.
  - An American frontier-themed alternate timeline version of Burch appears in the What If...? episode "What If... 1872?". This version is a servant of the Hood who killed Kate Bishop's parents and possesses a hypnotic watch.
  - Burch will appear in Armor Wars.

== Burglar ==
The Burglar is a character appearing in American comic books published by Marvel Comics. Created by writer Stan Lee and artist Steve Ditko, he first appeared in Amazing Fantasy #15 (August 1962). The character was left unnamed in most of his appearances. The Burglar is the first criminal faced by Spider-Man and is best known as the killer of the hero's uncle and surrogate father figure, Ben Parker.

Little of the Burglar's early history is known, but it is mentioned that even in his younger years he was a robber. Caught at some point in his life, he became the cellmate of an elderly gangster named Dutch Mallone. Wanting to find the location of Mallone's money stash, the Burglar robs a television station for information. Peter Parker, who has become a minor celebrity as Spider-Man, does not bother to stop him despite having the opportunity to do so. Learning that the house where Mallone's money has been hidden is the Parker residence, the Burglar breaks in to search for the money, killing Peter's uncle Ben Parker in the process. Wanting to avenge the death of his Uncle Ben, Spider-Man attacks and knocks out the Burglar. It is then that Spider-Man realizes the man is the same thief he encountered earlier at the television station. The Burglar is ultimately left to be captured by the authorities after Spider-Man realizes he could have prevented Ben's death. He decides to begin using his powers responsibly, never again ignoring a crime if he can help it.

Years later, the Burglar has served his time and is released from prison despite being deemed mentally unstable by psychiatrists. Still searching for Mallone's treasure, the Burglar rents the old Parker home. After tearing it apart and finding nothing, he instead decides to interrogate Ben Parker's widow May, who now resides in a nursing home. The Burglar partners with the nursing home's owner and head doctor, Ludwig Rinehart, who is actually the supervillain Mysterio. The two take May captive and fake her death. The partnership later sours and the two criminals turn on each other, with Rinehart revealing his true nature before beating and imprisoning the Burglar. Escaping Mysterio, the Burglar retreats to the warehouse where he was first captured by Spider-Man—and where he has been holding May captive. Spider-Man soon tracks down and confronts the Burglar, to whom he reveals his true identity as Ben Parker's nephew. Believing that Spider-Man is about to kill him as revenge for murdering Ben, the Burglar suffers a fear-induced heart attack and dies.

The Burglar is later revealed to have a daughter named Jessica Carradine, a photographer who had a brief relationship with Spider-Man's clone Ben Reilly. She believed the murder her father had committed was an accident—that the gun Ben Parker was shot with was his own, which went off by accident during a fight—and that Spider-Man had killed him to cover up the truth about his "innocence". After learning that Ben Reilly is Spider-Man, Jessica threatens to expose him with a photograph she took of him unmasked. After witnessing Ben risk his life to save innocent people from a burning skyscraper, however, she decides against it and gives him the photograph. Jessica later visits Ben Parker's grave to apologize for her previous poor perception of him.

=== The Burglar in other media ===
- The Burglar appears in the Spider-Man (1967) episode "The Origin of Spider-Man", voiced by an uncredited actor.
- The Burglar makes a non-speaking appearance in a flashback in the Spider-Man (1981) episode "Arsenic and Aunt May".
- The Burglar appears in a flashback in the Spider-Man and His Amazing Friends episode "Along Came Spidey", voiced by an uncredited actor.
- The Burglar makes a non-speaking appearance in a flashback in the Spider-Man: The Animated Series episode "The Menace of Mysterio".
- The Burglar appears in the opening sequence of Spider-Man Unlimited.
- The Burglar, amalgamated with Walter Hardy, appears in The Spectacular Spider-Man, voiced by Jim Cummings in the episode "Intervention" and James Remar in the episode "Opening Night".
- The Burglar makes two non-speaking appearances in the Ultimate Spider-Man episodes "Great Power" and "Kraven the Hunter". After killing Ben Parker, he is cornered in an alley by Spider-Man, who intends to kill him but is unable to bring himself to do it and instead leaves him for the police.
- The Burglar appears in the Spider-Man (2017) "Origins" shorts, voiced by Benjamin Diskin. This version is caught by Spider-Man at an abandoned warehouse, which is surrounded by the police. Spider-Man attacks him, but stops upon recognizing him. Using the opportunity to break free from Spider-Man's grip, the shaken Burglar runs out of the warehouse and immediately surrenders to the police.
- The Burglar appears in Sam Raimi's Spider-Man trilogy, portrayed by Michael Papajohn.
  - In Spider-Man (2002), he is credited as Carjacker. He robs a fight promoter who cheated Peter Parker out of a cash reward. Wanting to get even, Peter lets the robber go despite having the chance to stop him. After his Uncle Ben is killed, Peter chases who he believes is the murderer and discovers the robber he let go earlier. The carjacker attempts to shoot him, but ends up tripping and falling to his death.
  - In Spider-Man 3, he is credited as Dennis Carradine. The Parker family learn that the carjacker was not Ben's killer. Instead, it was Carradine's partner, Flint Marko, who accidentally shot Ben when the former startled him.
- The Burglar appears in The Amazing Spider-Man, portrayed by Leif Gantvoort. This version robs a convenience store and kills Ben Parker after accidentally running into him on the street, causing him to drop his gun. Although Peter Parker attempts to track down Ben's killer, he is unsuccessful and eventually abandons his search.
- The Burglar appears as the first boss of the Spider-Man film tie-in game, voiced by Dan Gilvezan. This version, also known as Spike, is the ringleader of the Skulls, a gang specializing in stealing and selling automobiles on the black market. Pursued by the police, Spike and his gang take refuge in a warehouse, which Spider-Man infiltrates to confront his Uncle Ben's killer. After defeating the Skulls, Spider-Man faces Spike and recognizes him, realizing his earlier inaction led to Ben's death. As Spike attempts to back away, he stumbles and falls through a window to his death.
- The Burglar appears in The Amazing Spider-Man 2 film tie-in game, voiced by Chris Edgerly. Two years after his Uncle Ben's death, Spider-Man resumes his search for the killer, who is identified as Dennis Carradine, a low-level thug selling advanced weaponry to gangs. When Spider-Man finally confronts him, Carradine steals a car to escape and takes the driver hostage. Spider-Man rescues the driver before Carradine crashes the car and is subsequently killed by Cletus Kasady.

== Burner ==
Burner is a character appearing in American comic books published by Marvel Comics.

Byron Calley was born in Secaucus, New Jersey. He became a professional criminal as Burner after developing pyrokinesis and was recruited by Magneto into his second Brotherhood of Mutants team. He battled Captain America in his first mission with the Brotherhood. Next, the team renamed itself Mutant Force when Magneto abandoned them.

Some time later, Mutant Force became the Resistants, a mutant terrorist group in opposition to the Mutant Registration Act, and mutant rights activists. Burner changed his name to Crucible during his time with the Resistants. The Resistants rescued the mutant Quill from the custody of then-current fifth Captain America and Bucky. The Resistants then rescued Mentallo from the Guardsmen's custody, and battled Captain America and Bucky again. During the battle, Crucible was accidentally non-fatally shot by Mentallo (who had taken the name Think-Tank). Crucible was later seen trying to bring down Captain America at the behest of the Red Skull, but was severely injured in the fight. Apparently recovered, he was later among the Resistants protesting in Washington for mutant rights, where he encountered the original Captain America.

He was later seen, again as Burner and part of Mutant Force, fighting against the New Warriors but was defeated by the young heroes.

== Noah Burstein ==
Noah Burstein is a scientist who worked on recreating the super soldier serum that created Captain America, and in the process created Warhawk. Years later, Burstein would hire Luke Cage to capture Warhawk. He landed a job at Seagate Prison experimenting on inmates one of them being Carl Lucas. He left Lucas in an "Electro-Biochemical System" when racist guard, Billy Bob Rackham, came to sabotage the experiment only for it to increase Lucas' strength and durability. He is later hired at the Storefront Clinic with Claire Temple as his assistant. He reunites with Lucas, who had changed his name to Luke Cage, and asks him to rescue Claire when she is kidnapped by Willis Stryker who now went by Diamondback.

Burstein and Claire are later kidnapped by John McIver, who demanded that a similar treatment be done to him as was done to Luke Cage, becoming Bushmaster. He and Claire are later rescued by Cage. At one point Bushmaster returns to force Burstein to work for him even kidnapping his wife, Emma, as leverage. Both he and his wife are saved by Iron Fist this time. He would continue to be kidnapped by criminals only for Luke Cage and Iron Fist to come and rescue him.

=== Noah Burstein in other media ===
Noah Burstein appears in Luke Cage, portrayed by Michael Kostroff.

== Butane ==
Butane was created by Alan Davis and first appeared in Excalibur #64 (February 1993).

Butane was transformed by Mad Jim Jaspers's powers and became a fiery humanoid. Like other "Warpies", he was tracked down by government agency R.C.X. (the Resources Control Executive); supposedly this was for their own safety, but in truth R.C.X. head Nigel Orpington-Smythe intended for them to be trained to become a superhuman army.

=== Butane in other media ===
Butane appears in the Your Friendly Neighborhood Spider-Man episode "The Parker Luck", voiced by Jake Green. This version is a human arsonist who wields high-tech flamethrowers he received from Otto Octavius.

== Butterball ==
Butterball is the name of two characters in Marvel Comics.

=== Emery Schaub ===
Emery Schaub is a superhero in the Marvel Comics universe. The character, created by Christos Gage and Steve Uy, first appeared in Avengers: The Initiative #13 (2008).

Emery Schaub was originally a fry cook from Morganton, North Carolina who developed invulnerability. He was later recruited to the Initiative program and given the codename Boulder. However, his drill sergeant Taskmaster nicknames him Butterball, deeming it more appropriate. While Schaub's power of total invulnerability is impressive and he is an enthusiastic and dedicated trainee, his lack of physical strength, skill, and wits make him an inappropriate candidate for the superhero program. As a result, Schaub eventually leaves the Initiative.

After Norman Osborn takes control of the Initiative, Schaub joins Osborn's Shadow Initiative, a black ops team within the Initiative. Schaub accompanies the team to liberate Negative Zone Prison Alpha. With the assistance of Hardball, a prison inmate, the facility is retaken. Schaub has subsequently been referred to as a hero by Norman Osborn and used as an everyman figure for Osborn's propaganda.

Schaub is among the young heroes to arrive at the new campus for Avengers Academy. He is part of the new class of students when the Academy moves to the former headquarters of the West Coast Avengers.

=== Butterball in other media ===
The Emery Schaub incarnation of Butterball appears in Lego Marvel's Avengers, voiced by Patrick Seitz.

== Buzz ==
The Buzz

Publication information
- Publisher: Marvel Comics
- First appearance: Spider-Girl Annual #1999 (Sept. 1999)
- Created by: Tom DeFalco; Ron Frenz

In-story information
- Alter ego: Jack Benjamin Jameson
- Team affiliations: New Warriors
- Partnerships: Spider-Girl
- Notable aliases: JJ
- Abilities: Powered armor grants: Superhuman strength Flight; 360 degree vision via goggles Gauntlets that fire electric blasts or streamers of sticky adhesive

The Buzz (Jack "JJ" Jameson) is a character who first appeared in the MC2 Spider-Girl comic book series. JJ is the grandson of J. Jonah Jameson and the son of John Jameson. First appearing in the aforementioned series, Buzz went on to have his own limited series.

Jack Jameson, or JJ to his friends, accompanied his grandfather, J. Jonah Jameson, C.E.O. of Jameson Communications (publisher of the Daily Bugle) to a demonstration of Project Human Fly. The project's goal was to create body armor that would grant the wearer superpowers. The staff of the project included Marla Jameson (Jonah's wife), biophysicist Dr. Sonja Jade and Robert Douglas, grandson of Robbie Robertson. It was then that JJ first met Buzz Bannon, a former Navy SEAL and the test pilot for the Human Fly armor. They quickly became friends. While JJ and Buzz were in the gym, Buzz received a message that he needed to attend a meeting about the Human Fly project, but it was a trap.

Sonja Jade turned out to be a traitor who took Marla, Jonah Jameson and Buzz Bannon hostage and was stealing the project files and armor. While her minions went to retrieve the armor, JJ and Richie Robertson discovered what was happening and triggered a fire alarm. Buzz used the distraction to overcome most of his guards, but he was shot in the abdomen during the fight, while Richie was beaten unconscious. Buzz and JJ manage to escape and get to the armor. A few moments later, the Human Fly rescues the hostages and went after the villains, but Dr. Jade got away due to an explosion. Later on that evening Buzz Bannon's body was discovered. JJ had donned the armor, but he could not tell his grandfather (who, in a fit of rage, accused the Human Fly of killing Bannon). JJ knew that the body armor was the only way he could avenge Buzz's death. He kept the armor a secret from his grandfather and, in memory of his friend, called himself the Buzz. Richie, having seen Buzz die, agreed to help JJ with his armor from an electronics equipped van. With Richie's help, the Buzz was able to find and defeat Dr. Jade. The Buzz soon met Spider-Girl, but she was leery of him since she read in the Daily Bugle that he was a murderer. Buzz managed to convince her that he was not, and later helped her form a new team of New Warriors.

== B'Wete ==
B'Wete is a clone of T'Challa introduced in Black Panther: Intergalactic, initially believing himself to be and going by the name of T'Challa, serving as the ruler of the Intergalactic Empire of Wakanda and aiming to hunt down his "imposter" with the help of his Ebony Guard. After being convinced of his clone status by the goddess Bast, "T'Challa" changes his name to B'Wete after his creator, taking the title of Herald of Wakanda.

== Byrrah ==
Byrrah is a member of the Atlantean royalty, and a citizen of Atlantis. Byrrah and Namor were close friends at childhood though they became rivals. Byrrah considered Namor a "half-breed" and unfit to rule Atlantis. Byrrah vied with Namor for the Atlantean throne when Emperor Thakorr was injured.

Byrrah was possible heir to the throne while Namor was gone. When Namor did return, Byrrah used a mind-control device to force the Atlanteans to choose him as ruler and exile Namor. Byrrah allied with Namor's enemies Attuma and Krang to defeat him, but failed and was exiled from Atlantis. With Krang and Lemuel Dorcas, he unsuccessfully attempted to turn Atlantean public sentiment against Namor.

=== Byrrah in other media ===
- Byrrah appears in The Marvel Super Heroes, voiced by Chris Wiggins.
- Byrrah appears as a mini-boss in Marvel: Ultimate Alliance, voiced by James Horan. This version is a member of Doctor Doom's Masters of Evil.
