= Thunderbolt (comics) =

Thunderbolt, in comics. may refer to:

- Thunderbolt (Marvel Comics), a Daredevil supporting character
- Thunderbolts (comics), a Marvel Comics team of reformed supervillains
  - Thunderbolts (comic book), several Marvel Comics comic book titles
- Thunderbolt Ross, an Incredible Hulk supporting character
- Thunderbolt (DC Comics), a genie associated with the DC Comics characters Johnny Thunder and Jakeem Thunder
- Peter Cannon, Thunderbolt, a Charlton Comics character
- Thunderbolt Jaxon, a Golden Age British superhero who was revived in a Wildstorm comic series by Dave Gibbons and John Higgins

== See also ==
- Thunderbolt (disambiguation)
