= Snake man =

Snake Man, Snake Men or snake people may refer to:

== Characters ==
- The Snake Men (Masters of The Universe), a line of Masters of the Universe toys
- Serpent Men, a fictional race created by Robert E. Howard and appearing in the Cthulhu Mythos
- The Snake People, a group of henchmen in The Archer: Fugitive from the Empire
- Snake Man (Mega Man), a character in the Mega Man franchise

== Films ==
- Snakeman (film), a 2005 Syfy TV film
- Isle of the Snake People, a 1971 horror film starring Boris Karloff

== People ==
- Adam Bobrow (born 1981), American ping pong commentator who goes by "Snakeman"

== Other uses ==
- "The Snake Man", an 18th-century short story by Pu Songling
- Snake Man of La Perouse, an animal show in Sydney, Australia
- Constantine John Philip Ionides (1901-1968), known as the Snake Man of British East Africa, British herpetologist
- Raymond Hoser or Snake-Man (born 1962), Australian herpetologist
- Snake Indians, a trio of indigenous northern plains tribes in the United States

== See also ==
- Snake woman (disambiguation)
- List of reptilian humanoids
- Nāga, shapeshifting snakes in Indian folklore
