= Iceman (Marvel Comics) =

Fictional character appearing in American comic books published by Marvel Comics

- Textless variant cover of Astonishing X-Men (vol. 2) #1 (October 2018). Art by Jeehyung Lee.

Publication information
- Publisher: Marvel Comics
- First appearance: The X-Men #1 (September 1963)
- Created by: Stan Lee (writer); Jack Kirby (artist/co-plotter)

In-story information
- Alter ego: Robert Louis "Bobby" Drake
- Species: Human mutant
- Place of origin: Floral Park, New York, United States
- Team affiliations: X-Men; X-Factor; Champions; Defenders; Marauders; Fantastic Four
- Notable aliases: Mister Friese; Frosty
- Abilities: Thermokinesis; Hydrokinesis; Cryokinesis; Ability to assume an enhanced physical form made of ice

Iceman (Robert Louis "Bobby" Drake) is a superhero appearing in American comic books published by Marvel Comics and is a founding member of the X-Men. Created by writer Stan Lee and artist/co-plotter Jack Kirby, the character first appeared in The X-Men #1 (Sept. 1963). Iceman is a mutant born with superhuman abilities. He has the ability to manipulate ice and cold by freezing water vapor around him. This allows him to freeze objects, as well as cover his body with ice.

Iceman has a relatively high profile among X-Men characters due to being frequently adapted into X-Men and Spider-Man-related media, including video games, animated series, and films. The character later received widespread media attention when a storyline retroactively revealed the original version of the character was a closeted gay man, in All-New X-Men #40 (April 2015), leading to his coming out.

Following the publication of this storyline, Iceman has been described as one of the most notable and powerful gay characters in comic books.

From 2000 to 2014, Shawn Ashmore portrayed Iceman in the 20th Century Fox X-Men films and voiced the character in The Super Hero Squad Show.

== Publication history ==
Created by writer Stan Lee and artist/co-writer Jack Kirby, the character first appeared in X-Men #1 (September 1963). Lee later admitted that Iceman was created essentially as a copy of the Human Torch, only using the opposite element for his power.

Iceman was featured in two self-titled limited comic book miniseries, one in 1984–85 written by J. M. DeMatteis and another in the 2000s by Andy Lanning and Dan Abnett, with art by Karl Kerschl. DeMatteis said of the first series, "It was my idea, so there was no one to blame but myself. I'll just say that it was a mistake and if the series made any sense whatsoever it was due to [editor] Bob Budiansky. That was a case where the editor's input was really needed—and Bob was a big help."

A mainstay in most X-Men titles, Iceman has been a main character in both Uncanny X-Men and the second volume of X-Men and was also featured in The Champions from 1975 to 1978 and The New Defenders from 1983 to 1986 as a member. He was a main character in the first volume of X-Factor, and a star in flashback stories when he was a teenager in X-Men: The Hidden Years and X-Men: First Class.

In April 2015, in issue 40 of All-New X-Men, a time-displaced version of the teenaged Iceman was revealed as gay by his teammate, Jean Grey, who discerned this with her telepathic ability. This raised questions, because the character's adult, present-day counterpart had previously been portrayed dating women. In Uncanny X-Men #600, which was published in November that year, the young Iceman confronts his older self, who confirms that he is gay as well but repressed his true self, not wanting to be both gay and a mutant. In 2017, Iceman received his first ongoing solo series, which focused on the adult Bobby Drake coming to terms with life as an out gay man, his status as an Omega-level mutant, his legacy as a hero and fighting some of the biggest villains in the Marvel Universe. The book had been cancelled, with its last issue being in early 2018. However, Marvel later reversed the decision and announced that a new book written by original writer Sina Grace as a part of their Fresh Start initiative and was released in 2019.

== Fictional character biography ==
=== Early life ===
Robert Louis "Bobby" Drake was born in Floral Park, Long Island, New York, to William and Madeline Drake, two Irish Catholics. His mother was also stated to be Jewish. Bobby's powers first manifested when he was on a date and he froze a local bully. The local townspeople formed an angry mob and the sheriff had no choice but to put Bobby in jail for his own "protection". Scott Summers offered to take Bobby with him. After Bobby turned him down, the two got into a short battle, which was ended by the arrival of Professor Charles Xavier.

=== Original X-Men ===
After Xavier spoke with Bobby and his parents, Bobby's parents suggested that he go with Professor Xavier to his "school for gifted youngsters", with him becoming the second member of the X-Men, followed by Henry "Hank" McCoy, Jean Grey, and Warren Worthington III as the founding members of the X-Men. Drake becomes self-conscious regarding the fact that he is the youngest member of the group. Appearing in his original snow covered form, he joins the team in their first battles against Magneto and the Brotherhood of Mutants. Not long after, he takes on a new ice-covered form. During his original stint with the X-Men, Drake pursues a relationship with Lorna Dane, although the relationship does not last.

Iceman is among the original X-Men captured by Krakoa, leading to a new incarnation of X-Men of which he is not a member. With most of the original team, he quits the X-Men.

=== Champions and Defenders ===
Iceman moves to the American west coast to attend UCLA and becomes a founding member of the Champions of Los Angeles. However, the Champions soon dissolve. Iceman retires to earn a college degree in accounting. While in college, he briefly rejoins the X-Men to rescue the captives of Arcade's henchman, Miss Locke.

Iceman is reunited with Beast and returns as a full-time superhero in the Defenders alongside Beast and Angel. After the Defenders disband, Iceman becomes an accountant.

=== X-Factor ===
The original X-Men, including Iceman, reunite to form the superhero team X-Factor. He encounters Apocalypse for the first time with this team.

Bobby is later captured by Loki, who enhances Bobby's powers to use him to manipulate the Frost Giants. He is rescued by Thor. Loki's tampering increases Bobby's powers to such an extent that he begins to lose control of his abilities. During a later battle with the Right, he is fitted with a power-dampening belt which helps him control his abilities. With time, Bobby gains sufficient control over his augmented powers and is able to stop using the inhibitor belt. Believing he has achieved his full potential, Bobby does not attempt to develop his abilities further.

Bobby develops a romantic relationship with Opal Tanaka. After the "Muir Island Saga", Iceman rejoins the X-Men along with the rest of X-Factor.

=== Second mutation and M-Day ===
Upon encountering Azazel and his followers, Iceman's body is shattered from the neck down. Afterward, he regains his entire ice form, but cannot change back to his human appearance. As a result, Bobby becomes both bitter and despondent because of this drastic change. He believes he loses his powers during the Decimation event, but it is revealed he suppressed his mutation subconsciously.

Iceman joins Rogue's team, and they fight the Children of the Vault. The team is successful and during this time, Bobby learns that he can be completely destroyed but then pull himself back together again.

After sharing a passionate kiss, it appears that Mystique and Iceman begin a romantic relationship, but Mystique is revealed to be a Marauder spy for Mister Sinister, who is trying to obtain Destiny's Diaries. Cannonball and Iceman escape, with Iceman later injured.

During the events of X-Men: Messiah Complex Iceman is recovering from his injuries. He rescues the New X-Men and later participates in the final battle against the Marauders, the Acolytes, and Predator X.

Iceman moves with the remaining mutants to Utopia in San Francisco. Iceman battles the Skrull invasion during Secret Invasion, and the Dark X-Men. During the battle with Bastion's Nimrod Sentinels, Iceman is severely injured following an attack from one of them that reversed his ice form and left him with burns on his body. He recovers soon after.

=== Schism ===
Iceman is the first person Wolverine recruits to his new X-Men squad as both a professor and teammate during X-Men: Schism. He also has an off-and-on romantic relationship with Kitty Pryde. Iceman joins Storm's new team to protect mutants from the Terrigen Mist in Extraordinary X-Men. During this time, he and Nightcrawler search for Colossus after he is transformed into one of Apocalypse's new Horsemen, and joins the X-Men against the Inhumans during the Inhumans vs. X-Men event.

Iceman is revealed to be a former member of the Fantastic Four after he is summoned to fight the Griever. The Human Torch objects to Iceman's presence during the battle, asserting that Iceman was never a member of the Fantastic Four. Iceman's brief membership is shown in a flashback, with Human Torch quitting the team an immature fit of pique, just as Iceman leaves the X-Men after they laughed at him for a poor Danger Room performance. Iceman assists the Fantastic Four for the day, but is attacked by a jealous Human Torch discovered this, but the pair were forced to work together to defeat their final opponent. Iceman was summoned back by Professor X, but Mr. Fantastic told Iceman that he could return whenever he wanted, with Torch rejoining. In the present, the pair reconcile after it's revealed Torch was apprehensive to Iceman joining the family rather than the team.

=== Solo series ===
After being outed as gay by the time-displaced Jean Grey, the younger time-displaced Iceman confronts his older self, asking him why he has never came out. The older Bobby breaks down and admits he forcibly repressed himself, fearful of how others would react, as well as the prejudice he already faces as a mutant.

Following this, Bobby decides to focus on himself, acting as a reserve X-Men member and teaching at the Xavier School. Bobby rushes to the hospital after his father has a heart attack, only to be chastised for missing family events due to superheroics. Kitty convinces him to come out to his parents. Bobby arranges dinner with his family but it is attacked by Purifiers. After defeating them, his parents make him leave. His parents later visit the X-Mansion, and he comes out to them. They react negatively, but the argument is interrupted by Juggernaut. Iceman defeats him and returns to find his father with Bobby's draft of a coming out letter, and the two begin to reconcile.

Bobby begins to date a human named Judah, and he moves to L.A. to be closer to him. Bobby and his time-displaced self go to dinner with their parents, who want to raise the younger Bobby as straight. During Bobby's moving away party at the X-Mansion, Daken attacks, injuring Judah. Bobby manages to defeat Daken, but he escapes, and Judah breaks up with Bobby due to his dangerous lifestyle.

Bobby is recruited by Emma Frost to rescue her brother Christian, fights Mister Sinister with Spider-Man and Firestar, and is confronted by his future self who warns him to stop using his abilities.

=== Krakoa and The Astonishing Iceman ===
Bobby joins the mutant nation of Krakoa after the Age of X-Man. He joined the Marauders and began a casual relationship with Christian Frost, which didn't work out. He later reconnected with Romeo, his time-displaced version's former Inhuman boyfriend that had been aged to adulthood during a dimensional adventure. During the Krakoan Age, Bobby's father died of his previous heart condition. He joined the X-Men after the second Hellfire Gala.

Bobby was one of the first casualties of the third annual Hellfire Gala, in which he did battle with Nimrod. He had gained the upper hand in the fight at first, only to be injected with cellular napalm that melted him. But sometime later, it was shown that Romeo had used his Inhuman powers and his emotional connection to Bobby to re-integrate him and restore him to life. However, his physical and mental cohesion is reliant on his proximity to Romeo.

Iceman battled Orchis and Mister Clean during his time with Romeo, and ultimately was able to keep himself alive without Romeo's powers.

=== From the Ashes ===
After Krakoa departed to the White Hot Room, Iceman remained behind on Earth. He became a guest instructor teaching finance at Avengers Academy, later assisting Kitty and Emma in Exceptional X-Men and in Graymatter Lane, the new school for mutants.

== Powers and abilities ==
Iceman possesses the power to instantly decrease the temperature of ambient water vapor in his immediate environment to below zero degrees Celsius, thereby freezing it into ice. This ability allows him to create structures out of ice, which he uses to create projectiles, shields, ladders, and slides that form rapidly beneath his feet, moving him along the slick surface at high speeds. As his powers progressed, Iceman gained further control of the structures he could create, being able to form exceedingly complicated structures within relative short time, such as miniature cities and even almost sentient ice golems. Iceman is also able to dissolve his own icy constructs.

Iceman's powers allow him to freeze objects and enemies, with his powers stated to be on the molecular level, allowing him to freeze all of molecules of an object with a thought; he once froze every single molecule of water within the body of David Haller. He can also manipulate the weather to some degree, creating effects such as blizzard, hail, and polar vortices.

In early appearances, Iceman covered his body in a thick layer of what appeared to be snow, with a significant decrease in body temperature. Upon further training in the use of his powers, he was able to fashion an armor of solid ice around his body when using his powers, which afforded him some degree of protection. Later on, he manifested the ability to convert the tissue of his body into organic ice. He sometimes augments his organic ice form with razor sharp adornments. On one occasion, Iceman suffered a severe chest injury while in his ice form and was able to heal himself by converting back into his normal human form.

Iceman has full cellular manipulation of his body, and is able to travel vast distances through bodies of water or ice, merging his cellular composition or consciousness into the formation and reforming in another area. He also able to reconstitute his organic ice form if any part of it is damaged, poisoned, or even completely shattered, without permanently harming himself. He can temporarily add the mass of a body of water to his own, increasing his mass, size, and strength. He can survive not only as ice, but as liquid water and water vapor. He can also transform his body from a gaseous state back to a solid, although it is physically and mentally taxing.

Iceman is immune to sub-zero temperatures and is able to perceive the thermal energy level of objects around him.

=== Omega-level potential ===
Writer Mike Carey, Iceman is "an Omega-level mutant ... [and] has powers that can influence the ecosystem of the entire world." Iceman has yet to tap into his full mutant potential, but over the years he has taken more interest in developing his abilities. Iceman's powers were pushed to their limit while possessed by Emma Frost, who used Iceman to discover the fate of her Hellions. Not even the combined might of the X-Men Gold team was able to stop Emma Frost in Iceman's body. Following this, Bobby confronted Emma about how she was able to use his powers so effectively. While together they made some initial progress, she refused to train him further. Instead he turned to Storm because they share similar elemental powers and she agreed to tutor him.

During the 2013–2014 "Battle of the Atom" storyline, Iceman's future self revealed that he has the ability to create semi-independent ice structures that can act on their own, although one of these structures—demonstrating a Hulk-like physique and intellect—has gone on to join the future version of the Brotherhood.

In the Krakoan Age, Iceman was formally identified as an Omega-level mutant. He used his powers in conjunction with other Omega-level mutants to terraform Mars.

=== Skills ===
In addition to his superhuman powers, Iceman has participated in hand-to-hand combat training at Xavier's School as well as coaching from the Black Widow and Hercules while serving with the Champions of Los Angeles. For comparison, the combat training he participated in is equivalent to that of fellow founding X-Men members Cyclops and Beast. He is also a certified accountant.

== Characterization ==
=== Personality ===
According to writer Mike Carey "one of Iceman's best personality traits is that emotionally Bobby Drake is like the ice he manipulates—not cold but transparent. 'He's devastatingly honest. He is very up-front with his emotions and his thoughts all the time.'" "Also, he's obviously incredibly brave both in terms of facing external, physical danger as well as facing up to unpleasant situations and admitting his own mistakes."

=== Friendships and relationships ===
Iceman first briefly dated the waitress Zelda Kurtzberg, but stopped seeing her. Iceman had a long-term relationship with a Japanese-American New Yorker named Opal Tanaka. He subsequently exhibited strong feelings for his fellow X-Man Polaris, but she did not return those feelings, due to her feelings towards Havok. Northstar developed an unrequited crush for Iceman during their time on the same team, though Iceman never did find out about this. Iceman later had a brief relationship with the Xavier School's nurse, Annie, but she eventually left him for Havok, who had just left Polaris at the altar. When Iceman attempted to rekindle his relationship with Polaris, that too ended abruptly, and Polaris returned to Havok. Iceman then had a relationship with the X-Men's enemy Mystique, who later betrayed him, despite her continued fixation on him, in as much as she stated that she would either kill him or cure him of his personal uncertainty. He had a relationship with Kitty Pryde.

Since coming out, Iceman has had brief relationships and encounters with a number of men, including the human Judah Miller, fellow mutant Simon Lasker, and Inhuman Romeo.

Iceman has long-lasting friendships with Spider-Man, Firestar and the Human Torch, as well the original team of X-Men, particularly Beast and Angel.

=== Sexuality ===
In All-New X-Men #40, the time-displaced Iceman is revealed to be gay, which eventually forces the youth to confront the adult version of himself about the matter. As both speak, the adult Iceman confirms the fact and that he had put all his energy into just being an X-Man as he could not cope with being a mutant and gay simultaneously. With the help of his younger self and Jean Grey, however, he finally comes to terms with his own sexuality, and comes out to fellow gay X-Man Anole in Extraordinary X-Men #6. The end of the Extermination X-Men event saw the redirecting of the time displaced version of Bobby back into the "closet" when he returned to his original timeline alongside the other X-Men, due to a mind lock by Jean Grey. In the present day, the current version retains both sets of memories and remains an out gay man.

== Cultural impact and legacy ==
=== Critical reception ===
Peter Eckhardt of CBR.com referred to Iceman as "the biggest name amongst queer X-Men," writing, "Iceman is an Omega-Level mutant and a longtime fan-favorite character. Iceman was only recently revealed as gay in a story handled somewhat clumsily in 2014's All-New X-Men #40 (written by Brian Michael Bendis and drawn by Mahmud Asrar). Nevertheless, writers as far back as the 1980s hinted that Bobby was gay, particularly in the 1990s when Iceman struggled with his sense of identity. Today, Iceman's story inspires and excites those looking for anything from understanding their own identity to epic, ice-based colossi." Mey Rude of Out stated, "While Northstar was the first out gay superhero in a Marvel comic, Iceman is his more famous gay X-Men teammate. Bobby Drake didn't come out until just recently in the comics, following some time travel shenanigans, but he's already become a gay favorite." Alyssa Gawaran of MovieWeb said, "Iceman, also a big part of the X-Men in the Marvel Comics, is one of the more groundbreaking LGBTQ+ characters in Marvel. Iceman broke boundaries in the franchise as he became the first-ever gay leading superhero to headline a comic, the "coming out moment" reported in a 2015 Vox article. Marvel has recently released Marauders Annual #1 that features a very heartwarming prom segment between Bobby Drake (Iceman) and his boyfriend, a new face to the comics, Christian Frost." Joshua Yehl of IGN described Iceman as "the perfect gay boyfriend," saying, "Bobby isn't out to be the biggest, baddest guy around. He's a more grounded and relatable guy, and while he often broadcasts his cocky attitude and wisecracking humor during battle, he's proven time and time again that his heart is in the right place when it comes to being there for his teammates. There's something incredibly charming about a guy who could become the Indomitable Iceman, laying waste to enemies with his icy wrath, yet he chooses to stay boy-next-door Bobby Drake, a funny, self-sacrificing guy who values being a friend and hero over becoming the most powerful guy in the room. Being gay has a lot in common with being a mutant, as excellently displayed during Iceman's “coming out” scene in X2: X-Men United. You're born that way, you will face bullying and discrimination for it, and those who claim to be your friends and family may turn their backs on you because of it. Bobby's experiences as both a mutant and an out gay man would make him an incredibly empathetic and understanding partner, one who would share his feelings and be there to help with yours. So even though he may not be the strongest mutant around, he'd be a hero to you in every way that counts."

=== Accolades ===
- In 2014, Entertainment Weekly ranked Iceman 27th in their "Let's rank every X-Man ever" list.
- In 2016, SBS included Iceman in their "10 queer superheroes who changed the face of comics" list.
- In 2018, The Daily Dot ranked Iceman 7th in their "Top 12 LGBTQ superheroes in DC and Marvel comics" list.
- In 2019, BBC included Iceman in their "Five LGBTQ+ superheroes you need to know about" list.
- In 2020, Gay Times included Iceman in their "13 queer superheroes we need to see in the Marvel Cinematic Universe" list.
- In 2022, The Mary Sue ranked Iceman 9th in their "10 Most Powerful X-Men of All Time" list.
- In 2022, MovieWeb ranked Iceman 4th in their "8 LGBTQ+ Marvel Comics Characters That Need to Be in the MCU" list.
- In 2022, Digital Trends ranked Iceman 10th in their "Marvel's most powerful mutants" list.

== Literary reception ==
=== Volumes ===
==== Iceman and Angel - 2011 ====
According to Diamond Comic Distributors, Iceman and Angel #1 was the 161st best selling comic book in March 2011.

Ryan K. Lindsay of CBR.com called Iceman and Angel #1 "as much fun as you want, but as pithy as you expect too," asserting, "A one-shot should be a comic that stands on its own, and this issue certainly does that. It needs to give you enough narrative meat to feel like the money was well invested, and this issue mostly does that. It should elicit some form of strong reaction from you in the few pages it has, and this issue works hard to make you laugh and is more successful than not. See Namor score some bagels and Googam become a broheim. It's not earth shattering but it is solid fun and sometimes that's just what you need. Pick up this comic and feel the freedom of old funny done-in-one comics just like they did when you were a kid where the parts add up to greater than the actual whole." David Brothers of ComicsAlliance ranked Iceman and Angel #1 10th in their "10 Top Marvel Comics Coming in March 2011," saying, "One of the best things we don't see much of any more is the relationship between the original X-Men. The modern series is all about hard decisions, hard edges, and hard core self protection, but back in the day, they were just a bunch of kids who hung out together. Iceman and Angel in particular were pretty fun together, because one was a goofball and the other was a self-styled ladies man. Brian Clevinger has proven that he can do stories like this, where he takes a slice of time and expands on it in a meaningful way, and Juan Doe is a pretty great artist. Add in GOOM, a classic Marvel villain, and you've got a story that I think is going to be a pretty good read. X-Men First Class may be dead in name, but these one-shots are doing a pretty good job of keeping the feeling alive."

==== Iceman - 2017 ====
According to Diamond Comic Distributors, Iceman #1 was the 62nd best selling comic book in June 2017. Iceman #1 was the 655-656th best selling comic book in 2017.

Matthew Aguilar of ComicBook.com gave Iceman #1 a grade of 4 out of 5 stars, writing, "On the art side of things, the book is a mixed bag. Alessandro Vitti's pencils and Rachelle Rosenberg's colors shine when ice is involved in some form or fashion, as referenced early and later in the book. In the middle, though things get a bit muddy, and the facial expressions suffer. Not enough to detract in a huge way, but the book definitely improves when Drake is in his ice form. Overall writer Sina Grace is off to an excellent start here, providing a refreshing look into a fan favorite character that has always been more than his powers but needed someone to bring that out of him. It looks like this time is up for the task." Jesse Schedeen of IGN gave Iceman #1 a grade of 7.8 out of 10, stating, "Iceman #1 doesn't make the strongest case for this series as an ongoing story, as it could just as easily be a standalone one-shot starring the frozen X-Man. But it's a very well-executed story regardless, one that showcases Bobby Drake's crazy personal life while still making the most of his incredible powers. Iceman is shaping up to be a worthy addition to the ResurrXion lineup."

==== Iceman - 2018 ====
According to Diamond Comic Distributors, Iceman #1 was the 43rd best selling comic book in September 2018. Iceman #1 was the 508th best selling comic book in 2018.

Jamie Lovett of Comicook.com called Iceman #1 a "well-crafted book," saying,"Iceman #1 is a stellar return. Most impressive is how the issue is completely capable of standing alone, but also seeds an exciting story to come. Even a casual X-Men fan will recognize the deadliness of the threat behind this issue's attempts to recreate the "Mutant Massacre." Longtime X-Men fans, and fans of Iceman, in particular, will get something extra out of the last page reveal of who's waiting for Bobby at home. Iceman #1 is a triumphant return for an underappreciated series. The longer Sina Grace writes Bobby Drake, the more Iceman develops into a truly compelling, relatable leading man. Grace found the perfect artistic partners in Nathan Stockman and Frederico Blee. Here's hoping Iceman gets more of the attention it deserves the second time around." Maite Molina of ComicsVerse gave Iceman #1 a score of 80%, asserting, "Iceman #1 is a resolute start to a new run. Thanks to some palpable character development and an intriguing plot, the issue succeeds in gripping a reader's attention. The stage has been set for some intriguing new story arcs, ones that will feature some familiar, sinister villains. Hopefully, Bobby Drake is ready for these impending challenges, ones that he may not even see coming."

== Other versions ==
=== Time-displaced Iceman ===
==== All-New X-Men ====
The young time-displaced Iceman by Stuart Immonen

Following the war with the Phoenix Five, as Cyclops begins to lash out against government oppression of mutants, a chance comment by Bobby about how the old Cyclops would not tolerate what he is currently doing inspires Beast to travel back in time and recruit the original five X-Men to stop Cyclops. The team decides to stay in the present instead of returning into the past. The younger Bobby is especially shocked by the older Bobby's Omega level powers.

The younger, time-displaced Bobby is forced to confront being gay by his teammate, Jean, who found out using her psychic abilities. The young Bobby confronts his older self, who admits to being gay, having 'concealed' that part of himself so that he could have avoid being prejudiced against for another part of himself.

He begins a relationship with Inhuman Romeo. The group of X-Men operate as a unit in X-Men Blue. The group return to the past at the behest of a young Cable to prevent their deaths at the hands of Ahab, but all their memories of their time in the future are erased.

=== "Age of Apocalypse" ===
An alternate universe version of Iceman appears in "Age of Apocalypse". This version is a member of the X-Men who was trained by Magneto. Iceman is capable of breaking down his body and merging it with another body of water to travel great distances in a matter of seconds.

Iceman returns in the Uncanny X-Force arc "The Dark Angel Saga", when the title team is forced to travel to the AoA reality. He abandons the X-Men, believing they cannot win, and is soon brought to Earth-616 by Dark Beast, where he joins forces with Archangel on his quest to eradicate all life on Earth and create a new evolution process. Iceman escapes to Madripoor after their defeat by X-Force, but is hunted by the "Age of Apocalypse" version of Nightcrawler. Nightcrawler shoves Iceman into an incinerator, killing him.

=== Ultimate Marvel ===
An alternate version of Iceman appears in "Ultimate X-Men". Bobby Drake ran away from his family at the peak of government-supported Sentinel attacks, fearing for his family's safety. He joins the X-Men as their youngest founding member. He briefly dates Rogue, but the two like other people, and Bobby starts to date Shadowcat. Later, he is kicked out of his home for being a mutant, and moves in with Aunt May.

=== Others ===
- "Battle of the Atom": Iceman develops the ability to create semi-independent ice structures that can act on their own. One of these structures, a structure called Ice Thing possessing a Hulk-like physique and intellect, goes on to join the future version of the Brotherhood.
- "House of M": Iceman is a member of the Horsemen of Apocalypse who joined the group after Apocalypse rescued him from a mutant internment camp that his parents had sent him to.
- Alternate versions of Iceman appear often, including in Midnight X-Men, Marvel Zombies, Days of Future Past, Shadow X, and X-Babies.

== In other media ==
=== Television ===
Iceman as he appeared in Spider-Man and His Amazing Friends.

- Iceman appears in the "Sub-Mariner" segment of The Marvel Super Heroes, voiced by Tom Harvey. This version is a member of the Allies for Peace.
- Iceman appears in Spider-Man and His Amazing Friends, voiced by Frank Welker. This version is a government agent codenamed "Windchill Factor Zero", founding member of the Spider-Friends, and former member of the X-Men.
- Iceman appears in X-Men: The Animated Series, voiced by Jesse Collins. This version is a former member of the X-Men who quit due to disagreements with Charles Xavier and was previously in a relationship with Polaris.
- Iceman appears in X-Men: Evolution, voiced by Andrew Francis. This version is the unofficial leader of the X-Men's junior team, the New Mutants.
- Iceman appears in Wolverine and the X-Men, voiced by Yuri Lowenthal. This version is a member of the X-Men.
- Iceman appears in The Super Hero Squad Show episode "Mysterious Mayhem at Mutant High!", voiced by Shawn Ashmore. This version is the Xavier Academy's class clown.
- Iceman appears in Marvel Disk Wars: The Avengers, voiced by Yuki Tai in the Japanese version and again by Yuri Lowenthal in the English version. This version is a member of the X-Men.
- Iceman appears in Lego Marvel Avengers: Mission Demolition, voiced by Scott Porter.

=== Film ===
Bobby Drake/Iceman as portrayed by Shawn Ashmore in X-Men: The Last Stand

Iceman appears in 20th Century Fox's X-Men film series, portrayed by Shawn Ashmore. This version is a student at the Xavier Institute.

- First appearing in X-Men, he is one of the first students to befriend Rogue, with whom he enters a relationship.
- In X2, he displays an uneasy friendship with classmate Pyro, who goes on to join Magneto's Brotherhood, and a strained relationship with his family, with his brother turning him in to the police for being a mutant.
- In X-Men: The Last Stand, Iceman's relationship with Rogue deteriorates due in part to involvement from their classmate Kitty Pryde. He later battles and defeats Pyro in combat while helping the X-Men protect a facility in Alcatraz that had created a "mutant cure".
- In a dystopian future depicted in X-Men: Days of Future Past, Iceman's powers have grown stronger, though he is killed by a Sentinel. In the "Rogue Cut", he is killed while helping Rogue and Magneto escape. In both versions of the film, Iceman is resurrected after Pryde and Wolverine alter the timeline.
- Bobby Drake / Iceman will appear in the Marvel Cinematic Universe, starting with the untitled X-Men film, with Ben Wang in talks to portray him.

=== Video games ===
- Iceman appears as a bonus level boss in Fantastic Four.
- Iceman appears as a playable character in X-Men: Children of the Atom, voiced by Cal Dodd.
- Iceman appears in Marvel vs. Capcom: Clash of Super Heroes.
- Iceman appears in Marvel vs. Capcom 2: New Age of Heroes.
- Iceman appears as a playable character in X-Men Legends, voiced by Darren Scott.
- Iceman appears as a playable character in X-Men Legends II: Rise of Apocalypse, voiced by James Arnold Taylor.
- Iceman appears as a playable character in Marvel: Ultimate Alliance, voiced again by James Arnold Taylor. Additionally, his Age of Apocalypse, classic suit, original comics suit, and New X-Men design appear as alternate skins.
- Iceman appears as a playable character in X-Men: The Official Game, voiced again by Shawn Ashmore.
- Iceman appears as a playable character in Marvel: Ultimate Alliance 2, voiced by Adam Bobrow.
- Iceman appears in Magneto's ending in Marvel vs. Capcom 3: Fate of Two Worlds.
- Iceman appears as a playable character in Marvel Super Hero Squad Online, voiced by Antony Del Rio.
- Iceman appears in X-Men: Destiny, voiced by Jason Marsden.
- Iceman appears as a playable character in Marvel Avengers: Battle for Earth.
- Iceman appears as a playable character in Marvel Avengers Alliance.
- Iceman appears as a playable character in Lego Marvel Super Heroes.
- Iceman appears as a playable character in Marvel Contest of Champions.
- Two incarnations of Iceman appear as playable characters in Marvel Puzzle Quest.
- Iceman appears as a playable character in Marvel Heroes, voiced by James Arnold Taylor.
- Iceman appears as a playable character in Marvel Powers United VR, voiced by James Arnold Taylor.
- Iceman appears as a downloadable playable character in Marvel Ultimate Alliance 3: The Black Order, voiced again by James Arnold Taylor.
- Iceman appears as a playable character in Marvel Super War.
- Iceman appears as a playable character in Marvel: Future Fight.
- Iceman appears in Marvel Tōkon: Fighting Souls.

=== Miscellaneous ===
- Iceman appears in the 1987 live adaptation of Spider-Man's wedding to Mary Jane.
- Iceman appears in the novelization for X-Men: The Last Stand, in which he saves Pyro from Phoenix's destruction.

== Collected editions ==
Title	Material collected	Published date	ISBN
X-Men: Iceman	Iceman (vol.1) #1–4, Bizarre Adventures #27	August 15, 2012	978-0785162759
X-Men Icons - Iceman	Iceman (vol. 2) #1–4	December 1, 2001	978-0785108894
X-Men: First Class - Class Portraits	Ice Man and Angel #1 and Cyclops #1, Magneto #1, Marvel Girl #1; and material from Spider-Man Family #8-9, Marvel Comics Presents (vol. 2) #3	April 20, 2011	978-0785155591
X-Men Origins: The Complete Collection	X-Men Origins: Iceman and X-Men Origins: Colossus, Jean Grey, Beast, Wolverine, Sabretooth, Gambit, Cyclops, Nightcrawler, Emma Frost, Deadpool	August 7, 2018	978-1302912208
Iceman Vol. 1: Thawing Out	Iceman (vol. 3) #1–5	January 9, 2018	978-1302908799
Iceman Vol. 2: Absolute Zero	Iceman (vol. 3) #6-11	May 8, 2018	978-1302908805
Iceman Vol. 3: Amazing Friends	Iceman (vol. 4) #1–5	April 9, 2019	978-1302914837
Astonishing Iceman: Out Cold	Astonishing Iceman #1–5	May 14, 2024	978-1302952495
