= Warren Worthington III =

Marvel Comics fictional character

Warren Kenneth Worthington III
- Cover of Uncanny X-Men (vol. 4) #7 (July 2016) showing Warren's feathered wings as Angel (left) and metallic wings as Archangel (right). Art by Greg Land.

Publication information
- Publisher: Marvel Comics
- First appearance: The X-Men #1 (September 1963)
- Created by: Stan Lee (writer); Jack Kirby (artist/co-plotter)

In-story information
- Full name: Warren Kenneth Worthington III
- Species: Human mutant
- Place of origin: Centerport, New York, United States
- Team affiliations: X-Men; X-Force; X-Club; Mutantes Sans Frontières; X-Factor; Renegades; The Champions of Los Angeles; The Defenders/The Secret Defenders; Hellfire Club; Horsemen of Apocalypse; X-Terminators; Worthington Industries; Cheyarafim; Jean Grey School Students
- Notable aliases: Angel; Avenging Angel; Archangel; Dark Angel; Death; Master of the Seven Seeds
- Abilities: As Angel: Enhanced strength, stamina, durability, and senses; Flight via feathered wings and hollow bones; Regenerative healing factor; Aerial adaptation; As Archangel: Superhuman strength, stamina, and durability, and senses; Razor sharp/poisonous feather projection; Regenerative healing factor; Flight via metal wings; Aerial adaptation

Warren Kenneth Worthington III is a superhero appearing in American comic books published by Marvel Comics. Created by writer Stan Lee and artist Jack Kirby, the character first appeared in The X-Men #1 (September 1963). Warren is a founding member of the X-Men, having used the moniker Angel. Later stories would reveal that prior to joining the team, he had acted as a vigilante under the moniker Avenging Angel.

Warren is a mutant, an evolved species of humans who are born with superhuman abilities. The character originally possesses a pair of large feathered wings extending from his back, enabling him to fly. He is the heir of the Worthington family fortune, and this privileged background results in Warren being stereotyped as self-absorbed and unable to deal with hardships during his early years with the X-Men. This personality was ultimately replaced with a more introspective and brooding personality in the late 1980s, when the character was changed into the darker Archangel persona. While Warren's wings were originally feathered, his transition to Archangel resulted in metallic wings and newfound powers.

As one of the original X-Men, Warren has had a frequent presence in X-Men-related comic books throughout the years and also appeared occasionally in X-Men animated series and video games. In 20th Century Fox's X-Men film series, the character was portrayed by Ben Foster in X-Men: The Last Stand (2006) and Ben Hardy in X-Men: Apocalypse (2016). Asa Germann will portray the character in the Marvel Cinematic Universe, starting with the untitled X-Men film (2028).

== Publication history ==
The character was created by writer Stan Lee and artist/co-creator Jack Kirby and first appeared in X-Men #1 (Sept. 1963) as Angel. Lee made Angel rich and conceited, as well as a winged human to make him the first Marvel character with wings. He appeared as a regular character in that title until it was cancelled with issue #66. The title was revived shortly after, reprinting earlier issues from issue #67 to #93. In 1970 and 1971, a three-part Angel solo feature was published as a back-up strip in Ka-Zar #2 and #3 and Marvel Tales #30.

Angel appeared in the X-Men revamp by Len Wein and Dave Cockrum in 1975 with the introduction of the "All-New, All-Different X-Men" (Giant-Size X-Men #1 May 1975), but left the X-Men title with issue #94. Angel and fellow X-Man Iceman were transitioned into a new series called The Champions, which ran from 1975 to 1978. Series creator Jenny Blake Isabella had wanted to do a series about Angel and Iceman traveling together on the highway, in the vein of Route 66, but the editors told her to make it into a full team book.

Angel returned to the X-Men briefly in The Uncanny X-Men #134, officially returning to the roster in issue #138 before once again leaving in issue #148. Afterwards, the character, along with fellow founding X-Men Beast and Iceman, joined the roster of The Defenders, as part of a short-lived "revamp" of the title, in which the series was renamed The New Defenders. Angel would stay with the title, as the group's leader, for the book's last three years of publication (1983–1986). The series was canceled in 1986 to free up Angel and his fellow X-Men to star in X-Factor, which debuted in February. Angel remained in the book until issue #70, which was the last issue before the book was revamped with an all-new roster. During X-Factor #16–24, the character is presumed dead after losing his wings and apparently killing himself in a plane crash. Angel was dramatically revamped as a character, given a new costume, blue skin, and metallic wings which could fire blades. He first appeared as Archangel in X-Factor #24 (Jan. 1988). According to X-Factor writer Louise Simonson and penciler Walt Simonson, the Archangel revamp was motivated in part by their feeling that Angel was a Mary Sue (being wealthy, handsome, and adored by women), and in part by the fact that, due to the inflation of superhero abilities, Angel was underpowered compared to other characters in the Marvel Universe.

Angel was added to the cast of Uncanny X-Men title and appeared in that series and its companion series X-Men for most of the 1990s. In 1996, Marvel also published a one-shot story simply called Archangel, which was written by Peter Milligan. He also appeared alongside Psylocke in a limited series called Psylocke & Archangel: Crimson Dawn (August 1997 – November 1997, 4 issues). From 1999 to 2001, Angel also featured in the series X-Men: The Hidden Years, which was set in the original X-Men's early days.

Under Joe Casey (2001–2002) and Chuck Austen (2002–2004), Angel became leader of the X-Men team that appeared in the pages of Uncanny X-Men. After Chris Claremont replaced Austen on that title, the character went away for several months before reappearing in the pages of another Claremont-written series, Excalibur (vol. 3 2004). He continued to guest-star in the Incredible Hulk title during the events of World War Hulk (2007) and then returned to Uncanny X-Men (2008-2011) while simultaneously appearing in X-Force (vol. 3) (2008-2010), where the character regained his metallic wings and again assumed the codename Archangel, and subsequently in Uncanny X-Force (2010-2011), in which his mind and personality were wiped.

After his personality was stripped, he appeared in a supporting role as one of the students at the Jean Grey School in Wolverine and the X-Men (2011–2013). He later joined Magneto's more militant X-Men team in Uncanny X-Men (2016-2017) and an international strike force in Astonishing X-Men (2017-2018) after his memory was restored. At the same time, a time-displaced version of Angel's younger self was brought to the present and starred in All-New X-Men (2012–2017) and X-Men Blue (2017-2018), before being returned to his correct time-period in the mini-series Extermination (2018).

Angel appeared in House of X and Powers of X (2019), which detailed the birth of the Krakoan Age. He was made the CXO of Krakoa's new X-Corp and appeared in the mini-series Empyre: X-Men (2020), X-Corp (2021) and Dark X-Men (2023). As the Krakoa era came to a close, he was the focus of the 50th anniversary issue of Giant-Size X-Men (2024) and appeared in the mini-series X-Men: Heir of Apocalypse (2024).

== Fictional character biography ==
=== Angel ===
Warren Worthington III was born in Centerport, New York, to Kathryn Worthington and Warren Worthington II and the grandson of Warren Worthington. He attends Phillips Exeter Academy in his adolescence when his feathered wings begin to grow from his shoulder blades. At first, Warren feels he is a freak and aberration, but he soon learns that he can use his wings to fly and help people. When there is a fire in his dormitory, he borrows some props from the school's drama department, dresses up as a heavenly angel, and rescues his friends. He soon learns that he is in fact a mutant. He dons a mask and costume, calls himself the Avenging Angel, and becomes a solo adventurer, before being recruited by Professor Charles Xavier for the X-Men.

Warren's status as a wealthy playboy, as well as being an outspoken individual who chafes at the notion of being told what to do, is the subject of much tension within the X-Men. In particular, Warren is in love with Jean Grey, who is in love with Scott Summers, although he ultimately sets aside his love for Jean, coming to terms with the fact that Jean loves Scott. Angel still harbors an unrequited love for Jean even as he begins dating Candy Southern.

Around this time, Angel publicly reveals himself as a mutant after discovering that his uncle Burt Worthington has not only murdered his father, but also poisoned his mother to ensure his inheritance of the Worthington fortune.

When the original X-Men are captured by the mutant island Krakoa, Professor X creates a new team of X-Men to rescue them. When this new team decides to stay on as X-Men, Angel and the rest of the original team, with the exception of Cyclops, leave. He and Iceman go to Los Angeles, where they found the Champions with Hercules, Black Widow, and Ghost Rider. Following the apparent death of Jean Grey and Cyclops' subsequent exile from the team, Warren rejoins the X-Men. However, he grows increasingly disturbed by the behavior and actions of Wolverine, and quits the team in protest. Shortly thereafter, Angel joins the Defenders, along with Beast, Iceman, and Candy Southern. Most of the group are killed freeing teammate Moondragon from demonic possession.

Angel considers retirement following the collapse of the Defenders, but the discovery of Jean Grey alive changes his mind. Jean Grey is furious at the increase in anti-mutant hysteria in the two years she has been missing, and opposes the X-Men's decision to align themselves with Magneto. To appease Jean's desire for action, Warren organizes X-Factor. Warren recruits his old friend Cameron Hodge to run the team, unaware that Hodge is opposed to mutants.

=== Archangel ===
X-Factor's formation begins a period of upheaval in Warren's life. Cameron Hodge abuses Warren's trust and portrays X-Factor as "mutant hunters" for hire, further fueling anti-mutant sentiment. An altercation with the Brotherhood of Mutants allows Mystique to discover the relationship between the "mutant hunters" and the former X-Men; she exposes Warren as the financial backer for X-Factor, causing a public relations nightmare. Warren's wings are mutilated by Harpoon during the "Mutant Massacre", resulting in Hodge having the wings amputated against Warren's will. Despondent over the loss, Warren escapes the hospital in his private jet, which is sabotaged by Hodge and explodes.

Seconds before the explosion, Warren is spirited away by Apocalypse and made into Death, one of his four Horsemen. Apocalypse subjects Angel to extensive genetic alterations, giving him blue skin and organic metal wings. He makes Warren the leader of his Horsemen after Warren beats the others in a fight, and gives him a drug that remove his reservations to follow Apocalypse's dark plans. During a later attack on Manhattan, Iceman fakes his own death at Warren's hands, hoping that the shock of killing a friend will enable him to break free of the influence of Apocalypse's drug. Although freed, Warren refuses to rejoin X-Factor, feeling that he has changed too much psychologically to be a hero.

He seeks out Candy Southern, but finds that she is missing. Warren learns that Candy has been lobotomized to protect Cameron Hodge's secrets using funds embezzled from Warren. In the confrontation that follows, Hodge murders Candy in front of Warren, who kills Hodge. Changing his codename from "Death" to "Dark Angel", he later rejoins X-Factor and takes the codename Archangel during the events of "Inferno".

=== Angel again ===
In an attempt to put his dark days behind him, Warren retires his "Death" uniform in favor of the blue/white costume Magneto made for him. After Psylocke is eviscerated by X-Men prisoner Sabretooth during an escape attempt, Warren and the X-Men track him down and capture him, but not before he badly damages Warren's metal wings. Eventually, the metal wings shatter completely, revealing that Warren's feathered wings have been growing back within them and have broken them apart from the inside.

Angel is one of several X-Men who are present when Gambit's culpability in the events of the "Mutant Massacre" is made public by Magneto, which turns him against his teammate. Shortly afterwards, with the X-Men broke and their mansion stripped bare by the United States government, Angel volunteers money to help keep the team going, though this requires his reclaiming full control over his family company to do so. Tracking some of his company's finances at this time, Warren discovers the former villains the Thunderbolts retrieving a jet that was used by the Champions, but although initially suspicious of the Thunderbolts' motives, after joining them in a confrontation with Graviton, Warren accepts their genuine desire to reform, leaving them with the jet as he wishes them luck. Angel returns to the X-Men following the events of Apocalypse: The Twelve.

When Rogue leaves the X-Men to join Storm's splinter group (X-Treme X-Men), Angel is promoted to head of the X-Men's field team. During a battle with Black Tom Cassidy, Angel reverts to his human skin color when Cassidy attempts to drain Angel's life force from him. His healing powers from The Twelve also manifest themselves again, in the form of the revelation that Angel's blood has healing properties.

=== Decimation ===
Following the death of Jean Grey, Warren takes an extended leave of absence from the team. He begins doing overseas charity work at this point, in the form of a charity called "Mutants Sans Frontières" in Zanzibar (a reference to Doctors Without Borders). There, he helps thwarts a coup attempt.

=== Messiah Complex ===
Angel is part of the team that investigates the new mutant birth in Alaska. He is later part of the team who is looking for former Acolytes. He is next seen part of the same team, but attacking the Marauders. Warren goes against Mister Sinister, but is easily defeated once Sinister recovers from Emma Frost's mental attack. Angel is knocked out, but recovers and is present with the X-teams for the final battle over the fate of the baby.

=== Divided We Stand ===
Angel is later seen flying over San Francisco, going to meet with Hepzibah, Warpath, and Iceman, when he stumbles across an area that looks as if the 1960s never ended. He contacts Cyclops and Emma Frost, asking them for assistance before suffering the mind-altering effects of the zone, which are revealed to be caused by Martinique Jason. Angel and the three other ensnared X-Men are sent by Martinique to confront Cyclops and Frost. Frost manages to free them from the illusion and, during the fall-out battle, Angel rescues Mayor Sadie Sinclair. Thankful for the assistance and for the idea of having real superheroes in their city, Sinclair talks to Cyclops and Angel about helping them resettle the X-Men in San Francisco.

=== Archangel returns ===
In X-Force vol. 3 #4, Warren is brutally attacked by a mind-controlled Wolfsbane. During the attack, Wolfsbane rips Warren's wings off and runs away, taking the wings with her. Elixir reveals that Warren's wings, despite appearing fully organic, are actually still techno-organic constructs that he is unable to regenerate. Wolfsbane later delivers the wings to the Purifiers, who are seeking the Apocalypse Strain, the techno-organics which comprise Warren's wings. The Purifiers use the Apocalypse Strain to modify an army of Purifier agents, giving them the same metallic wings that Archangel once had. Although Elixir is able to heal all of Warren's injuries, he cannot regrow his wings due to interference from the Apocalypse Strain. Later in the story, Warren is gripped by a series of excruciating seizures that not only mysteriously regenerate his techno-organic wings, but also transform him back into Apocalypse's version of Death/Archangel, complete with blue skin and a techno-organic version of his uniform.

X-Force attacks Archangel, who eventually asks for relief from the pain of losing his wings and transforming into Archangel. Archangel escapes, to take revenge on the Purifiers, and at their headquarters he slaughters most of them in a blood-maddened rage. Once the battle is over, he reverts to his normal Caucasian, feather-winged appearance. He comments to Wolverine that he can still feel the metal wings inside him, and that they want to come out again. According to Elixir, Warren's transformation is permanent, implying that he is fully capable of transforming back into Archangel again at any time.

In an attempt to understand what was done to both Wolfsbane and Angel, the pair of them are placed in a room together, where Rahne is forced to gaze at Warren. The mere sight of him causes her to become murderous once again, and she attempts to rip the wings from Warren's body once more. The sight of a psychotic Wolfsbane, as well as the fear of having his wings torn from his body again, causes a defensive reaction in Warren, reverting him back into his violent Archangel persona. From then on, Angel takes dual membership with both the X-Men and X-Force, though Cyclops forbids Angel from telling the rest of the team about the return of his Archangel powers.

=== Dark Angel Saga ===
In the "Dark Angel Saga", Warren's "Archangel" persona, which was secretly created when Apocalypse first transformed Angel into a Horseman of Death, has finally taken over Warren's mind, and Warren now plans on becoming the heir to Apocalypse. At the conclusion of the story arc, Betsy Braddock stabs Archangel in the chest with the Celestial Life Seed, seemingly killing him. In the aftermath of the explosion of Apocalypse's citadel, Warren is seen by the members of X-Force walking in the snow. Psylocke, shocked that he is alive and apparently free of Apocalypse, runs up and embraces him. This Warren, however, appears to suffer from amnesia, having no idea who Psylocke is. Warren has his normal skin again yet seems to have retained his metallic wings. Following the Dark Angel Saga, it is revealed that Warren had indeed died and his soul departed for the afterlife, with his Celestial-mutated body now hosting a new personality with its own soul.

=== Warren's children/Apocalypse Twins ===
In an apocalyptic possible future, an aging Frank Castle warns the present-day Deadpool about the "son of Archangel". During Uncanny Avengers (2013), it is revealed that while preparing to ascend as Apocalypse during the "Dark Angel Saga", Warren fathered two children with Pestilence of the Final Horsemen, who appear as Uriel and Elimin, the time-traveling Kang the Conqueror-disciples "Apocalypse Twins".

=== All-New, All-Different Marvel ===
As part of the All-New, All-Different Marvel event, Angel has mysteriously reverted to his pre-Life Seed, blue-skinned Archangel form, and he appears as a member of Magneto's new Uncanny X-Men to protect mutantkind at all costs.

=== Apocalypse Wars ===
Psylocke and Magneto travel to Green Ridge, Colorado, to investigate reports of an up-and-coming preacher who looks identical to the original Angel. They discover that he is indeed the Angel who was created by the Celestial Life Seed, and he is attracting a cult of religious fanatics around him. It is revealed that, during the 8-month timeskip after the events of Secret Wars, Angel allied himself with Apocalypse's son, Genocide, and Clan Akkaba in exchange for their help in controlling his Horseman of Death personality. Clan Akkaba is constantly harvesting Angel's rapidly regenerating metal wings (to prevent the Death persona from fully possessing Angel) and grafting them onto his clones, creating a mindless clone army of blue-skinned Archangels. The silent Archangel, a member of Magneto's team of X-Men, was merely the first such clone, and he retained trace memories from the original Angel, which allowed him to escape and join Magneto's X-Men. Magneto and Psylocke are captured, but Psylocke easily escapes. She engages in combat with Fantomex, who was sent by Magneto as back-up along with Mystique. A chastised and repentant Angel explains to Magneto and Psylocke that he and the silent Archangel are ultimately two half-parts of the same singular being. The two counterparts then physically combine into a new blue-skinned persona.

== Powers and abilities ==
=== As Angel ===
Warren's primary power is that of natural flight, due to his large feathered wings. His wings have superhuman strength, and they have a very flexible skeletal structure that enables him to press them to the back of his torso and legs with only a slight bulge visible under his clothing. His bones are hollow, his body processes food much more efficiently than a normal human body and does not store any excess fat, and he possesses a greater proportionate muscle mass than normal. As a result, his strength, speed, agility, flexibility, endurance, reflexes, coordination, balance, eyesight, and hearing are at their peak. Elements of his anatomy are comparable to those of birds, especially birds of prey. His eyes can withstand high-speed winds that would damage the average human eye. He can breathe at high velocities or altitudes, and he can cope with the reduced temperatures at high altitudes for prolonged periods of time, giving him a greater-than-normal capacity to endure low temperatures in areas such as the Arctic. The strength in his natural wings can easily break a man's arm or leg, or even put someone through a wall.

He has undergone heavy training with Professor X, especially in mastering his flight indoors. He has demonstrated superior agility, flexibility, reflexes, coordination, and balance while flying and has been shown defeating superbeings much faster than him by dodging them and having them smash against the ground or a wall at full speed.

Angel is also an accomplished hand-to-hand combatant, having defeated several of the werewolf-like homo superior when Wolverine is defeated. He is trained in hand-to-hand combat at Xavier's school; while dating Psylocke, he receives a considerable amount of martial arts instruction. During his years on the team, he is given extensive training from Wolverine, and when he once surprises Wolverine after taking down some men, he says, "My father spoiled me with more than money." He received further instruction from Black Widow and Hercules during his days with the Champions.

As the result of a secondary mutation which has been shown inconsistently, Angel also develops a healing factor and can heal others by mixing his blood with theirs, provided they have a matching blood type to Warren's. In an issue of X-Force it is apparent that this healing factor comes from his wings as seen when Warren is savagely attacked and his wings are ripped from his body, his healing factor fails to work, and he instead must be healed by Elixir.

The original Warren was a skilled businessman, and the new Warren has retained his position as the primary stockholder and chairman emeritus (former chairman) of the board-of-directors of Worthington Industries.

=== As Archangel ===
Archangel possesses metallic techno-organic wings grafted onto him by the genetic engineering of Apocalypse when Apocalypse renames him the Horseman of Death. These wings are composed of a durable, organic material that resembles the "organic steel" of Colossus' body. The wings give him the ability to project his metallic feathers out from his wings at great speed and with tremendous force, enabling them to pierce even steel, tipped with poison.

Archangel does not have complete control over his feathers, which sometimes shoot from his wings against his conscious will in response to his unconscious aggressive drives. The feathers are laced with a neural inhibitor chemical, generated by Archangel's body, which induces temporary paralysis.

These wings allow him to fly at speeds much faster than his natural, feathered wings. The edges of these metal wings are also razor sharp, allowing them to be used as weapons.

After the death of Warren and the Archangel persona via the Life Seed, Angel comes back to life as an amnesiac with healing powers far beyond what he was ever able to originally accomplish, as demonstrated when he resurrects a recently deceased dog.

=== Time-displaced Warren Worthington III ===
The time-displaced Warren, from All-New X-Men, initially started with feathered wings, but during The Black Vortex saga he was imbued with Cosmic wings. These new wings allow him to travel at faster-than-light speeds. He can also discharge cosmic blasts that can destroy spaceships. He can feed off cosmic energy, thus survive in outer space and without sustenance. These wings were surgically removed by a younger version of Cable and replaced with wings that Mimic had copied from Angel in their original meeting, allowing him to be returned to the past with no effect on the timeline.

== Reception ==
=== Critical reception ===
Shawn S. Lealos of Screen Rant ranked Warren 1st in their "X-Men: 10 Most Powerful Horsemen Of Apocalypse" list, while Lukkas Shayo included him in their "10 Iconic New York City-Based Marvel Superheroes We Haven't Seen In The MCU" list. Hilary Goldstein and Richard George of IGN ranked Warren 11th in their "Top 25 X-Men" list. Darren Franich of Entertainment Weekly ranked Warren 40th in their "Let's rank every X-Man ever" list. of ComicsAlliance ranked Warren 75th in their "100 Greatest X-Men of All Time" list. CBR.com ranked Warren 4th in their "X-Men: The 5 Deadliest Members Of The Hellfire Club (& The 5 Weakest)" list, 6th in their "X-Force: 20 Powerful Members" list, 9th in their "10 Most Terrifying X-Men" list, and 10th in their "10 Greatest X-Men, Ranked By Courage" list.

== Literary reception ==
=== Volumes ===
==== Angel: Revelations (2008) ====
According to Diamond Comic Distributors, Angel: Revelations #1 was the 106th best selling comic book in May 2008. Angel: Revelations #2 was the 125th best selling comic book in June 2008.

James Hunt of CBR.com called Angel: Revelations #1 a "prodigious talent on display," saying, "The religious imagery gives the book a consistent motif and the literal "angel" aspect of the character takes a lot more focus that it usually receives when the character is dealt with. Of all the X-Men, Warren probably has the "origin" story that relates itself most directly to the idea of emergent mutant powers being a metaphor for adolescence. Being a Marvel Knights title, it's unclear whether this origin is "in-continuity" or not, but ultimately it shouldn't matter. If the rest of the series is as good as this opening issue, it's going to be an utterly beautiful read and, if you're reading this at a time when it's too late to start collecting the series, it'll almost certainly be worth splashing out for the hardcover just to make sure the format does the story justice. It's definitely good to see Marvel happy to put out a series that looks a little more experimental than their usual fare, and if there's any justice in the industry it'll pay off nicely." Bryan Joel of IGN gave Angel: Revelations #1 a grade of 8.1 out of 10, writing, "Truthfully, Angel's origin probably needed an update. Considering the sort of character he's become and the advancements his powers eventually received, the origin doesn't really line up. Thankfully, Aguirre-Sacasa seems to agree and has crafted Revelations to remedy that. Issue #1 features the basics of Warren immediately pre-power onset, where he's attending a private school and worrying about the changes to his body. The script also interjects a couple scenes of more sinister things going on, which elevates this above the level of simple rehash. There almost seems to be more attention paid to religion, a pet theme of Aguirre-Sacasa's; the title of this series isn't just a play on words. Suffice it to say, I'm surprisingly interested to see how this all plays out. One of the main selling points, though, is the art by Adam Pollina. Probably most renowned for his extended run on the first volume of X-Force, his work in Revelations couldn't be further from the tradition style seen there. Now he's somewhere between Skottie Young and... Salvador Dali, perhaps? But in a good way. I can definitely see how the weird, deformed style will bug some readers, but I think it's deeply engaging and gives the whole issue a more spiritual and mystical feel. It might not be exactly in step with an Angel series, but it's at least something different and I appreciate that."

==== Iceman and Angel (2011) ====
According to Diamond Comic Distributors, Iceman and Angel #1 was the 161st best selling comic book in March 2011.

Ryan K. Lindsay of CBR.com called Iceman and Angel #1 "as much fun as you want, but as pithy as you expect too," asserting, "A one-shot should be a comic that stands on its own, and this issue certainly does that. It needs to give you enough narrative meat to feel like the money was well invested, and this issue mostly does that. It should elicit some form of strong reaction from you in the few pages it has, and this issue works hard to make you laugh and is more successful than not. See Namor score some bagels and Googam become a broheim. It's not earth shattering but it is solid fun and sometimes that's just what you need. Pick up this comic and feel the freedom of old funny done-in-one comics just like they did when you were a kid where the parts add up to greater than the actual whole." David Brothers of ComicsAlliance ranked Iceman and Angel #1 10th in their "10 Top Marvel Comics Coming in March 2011," saying, "One of the best things we don't see much of any more is the relationship between the original X-Men. The modern series is all about hard decisions, hard edges, and hard core self protection, but back in the day, they were just a bunch of kids who hung out together. Iceman and Angel in particular were pretty fun together, because one was a goofball and the other was a self-styled ladies man. Brian Clevinger has proven that he can do stories like this, where he takes a slice of time and expands on it in a meaningful way, and Juan Doe is a pretty great artist. Add in GOOM, a classic Marvel villain, and you've got a story that I think is going to be a pretty good read. X-Men First Class may be dead in name, but these one-shots are doing a pretty good job of keeping the feeling alive."

== Other versions ==
=== 1602 ===
In the 1602 timeline, Warren's counterpart is Werner, a young mutant who was rescued by Carlos Javier after he was nearly executed by Enrique. Werner befriends John Grey, unaware that John actually a woman disguised as a man. This friendship causes jealousy on the part of Scotius Summerisle, who knows of the deception and fears Werner also knows and is trying to court her. They almost come to blows, but reconcile following John's death.

=== Age of Apocalypse ===
In the Age of Apocalypse, Warren is the head of the nightclub Heaven, open to both humans and mutants. When two of his employees, Scarlett MacKenzie and Karma, are apprehended and later killed, Angel finally chooses a side. Strapping himself down with a number of bombs, he attacks Apocalypse's citadel in a suicide run, sacrificing himself to destroy the protective shields surrounding the citadel.

=== Earth X ===
In the alternate universe of Earth X, Warren loses his fortune and becomes a figurative angel, helping anybody who needs him. Later, he travels with Mister Fantastic and others to the Negative Zone in the search for Paradise.

=== Exiles ===
Archangel appears in the comic book Exiles as a member of Weapon X. Archangel is, at some point, replaced by Ms. Marvel after he is supposedly sent home for completing his number of missions. In reality, he is placed in the Panoptichron before being returned to his home universe.

=== Mutant X ===
In Mutant X, Warren was transformed by Apocalypse into a pale, bat-winged form capable of breathing fire. Able to shake off Apocalypse's brainwashing, but still affected by the horrors he has endured, he becomes bitter, and often lashes out at his teammates in the superhero team the Six.

=== Ultimate Marvel ===
In the Ultimate Marvel imprint, Warren manifested his powers at birth and was adopted by Professor X after his parents rejected him. He later appears as a member of Colossus' team, having gained a bird-like appearance through the use of the drug Banshee.

=== X-Men Fairy Tales ===
In X-Men Fairy Tales, Warren's equivalent is Tenshi, a pheasant who suffers from aerophobia until Hitomi and Aoi help him overcome his fears.

=== Time-displaced Warren Worthington III ===
When Beast decides to travel back in time to recruit the original X-Men to stop Scott committing mutant genocide, Angel accompanies his teammates into the future, but initially prefers to return to the past rather than remain in such a twisted present. Even after his teammates vote to remain until they have saved the future, Angel expresses curiosity about what has happened to his own future self, as no reference has been made to his present condition. Frustrated after seeing what will happen to himself in the future, the younger Angel defects from the Jean Grey School for Higher Learning and joins the older Cyclops' new team of outlaw X-Men. After the 2013 "Battle of the Atom" storyline, the rest of the displaced X-Men also join Cyclops' team, except for young Cyclops, who joins his father Corsair and the Starjammers. During the 2015 storyline "The Black Vortex", the younger Warren is imbued with cosmic powers and gains wings made of light. When asked by X-23 why he risked his life to gain new powers, he said he hoped that changing himself will alter his future and prevent him from becoming Archangel. The team eventually return to the past, with Jean planting a psychic block on their memories so that they will forget about their experiences in the future until they catch up with the moment they departed.

== In other media ==
=== Television ===
- Warren Worthington III as Angel appears in "The Sub-Mariner" segment of The Marvel Super Heroes. This version is a member of the Allies for Peace.
- Warren Worthington III as Angel appears in Spider-Man and His Amazing Friends, voiced by William Callaway.
- Warren Worthington III as Angel and Archangel appears in X-Men: The Animated Series, voiced by Stephen Ouimette. This version, while originally unaffiliated with the X-Men, was retconned to be a founding member. He goes to a scientist who claims to be able to cure genetic mutations, but realizes too late that it was Mystique who brainwashes him into becoming Apocalypse's Horseman Death. Under Apocalypse's control, Worthington battles the X-Men until Rogue absorbs his dark side. Afterwards, Worthington sets out on a quest to get revenge on Apocalypse, with Rogue joining him in the hopes of dissuading him. Along the way, Worthington learns that he will join the X-Men in the future.
  - Warren Worthington III as Archangel appears in X-Men '97, voiced by Christopher Barger.
- Warren Worthington III as Angel appears in X-Men: Evolution, voiced by Mark Hildreth. This version is a young multi-billionaire who donned a costume and mask to perform heroic deeds in New York City until his actions draw Magneto's attention. Worthington would later join the X-Men and aid in their fight against Apocalypse.
- Warren Worthington III as Angel and Archangel appears in Wolverine and the X-Men, voiced by Liam O'Brien. This version is initially a member of the X-Men until a falling out with his father leads to the Mutant Response Division damaging his wings. Worthington seeks out Mister Sinister who converts him into Archangel and recruits him into the Marauders.
- Warren Worthington III as Archangel appears in the Marvel Anime: X-Men episode "Destiny - Bond".

=== Film ===
- Warren Worthington III as Angel appears in an early draft of X-Men, but did not make it past pre-production.
- Warren Worthington III as Archangel was going to appear in X2 as one of William Stryker's experiments, but was cut from the film. Despite this, an x-ray image displaying him appears in one of Stryker's labs.
- Warren Worthington III as Angel appears in X-Men: The Last Stand, portrayed by Ben Foster as a young adult, and Cayden Boyd as a child. This version's mutation inspired his industrialist father Warren Worthington II to create a "mutant cure".
- A viral marketing website for X-Men: Days of Future Past reveals Warren Worthington III / Angel was killed in 2011 by Sentinels during a mutant protest march against the Sentinel program.
- Warren Worthington III appears as Angel and Archangel in X-Men: Apocalypse, portrayed by Ben Hardy. This version's wings possess sharp talons and hails from the 1980s. He initially works as a cage fighter before he is injured by Nightcrawler, transformed by Apocalypse, and recruited into the latter's Horsemen. In his new form, Worthington battles Nightcrawler once more until the former is knocked unconscious by a crashing airplane and later abandoned by Apocalypse for his failure.
- Warren Worthington III as Angel will appear in the untitled X-Men film (2028) set in the Marvel Cinematic Universe, portrayed by Asa Germann.

=== Video games ===
- Warren Worthington III as Archangel appears as an assist character in X-Men.
- Warren Worthington III as Archangel appears as a playable character in the X-Men II: The Fall of the Mutants.
- Warren Worthington III as Archangel appears in Chun-Li's ending in X-Men vs. Street Fighter.
- André Sogliuzzo is credited as Angel in X-Men Legends, but the character does not appear in the game. Despite this, the character's model files and icons exist in the game's assets.
- Warren Worthington III as Angel and Archangel appears in X-Men Legends II: Rise of Apocalypse, voiced by Dave Wittenberg. Angel initially serves as a scout for the X-Men until Apocalypse captures him and tasks Mister Sinister with turning him into Archangel.
- Warren Worthington III as Angel appears in Magneto's ending in Marvel vs. Capcom 3: Fate of Two Worlds.
- Warren Worthington III as Archangel appears in Deadpool's ending in Ultimate Marvel vs. Capcom 3. This version is a member of X-Force.
- Warren Worthington III as Angel and Archangel appears as separate playable characters in Marvel Super Hero Squad Online, voiced by Antony Del Rio and Chris Cox respectively.
- Warren Worthington III as Angel appears as a playable character in Marvel: Avengers Alliance.
- Warren Worthington III as Archangel appears as a playable character in Lego Marvel Super Heroes, voiced by Will Friedle.
- Warren Worthington III as Angel and Archangel appear as non-playable characters (NPCs) in Marvel Heroes.
- Warren Worthington III as Archangel appears as a playable character in Marvel Contest of Champions.
- Warren Worthington III as Angel appears as playable character in Marvel Future Fight.
- Warren Worthington III as Angel and Archangel appear as playable characters in Marvel Puzzle Quest.
- Warren Worthington III as Angel appears as a playable character in Marvel Super War.
- Warren Worthington III as Angel appears in Marvel Snap.

=== Books ===
- Warren Worthington III as Archangel appears in Planet X.
- Warren Worthington III as Archangel appears in the Mutant Empire trilogy.
- Warren Worthington III appears in The Ultimate X-Men story "On The Air", by Glenn Hauman.
- Warren Worthington III as Angel appears in the novelization of X-Men: The Last Stand.

== Collected editions ==
Title	Material collected	Published date	ISBN
X-Men: Angel Revelations	Angel: Revelations #1-5	January 2009	978-0785134688
