= All-New X-Men =

Marvel comic book series

- Cover of All-New X-Men #1 (January 2013). Art by Stuart Immonen and Wade Von Grawbadger.

Publication information
- Publisher: Marvel Comics
- Schedule: Biweekly
- Format: Ongoing series
- Genre: Superhero
- Publication date: List: (vol. 1) January 2013 – August 2015 (vol. 2) January 2016 – May 2017
- No. of issues: List: vol. 1: 41 vol. 2: 19
- Main character: List: Angel Beast Cyclops Genesis Iceman Oya Wolverine (X-23) Jean Grey Kitty Pryde

Creative team
- Created by: Brian Michael Bendis; Stuart Immonen
- Written by: List: (vol. 1) Brian Bendis (vol. 2) Dennis Hopeless
- Penciller: List: (vol. 1) Stuart Immonen Mahmud Asrar (vol. 2) Mark Bagley
- Inker: List: (vol. 1) Wade Von Grawbadger (vol. 2) Andrew Hennessy
- Letterer: List: (vol. 1-2) Cory Petit
- Colorist: List: (vol. 1) Marte Gracia Rain Beredo (vol. 2) Nolan Woodard
- Editor: List: Assistant editor: Jordan D. White Xander Jarowey Editor: Nick Lowe Mike Marts Editor-in-chief: Axel Alonso

All-New X-Men is a comic book series published by Marvel Comics that debuted in November 2012, with the launch of Marvel NOW!. The series centers on the five original X-Men, brought from the past to the present to confront their future counterparts. The series replaced Uncanny X-Men vol. 2 as the flagship book of the X-Men franchise.

== Publication history ==
Marvel Comics announced All-New X-Men by the creative team of Brian Michael Bendis and Stuart Immonen in July 2012. Bendis stated that the idea of having the five original members of the X-Men (Warren Worthington III, Beast, Cyclops, Iceman, and Jean Grey) see what has become of the X-Men came to him during a company retreat for Avengers vs. X-Men, "Avengers Vs. X-Men led to it. It was an idea that had been floating around the X-Office for a while and I'm still unclear where exactly it percolated. I'm a big fan of these kinds of stories, Pleasantville or Peggy Sue Got Married, where a character faces the truth about themselves and what their life can mean versus what it does mean." Bendis said that the five original X-Men not only come into contact with the present day Cyclops's team of X-Men but with Wolverine's team of X-Men as well, "We'll have three factions, and all these characters are interacting. It's almost like a Robert Altman movie. Plus, there will also be some new characters that you haven't met before."

Following the events of the "Battle of the Atom" story arc, the time-displaced X-Men, led by Kitty Pryde, moved to the modern day Cyclops's New Xavier School following a disagreement with the Jean Grey School X-Men members. They were joined a few issues later by X-23, who had just survived the events of Avengers Arena. The team then took to space in a crossover event, "The Trial of Jean Grey", with Bendis's Guardians of the Galaxy series as part of All-New Marvel NOW!. Following the crossover, the young time-displaced Cyclops was spun off to his own solo series, Cyclops, which had him and his father, Corsair, journey through outer space together. After the series was cancelled upon the end of the Inhumans vs. X-Men storyline, the story of the All-New X-Men was continued in the new series X-Men Blue.

== Plot summary ==
=== Yesterday's X-Men ===
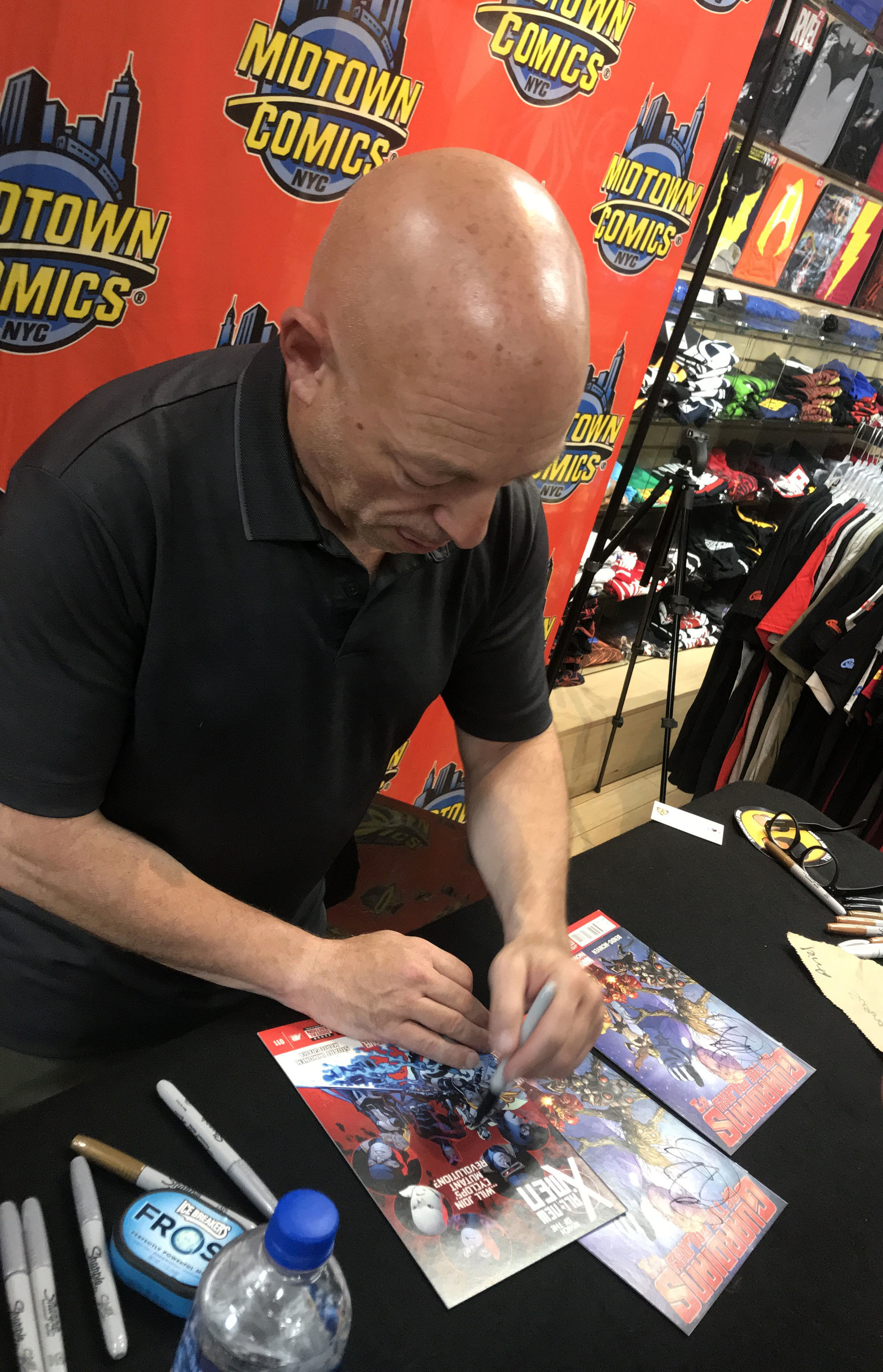
Writer Brian Michael Bendis signing a copy of the book at Midtown Comics

Following Cyclops's escape from prison after the war with the Avengers, he, Emma Frost, Magik, and Magneto begin a crusade against mutant persecution, freeing mutants who are being held prisoner after their powers have manifested, violently striking out at the humans responsible at the same time. As the other X-Men bemoan their inability to strike back at Cyclops's actions without triggering a mutant civil war, a frustrated comment by Iceman about how the present Cyclops has created the mutant apocalyptic nightmare that the past Cyclops would not tolerate, and Storm says "I know, Bobby! I know." inspires Beast to take action; he travels back in time to the early days of the Xavier Institute shortly after Professor X has taken a leave of absence and Beast's younger self was about to temporarily leave the X-Men for the first time to recruit their assistance, informing them that Cyclops must come to the future to stop himself from committing mutant genocide.

Although shocked at the news of Cyclops's future, as well as the discovery that he has killed Professor X in the future, the young X-Men decide to help Beast, the younger version recognizing that he would not do something like this unless it was necessary. After arriving in the future at the Jean Grey School of Higher Learning, during which Wolverine instinctively attacks Cyclops before Jean Grey knocks him out, Beast collapses, and the younger version of Beast reveals that his future self is dying; his actions are the result of his desire to accomplish something good in the time he has left to live. Although shaken at the future they have witnessed as they are isolated in one of the rooms, Jean reads Wolverine's mind when he tries to send them back to their own time, noting that, while he is consciously against their presence, he is inwardly grateful to Beast for taking this chance. When they hear news of a mutant riot, young Cyclops reaffirms his dedication to Xavier's dream of peace and the five original X-Men depart in a new Blackbird, determined to confront the future Cyclops.

While talking to Magneto, the present Cyclops realises that their powers are fluctuating after their exposure to the Phoenix Force; he can contain his optical blasts without his visor, but has trouble maintaining them when they are used, and Magneto is having trouble with his own powers. They attempt to rescue Emma Frost from captivity, but she is also having trouble with her powers as her telepathy appears to be weakened even if she can still turn into her diamond form. Magik, however, has gained new abilities from her exposure to the Phoenix Force. Having set up a base in an old Weapon X facility, Cyclops and Magneto depart to rescue a new group of mutants, but are subsequently confronted by the original X-Men, with the young Cyclops challenging his future self to justify his current talk of a "revolution".

Shocked to see his younger self and Jean, Cyclops wonders if they are a psychic illusion. He realizes that they are real and lack context to the position he is in. His thoughts cause Jean's latent telepathy to activate and she hears him admit that he killed Xavier. Unable to control her telepathy and overwhelmed, she reveals that Cyclops killed Xavier and lashes out with her telekinesis; Cyclops's visor is knocked away and, unable to control his optic blasts, he levels the area, before Magik is able to extract him and Magneto. The young X-Men are confused by Magneto's willingness to flee from a fight and surprised that Cyclops attacked them. The team returns to the Jean Grey School to return to their time, disconcerted by what they've seen, but find that the present version of Beast has gone into cardiac arrest.

While the present Cyclops recruits Benjamin Deeds (a mutant who can mimic the appearance of others), the temporally-relocated Jean uses her telepathy to help the two Hanks make mental contact with each other. The two emerge from the school, the older Hank reverted to a more human-like appearance. Although Wolverine is in favour of the original team returning to the past and having their memories erased, Jean refuses to depart until they have saved the future. Scott attempts to talk to Jean, but she orders him to stay away from her.

=== Here to Stay ===
Jean is overwhelmed by her telepathy, but Kitty and Storm are able to calm her using a technique she will learn in the future. They also suggest that Jean should serve as team leader of the originals during their time in the present, as Cyclops's actions make the students reluctant to trust him. Meanwhile, Angel encounters his future self. The Warren of the present is casually cheery about his past self's presence, while the younger Warren is confused at his future self's metallic wings. The younger Warren attempts to return to the past, but Jean erases his memories. At the Jean Grey School for Higher Learning, the adult Cyclops appears with Magik, Emma Frost, and Magneto proclaiming "To me, my X-Men".

=== Out of Their Depth ===
Cyclops arrives to recruit more X-Men. While Wolverine and Cyclops argue about the original X-Men's returning to their time, the Stepford Cuckoos converse with Emma Frost concerning Jean Grey's current lack of control over her telepathy. Meanwhile, Lady Mastermind, Mystique, and Sabretooth rob banks under the illusion of the time-displaced X-Men and Wolverine's attacking them. Back at the Jean Grey School, the Stepford Cuckoos join Cyclops and, with much surprise and shock, the time-displaced Angel also joins him. Before being teleported away, the Stepford Cuckoos soundly defeat Jean Grey in a psychic battle for attempting to control Angel's mind. While flying in the Blackbird trying to find Mystique, the young X-Men, along with Shadowcat and Wolverine, are intercepted by the Uncanny Avengers.

The Uncanny Avengers believe that the time-displaced X-Men are responsible for the attacks on the banks. Havok and the time-displaced Cyclops are shocked to see each other, as Cyclops thought that his brother was dead. Jean Grey, using her telepathy to see that the Scarlet Witch decimated the mutant population, loses her temper and telekinetically attacks her and the Avengers. She is stopped by the Scarlet Witch, and the situation is explained to her, although she is furious and distraught. Wolverine then reveals to the time-displaced X-Men that they are going to confront Mystique.

The X-Men search for Mystique, and eventually locate her hideout, where she welcomes Madame Hydra and the new Silver Samurai, revealing to them her plan of buying Madripoor. Both groups watch Havok's recent speech about the "M-word", and Kitty Pryde disagrees with the speech. Although Wolverine and Kitty Pryde order the time-displaced X-Men not to follow them, they go after them and, as a battle ensues, Lady Mastermind apparently causes Jean Grey to manifest the Phoenix Force, much to the shock of others. The X-Men and Brotherhood are frozen in distress as Lady Mastermind angrily persuades Jean to kill them all. While Jean proceeds to blame Mystique for causing this, Wolverine prepares to kill Jean in order to stop her from using a power that she cannot control. As Wolverine slashes Jean, it is revealed this is a psychic vision of the Phoenix that Jean manifested into the minds of the Brotherhood, and that inadvertently entered the minds of Wolverine, Kitty, and the other X-Men. Mastermind creates one final illusion that she and Sabretooth use to escape, but Mystique is caught and sent to "The Cage", an extra-max prison (from which she quickly escapes). The team now has some time to relax, so Bobby and Scott go to a carnival and try to pick up some teenage girls. Jean Grey practices her telekinetic skills with older Beast and destroy Wolverine's motorcycle. While putting it back together she reads Beast's mind and discovers that Beast had a long-time crush that he never pursued in respect for Scott Summers. Jean then confront time-displaced Beast and the two share their feeling and a romantic kiss.

=== Arms of the Octopus ===
This crossover event included The Superior Spider-Man and the Hulk. The team decides to travel to New York City to unwind and have fun. Beast is still baffled by the kiss with Jean, especially when she and Scott go to the movies together. He decides to try his luck with the ladies before he turns blue and has no chance. He meets a girl in Central Park reading Anne Sexton and realizes that she's a student at Empire University and studied with the same gamma radiation-focused professor he had when he was young, David Jude. They visit his lab, which is small compared to his previous facilities. It seems after the Hulk was exposed to gamma radiation, the field is no longer favorable. The lab is suddenly attacked by Doctor Octopus. Superior Spider-Man comes and assists the X-Men in dispatching the villain. Superior Spider-Man assures the group that he is the real Doctor Octopus. They decide to bring in Bruce Banner to assist with the research since Doctor Octopus is teeming with gamma radiation. Suddenly, a younger version of the Abomination, who has been dead for several years, appears. The theory is that Doctor Octopus and Abomination followed the X-Men from the past, Superior Spider-Man is worried that if his past self is killed or not returned he will either die, vanish or create a time paradox, so they fly to Westchester with the X-Men while Beast and Hulk deal with The Abomination. Hulk destroys Abomination, who turns out to be an advanced robot, and the Doctor Octopus robots blows up almost killing Spider-Man and the X-Men. Jude feels slighted by the Hulk for destroying the gamma radiation field of study and wanted to use the X-Men's time machine to travel back in time to kill Banner. Jude imbued himself with gamma radiation and is able to discharge energy. Superior Spider-Man and the X-Men are having a difficult time dispatching him, but it was really meant to distract him while Hulk delivered a large energy prison to trap Jude. Superior Spider-Man contemplates using the time machine to travel in time and convince his younger self to join the Avengers instead of becoming a villain, but he then realizes that he would never become Superior Spider-Man and would not appreciate doing good unless he was a villain.

=== Battle of the Atom ===
The story involves the X-Men of the future traveling to present time in order to force the All-New X-Men (original five X-Men) to return to their rightful time, as their presence in the current timeline will result in disastrous consequences.

=== All-Different ===
Following the events of Battle of the Atom, Kitty Pryde takes a leave of absence from the Jean Grey School to help mentor the original 5 X-Men who have joined Cyclops's New Xavier School for the Gifted to better help change the uncertain future. They encounter and battle the Purifiers hunting new mutants, which results in X-23 being recruited to the team. Cyclops and X-23 begin to develop a relationship.

=== Trial of Jean Grey ===
Soon Jean Grey is then kidnapped by the Shi'ar to pay for her future self's actions as the Dark Phoenix in the "Trial of Jean Grey". This led to an alliance between the X-Men and Guardians of the Galaxy and a confrontation with the Shi'ar Imperial Guard. While on trial, Jean was shown her entire future and death in a brief psychic surge. As the X-Men and Guardians attempt to rescue Jean, they are helped by the Starjammers. After making it back to Earth, another confrontation with the Imperial Guard ensues. All the pressure built up from her knowledge of her future, plus the newfound information of the death of her family and entire bloodline at the hands of the Shi'ar in the End of Greys, causes Jean to discover a new ability. Using this new power to absorb psionic energy and combining it with her telepathy and telekinesis, Jean rebuffs Gladiator and destroys a Shi'ar Warship. Cyclops then leaves with his father Corsair and the rest of the Starjammers.

=== One Down ===
Present Beast is visited by the Watcher who shows him multiple realities that will never occur due to his meddling with time. Back at Cyclops's New Xavier School for the Gifted, X-23 leaves the school upset about Scott leaving with the Starjammers. She then gets stabbed by Raze Darkholme, who shapeshifted into Scott. Raze then sneaks into the school pretending to be X-23. The Future Brotherhood of Evil Mutants then attack the school. It turns out that after the Battle of the Atom, Raze sends himself a message into the future to warn himself that they lose the Battle of the Atom and need a new strategy—use the Cuckoos to take out the team and neutralize Jean. What he didn't expect was X-23 healing herself and returning to the base. X-23 was able to sneak in thanks to Jean's Psychic shielding and stabs Charles. It turns out the Brotherhood has been under Charles psychic manipulation the entire time. Charles then forces the X-Men to fight each other, but the Brotherhood, no longer under Charles' control, fight him. After the battle the Brotherhood agree to return to the future peacefully and Raze and Charles are sent to The Cage, an extra-max prison for super villains. Charles is depowered while in prison, but he is allowed to write a note, which he writes for his future self to warn him about the loss.

In the aftermath, Angel and X-23 have some time to bond and start a relationship. Kitty and Star-Lord continue their long-distance relationship by chatting via hologram. Jean Grey and Emma Frost have a psychic sparring session, but eventually bond and finally become friends. Current Beast, current Bobby Drake and Storm find the school to announce that Scott Summers is needed in Westchester for the reading of Charles Xavier's last will and testament.

=== The Ultimate Adventure ===
While the staff of the New Xavier School for mutants travel to Westchester for the reading of Xavier's last will and testament, the students inspect Cerebro. They notice a new mutant appear in Texas, so they decide to visit the mutant. It turns out she is a teleporter and in a panic teleports them into the Ultimate Marvel universe by accident. Jean Grey meets with the new Spider-Man, Iceman stumbles into Mole Man's lair, Angel and X-23 meet up with Wolverine's son and the Ultimate X-Men. They all join up to save Beast, who was captured by Doctor Doom. They eventually track down the girl and teleport back to Earth-616, but right before Jean Grey gives Miles Morales a kiss.

Returning to their universe, the team are reunited with Cyclops when they are called upon to aid the Guardians of the Galaxy in retrieving the fabled Black Vortex. Cyclops, Iceman and Groot become superpowered by the Vortex and return it to Captain Marvel.

=== The Utopians ===
Emma Frost takes the young Jean Grey to Madripoor to train her powers. She takes away Jean's telepathy and forces her to face off with The Blob using only her telekinesis and wits. Soon after Cyclops rejoins the team. The team encounters the Guardians of the Galaxy while hunting down The Black Vortex, during a storyline in which Angel gets cosmic powered wings.

Upon their return they are asked by S.H.I.E.L.D. to investigate a disturbance in the derelict mutant island Utopia, off the coast of San Francisco. The all new X-men investigate with Magik and discover Random, Masque, Boom-Boom, Elixir, Madison Jeffries, and Karma trying to create a new settlement. After an initial disagreement, the two groups battle, but Jean Grey eventually mind blends with Karma and learns about the difficult times these mutants had since Cyclops killed Professor Xavier. The X-Men tell S.H.I.E.L.D. that the vagrant mutants escaped, but actually teleported them to the New Xavier School for Mutants. Afterward, the team decides to go their separate ways for a time, and try to better understand the new era in which they are in; effectively going hiatus from the X-Men.

=== Ghosts of Cyclops ===
About eight months later the All-New X-Men decide to reunite and go on a worldwide road trip in Hank's "Nerd Wagon", which is a converted VW Bus the interior of which defies physics and is actually a large apartment and lab. Oya, Kid Apocalypse, and Pickles the Bamf have joined the team after Kitty Pryde's departure, though Jean Grey has joined up with Storm's team of X-Men. X-23 has taken on the mantle of the All-New Wolverine, and Angel doesn't appreciate her reckless fighting style. After the older Scott Summers's death, the young Scott also parted ways. He has been hunting a rogue team of mutants that call themselves the "Ghosts of Cyclops." They wear Cyclops masks and claim to spread his message, but are really thugs that use the chaos to steal. Eventually Scott finds them, but gets himself and the leader of the Ghosts arrested; however, the rest of the X-Men track him down and bust him out of jail, but only after a scuffle with the rest of the Ghosts who also came to spring their leader. The team then uses a portable Cerebro and algorithm from Twitter to track new mutants and criminal attacks. This leads them to Paris, France, where Blob is causing a disturbance by stealing an endangered animal and forcing famous chefs to cook it. The team has difficulty subduing him and X-23 is beaten within inches of her life, so in an act of partial desperation and part foolhardiness, Angel uses his new cosmic wings in a fireblast that incapacitates the Blob. X-23 is upset that he acted so reckless, but Angel pointed out that how he feels when Laura jumps headfirst into battle and get hurt—only to be saved by her healing powers. Emotionally he cannot continue his relationship with her. During the fight, they do not realize that Toad kidnapped Scott Summers. Later, though, Angel and X-23 rekindle their relationship.

=== Apocalypse Wars ===
The X-Men are able to track Cyclops into the Catacombs of Paris. He is in critical condition from a cave-in, so Beast tried to use the best modern medicine has to offer to revive him. Cyclops isn't responding, so he tries alternative methods and consults Dr. Strange. Dr. Strange is in the middle of investigating the Empirikul. He gives Beast the Third Eye of Horus to show him the realm between science and mysticism. Beast then shows him that even magic has a scientific base and points out his spells are based on mathematical theorems and there are flaws in the computations. Dr. Strange thanks him for enlightening him and leaves him the mask. Later on Evan's birthday, Evan goes to Beast's lab and tries on the mask, both of them are teleported into ancient Egypt and encounter a teenage En Sabah Nur. Unlike his future self, this En Sabah Nur is generous and selflessly protects his friends. His father is an evil sand raider. Evan attempts to spirit him away to Greece before he can turn evil, but Beast gets captured by the founder of Clan Akkaba, so En Sabah Nur refuses to leave him behind. Evan and En Sabah Nur both knowingly run into a trap to save Beast, but En Sabah Nur gets captured, then Beast forces Evan to return to the future. Evan is furious, since he had an opportunity to prevent En Sabah Nur from turning evil.

=== Hell Hath So Much Fury ===
Recovering from his fight with Toad, which has left him unable to walk, Cyclops compiles a list of solo missions to occupy Wolverine who is feeling restless after her breakup with Angel. Wolverine finds that several of the enemies have already been defeated and, during a fight against some demons, discovers that Angel is responsible. Teaming up against the demons, the pair reconcile and get back together. Oya and Evan try to boost Bobby's self-esteem by taking him to a gay bar so that he can get used to flirting with guys. Bobby is extremely nervous and embarrasses himself, running out of the bar and crashing into Romeo, a boy he instantly feels comfortable with. Romeo explains that he is looking for a friend and the pair are interrupted when a moth-like NuHuman attacks them. Bobby, Evan and Oya try to bring it down but Romeo reveals that he is an Inhuman who is part of Crystal's team and that he is trying to help the NuHuman. He uses his powers to calm the NuHuman, explaining that his is an emotional empath. Bobby figures that this is the reason he felt at ease and not because he and Romeo genuinely connected however, Romeo surprises him by giving Bobby his number before returning to Attilan with Crystal. Meanwhile, Cyclops is getting bored of being cooped up by himself and tries to get into Hank's lab, noting that Hank has locked himself inside ever since he and Evan returned from Egypt. His attempts fail and he is suddenly attacked by a huge demon. Similarly, Bobby, Evan and Oya also come into contact with demons Hank reveals that he is responsible for the demon outbreak, as he had been experimenting with black magic in an attempt to unlock the secrets of time travel to return them home. The demons are led by Madelyne Pryor (from Secret Wars) who seems to be getting the upper hand before Hank uses a magic spell to transform himself into a beast-like demon and banish her.

=== Inhuman War ===
Bobby's relationship has been slowly developing with Romeo but the two are caught in the middle when the X-Men declare war on the Inhumans. Beast reveals to Bobby that the Terrigen cloud travelling the globe will collapse, making the Earth uninhabitable to mutants so the decision has been made to attack New Attilan in an attempt to destroy the cloud. Bobby joins the other X-Men in the attack so that he can find Romeo and the pair escape from the battle. Cyclops is briefly possessed by the body-jumping Inhuman Mosaic, which allows him to 'see' some of the memories Mosaic has acquired from past hosts, including the memory of how his future self actually died in the first release of the Terrigen cloud and Emma simply used his image to make a stand against the Inhumans. Thus assured that his future self was not a monster, when Jean returns to them, Cyclops suggests that they return to the past, but Beast reveals that he recently managed to go back through a complex system of science and magic, only to find that the five of them are 'already' there, fighting Unus the Untouchable, just as the history of this timeline records. Although Cyclops briefly argues that they may simply come from an alternate timeline, Jean and Hank convince him to accept the idea that they are in a new world with no obligation to go back to the past. With this revelation, the X-Men decide to leave the X-Mansion and travel the world to make their own way, leaving a recorded message via the Danger Room to assure the modern team that they are safe.

=== X-Men: Blue ===
During the young team's travels, they begin working with Magneto as a teacher, Magneto wanting to use them to set an example to the world that he couldn't. In the course of their travels, they recruited new members from other realities in the form of Jimmy Hudson - the son of a parallel version of Wolverine - and a version of Storm who was a vampire. The team learn that their brief trip to the past was actually a trip to the true past; the X-Men they saw were actually another iteration of the future Brotherhood that went back in time and took their places, creating a corrupted timeline where the X-Men took over the world. The team are able to prevent this scheme, but decided not to remain in the past at this time as they had to return to their era at the time when they had left it.

The team subsequently joined forces with Venom to save Corsair from a space pirate bonded to another symbiote, returning to Earth to fight off an invasion of the Poisons, a species that sought symbiotes across the multiverse. Jean Grey is briefly consumed by the Poisons, but overcomes their influence from within, allowing her to disrupt the entire Poison hive mind. This essentially destroys all of the Poisons while allowing some of them to be returned to their original state.

=== Extermination ===
The entire X-Men team find themselves hunted on two fronts with one group being the mutant-hunter Ahab from a dark possible future where he has turned various mutants into his 'hounds' to hunt their fellows, and another being a younger version of Cable who is so determined to send the young X-Men back to their own time that he actually kills his own future self to stop him interfering, as well as performing 'surgery' to restore Warren's original feathered wings. After Mimic is killed when he acts as a decoy to save young Cyclops, the original five accept the need to return home, but only after taking a detour into the future to meet the younger versions of Ahab's key mutant soldiers, allowing Jean to learn how their powers work. With this new knowledge, Jean is able to program a 'time delay' on the original five's memories once they return to the past, erasing all knowledge of events in the future until they reach that point, simultaneously granting the present Jean with knowledge of how to stop the Hounds. The timeline is thus restored to its original course, with Jean, Hank, Warren and Bobby meeting for milkshakes to talk about their new memories, unaware that young-Cable is talking with a now-alive adult Cyclops.

== Collected editions ==
=== TPBs/Marvel Premiere Edition hardcovers ===
==== Volume 1 ====
Title	Material collected	Pages	Publication date	ISBN
All-New X-Men, Volume 1: Yesterday's X-Men	All-New X-Men (vol. 1) #1-5	136	April 9, 2013	Hardcover: 978-0785168201; Paperback: 978-0785166375
All-New X-Men, Volume 2: Here to Stay	All-New X-Men (vol. 1) #6-10	136	June 11, 2013	Hardcover: 978-0785168218; Paperback: 978-0785166382
All-New X-Men, Volume 3: Out of Their Depth	All-New X-Men (vol. 1) #11-15	136	October 8, 2013	Hardcover: 978-0785168225; Paperback: 978-0785166399
All-New X-Men/Indestructible Hulk/Superior Spider-Man: The Arms of the Octopus	All-New X-Men Special (vol. 1) #1; Indestructible Hulk Special (vol. 1) #1; Superior Spider-Man Team-Up Special (vol. 1) #1; Wolverine: in the Flesh #1	96	January 21, 2014	Paperback: 978-0785184386
X-Men: Battle of the Atom	X-Men: Battle of the Atom (vol. 1) #1-2; All-New X-Men (vol. 1) #16-17; X-Men (vol. 4) #5-6; Uncanny X-Men (vol. 3) #12-13; Wolverine and the X-Men (vol. 1) #36-37	224	July 22, 2014	Hardcover: 978-0785189060; Paperback: 978-0785189077
All-New X-Men, Volume 4: All-Different	All-New X-Men (vol. 1) #18-21; X-Men: Gold (vol. 1) #1	144	May 20, 2014	Hardcover: 978-0785188605; Paperback: 978-1846535857
Guardians of the Galaxy/All-New X-Men: The Trial of Jean Grey	All-New X-Men (vol. 1) #22-24; Guardians of the Galaxy (vol. 3) #11-13	144	June 17, 2014	Hardcover: 978-0785168300; Paperback: 978-1846536083
All-New X-Men, Volume 5: One Down	All-New X-Men (vol. 1) #25-30	152	September 23, 2014	Hardcover: 978-0785154334; Paperback: 978-0785189688
All-New X-Men, Volume 6: The Ultimate Adventure	All-New X-Men (vol. 1) #31-36	136	March 31, 2015	Hardcover: 978-0785154341; Paperback: 978-0785189695
All-New X-Men, Volume 7: The Utopians	All-New X-Men (vol. 1) #37-41	136	July 7, 2015	Hardcover: 978-0785192404; Paperback: 978-0785192350

==== Volume 2 ====
Title	Material collected	Pages	Publication date	ISBN
All-New X-Men: Inevitable Vol. 1: Ghosts of the Cyclops	All-New X-Men (vol. 2) #1-6	112	May 17, 2016	Paperback: 978-0785196303
X-Men: Apocalypse Wars	All-New X-Men (vol. 2) #9-11, Extraordinary X-Men (vol. 1) #8-12, Uncanny X-Men (vol. 4) #6-10	336	October 18, 2016	Hardcover: 978-1302902452
All-New X-Men: Inevitable Vol. 2: Apocalypse Wars	All-New X-Men (vol. 2) #7-11	120	October 25, 2016	Paperback: 978-0785196310
All-New X-Men: Inevitable Vol. 3: Hell Hath So Much Fury	All-New X-Men (vol. 2) #12-16	112	March 7, 2017	Paperback: 978-1302902919
All-New X-Men: Inevitable Vol. 4: IvX	All-New X-Men (vol. 2) #17-19, All-New X-Men Annual (vol. 2) #1	128	July 3, 2017	Paperback: 978-1302905231

=== Oversized hardcovers ===
#	Title	Years covered	Material collected	Pages	Released	ISBN
1	All-New X-Men Vol. 1	2013	All-New X-Men (vol. 1) #1–10	272	1 Oct 2014	Stuart Immonen cover: 978-0785191155
2	All-New X-Men Vol. 2	2013-2014	All-New X-Men (vol. 1) #11–15, 18–21; X-Men: Gold	272	2 Sep 2015	Stuart Immonen cover: 978-0785198222
	X-Men: Battle Of The Atom	2013	All-New X-Men (vol. 1) #16–17, Uncanny X-Men (vol. 3) #12–13, X-Men: Battle Of The Atom #1–2, X-Men (vol. 4) #5–6, Wolverine & the X-Men #36–37	248	8 Jan 2014	Arthur Adams cover: 978-0785189060
3	All-New X-Men Vol. 3	2014	All-New X-Men (vol. 1) #22–30, Guardians Of The Galaxy (2013) #11–13	288	2 Dec 2015	Stuart Immonen cover: 978-0785198239
	Guardians Of The Galaxy / X-Men: The Black Vortex	2014	The Black Vortex: Alpha; The Black Vortex: Omega; Guardians Of The Galaxy (2013) #24–25; Legendary Star-Lord #9–11; All-New X-Men #38–39; Guardians Team-Up #3; Nova #28; Cyclops #12; Captain Marvel #14	312	1 Jul 2015	Ed McGuinness cover: 978-0785197706
4	All-New X-Men Vol. 4	2014-2015	All-New X-Men (vol. 1) #31–41	288	4 May 2016	Stuart Immonen cover: 978-0785199892
	All-New X-Men by Brian Michael Bendis	2012-2015	All-New X-Men #1–15, 18–41; Guardians Of The Galaxy (2013) #11-13	1,048	12 Aug 2025	Stuart Immonen cover: 978-1302966348
	All-New X-Men by Brian Michael Bendis	2012-2015	All-New X-Men #1–15, 18–41; Guardians Of The Galaxy (2013) #11-13	1,048	12 Aug 2025	Alex Ross DM cover: 978-1302966355
