= Beast (Marvel Comics) =

Marvel Comics character

- The different forms of Beast on a variant cover of Powers of X #2 (August 2019). Art by Patrick Zircher.

Publication information
- Publisher: Marvel Comics
- First appearance: X-Men #1 (September 1963)
- Created by: Stan Lee (writer/editor); Jack Kirby (artist/co-plotter)

In-story information
- Alter ego: Dr. Henry Philip "Hank" McCoy
- Species: Human mutant
- Team affiliations: X-Men; Avengers; Defenders; X-Factor; Illuminati; Secret Avengers; 3K
- Notable aliases: Kreature; Wildlife; Chairman
- Abilities: Genius-level intellect; Superhuman strength, stamina, durability, speed, agility, reflexes, dexterity, healing, longevity, and senses; Proficient scientist and engineer; Timestream attunement; Pheromone manipulation; Razor-sharp fangs and claws

Beast is a fictional character appearing in American comic books published by Marvel Comics and is a founding member of the X-Men. The character was introduced as a mutant possessing ape-like superhuman physical strength and agility, oversized hands and feet, a genius-level intellect, and otherwise normal appearance and speech. Eventually being referred to simply as "Beast", Dr. Henry Philip "Hank" McCoy underwent progressive physiological transformations, gaining animalistic physical characteristics. These include blue fur, both simian and feline facial features, pointed ears, fangs, and claws. Beast's physical strength and senses increased to even greater levels.

Despite his feral appearance, he is depicted as a brilliant, well-educated man in the arts and sciences, known for his witty sense of humor, and characteristically uses barbed witticisms with long words and intellectual references to distract his foes. He is a world authority on biochemistry and genetics, the X-Men's medical doctor, and the science and mathematics instructor at the Xavier Institute (the X-Men's headquarters and school for young mutants). He is also a mutant political activist, campaigning against society's bigotry and discrimination against mutants. While fighting his own bestial instincts and fears of social rejection, Beast dedicates his physical and mental gifts to the creation of a better world for man and mutant.

One of the original X-Men, Beast has appeared regularly in X-Men-related comics since his debut. He has also been a member of the Avengers and Defenders. Various storylines over the years have hinted that Beast has capacity to become a supervillain; his alternative universe counterpart Dark Beast was a recurring character in 2000s and 2010s comics. During the Krakoan Age 2020s X-Men storylines, Beast assumes an antagonistic role to the other X-Men, becoming an outright villain. At the end of the Krakoan Age, Hank ultimately dies in an act of last minute redemption, and is replaced by a younger clone of himself whose memories stop short of the events which corrupted Beast.

Beast survived the explosion and transferred his consciousness into a white-furred synthetic body. He becomes the head of the organization 3K, which seeks to forcibly mutate humans so that mutants outnumber humanity.

The character has also appeared in media adaptations, including animated television series and feature films. Beast has been a cast member in all X-Men animated series, most notably in X-Men: The Animated Series (1992–97), voiced by George Buza, a role he reprised in the series' revival X-Men '97 (2024–present). Kelsey Grammer and Nicholas Hoult have portrayed the character in 20th Century Fox's X-Men film series (2006–2019). Grammer reprises the role in the Marvel Cinematic Universe films The Marvels (2023) and Avengers: Doomsday (2026).

== Publication history ==
=== 1960s ===
Created by writer Stan Lee and artist and co-writer Jack Kirby, the character first appeared in X-Men #1 (September 1963). Stan Lee writes in the foreword to X-Men: The Ultimate Guide that he made Beast the most articulate, eloquent, and well-read of the X-Men to contrast with his brutish exterior. Further, the book opines that the Werner Roth–Roy Thomas team garnered admiration for their "appealing and sensitive characterizations of the original X-Men". Roth, under the alias Jay Gavin, had taken over for Kirby fully by issue #18, and Thomas was a new talent. Along with the rest of the X-Men, Beast was given an individualized, colorful new costume in issue #39.

According to writer Will Murray, a possible inspiration for the Beast was Andrew Blodgett "Monk" Mayfair, a companion of pulp hero Doc Savage. Both are possessed of an apelike appearance and are brilliant scientists. Before becoming more erudite in later issues, McCoy also used a great deal of slang in his early appearances much like Monk.

=== 1970s, 1980s, and 1990s ===
In Amazing Adventures vol. 2 #11 (March 1972), written by Gerry Conway and drawn by Tom Sutton, Beast underwent a radical change and mutated into his furry, blue (originally grey) appearance. The concept originated with Roy Thomas, an effort to make the character more visibly striking, and Beast also became more werewolf-like to capitalize on the success of Werewolf by Night. Steve Englehart, who wrote the remainder of the Beast's short-lived spotlight in Amazing Adventures, emphasized the character's wit rather than the tragedy of his transformation into a more monstrous form, reasoning that the Beast's intelligence and sense of humor would allow him to see his misfortune in perspective. Over the next decade the Beast would appear on the roster of several teams in titles ranging from The Avengers to The Defenders to X-Factor. It was not until 1991, in X-Factor #70/X-Men #1, that the Beast finally returned to the X-Men.

Englehart later said that he added the Beast to the Avengers roster because he wanted to write the character again and thought his funny, down-to-earth personality would make him a good foil for Moondragon. Succeeding writers of The Avengers similarly found that the character's lightheartedness made a good balance to the team's generally serious tone, resulting in the Beast's run in The Avengers outlasting his earlier run in X-Men. His friendship with fellow Avenger Wonder Man would likewise come to eclipse his friendship with X-Man Iceman for the comics fandom. The Avengers #137 (July 1975) debuted the Beast's catchphrase, "Oh, my stars and garters," and The Avengers #164 (October 1977) was the first to depict him as a sex symbol, a take which writer Jim Shooter said resulted in very positive mail from female readers in particular.

In 1986, Beast re-joined the original X-Men in a new team, X-Factor. In 1991, he re-joined the X-Men along with the rest of the original team.

=== 2000s ===
In X-Treme X-Men #3 (2001) he experienced a further mutation into a feline being, first shown in the introduction to New X-Men (June, 2001), by Frank Quitely and Grant Morrison. As evidenced on the back cover of X-Treme X-Men Chris Claremont, writer of that series in addition to both The Uncanny X-Men (for sixteen consecutive years) and X-Factor, contributed much to the Beast's characterization. Citing Claremont as inspiration for his run on New X-Men, Morrison explains Beast as a "brilliant, witty bipolar scientist". Morrison continues, "I saw Henry McCoy as an incredibly clever, witty, cultured, well-traveled, experienced, well-read character so I brought out those parts of his personality which seemed to me to fit the profiles of the smartest and most worldly people I know—his sense of humor is dark and oblique. He's obviously quite clearly bipolar and swings between manic excitement and ghastly self-doubt. He has no dark secrets, however, and nothing to hide."

Joss Whedon's "Astonishing X-Men: Gifted" story arc featured a "mutant cure" designed by Indian Benetech scientist Dr. Kavita Rao, and the prospect of "real" humanity arouses the interest of a heavily mutated Beast, who visits Rao only to discover that the drug is the product of illegal human experimentation on an unknown victim. The idea of a mutant cure, which had previously appeared in the 1992 animated series, was also the basis of the X-Men: The Last Stand movie plot and the series was even made into a motion comic. IGN called the arc focusing on Beast "best X-Men run in a decade" and lauded Whedon for flawless character dynamics. According to BusinessWeek, Beast is listed as one of the top ten most intelligent fictional characters in American comics.

=== 2010s and 2020s ===
Beast appeared as a regular character throughout the 2010–2013 Secret Avengers series, from issue #1 (July 2010) through its final issue #37 (March 2013).

In the Krakoan Age, Beast becomes the leader of X-Force, which had been repurposed as an intelligence-gathering agency for the mutant nation of Krakoa. Over time, Beast becomes increasingly amoral, culminating in him being killed off and replaced with a younger clone whose memories stop just before the original Beast's downfall. In the storyline "Age of Revelation", Beast is revealed to have survived; having transferred his consciousness into an artificial white-furred body, he intends to continue Krakoa's vision as the founder of the group 3K, forcibly creating new mutants through experimentation. After learning of the mutagenic X-Virus created in the future, Beast recreates it for his use in creating mutants. Separately, Beast's clone joins Cyclops's X-Men team in Alaska.

In X-Men Legends Vol. 2 #1-2 (2022), taking place between The Incredible Hulk #181 - 182 and Giant Size X-Men #1 starring Wolverine, it is revealed that Beast was responsible for the existence of Wolverine's will-be iconic X-Men mask, when Beast was manipulated by Mesmero into his amnesiac masked servant, Wildlife.

== Fictional character biography ==
Henry "Hank" McCoy is the son of Norton McCoy, a nuclear power plant worker whose exposure to radiation caused his son to be born a mutant with unusually large hands and feet. Nicknamed "Beast" by his classmates, Hank's mutant physique made him a star football player, though he grew self-conscious about his proportions and learned to mask his insecurity behind an outsized vocabulary and bookish manner. After a criminal known as the Conquistador abducted his parents to force him into service, the X-Men intervened, and Professor Charles Xavier recruited Hank as a founding member of the team.

As one of the original X-Men alongside Cyclops, Marvel Girl, Iceman, and Angel, Beast was written as sociable and prone to forming close friendships and long romances, including one with Vera Cantor that recurred over the years. After he and Iceman were attacked by an anti-mutant mob, an embittered Beast briefly quit the team and took up professional wrestling before returning to help defeat the man who had beaten him in the ring.

After graduating from Xavier's school, McCoy became a genetic researcher at the Brand Corporation, where he isolated a chemical compound capable of temporarily granting mutant traits. When communist spies infiltrating Brand threatened to expose him as a mutant, he drank the compound to disguise himself; the transformation slowed his perception of time so severely that he missed the window to take an antidote, leaving him with a blue-furred animalistic appearance. He briefly hid his new form behind a mask and gloves before abandoning the disguise and exposing corruption at the Brand Corporation.

Beast joined the Avengers, first as a foil for Moondragon and later as a full member, and briefly worried that his scientific talents were overshadowed by teammate Hank Pym even as he became a sex symbol celebrity. He formed a lasting friendship with fellow Avenger Wonder Man before departing when the team's roster was overhauled, wanting to rediscover his identity beyond the role of team jester.

Beast then joined the Defenders to seek Doctor Strange's help after his girlfriend Vera Cantor fell into a coma from Skrull poisoning, and found the team's looser structure liberating, eventually becoming its leader. He became a public lecturer and activist, founding the mutant rights coalition MONSTER, and was later paired with Dazzler to rescue her from a cult-like mutant organization.

After the Defenders disbanded, Beast reunited with his original teammates Cyclops, Iceman, Angel, and a revived Jean Grey to form X-Factor, a team that publicly posed as mutant hunters while secretly locating and training young mutants, beginning with a fire-generating sailor named Rusty Collins. He was later abducted by former Brand scientist Carl Maddicks, who used a serum to revert him to a more human appearance; his fur-covered form was eventually restored by the mutant Infectia. X-Factor subsequently battled the Alliance of Evil, a group secretly assembled by Apocalypse.

Beast underwent further transformations in the years that followed, including a period of more feral, cat-like mutation, and secluded himself in a laboratory until he found a cure for the Legacy Virus. He later maintained a relationship with S.W.O.R.D. director Abigail Brand, served on Secret Avengers, and took Professor X's seat in the Illuminati, inheriting his Infinity Gem.

Beast helped Professor X found the independent mutant nation of Krakoa and became head of its intelligence agency, X-Force; after the Reavers assassinated Xavier, he led the team that traced the killers to a cell of the anti-mutant group XENO, commanded by a clone of the geneticist Dr. Moreau. The strain of protecting Krakoa pushed Beast toward torture and murder: he enslaved his old ally Wolverine, beheading him and disrupting his resurrection so that he returned as a feral killer under Beast's control, and covered up a botched black-ops mission that killed a US general who was pushing for military action against the island. After Krakoa itself helped the feral Wolverine escape and recover his sanity, Wolverine hunted Beast down and killed him; instantly reborn in a cloned body, Beast fled Krakoa in disgrace and built an army of cloned Beasts and Wolverines to continue enforcing his methods, until Wolverine and his ally Maverick tracked him down and defeated him. At the end of the "Age of Revelation" storyline, it is revealed that the original Beast survived and became the chairman of 3K, an organization intending to give mutant abilities to humans.

== Powers and abilities ==
It is possible that Beast's mutation is a result of genetic atavism. However, he also possesses neotenous characteristics, which may explain him having a genius-level intellect despite his animal physique. He also possesses superhuman strength, speed and agility. He is an excellent hand-to-hand combatant, employing a unique style of acrobatic combat, from combat training he received at Professor Xavier's and coaching from Captain America.

=== Anthropoid/Simian physique ===
Originally, Hank McCoy retains the basic features of a normal human alongside a generally simian physiology (e.g., elongated limbs and enlarged extremities) equivalent to that of a great ape. This mutation gives him superhuman strength, speed, reflexes, agility, flexibility, dexterity, coordination, balance, and endurance. Hank is equally dexterous with all four limbs; able to perform tasks with his feet or hands with equal ease. Because of his talents and training, Beast can outperform any Olympic-level athlete, contorting his body and performing aerial feats gracefully. His strength and dexterity allow him to climb vertical surfaces with just his hands or feet, jump great distances and survive falls that would kill any ordinary person. He also possesses enhanced senses and can track people for great distances over open terrain and his feet are sensitive enough to detect electronic signals (from bombs, listening devices, etc.) through solid walls and floors. Later, he drank an experimental solution of his own making and mutated further through the growth of grey fur covering his entire body and the enhancement of all of his existing abilities, especially his strength, and Hank also gained a nearly instantaneous healing factor. The psychological impact of this first transformation caused Beast to experience short-term amnesia and also made it difficult for him to control his animalistic instincts, which would cause him to slip into an uncontrollable berserker rage during combat. However, his body suddenly mutated again after a short time, changing his fur color from grey to black (although comic book printing technology depicted it as blue), returning his strength to previous levels, and losing his healing factor. He was also able to more easily control his animal instincts after this second mutation. Beast gained the ability to emit mood-altering pheromones, causing sexual attraction in women. Hank McCoy briefly returned to his human form with his hair color now being depicted as black, not reddish brown. During this time he was occasionally depicted with claws and fangs, but these were not a part of his original mutation. However, as a result of being touched by Pestilence his strength began to increase exponentially while his intellect began to decrease.

After Infectia's kiss restored Hank to his simian physique, his intellect had stabilized and returned to his previous genius-level, and his strength had increased to superhuman proportions. Beast's fangs and claws became a consistent part of his appearance after this return to his "blue and furry" form.

Beast would later be stabilized to a more human/ape-like form with pointed ears, fangs, and no hair except for the fur on his head.

=== Feline physique ===
After being critically wounded, Hank's body undergoes a secondary mutation, jump-started by Sage. The result is a more feline appearance equivalent to that of a big cat with a cat-like head and feet. His strength, speed, stamina, sturdiness, and senses increase further with this change. He gains catlike agility, flexibility, coordination, and balance, and all his senses are enhanced to twenty times that of a normal human being. In addition, Beast develops an accelerated healing factor that allows him to repair mild to moderate injuries within the span of a few hours. However, he loses his superhuman dexterity, once admitting that he used to play the guitar, but is now learning to play the drums instead. Following the X-Men's relocation to San Francisco, Beast discovers that he had regained some of his old manual dexterity. In the first issue of Warren Ellis' Astonishing X-Men run, Beast also comments he no longer needs full sleep.

It is later discovered that his secondary feline mutation is still detrimental to his health: as such, with the combined efforts of past versions of Jean Grey and himself, Beast's condition was stabilized in a more human/ape-like form, possessing blue fur and larger than the average human male but otherwise fairly human.

=== Genius-level intellect ===
Hank possesses a brilliant intellect. He is a world-renowned biochemist, having earned PhDs in Biophysics and Genetics, and is the man who cured the Legacy Virus. He frequently functions as both field medic and in-house physician for the X-Men, despite not technically having a medical degree. His intelligence and expertise in genetics rival that of Professor X, Moira MacTaggert, and Kavita Rao. Despite this, he has never received a Nobel Prize or been elected to the United States National Academy of Sciences. A Renaissance man, McCoy is well versed in many fields including linguistics (fluent in English, German, French, Latin, Spanish, Japanese, Arabic, and Russian as well as the fictional language Latverian), literature, philosophy, psychology, sociology, history, art and art history, anthropology, music, political science and economics with a special affinity for science and technology and a penchant for quoting literary classics including Shakespeare's plays. His vast scientific knowledge ranges from theoretical physics, quantum mechanics, differential equations, nanotechnology, anatomy, biomedicine, analytical chemistry, electrical engineering, and mechanical engineering to the construction of a hyper-magnetic device. An electronics expert, he often repairs Cerebro and makes upgrades to the Danger Room settings. He has made several deus ex machina devices on par with Reed Richards, including a device that strips entities of cosmic powers. While not a medical doctor, he was able to perform brain surgery on the Red Skull to extract the fragment of Charles Xavier's brain that the Skull had grafted onto himself, removing the Skull's telepathic abilities while leaving the villain otherwise apparently healthy.

== Other characters named Beast ==
=== Time-displaced Beast ===
Past versions of Beast and the original X-Men are transported to the present day and defect to Cyclops's school, after the events of the Battle of the Atom unfold. Young Hank is later transported to the Ultimate Marvel universe, where he is captured by that world's version of Doctor Doom, then teams up with the Guardians of the Galaxy in finding the Black Vortex.

Following the reconstruction of reality after the Battleworld crisis, the displaced X-Men remain in the future, traveling the world as they try to find their place, while the 'present' Beast works with the Inhumans to find a means of resolving the recent release of Terrigenesis crystals that have proven dangerous to mutants. The younger Beast reveals to his teammates that he has determined, through a combination of science and magic, that the younger X-Men cannot return to the past as they are already there, leaving them free to travel the world and find their own place.

Ultimately this Beast, along with the rest of the displaced X-Men, were returned to the past after an attack by Ahab against the team nearly caused a dangerous temporal paradox. Using the knowledge gained from her future self, Jean wipes the memories of the future from the young X-Men, while also putting those memories on a "time delay" so that they would remember their time in the future only after they caught up with the point in time when they had left.

=== Krakoan duplicate ===
As mentioned above, Wolverine and X-Force discovered that Beast had deleted most of his back-ups from Cerebro so that they could not track him. They were able to compromise by using the latest available back-up, but this version of Hank was dated back to his initial time with the Avengers and thus had no memory of his later actions. Joining forces with his old friend Simon Williams, the young Beast was able to track down his future self, with the older Beast ultimately sacrificing himself to save Simon from a weapon he had created.

After Krakoa leaves Earth for the White Hot Room, the "clone" Beast joined Cyclops' team of X-Men stationed in Alaska in the old Weapon X facility. While this version of Hank had no memory of his future self's actions, he still regretted what he had become and expressed concern about meeting a similar fate, asking others such as Tony Stark how he had been allowed to fall that far.

== Other versions ==
=== Age of Apocalypse ===
The Dark Beast, sometimes known as the Black Beast, is an evil alternative version of Beast from the "Age of Apocalypse" universe.

=== Battle of the Atom ===
In the possible future witnessed in Battle of the Atom, Beast has mutated further, with one side of his head notably more feral than the other, including a horn. He has also defected to the Brotherhood, having apparently become disillusioned with the X-Men's goal while blaming himself for causing some unspecified catastrophe by bringing his past self into the present. Beast later decides to return to the X-Men once it is established that this Brotherhood's leaders - Raze and Charles Xavier II - had brainwashed the rest of the team to join them, with Beast expressing his intent to make up for his actions under their control.

=== Ultimate Marvel ===
In the Ultimate X-Men, Beast was born with hand-like feet. He tried to make a substance that would cure his mutation but instead it only made it worse. With his own parents denouncing him throughout his childhood for his genetic status, he chooses to hide his immense intelligence to avoid further complications. Hank becomes a founding member of the Ultimate X-Men taking the codename Beast. He also takes on the role of the team's elite engineer, frequently upgrading the X-Men's Blackbird X-Jet and Danger Room.

When the team is kidnapped by Weapon X, they operate on Beast, causing him to take on a blue furry appearance and gain additional, strengthened senses, such as smell and hearing. After being killed by Sentinels and resurrected, Beast reverts to his human form, but retains blue hair. Xavier and Nick Fury keep his survival a secret, Xavier making Beast believe he is regularly visiting his family and the X-Men to keep him occupied. After being proved to be the real Beast by Psylocke and Wolverine, he is allowed to join Bishop's new X-Men.

In Issue #1 of Ultimatum, Beast, among Dazzler, Angel and Nightcrawler are overwhelmed in Magneto's flooding of New York (via Thor's hammer). Angel survives the flood and recovers the bodies of Dazzler and Beast, who drowned.

== In other media ==
=== Television ===
- Beast, based on his original comics design, appears in "The Sub-Mariner" segment of The Marvel Super Heroes. This version is a member of the Allies for Peace.
- Beast in his original design makes a non-speaking appearance in a flashback in the Spider-Man and His Amazing Friends episode "The Origin of Iceman".
- Beast, sporting his blue simian form, appears in X-Men: The Animated Series, voiced by George Buza.
  - Beast appears in X-Men '97, voiced again by George Buza.
- Beast, sporting his blue simian form, appears in Spider-Man: The Animated Series, voiced again by George Buza. Throughout his appearances, he is revealed to have previously worked with Herbert Landon.
- Beast appears in X-Men: Evolution, voiced by Michael Kopsa. This version is initially a chemistry and gym teacher at Bayville High School, using a serum he developed to suppress his mutation. As the serum's effects weaken, he grows increasingly aggressive and eventually mutates into his blue Beast form which is more ape-like. After receiving help from Charles Xavier and Spyke, he regains his mind and joins the X-Men as a mentor.
- Beast, sporting his blue simian form, appears in Wolverine and the X-Men, voiced by Fred Tatasciore. Beast remains at the X-Mansion's ruins following its destruction, Charles Xavier and Jean Grey's mysterious disappearances and the X-Men's subsequent disbandment. As a result, he goes on to become one of the first X-Men that Wolverine re-recruits after Xavier tasks him with stopping Master Mold.
- Beast, sporting his blue feline form, appears in Marvel Anime: X-Men, voiced by Hideyuki Tanaka in the Japanese version and again by Fred Tatasciore in the English dub.
- Beast appears in the Marvel Disk Wars: The Avengers episode "The Mightiest of Heroes!", voiced by Naomi Kusumi in the Japanese version and Dave Wittenberg in the English version. This version has a lion-like head and an ape-like body.

=== Film ===
- Beast appears in early drafts for X-Men (2000), but had to be removed for the film to be greenlit by the studio due to budget concerns. Nonetheless, elements of his character, including his medical expertise and political activism, were adapted into that of Jean Grey's.
- Dr. Hank McCoy makes a cameo appearance in X2, portrayed by Steve Bacic.
- Beast appears in X-Men: The Last Stand, portrayed by Kelsey Grammer. This version is an associate of the X-Men, alumnus of Xavier's School for Gifted Youngsters, and member of the U.S. Cabinet who serves as Secretary of Mutant Affairs. After learning of a "mutant cure" being developed and the Brotherhood of Mutants responding violently against it, Beast resigns from his position to help the X-Men defend the cure's production facility on Alcatraz Island, with the former using the cure on the Brotherhood's leader, Magneto. Following the battle, Beast is appointed United States Ambassador to the United Nations.
- A young Hank McCoy appears in X-Men: First Class, portrayed by Nicholas Hoult. Actor Benjamin Walker was originally cast in the role, but dropped out of the film to star in the Broadway musical Bloody Bloody Andrew Jackson. This version initially works for the CIA's Division X and originally possesses prehensile feet and enhanced speed, agility, and reflexes. After being recruited into Charles Xavier's fledgling X-Men and falling in love with teammate Mystique, McCoy develops a serum derived from her DNA in an attempt to cure himself, only to turn himself into a blue-furred, feline form. After receiving the name "Beast" from teammate Havok, McCoy serves as the X-Men's pilot during their mission to foil the Hellfire Club's plot to start World War III.
- Two incarnations of Hank McCoy appear in X-Men: Days of Future Past, portrayed again by Nicholas Hoult and Kelsey Grammer. Hoult's incarnation temporarily uses a serum to suppress his mutation until he and Xavier are recruited by the latter's future self and Wolverine to help avert a Sentinel-controlled future while Grammer's incarnation makes a cameo appearance in the new peaceful timeline. Additionally, a viral marketing website for the film reveals Beast was killed in 2015 by an angry mob of human protesters outside his home in upstate New York before Wolverine changed the timeline.
- Hank McCoy appears in X-Men: Apocalypse, portrayed again by Nicholas Hoult. As of this film, he has returned to using his suppression serum while developing a new jet in the X-Mansion's basement before he re-reverts to his Beast form to help the X-Men fight Apocalypse and his Horsemen.
- Hank McCoy makes a cameo appearance in Deadpool 2, portrayed again by Nicholas Hoult.
- Hank McCoy appears in Dark Phoenix, portrayed again by Nicholas Hoult. After his teammate Jean Grey's powers escalate to uncontrollable levels, leading to her accidentally killing Mystique, an incensed McCoy turns to Magneto for help in killing Grey. When the D'Bari attacks Earth for her powers, McCoy and Magneto join forces with the X-Men to repel the aliens. Following this, Xavier leaves McCoy in charge of Xavier's School for Gifted Youngsters while he takes a leave of absence.
- Beast was meant to appear in a self-titled spin-off film, which was in development and would have seen Nicholas Hoult reprise the role once more before it was canceled.
- An alternate universe variant of Hank McCoy / Beast makes a cameo appearance in the mid-credits scene of The Marvels (2023), portrayed again by Kelsey Grammer. This version works with Maria Rambeau / Binary to investigate incursions, which they theorize are caused by individuals from adjacent realities.
- Hank McCoy / Beast will appear in Avengers: Doomsday (2026), portrayed again by Kelsey Grammer.

=== Video games ===
- Beast appears as a playable character in X-Men: Mutant Apocalypse.
- Beast appears as a playable character in X-Men 2: Clone Wars.
- Beast makes a cameo appearance in Chun-Li's ending in X-Men vs. Street Fighter.
- Beast makes a cameo appearance in Marvel Super Heroes vs. Street Fighter via the Death Valley stage.
- Beast appears as a playable character in X-Men: Mutant Academy.
- Beast appears as a playable character in X-Men: Mutant Academy 2.
- Beast appears as an NPC in Spider-Man 2: Enter Electro, voiced by Dee Bradley Baker.
- Beast appears as a playable character in X-Men: Next Dimension.
- Beast appears as an NPC in X2: Wolverine's Revenge, voiced by Richard Portnow.
- Beast appears as a playable character in X-Men Legends, voiced by Richard Doyle.
- Beast appears as an NPC in X-Men Legends II: Rise of Apocalypse, voiced again by Richard Doyle. After being captured by Apocalypse and Mister Sinister at the X-Mansion, he is brainwashed into becoming Dark Beast. He becomes a boss alongside Mister Sinister in Egypt before being freed by the X-Men.
- Beast appears in X-Men: The Official Game, voiced by Gregg Berger.
- Beast appears as a playable character in Marvel Super Hero Squad Online.
- Beast appears as a playable character in Marvel Avengers Alliance. He is captured and brainwashed by Mister Sister to serve as a member of Apocalypse's Horsemen, Pestilence, until they are defeated and returned to normal.
- Beast appears as a playable character in Lego Marvel Super Heroes, voiced again by Fred Tatasciore.
- Beast appears as an NPC, later playable character, in Marvel Heroes, voiced again by Fred Tatasciore.
- Beast appears as a playable character in Marvel Contest of Champions.
- Beast appears as a playable character in Marvel: Future Fight.
- Beast appears as a playable character in Marvel Puzzle Quest.
- Beast appears as an NPC in Marvel Ultimate Alliance 3: The Black Order, voiced again by Fred Tatasciore.
- Beast appears as a playable character in Marvel Super War.

=== Merchandise ===
- Beast received an action figure in Toy Biz's X-Men Classics line.
- Beast received an action figure in Toy Biz, later Hasbro's, Marvel Legends line.
- Beast received an action figure in the Marvel Icons line.
- Beast received a figure in the Classic Marvel Figurine Collection.
- Beast received a figure in Hasbro's Marvel Universe Infinite Series line.
- Beast appears as a minifigure as part of the Marvel Series 2 line of Lego Minifigures.

=== Miscellaneous ===
- Beast appears in the Astonishing X-Men motion comic, initially voiced by Mike Pollock and later by Ron Halder.
- Beast appears in the Marvel magazine, Marvel Vision. For most of the series, he is credited as the author of the Beast Files before Red Giant Entertainment founder Benny Powell was revealed to be the true author.

== Reception ==
Beast has received positive reception as a comic book character and a member of the X-Men. Wizard magazine ranked Beast the 180th-greatest comic book character of all time, on their list of the Top 200 Comic Book Characters of All Time.

IGN has ranked Beast multiple times:

- In 2006, they ranked Beast as the 9th-greatest X-Men member:
  He is, ironically, one of the most human of the X-Man, taking the opinions of others to heart. He shuts himself out from the world, often even from his teammates, to work in the lab and avoid the possibility of rejection for his looks. When the world can accept Henry McCoy, the X-Men will have succeeded in their mission.
- In 2011, they ranked him the 58th-greatest comic book hero of all time, stating that "Beast embodies everything about the mutant struggle in the Marvel Universe."
- As #7 in their list of "The Top 50 Avengers" in 2012.

In 2014, Entertainment Weekly ranked Beast 7th in their "Let's rank every X-Man ever" list.
