= Snake Woman =

Snake Woman may refer to:

- Snake Woman, sister of Chief Niwot and mother of Margaret Poisal
- Cihuacoatl, literally "Snake Woman", an Aztec goddess

== Film and literature ==
- A snake-woman hybrid in mythology or fiction; see List of reptilian humanoids
- Snake Woman (comics), a Virgin Comics comic book title and character
- The Snake Woman, a 1961 British horror film
- Snakewoman, a 2005 film directed by Jesús Franco
- Hebi Onna ("Snake Woman"), manga series by Kazuo Umezu published in English as Reptilia

== See also ==
- Snake man (disambiguation)
- Ichchadhari naagin, shapeshifting snakes in Indian folklore
