= Battle of the Atom =

Marvel Comics storyline

- Cover of Battle of the Atom 1 (September 2013), art by Arthur Adams
- Publisher: Marvel Comics
- Publication date: September – October 2013
- Genre: Superhero
- Main character(s): Past X-Men; Wolverine's Present X-Men; Cyclops's Present X-Men; Future X-Men

Creative team
- Writer(s): Brian Michael Bendis; Jason Aaron; Brian Wood
- Artist(s): Frank Cho; Stuart Immonen; Chris Bachalo; David Lopez; Giuseppe Camuncoli

"Battle of the Atom" is a 10-part comic book crossover storyline published by Marvel Comics that debuted in September and October 2013 and ran through multiple X-Men books.

The story involves the X-Men of the future traveling to present time in order to force the time-displaced X-Men to return to their rightful time, as their presence in the current timeline will result in disastrous consequences.

== Publication history ==
Battle of the Atom was announced in April 2013. The story involves the X-Men of the future traveling to present time in order to force the All-New X-Men to return to their rightful time, as their presence in the current timeline will result in disastrous consequences.

Brian Michael Bendis, writer of All-New X-Men, stated that the use of time travel in the story is less important than the theme of characters exploring how the choices they make early in life affect them later on in life, in a manner similar to the 1986 feature film Peggy Sue Got Married. Musing on the nature of fate, and how these ideas inspired both his previous comics work, and "Battle of the Atom" in particular, Bendis explained:

I get a lot of questions about this: Where would you see yourself in 10 years or what do you think the 12-year-old version of you would think of this? It seems to be on a lot of people's minds. When the X-Men are faced with all of this, you can't help but second-guess or really take hold of the choices you're making in life, and some people don't. They don't really think about the choices they're making, or you see someone in a relationship with someone and you go, 'Really, that's what you want in your life?' The X-Men can really show that to people in examining your future and such. It's about your own legacy and being the best version of yourself, and if I go down this road, will I be the best version of myself or will I derail completely? I've been writing about that since Jinx. Literally, Jinx says, 'I'm on a road and I have no idea how I got here and I don't even know where the road I was supposed to be on is. I can't even see it.' When I was in college, I saw people not even sure why they were in the major they were in. I'll never forget, one of my neighbors was an astrophysicist, and he was sitting on the porch and he goes, "I hate astrophysics. Why am I doing this? I don't like it." And he was only a year away from graduating. The guy's haunted me all these years.

== Plot ==
When Kitty Pryde’s group of time displaced Original Five (O5) X-Men and Cyclops' Uncanny X-Men are forced to team up to stop an out of control new mutant, young Cyclops is killed by a Sentinel. He is resurrected moments later by one of Cyclops' recruits, who is a healer. However, in the brief moments that Young Cyclops was dead, the adult Cyclops blinked out of existence and the world around the two groups suddenly began to shudder and shake, as if reality was collapsing from the time paradox.

This causes another round of debate from Wolverine's X-Men about returning the O5 to their proper place in the timeline. The debate is suddenly interrupted by the arrival of a group of older X-Men led by an aged Kitty Pryde, the grandson of Charles Xavier, and an adult Jean Grey (the time displaced O5 Jean Grey, having never returned to the past), dressed as the new Xorn. They seek to force the X-Men to go back to the past.

Realizing that something does not seem right, O5 Jean escapes with O5 Cyclops. The X-Men and "Future X-Men" pursue, with Xorn ambiguously explaining that a catastrophe will soon befall the X-Men if the O5 do not return to their original place in the timeline.

O5 Jean and Cyclops make contact with the modern-day Cyclops' team of Uncanny X-Men, and after some consideration he agrees to help his younger self and young Jean. Realizing that Cyclops's thinking on the matter is compromised, Emma Frost telepathically alerts the X-Men and Future X-Men of Young Jean's and Cyclops's location. However, upon seeing Xorn attack her younger self, Frost has a change of heart and attacks Xorn with the Stepford Cuckoos and O5 Jean.

Xorn is able to defeat the combined powers of Frost and the Cuckoos, but O5 Jean is eventually able to defeat her. Xorn gives O5 Jean a glimpse of the future, a ploy on her part, which convinces O5 Jean that they need to go back to their proper place in the timeline. The three teams of X-Men part ways, with Cyclops unsure if this fight is really over.

Magik, who is also suspicious of the motives of these new X-Men, travels to the future along with O5 Beast and O5 Iceman. It is discovered that these "Future X-Men" are in truth the "Future Brotherhood", their motives purely self-serving. This new Brotherhood was created after Alison Blaire was elected president and assassinated soon afterward. The true "Future X-Men" agree to travel back in time and confront the Brotherhood.

Upon arriving at the X-Mansion with O5 Jean, Cyclops and Angel, it is discovered that the O5 Beast and Iceman are in the future. The Brotherhood realizes that they will soon have to fight Cyclops's team and the true "Future X-Men", and accelerate their plans. It is revealed that the "Future Kitty Pryde" is really Raze, the son of Mystique and Wolverine. They attack the original X-Men, including an incapacitated Wolverine. Raze is able to infiltrate Cyclops's team and capture O5 Iceman and Beast.

The O5 X-Men are brought to Beast's time machine and an attempt is made to send them back in time. However, an unknown force prevents this process from being completed. As the other Brotherhood members are overwhelmed by the Uncanny X-Men and the Future X-Men, the surviving Brotherhood members flee to Cape Citadel, the site of the first battle between the O5 X-Men and Magneto.

The Brotherhood attacks the military to attract the attention of S.H.I.E.L.D. The fully united force of the Uncanny X-Men, Wolverine's team of X-Men, and the "Future" X-Men arrive to stop them. Xorn controls the S.H.I.E.L.D. weapon systems on site and launches the government Sentinels, which were being created in secret. The X-Men defeat the government Sentinels, and turn their attention to Xorn. She is able to hold the combined forces off, but her powers overload and she explodes.

The exact catastrophe that befalls the X-Men due to the O5's presence is not revealed. The Future X-Men return to their proper place in the timeline with their casualties. The whereabouts of the Brotherhood member Raze is unknown. The O5 X-Men, due to being nearly forced to go back in time, decide to leave the Jean Grey School and join the Uncanny X-Men. Kitty Pryde, disgusted that the modern X-Men tried to send the original five back by force, even hunting Cyclops and Jean down like criminals, quits and joins the O5 Team to continue to mentor them.

== Titles involved ==
September 2013

- Part 1: X-Men: Battle of the Atom #1
- Part 2: All-New X-Men #16
- Part 3: X-Men (vol. 4) #5
- Part 4: Uncanny X-Men (vol. 3) #12
- Part 5: Wolverine and the X-Men #36

October 2013

- Part 6: All-New X-Men #17
- Part 7: X-Men (vol. 4) #6
- Part 8: Uncanny X-Men (vol. 3) #13
- Part 9: Wolverine and the X-Men #37
- Part 10: X-Men: Battle of the Atom #2

== Critical reception ==
"Battle of the Atom" has been reviewed by a number of different websites, including IGN, iFanboy and Comic Book Resources.

== Mobile game ==
In January 2014, a mobile card game based on the event was released for iOS and Android devices.

== Collected editions ==
Title	Material collected	Pages	Publication date	ISBN
X-Men: Battle of the Atom	X-Men: Battle of the Atom (vol. 1) #1-2; All-New X-Men (vol. 1) 16-17; X-Men (vol. 4) #5-6; Uncanny X-Men (vol. 3) #12-13; Wolverine and the X-Men (vol. 1) #36-37	248	January 21, 2014	Hardcover: 978-0785189060 Paperback: 978-1846535727
