= The Snake Man =

- Short story by Pu Songling
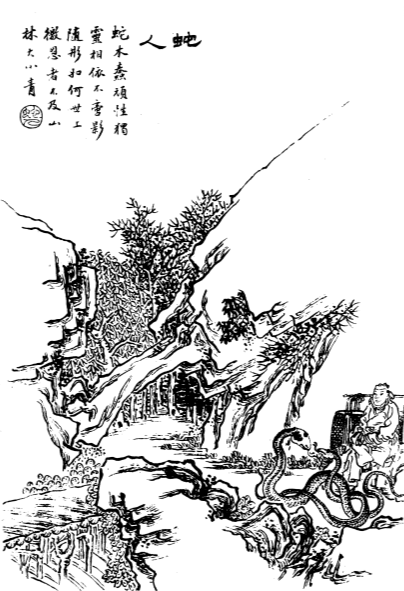
- 19th-century illustration from Xiangzhu liaozhai zhiyi tuyong (Liaozhai with commentary and illustrations; 1886)
- Original title: 蛇人 (Sheren)
- Translator: Sidney L. Sondergard
- Country: China
- Language: Chinese
- Genres: Zhiguai; Chuanqi; Short story

Publication
- Published in: Strange Stories from a Chinese Studio
- Publication type: Anthology
- Publication date: c. 1740
- Published in English: 2008

Chronology
Changqing Monk (长清僧)	Chopping the Python (斫蟒)

"The Snake Man" (Chinese: 蛇人; pinyin: Shérén) is a short story by Pu Songling first published in Strange Tales from a Chinese Studio which revolves around the titular snake-keeper and his snakes.

== Plot ==
In Dong Commandery, a man raises two green snakes – "Big Green" (大青) and "Green the Second" (二青) – to perform for a living. The snake man prefers Green the Second, who is described as having a "red-spotted forehead" and an ability to "invariably wind and sway" per his commands. Big Green dies a year later; adding to the snake man's plight, Green the Second goes missing shortly after, driving him near-suicidal. However, he quickly finds his snake, now accompanied by another one who the snake man names "Little Green" (小青).

A few years later, Green the Second has become too big for the snake man to handle, thus he decides to release him into the wilderness at the East Mountain in Zichuan; Little Green stays on with the snake man and slowly grows to Green the Second's size too. Another few years thereafter, the snake man returns to the mountain, whereupon he is attacked by Green the Second. Recognising his former master, Green the Second knocks itself against his wooden basket in which Little Green is. The snake man announces that he will allow Little Green to leave with Green the Second; both snakes slither off, "crestfallen", to an unknown fate.

In his postscript, Pu comments that duplicitous persons should "feel themselves shamed by these two snakes".

== Background ==
Originally titled "Sheren" (蛇人), "The Snake Man" is believed to be one of the earlier entries that Pu wrote for his anthology that was published in around 1740; it was fully translated into English by the first volume of Sidney L. Sondergard's Strange Tales from a Chinese Studio published in 2008. As Allan Barr opines in his Comparative Studies of Early and Late Tales in Liaozhai Zhiyi (1985), "The Snake Man" is a reflection "on the ironic discrepancy between the modesty of the snakes in the story and the spiteful pride of man".
