= Adam Bobrow =

American sports commentator

Personal information
- Full name: Adam Michael Bobrow
- Born: February 14, 1981 (age 45) Woodland Hills, Los Angeles, California
- Education: University of Southern California (BA)
- Occupations: Youtuber, voice actor, actor, sports commentator, athlete

Sport
- Sport: Table tennis

YouTube information
- Channel: Adam Bobrow
- Years active: 2006–present
- Subscribers: 1.44 million
- Views: 468.6 million
- Last updated: 01 April 2026

Adam Bobrow (born February 14, 1981), also known as Snakeman and The Voice of Table Tennis, is an American sports commentator, YouTuber, actor, and table tennis player. He operates a YouTube channel dedicated to table tennis enthusiasts and fans, providing them with content to promote the sport. Bobrow's YouTube channel features him challenging individuals to friendly matches, supporting young athletes, and traveling to different countries to interact and play with locals while serving as an ambassador for the sport.

== Early life ==
Bobrow was born in the United States, and grew up near Los Angeles. He has lived in Taiwan since 2016. He grew up playing table tennis with his father. He learned to spin the ball and perform various trick shots including his signature shot and the source of his nickname, the snake. By 15, he was on a local team and began winning tournaments throughout the United States. He played in college at the University of Southern California, where he earned a BA in Theater. After college he taught table tennis at SPiN while auditioning for acting roles.

== Table tennis commentator ==
In 2014, Bobrow won a competition to become the "voice of table tennis", and has been the official commentator for the International Table Tennis Federation ever since. He comments for the main matches in World Table Tennis, along with Fraser Riley. He travels with the tour full time, and believes himself to be the only full-time table tennis commentator in the world.

Bobrow's commentary is known for its excited style, his deep knowledge of the sport, and his emphasis on the positive aspects of the play. He is also known for his flamboyant style of dress. He has been criticized for focusing on the excitement of the game rather than on critical analysis. However, Bobrow's style is credited with bringing the sport to new fans who otherwise would not watch table tennis.

== Acting career ==
As an actor, he has had voice roles in TV shows and video games including Scooby-Doo! Who's Watching Who?. He also had a role in the table tennis movie Balls of Fury.
