= Marvel Super War =

2019 video game

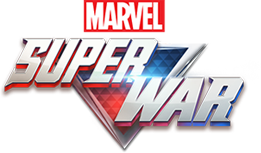
- Developer: NetEase Games
- Publisher: NetEase Games
- Platforms: Android, iOS
- Release: IND/HK/MAC/TW/SEA: December 19, 2019; JP/KOR/AU: August 27, 2020
- Genre: Multiplayer online battle arena
- Mode: Multiplayer

Marvel Super War was a 2019 multiplayer online battle arena game developed and published by NetEase Games for Android and iOS. It was first released on December 19, 2019, until its servers were shut down on June 18, 2024.

== Gameplay ==
Marvel Super War is a multiplayer online battle arena (MOBA) game in which two opposing teams, each consisting of five players, compete to destroy the opposing base. It features over 55 characters composed of heroes and villains from the Marvel Comics universe. Later updates added more characters like Luna Snow, Taskmaster, and Magik. The characters are divided into six different classes: Fighter, Energy, Marksman, Assassin, Tank, and Support. The game does not limit the number of skills a character can have.

The main arena, which is set in Wakanda, is divided into three lanes, with jungles in between them, that are being defended by towers and minions.

== Development ==
In November 2012, a MOBA game based on the Marvel Comics characters was reported to be in development at Smilegate after a contract signing between the company and Disney Interactive. It was rumored to be released in 2014, targeting Asian markets. On May 28, 2019, NetEase Games and Marvel Entertainment announced the Marvel's first MOBA game for Android and iOS, titled Marvel Super War. It was promoted at E3 2016. Netease launched a closed beta testing in India, Indonesia, Malaysia, the Philippines, and Thailand. The second beta testing began in those countries and Singapore on November 21, 2019.

The game was officially released in the aforementioned countries, as well as in Hong Kong, Macau, and Taiwan, on December 19, 2019. It was later released in Japan, South Korea, Australia, and New Zealand on August 27, 2020. Marvel Super War ended its service on June 18, 2024.

== Reception ==
Dale Bashir of IGN Southeast Asia, who played the game at the Thailand Game Show 2019, found Marvel Super War to be "a great way to learn the basics of MOBAs with your favourite Marvel superheroes." Bashir felt that the game was more accessible than the other MOBA games such as Mobile Legends: Bang Bang and League of Legends: Wild Rift, citing the ability to easily earn more kills than those games. Josh Ye of South China Morning Post praised the game for its graphics and character designs. Ye found the roles and powers of the characters were connected to their comic counterparts, making the gameplay "a very immersive experience." Despite feeling the game was "another reskin of a typical MOBA game", he lauded Marvel Super War for "applying the MOBA formula to the Marvel Universe" with superheroes as playable characters.

In September 2020, Marvel Super War was added among the Chinese-made apps that were banned in India, with the Ministry of Electronics and Information Technology stating that they were "engaged in activities which [are] prejudicial to sovereignty and integrity of India, defence of India, security of state, and public order."
