= List of X-Men film series characters =

List of characters appearing in the X-Men film series

X-Men is an American superhero film series based on the X-Men comic book franchise published by Marvel Comics. The series began with the release of the first X-Men movie in 2000. This film was followed by X2 (2003) and X-Men: The Last Stand (2006), forming the original trilogy. A prequel trilogy would begin with X-Men: First Class (2011), featuring a young Magneto, Professor X, and Mystique. The 2014 X-Men: Days of Future Past acted as a sequel to both X-Men: First Class and the original trilogy, taking place in both time periods, altering the timeline and erasing the original trilogy's events. X-Men: Apocalypse (2016) and Dark Phoenix (2019) take place in the revised timeline and finish the prequel trilogy.

The franchise also spawned a solo Wolverine trilogy—X-Men Origins: Wolverine (2009), The Wolverine (2013) and Logan (2017)—and a Deadpool film trilogy. The third film in the Deadpool trilogy, Deadpool & Wolverine (2022), takes place within the Marvel Cinematic Universe, and features elements from both the Fox X-Men and MCU universes. The New Mutants (2020) was a standalone horror film in the X-Men universe. Two television series were created for the franchise, Legion and The Gifted (both 2017–2019).

Characters from the Fox X-Men universe have appeared within the MCU, with Professor X appearing in Doctor Strange in the Multiverse of Madness (2022), Beast in The Marvels (2023), and multiple characters set to appear in the upcoming Avengers: Doomsday.

== Cast overview ==
=== Original timeline (2000–2014) ===
List indicators

This section includes characters who have appeared in the films.

- An empty grey cell indicates the character was not in the film.
- ^{A} indicates an appearance through archival footage or audio.
- ^{C} indicates a cameo role.
- ^{O} indicates an older version of the character.
- ^{P} indicates an appearance in onscreen photographs.
- ^{U} indicates an uncredited appearance.
- ^{V} indicates a voice-only role.
- ^{Y} indicates a younger version of the character.

Characters	Original timeline						
Characters	X-Men	X2	X-Men: The Last Stand	X-Men Origins: Wolverine	X-Men: First Class	The Wolverine	X-Men: Days of Future Past
Characters	2000	2003	2006	2009	2011	2013	2014
James "Jimmy" Howlett / Logan / Wolverine	Hugh Jackman	Hugh Jackman	Hugh Jackman	Hugh Jackman Troye Sivan^{Y}	Hugh Jackman^{C}	Hugh Jackman	Hugh Jackman
Charles Xavier / Professor X	Patrick Stewart	Patrick Stewart	Patrick Stewart	Patrick Stewart^{C}	James McAvoy Laurence Belcher^{Y}	Patrick Stewart^{C}	Patrick Stewart James McAvoy^{Y}
Erik Lehnsherr / Magneto	Ian McKellen Brett Morris^{Y}	Ian McKellen	Ian McKellen		Michael Fassbender Bill Milner^{Y}	Ian McKellen^{C}	Ian McKellen Michael Fassbender^{Y}
Raven Darkholme / Mystique	Rebecca Romijn	Rebecca Romijn	Rebecca Romijn		Jennifer Lawrence Morgan Lily^{Y}		Jennifer Lawrence
Jean Grey / Phoenix	Famke Janssen	Famke Janssen	Famke Janssen Haley Ramm^{Y}			Famke Janssen^{C}	Famke Janssen^{C}
Scott Summers / Cyclops	James Marsden	James Marsden	James Marsden	Tim Pocock^{Y}			James Marsden^{C}
Ororo Munroe / Storm	Halle Berry	Halle Berry	Halle Berry				Halle Berry
Marie D'Ancanto / Rogue	Anna Paquin	Anna Paquin	Anna Paquin				Anna Paquin (Rogue Cut only)
Mortimer Toynbee / Toad	Ray Park	Mentioned		Uncredited actor^{Y}^{C}			Evan Jonigkeit^{Y}^{C}
Victor Creed / Sabretooth	Tyler Mane	Mentioned		Liev Schreiber Michael James Olsen^{Y}			
Senator Robert Kelly	Bruce Davison	Bruce Davison^{C}					
Robert "Bobby" Drake / Iceman	Shawn Ashmore^{C}	Shawn Ashmore	Shawn Ashmore				Shawn Ashmore
John Allerdyce / Pyro	Alexander Burton^{C}	Aaron Stanford	Aaron Stanford				Mentioned
Peter Rasputin / Colossus	Donald MacKinnon^{C}	Daniel Cudmore	Daniel Cudmore				Daniel Cudmore
Jubilation Lee / Jubilee	Katrina Florece^{C}	Kea Wong^{C}	Kea Wong^{C}				Uncredited actress
Kitty Pryde	Sumela Kay^{C}	Katie Stuart^{C}	Ellen Page				Ellen Page
Edie Lensherr	Rhona Shekter				Eva Magyar		
Jakob Lensherr	Kenneth McGregor				George Nikoloff		
Owen D'Ancanto	John E. Nelles						
Priscilla D'Ancanto	Donna Goodhand						
Kurt Wagner / Nightcrawler		Alan Cumming					
Major William Stryker		Brian Cox Brad Loree^{Y}^{U}^{C}		Danny Huston^{Y}			Josh Helman^{Y} Brian Cox^{A}^{C}
Yuriko Oyama / Lady Deathstrike		Kelly Hu					
William and Madeline Drake		Alf Humphreys (William) Jill Teed (Madeline)					
Ronny Drake		Brian Kirk					
Jason Stryker / Jason 143		Michael Reid MacKay		Uncredited actor^{Y}			Mentioned
US President McKenna		Cotter Smith					
Mitchell Laurio		Ty Olsson					
Dr. Henry "Hank" McCoy / Beast		Steve Bacic^{C}^{U}	Kelsey Grammer		Nicholas Hoult^{Y}		Nicholas Hoult^{Y} Kelsey Grammer^{O}^{C}
Theresa Cassidy / Siryn		Shauna Kain	Shauna Kain				
Arthur "Artie" Maddicks		Bryce Hodgson	Bryce Hodgson				
Christoph Nord / Agent Zero		Mentioned		Daniel Henney			
Bolivar Trask		Mentioned				Mentioned	Peter Dinklage
Remy LeBeau / Gambit		Mentioned		Taylor Kitsch			
Douglas Ramsey / Cypher		Layke Anderson					
Danielle "Dani" Moonstar		Uncredited actress					
Dr. Cecilia Reyes		Mentioned					
Vanessa Carlyle / Cocpycat		Mentioned					
Illyana Rasputin / Magik		Mentioned					
Rahne Sinclair / Wolfsbane		Mentioned					
Wade Wilson / Deadpool		Mentioned		Ryan Reynolds Scott Adkins^{U}^{S}			
Peter Maximoff		Mentioned		Uncredited actor			Evan Peters
Wanda Maximoff		Mentioned					Mentioned
Samuel "Sam" Guthrie		Mentioned					
Elizabeth "Betsy" Braddock / Psylocke		Mentioned	Meiling Melancon				
Black Tom Cassidy		Mentioned					
Sean Cassidy / Banshee		Mentioned			Caleb Landry Jones		Mentioned
Roberto "Bobby" Da Costa / Sunspot		Mentioned					Adan Canto
Frederick "Fred" Dukes / The Blob		Mentioned		Kevin Durand			
Kenuicho / Ichiro Harada / Silver Samurai		Mentioned				Hal Yamanouchi Ken Yamamura^{Y}	
James "Jamie" Madrox / Multiple Man		Mentioned	Eric Dane				
Cain Marko / Juggernaut			Vinnie Jones				
Callisto			Dania Ramirez				
Dr. Kavita Rao			Shohreh Aghdashloo				
President of the United States			Josef Sommer				
Trask			Bill Duke				
Warren Worthington III / Angel			Ben Foster Cayden Boyd^{Y}				
Warren Worthington II			Michael Murphy				
Arclight			Omahyra				
Kid Omega			Ken Leung				
Jimmy / Leech			Cameron Bright				
Spike			Lance Gibson				
Robert "Glob" Herman			Clayton Watmough				
John and Elaine Grey			Adrian Hough and Desiree Zukowski				
Anole]			Lloyd Adams				
Moira MacTaggert			Olivia Williams		Rose Byrne^{Y}		
Kayla Silverfox				Lynn Collins		Lynn Collins^{C}^{U}^{A}	
John Wraith / Kestrel				will.i.am			
Christopher Bradley / Bolt				Dominic Monaghan			
Travis and Heather Hudson				Max Cullen and Julia Blake			
Dr. Carol Frost				Asher Keddie			
Thomas Logan				Aaron Jeffery			
John Howlett				Peter O'Brien			
Elizabeth Howlett				Alice Parkinson			
Emma Silverfox				Tahyna Tozzi			
Sebastian Shaw					Kevin Bacon		
Man in Black Suit					Oliver Platt		
Janos Quested / Riptide					Alex Gonzalez		
Azazel					Jason Flemyng		Jason Flemyng^{P}
Angel Salvadore					Zoe Kravitz		Zoe Kravitz^{P}
Emma Frost					January Jones		Mentioned
Armando Munoz / Darwin					Edi Gathegi		
Alexander "Alex" Summers / Havok					Lucas Till		Lucas Till^{C}
Colonel Hendry					Glenn Morshower		
Director John McCone					Matt Craven		
Russian Soviet General					Rade Serbedzija		
Swiss Bank Manager					James Faulkner		
Pig Farmer and Tailor					Ludger Pistor (Pig Farmer) Wilfried Hochholdinger (Tailor)		
Dr. Leigh					Gregory Cox		
William Stryker Sr.					Don Creech		
Amy					Annabelle Wallis		
Sharon Xavier					Beth Goddard		
Mariko Yashida						Tao Okamoto	
Yukio						Rila Fukushima	
Dr. Green / Viper						Svetlana Khodchenkova	
Harada						Will Yun Lee	
Shingen Yashida						Hiroyuki Sanada	
Noburo Mori						Brian Tee	
Lucas Bishop							Omar Sy
Clarice Ferguson / Blink							Fan Bingbing
James Proudstar / Warpath							Booboo Stewart
Senator Brickman							Michael Lerner
US President Richard Nixon							Mark Camacho
Eric Gitter / Ink							Gregg Lowe
Daniels							Jaa Smith-Johnson
Mrs. Maximoff							Zehra Leverman

=== Revised timeline (2014–2024) ===
List indicators

This section includes characters who have appeared in the films.

- An empty grey cell indicates the character was not in the film.
- ^{A} indicates an appearance through archival footage or audio.
- ^{C} indicates a cameo role.
- ^{O} indicates an older version of the character.
- ^{P} indicates an appearance in onscreen photographs.
- ^{U} indicates an uncredited appearance.
- ^{V} indicates a voice-only role.
- ^{Y} indicates a younger version of the character.

Characters	Revised timeline								
Characters	X-Men: First Class	X-Men: Days of Future Past	X-Men: Apocalypse	Deadpool	Logan	Deadpool 2	Dark Phoenix	The New Mutants	Deadpool & Wolverine
Characters	2011	2014	2016	2016	2017	2018	2019	2020	2024
Charles Xavier / Professor X	James McAvoy Laurence Belcher^{Y}	Patrick Stewart^{O} James McAvoy^{Y}	James McAvoy	Mentioned	Patrick Stewart	James McAvoy^{C}^{U}^{A}	James McAvoy		Mentioned
James "Jimmy" Howlett / Logan/Weapon X / Wolverine	Hugh Jackman^{C}^{U}	Hugh Jackman	Hugh Jackman^{C}^{U}	Mentioned	Hugh Jackman	Hugh Jackman^{C}^{U}^{A}			Hugh Jackman
Erik Lehnsherr / Magneto	Michael Fassbender Bill Milner^{Y}	Ian McKellen^{O} Michael Fassbender^{Y}	Michael Fassbender				Michael Fassbender		
Raven Darkholme / Mystique	Jennifer Lawrence Morgan Lily	Jennifer Lawrence	Jennifer Lawrence			Jennifer Lawrence^{C}^{U}^{A}	Jennifer Lawrence		
Dr. Henry "Hank" McCoy / Beast	Nicholas Hoult	Nicholas Hoult Kelsey Grammer^{O}^{C}	Nicholas Hoult			Nicholas Hoult^{C}^{U}^{A}	Nicholas Hoult		Mentioned
Dr. Klaus Schmidt / Sebastian Shaw	Kevin Bacon								
Man in Black Suit	Oliver Platt								
Janos Quested / Riptide	Alex Gonzalez								
Azazel	Jason Flemyng	Jason Flemyng^{P}							Eduardo Gago Muñoz
Angel Salvadore	Zoe Kravitz	Zoe Kravitz^{P}							
Emma Frost	January Jones	Mentioned							
Moira MacTaggert	Rose Byrne		Rose Byrne						
Alexander "Alex" Summers / Havok]]	Lucas Till	Lucas Till	Lucas Till						
Sean Cassidy/Banshee	Caleb Landry Jones	Mentioned							
Armando Muñoz / Darwin	Edi Gathegi								
John McCone	Matt Craven								
William Stryker Sr.	Don Creech								
Russian General	Rade Serbedzija								
Swiss Bank Manager	James Faulkner								
Pig Farmer and Tailor	Ludger Pistor (Pig Farmer) Wilfried Hochholdinger (Tailor)								
Dr. Leigh	Gregory Cox								
Colonel Hendry	Glenn Morshower								
Amy	Annabelle Wallis								
Jakob Lensherr	George Nikoloff								
Edie Lensherr	Eva Magyar								
Sharon Xavier	Beth Goddard								
Jean Grey / Phoenix		Famke Janssen^{O}^{C}	Sophie Turner			Sophie Turner^{C}^{U}^{A}	Sophie Turner		Mentioned
Peter Maximoff / Quicksilver		Evan Peters	Evan Peters			Evan Peters^{C}^{U}^{A}	Evan Peters		Mentioned
Scott Summers / Cyclops		James Marsden^{O}^{C}	Tye Sheridan			Tye Sheridan^{U}^{C}^{A}	Tye Sheridan		Mentioned
Ororo Munroe / Storm		Halle Berry^{O}	Alexandra Shipp			Alexandra Shipp^{U}^{C}^{A}	Alexandra Shipp		Mentioned
Marie D'Acanto / Rogue		Anna Paquin (Rogue Cut only)							
Mortimer Toynbee / Toad		Evan Jonigkeit							Daniel Ramos
Robert "Bobby" Drake / Iceman		Shawn Ashmore							
John Allerdyce / Pyro		Mentioned							Aaron Stanford
Peter Rasputin / Colossus		Daniel Cudmore		Stefan Kapicic		Stefan Kapicic			Stefan Kapicic
Jubilation Lee / Jubilee		Uncredited actress	Lana Condor						
Kitty Pryde		Ellen Page							
Major William Stryker		Josh Helman	Josh Helman						
Jason Stryker		Mentioned							
Bolivar Trask		Peter Dinklage							
Roberto "Bobby" Da Costa / Sunspot		Adan Canto						Henry Zaga	
Lucas Bishop		Omar Sy							
Clarice Ferguson / Blink		Fan Bingbing							
James Proudstar / Warpath		Booboo Stewart							
Senator Brickman		Michael Lerner							
US President Richard Nixon		Mark Camacho							
Eric Gitter / Ink		Gregg Lowe							
Daniels		Jaa Smith-Johnson							
Mrs. Maximoff		Zehra Leverman	Zehra Leverman						
Death, Pestilence, Famine and War		Uncredited actors^{C}	Monique Ganderton (Death) Warren Scherer (Pestilence) Rochelle Okoye (Famine) Fraser Aitcheson (War)						
Pharaoh En Sabah Nur / Apocalypse		Brendan Pedder^{U}^{C}^{Y}	Oscar Isaac Berj Garabedian^{O}^{U}						
Kurt Wagner / Nightcrawler			Kodi Smit-McPhee			Kodi Smit-McPhee^{U}^{C}^{A}	Kodi Smit-McPhee		
Warren Worthington III / Angel / Archangel			Ben Hardy			Mentioned			
Elizabeth "Betsy" Braddock / Psyclocke			Olivia Munn						Ayesha Hussain
Magda and Nina Gurzky			Carolina Bartczak (Magda) T.J. McGibbon (Nina)						
Caliban			Tomas Lemarquis		Stephen Merchant				
Christopher and Katherine Summers			Ryan Hollyman (Christopher) Joanne Bolland (Katherine)						
Frederick "Fred" Dukes / The Blob			"Giant" Gustave Claude Ouimet						Mike Waters
Dale Rice			Uncredited actor		Mentioned				
Wade Wilson / Deadpool				Ryan Reynolds		Ryan Reynolds			Ryan Reynolds
Vanessa Carlyle / Copycat				Morena Baccarin		Morena Baccarin			Morena Baccarin
Francis Freeman / Ajax				Ed Skrein					
Weasel				T.J. Miller		T.J. Miller			
Angel Dust				Gina Carano					
Negasonic Teenage Warhead				Brianna Hildebrand		Brianna Hildebrand			Brianna Hildebrand
Blind Al				Leslie Uggams		Leslie Uggams			Leslie Uggams
Dopinder				Karan Soni		Karan Soni			Karan Soni
Ajax Recruiter				Jed Rees					
Bob]				Rob Hayter					
Buck				Randal Reeder		Randal Reeder			Randal Reeder
Laura / X-23					Dafne Keen				Dafne Keen
Donald Pierce					Boyd Holbrook				
Zander Rice					Richard E. Grant				
Nurse Gabriela					Elizabeth Rodriguez				
Will and Kathryn Munson					Eriq La Salle (Will) Elise Neal (Kathryn)				
Rictor					Jason Genao				
Nathanial "Nathan" Summers / Cable						Josh Brolin			
Russell "Rusty" Collins / Firefist						Julian Dennison			
Domino						Zazie Beetz			
Yukio						Shioli Kutsuna			
Black Tom Cassidy						Jack Kesy			
The Headmaster						Eddie Marsan			
Cain Marko / Juggernaut						Ryan Reynolds			Aaron Reed
Sluggo						Robert Maillet			
Omega Red						Dakoda Shepley^{C}			
Mrs. Summers and Hope Summers						Hayley Sales (Mrs. Summers) Islie Hirvonen (Hope)			
Jesse Aaronson / Bedlam						Terry Crews			
Rusty / Shatterstar						Lewis Tan			Lewis Tan
Lawrence "Larry" Ekler / Zeitgeist						Bill Skarsgard			
Peter Wisdom						Rob Delaney			Rob Delaney
Telford Smith / Vanisher						Brad Pitt			
Vuk / Margaret Smith							Jessica Chastain		
Jones							Ato Essandoh		
John and Elaine Grey							Scott Shepherd (John) Hannah Emily Anderson (Elaine)		
President of the United States							Brian d'Arcy James		
Selene Gallio							Kota Eberhardt		
Ariki							Andrew Stehlin		
Match							Lamar Johnson		
Allison Blaire / Dazzler							Halston Sage		
Rahne Sinclair / Wolfsbane								Maisie Williams	
Samuel "Sam" Guthrie / Cannonball								Charlie Heaton	
Illyana Rasputin / Magik								Anya Taylor-Joy	
Danielle "Dani" Moonstar								Blu Hunt	
Dr. Cecilia Reyes								Alice Braga	
Smiley Men								Dustin Ceithamer (physical portrayal) Marilyn Manson (voices)	
Reverend Craig								Happy Anderson	
Thomas Guthrie								Thomas Kee	
William Lonestar								Adam Beach	
Cassandra Nova									Emma Corrin
Mr. Paradox									Matthew Macfadyen
Verity Willis / Hunter B-15									Wunmi Mosaku
Elektra Natchios									Jennifer Garner
Remy LeBeau / Gambit									Channing Tatum
Jonathan "Johnny" Storm / Human Torch									Chris Evans
Eric Brooks / Blade									Wesley Snipes
The Russian									Billy Clements
Lester / Bullseye									Curtis Small
Callisto									Chloe Kibbe
Yuriko Oyama / Lady Deathstrike									Jade Lye
Victor Creed / Sabretooth									Tyler Mane^{C}

== Introduced in X-Men (2000) ==
=== Scott Summers/Cyclops ===
Scott Summers/Cyclops (portrayed by James Marsden as an adult, Tim Pocock as a teenager in the original timeline, and Tye Sheridan as a teenager in the revised timeline) is a mutant and member of the X-Men who can fire destructive laser beams from his eyes and wears either sunglasses or a special visor to protect them.

Scott first appears in X-Men (2000) alongside Storm, rescuing Logan and Rogue from Sabretooth and bringing them to the X-Mansion. He rebuts Logan's advances on his fiancée, Jean. Scott goes to the train station with Storm to retrieve Rogue, where he is attacked by Toad, who removes his visor. After having his visor replaced, Scott finds out that Cerebro was sabotaged and that Xavier is now hospitalized. He leads the other X-Men to the final battle at the Statue of Liberty. Scott uses his charged-up visor to blast Sabretooth from the Statue and to his apparent death. They foil Magneto's plot and rescue Rogue. Logan leaves the Mansion to go to Alkali Lake using Scott's motorcycle.

In X2: X-Men United (2003), which takes place a few months after the first film, Scott learns that Jean is experiencing strange recurring dreams and changes in her mutant abilities. On the day Logan returns to the mansion, Scott accompanies Professor Xavier to Magneto's cell, where they are both kidnapped by Lady Deathstrike and brought to the base at Alkali Lake, where General William Stryker programs Scott to serve him.

Scott is deprogrammed when he attacks Jean, gets knocked out, and leaves with the X-Men. He is devastated when Jean sacrifices herself to launch the X-Jet as an impending wave from the damaged Alkali Lake is imminent. In X-Men: The Last Stand (2006), Scott is still mourning Jean and goes to Alkali Lake, where he sees her walk out of the water still alive. Scott is killed by her new powers, with a proper funeral then happening for him a few weeks later outside the X-Mansion.

In X-Men Origins: Wolverine (2009), a teenage Scott in 1988 gets detention for wearing sunglasses in a classroom and is attacked by mutant Victor Creed, who kidnaps him and imprisons him on Three Mile Island. Scott and the others are freed from their cells by Wolverine and Kayla Silverfox, who help them escape the base and go outside, where they meet Charles Xavier, who takes them into his X-Jet.

After the timeline is revised, Scott is resurrected and is briefly seen in the new timeline in 2023 alongside Jean Grey in the X-Mansion.

In X-Men: Apocalypse (2016), a teenage Scott in 1983 gains his powers for the first time at school, accidentally knocking out a bully. Scott's older brother, Alex (Havok), takes him to the X-Mansion, where he meets Hank McCoy and Charles Xavier. They test Scott's abilities and give him special sunglasses to block his powers. Scott meets Jean Grey, Jubilee, and Nightcrawler, and four of them hang out at a mall. They return to a destroyed X-Mansion, and Scott finds out that Alex died in the explosion of the mansion. After reeling over his brother's death, Scott, alongside Jean and Kurt, reunites with Hank and meets Mystique, Quicksilver, and Moira MacTaggert. William Stryker arrives, capturing Beast, Quicksilver, Mystique, and Moira, bringing them to his base in Alkali Lake and interrogating them. Scott, Jean, and Kurt stow away on the plane and into the base. Jean releases a mysterious mutant (Wolverine), who begins to massacre all the guards of Stryker's facility whilst the trio rescues their captured allies. The group suits up and boards a jet to Egypt, where Scott battles the Horseman Storm and is about to defeat her until she joins the X-Men's side against Apocalypse. At the end of the battle, Scott uses his powers alongside Xavier's and Jean's to kill Apocalypse. After the X-Mansion has been rebuilt, Scott uses a visor given to him by Hank and stands in the Danger Room as the team leader of the new X-Men team.

Before the events of Logan (2017), it is said that sometime in 2028, Charles Xavier suffered from a massive seizure caused by his Alzheimer's, which killed seven mutants alongside injuring 50 others. It is presumed that Scott is one of the mutants who died.

Scott makes a brief, uncredited cameo appearance in Deadpool 2 (2018), where he is seen meeting in Xavier's office with the other X-Men. He notices Deadpool talking loudly outside, causing Hank to close the door.

In X-Men: Dark Phoenix (2019), nine years have passed since the battle in Egypt, and Scott is in a relationship with Jean. The X-Men are called to rescue astronauts trapped in space when a mysterious cosmic entity (the Phoenix Force) attacks their shuttle, and Jean is the most affected. After returning to Earth, Jean's powers lash out at Scott. Jean leaves the next day, with Scott and the X-Men following her to her father's house. Jean injures Quicksilver, Storm, and Hank and accidentally kills Mystique. After Mystique's funeral, Scott, Charles, Storm, and Nightcrawler go to New York, where they fight Magneto's team (now including Hank) over Jean's life before they are then knocked out and taken by the US Military in collars to a mutant internment facility. Whilst on the train, Scott convinces Magneto's team not to kill Jean. The train is then attacked by the D'Bari attempting to take the Phoenix Force from Jean, causing the X-Men alongside Magneto's Brotherhood to break free, band together, and fight against the aliens before Jean finally transforms into the Dark Phoenix, kills the D'Bari, and sacrifices herself to destroy the Phoenix Force inside of her. Scott, grieving Jean, witnesses Charles quit as the school headmaster, give the title to Hank, and finally change the name of the school from Xavier's to Jean Grey's School for Gifted Youngsters to honor her memory.

Cyclops appeared in the tie-in video game X-Men: The Official Game, voiced by James Arnold Taylor.

James Marsden will reprise the role of Cyclops in Avengers: Doomsday (2026).

=== Ororo Munroe / Storm ===
Ororo Munroe / Storm (portrayed by Halle Berry as an adult and Alexandra Shipp as a teenager) is a member of the X-Men, a professor at the Xavier Institute, and a mutant who can control the weather, summoning lightning, storms, and blizzards.

Storm first appears in X-Men. She and Cyclops rescue Rogue and Wolverine from Sabretooth and bring them to the X-Mansion. Days later, Storm and Cyclops go to the train station to retrieve Rogue when she runs away, and are attacked by the Brotherhood of Mutants members Sabretooth and Toad. After the battle, Storm and Cyclops return to the X-Mansion to find Xavier in a coma. Storm finds anti-mutant senator Robert Kelly at the mansion's doorstep and, after bringing him in, finds that he has been artificially mutated before she witnesses him die from his unstable mutation. Storm informs the others about Kelly's death. She accompanies the rest of the team to fight the Brotherhood and rescue Rogue at the Statue of Liberty. They are attacked inside by Mystique and Toad, with Storm striking Toad with lightning and sending him flying into the ocean. Storm, along with the others, is then knocked out and tied up by Sabretooth. They escape, and Storm uses her powers to fly Wolverine up to save Rogue.

Storm next appears in X2. She accompanies Jean to confront Nightcrawler in a church, listens to his story, and recruits him. The three pick up the remaining mutants from the Drake residence in the X-Jet and fly away, using her powers to shake fighter jets coming after them. They fly to Alkali Lake, where Storm and Nightcrawler rescue the Xavier students and destroy the fake Cerebro, rescuing Xavier from Jason's mind control. Storm pilots the X-Jet but fails to take off, forcing Jean to sacrifice herself to prevent floodwater from hitting the jet.

In The Last Stand, Storm remains a member of the X-Men and a teacher. She accompanies Logan to search for Cyclops at Alkali Lake, only to find his visor and an unconscious Jean Grey. After Jean's escape, Storm and Logan go to the Grey residence, where Storm battles Callisto. She attends Professor X's funeral after Jean kills him. Storm battles alongside the X-Men to defend Alcatraz Island from Magneto's forces, killing Callisto with lightning during the battle. At the end of the film, Storm becomes the new headmistress of the Xavier Institute.

In Days of Future Past, Storm is a survivor of the Sentinels and works alongside the Free Mutants. She is killed first in the final battle, when a Sentinel climbs the wall behind her and spears her, throwing her body from the cliff. In the revised timeline, she is seen at the Xavier Institute.

A young Ororo appears in Apocalypse, where she is a thief in Cairo before being recruited as a Horseman by Apocalypse, turning her hair white in the process. She fights the X-Men, but in the final battle turns against Apocalypse due to witnessing his cruelty, preventing his escape with her powers. The young Storm joins the X-Men and subsequently appears as a member in Dark Phoenix. This young version also makes a cameo in Deadpool 2.

Young depictions of Storm appear as cameos in First Class and in a deleted scene of X-Men: Origins (portrayed by April Elleston Enahoro). She also appears in X-Men: The Official Game, voiced by Debra Wilson.

=== Marie D'Canto / Rogue ===
Marie D'Canto / Rogue (portrayed by Anna Paquin) is a mutant with the power to absorb others' lifeforce and powers through skin contact. She is, at times, a student at the Xavier Institute and a member of the X-Men.

Rogue first appears in X-Men in her bedroom speaking to her boyfriend David. When the pair kiss, David falls into a coma, causing Rogue to run away from home. On her travels, she meets Wolverine at a bar and stows away in the back of his vehicle. He catches her and allows her to ride with him, but they are both attacked by Sabretooth. They are later rescued by Storm and Cyclops and taken to the Xavier Institute. Rogue is enrolled as a student and quickly befriends Bobby Drake (Iceman). During the night at the school, Rogue checks on Logan, who is having a nightmare, and is stabbed by him in his sleep. She uses her powers on Logan to absorb his healing powers, which many students witness. She is convinced to leave the institute by Mystique disguised as Bobby. She gets on a train where she is captured by the Brotherhood. She is taken to the Statue of Liberty, where Magneto attempts to use her as a battery for his powers in his mutation-inducing machine. The X-Men save her, but she is left with a white streak in her hair. She returns to the mansion after this.

Paquin reprised her role in X2: X-Men United. Rogue has become an active member of the X-Men and entered into a relationship with Bobby, which is strained by their inability to touch. Rogue appears again in X-Men: The Last Stand, in which she takes the Mutant Cure after witnessing Bobby getting close with Kitty Pryde.

Rogue appeared next in the alternate release of X-Men: Days of Future Past, titled The Rogue Cut. In the future, Rogue has been captured by the Sentinels and is being experimented on for her unique abilities. She is rescued by the Free Mutants and made to absorb Kitty's power to send Logan's consciousness back in time. In the revised timeline, Rogue is at the mansion and continues to pursue a relationship with Bobby.

=== Victor Creed / Sabretooth ===
Victor Creed / Sabretooth (portrayed by Tyler Mane in X-Men and Deadpool and Wolverine, and by Liev Schreiber in X-Men Origins: Wolverine) is a mutant with feral qualities, including claws and sharp teeth, as well as enhanced senses, strength, reflexes, and a regenerative healing factor. He has been a member of the Brotherhood and Team X.

Sabretooth is first seen as a member of the Brotherhood in X-Men (2000) attacking Rogue and Wolverine in the Canadian wilderness. He later fought Storm in a train station, and supposedly died fighting Wolverine on the Statue of Liberty. He is revealed to be alive in X-Men: The Official Game (voiced by Tyler Mane), but is killed by Wolverine. He also appears in the non-canon X2: Wolverine's Revenge, voiced by Fred Tatasciore.

In X-Men Origins: Wolverine (2009), Sabretooth is revealed as the half-brother of James Howlett/Wolverine. After Wolverine kills their father, Thomas Logan, the two boys leave their home. They fight and live through many historical wars, including the American Civil War and the Vietnam War, before joining William Stryker's black ops team, Team X. Wolverine eventually leaves the team, but Victor stays on and is tasked with tricking Wolverine into undergoing the Adamantium bonding process. The two eventually work together to defeat Wade Wilson/Weapon XI, their former teammate.

Tyler Mane reprised the role in Deadpool and Wolverine (2024), where he works with Cassandra Nova in the Void. He is quickly decapitated by Wolverine.

=== Mortimer Toynbee / Toad ===
Mortimer Toynbee / Toad (portrayed by Ray Park in X-Men, Evan Jonigkeit in Days of Future Past, and Daniel Medina Ramos in Deadpool & Wolverine) is a mutant with toad-like qualities, including a prehensile tongue, wall crawling, and the ability to spit slime and jump great distances.

Toad is first introduced as a British member of the Brotherhood of Mutants. During the final battle, Storm strikes him with lightning and flings him into the Hudson River, killing him. But right before she does, Storm delivers a line that has become infamous as one of the series's worst: "Do you know what happens to a toad when it’s struck by lightning? The same thing that happens to everything else."

In Days of Future Past, Toad is shown as a prisoner of Stryker in Vietnam before being freed by Mystique. He is later seen working at a restaurant.

A variant of Toad is a member of Cassandra Nova's gang in the Void.

=== Bobby Drake / Iceman ===
Bobby Drake / Iceman (portrayed by Shawn Ashmore) is a mutant with the power of cryokinesis. He is originally a student of the Xavier Institute, before later joining the X-Men.

Iceman is first shown as a student at the institute, where he briefly flirts with Rogue. Mystique impersonates him to infiltrate the school. In X2, Bobby escapes the siege of the school and takes the remaining mutants to his parents' house, where it is revealed that his parents, William (Alf Humphreys) and Madeline (Jill Teed), are oblivious to the nature of the school. His younger brother Ronny (Brian Kirk) calls the authorities on the group, but they make their escape. In The Last Stand, Iceman and Rogue's relationship is strained because of his closeness with Kitty Pryde and Rogue's inability to touch him, which leads her to seek the mutant cure. He joins the X-Men in the final battle, where he battles and defeats Pyro and gains the ability to change his full body to ice.

In Days of Future Past, Iceman is a survivor of the Sentinels in the future. He is killed once before Bishop resets the timeline, and killed once more saving Rogue in the Rogue Cut. In the revised timeline, he is at the Institute dating Rogue.

Ashmore voiced the character in X-Men: The Official Game.

=== John Allerdyce / Pyro ===
John Allerdyce / Pyro (portrayed by Alexander Burton in X-Men and Aaron Stanford in other appearances) is a mutant with the ability to manipulate fire but not create it, causing him to use a Zippo lighter. He is a student at the Xavier Institute before joining the Brotherhood.

Pyro is briefly shown as a student at the institute. In X2, he defects to the Brotherhood at the end of the film. In The Last Stand, he assists Magneto's cause and is defeated by Iceman in the final battle. He appears in X-Men: The Official Game, voiced by Steve Van Wormer.

In Deadpool and Wolverine, Pyro works for Cassandra Nova in the Void, while also secretly working with the TVA. He is later killed by Nova.

=== Robert Kelly ===
Senator Robert Kelly (portrayed by Bruce Davison) is a United States senator who advocated for the Mutant Registration Act. He is kidnapped by Mystique and Toad and turned into a jellyfish-like mutant by Magneto's machine. He escapes and turns up on a beach in the United States before going to the Xavier Institute for help. His body slowly destabilizes into water, killing him in front of Storm.

=== Kitty Pryde / Shadowcat ===
Kitty Pryde / Shadowcat (portrayed by Sumela Kay in X-Men, Katie Stuart in X2, and Elliot Page in other appearances) is a mutant with the ability to phase through solid matter, and later the ability to send a person's mind back into their past selves. She is a student at the Institute and later joins the X-Men.

Kitty is seen as a student in the first two films. In The Last Stand, Kitty gets close with Iceman, to Rogue's jealousy. She joins the final battle, where she protects Leech from Juggernaut.

In Days of Future Past, Kitty is a survivor and has gained the ability of chronoskimming, which she uses to help the team survive. She sends Wolverine back in time to deter the mobilization of the Sentinels. Wolverine stabs her, causing the team to recover Rogue to take her place in the Rogue Cut. In the revised timeline, she is a teacher at the institute.

=== Piotr "Peter" Rasputin / Colossus ===
Piotr "Peter" Rasputin / Colossus (portrayed by Donald McKinnon in X-Men and Daniel Cudmore in other X-Men films; voiced by Stefan Kapičić and motion-captured by Andre Tricoteux in the Deadpool films) is a mutant with the ability to turn his skin into organic steel, granting him enhanced strength and durability.

Colossus is seen in a cameo in the first film. In X2, he saves fellow students from the raid. In The Last Stand, he is seen training in the Danger Room at the beginning of the film, and joins the final battle alongside the X-Men on Alcatraz Island.

In Days of Future Past, Colossus is a survivor of the Sentinels. He is killed by a Sentinel before Kitty resets time with Bishop. He is later killed again by being ripped apart by two Sentinels. In the revised timeline, he is a teacher at the Institute alongside Kitty. Promotional material revealed that Colossus' mutation was a result of the Chernobyl disaster.

Colossus appears in the three Deadpool films as a Russian member of the X-Men, often alongside Negasonic Teenage Warhead. In Deadpool, Colossus assists Deadpool in defeating Ajax, fighting Angel Dust. In Deadpool 2, he convinces Deadpool to join the X-Men and fights Juggernaut. In Deadpool & Wolverine, Colossus attends Deadpool's birthday party. This version is constantly in steel form, as compared to the X-Men film counterpart.

T.J. Storm, Glenn Ennis, and Greg LaSalle were also responsible for motion and facial capture in the first Deadpool film. Colossus appears in the tie-in video games X2: Wolverine's Revenge (voiced by Christopher Corey Smith) and X-Men: The Official Game (voiced by Brad Abrell), and is a playable character in the Game Boy Advance version of the latter.

=== Jubilation Lee / Jubilee ===
Jubilation Lee / Jubilee (portrayed by Katrina Florece in X-Men, Kea Wong in X2 and The Last Stand, and Lana Condor in Apocalypse) is a mutant with the ability to create explosive energy charges from her hands. She is a student at the institute.

Jubilee is shown as a student in the early 2000s in the first three films, as well as in the 1980s in Apocalypse. She never uses her powers outside of deleted scenes. Concept art revealed her planned inclusion in the future of Days of Future Past, played by Jamie Chung, but this was scrapped.

== Introduced in X2 (2003) ==
=== Kurt Wagner / Nightcrawler ===
Kurt Wagner / Nightcrawler (portrayed by Alan Cumming in X2 and Kodi Smit-McPhee in Apocalypse and Dark Phoenix) is a German mutant with blue skin, a prehensile tail, demonic features, and the ability to teleport.

Nightcrawler is first seen in the opening scenes of X2, trying to execute the president in the White House. He is sought out by Storm and Jean in a church, who learn he is being manipulated and recruit him to the team. He helps Storm rescue the Xavier students and Xavier himself at Alkali Lake. It is revealed he leaves the team in X-Men: The Official Game (voiced by Alan Cumming), due to the violent nature of their lives.

In Apocalypse, a young Nightcrawler is saved by Mystique from a cage fight with Angel, in which he badly damages the latter's wings. He is taken to the institute, and teleports Jean and Cyclops into Stryker's plane when he kidnaps other X-Men members. He joins the final battle in Egypt, fighting Angel (now Archangel). Nightcrawler is a member of the X-Men in Dark Phoenix. This version also makes a cameo in Deadpool 2.

Alan Cumming is set to reprise the role in Avengers: Doomsday (2026).

=== William Stryker ===
William Stryker (portrayed by Brian Cox in X2, Danny Huston in X-Men Origins: Wolverine, and Josh Helman in Days of Future Past and Apocalypse) is an American Colonel, and leader of Team X and Weapon X, with an intolerance for mutants.

In X2, Stryker is the main antagonist. He raids the institute, kidnapping many young mutants and Xavier, and takes them to his base at Alkali Lake. Here, it is revealed he plans to use his mutant son Jason's illusory powers and a copy of Cerebro to make the Professor psychically kill all mutants. The plan is thwarted by the X-Men and Brotherhood, and Stryker is left to die in the destruction of Alkali Lake by Wolverine. It is revealed by Magneto during the film that Stryker grafted the Adamantium onto Wolverine's bones.

In X-Men Origins: Wolverine, Stryker's backstory shows him as the leader of Weapon X and Team X who manipulated Wolverine into the adamantium bonding process and wiped his mind with a shot to the head. He is manipulated by Silverfox to leave the facility after he attempts to kill her.

In Days of Future Past, a young Stryker is working with Bolivar Trask. In the original timeline, he apprehends Mystique after she assassinates Trask and uses her DNA to implement it in Sentinels. In the revised timeline, he captures Wolverine for Weapon X. In Apocalypse, he attacks the mansion and captures Moira MacTaggert, Beast, Quicksilver, and Mystique, and interrogates them about Xavier's whereabouts. After the feral Wolverine is released within the facility, Stryker escapes. He is arrested at the end of the film.

=== Jason Stryker ===
Jason Wyngarde (portrayed by Michael Reid McKay and Keely Purvis (illusion)) is a mutant with heterochromic eyes and the ability to project illusions into people's minds. He is also a wheelchair user who cannot speak.

He is William Stryker's son. He was previously a student at the institute, but is removed by his father. This causes the young Jason to use his powers against his parents, leading to his mother's suicide. This causes his father to cryogenically freeze the young boy, before lobotomizing him and turning his spinal fluid into a potent compound to influence other mutants, including Nightcrawler, Lady Deathstrike, and Cyclops. His father uses him to manipulate Professor X into using a copy of Cerebro to kill all mutants on the planet. His actions are thwarted by Storm lowering the room temperature.

His body is destroyed in the destruction of Alkali Lake. His psyche, however, is revealed to still exist as two separate entities in the tie-in video game X-Men: The Official Game, where he is voiced by Steve Blum as an adult, and Grey Delisle as a child. One part of the psyche assists Nightcrawler, while the other pilots a Master Mold, before they both die.

=== Yuriko Oyama / Lady Deathstrike ===
Yuriko Oyama / Lady Deathstrike (portrayed by Kelly Hu in X2 and Jade Lye in Deadpool & Wolverine) is a mutant with extendable adamantium claws and accelerated healing.

In X2, Deathstrike is a mutant manipulated by Stryker into being his bodyguard. She kidnaps the Professor and Cyclops and takes the pair to Alkali Lake. She fights with Wolverine and is "killed" when injected with molten adamantium. She appears alive again in the tie-in videogame X-Men: The Official Game (voiced by Vyvan Pham), working alongside Hydra and Silver Samurai, until she is killed again by Wolverine.

A variant appears in Deadpool & Wolverine as a lackey of Cassandra Nova in the Void.

=== Hank McCoy / Beast ===
Hank McCoy / Beast (portrayed by Steve Bacic in X2, Kelsey Grammer in The Last Stand and Days of Future Past, and Nicholas Hoult in other appearances) is a mutant with prehensile feet, enhanced agility, and strength. He later develops further mutations, including animalistic features, blue skin, and fur. He is an accomplished politician and scientist, as well as a mutant rights activist.

Beast appears on a TV screen in X2, making a full appearance in The Last Stand as the Secretary of Mutant Affairs for the U.S. Cabinet with a history with the X-Men. He resigns to help the X-Men defend the mutant cure facility on Alcatraz Island, and is appointed United States Ambassador to the United Nations. In the original timeline, Beast is killed by human protestors in 2015. Grammer reprises the role in the revised timeline of Days of Future Past as a member of the Xavier Institute.

A young Hank is introduced in X-Men: First Class as a member of the CIA, working in Division X. He is a closeted mutant until Xavier accidentally reveals him. He joins the X-Men training team. When he tries to cure his mutation with a serum of Mystique's DNA, he transforms into the bestial, blue-furred form seen later in life. In Days of Future Past, he is able to temporarily repress his bestial form. He is recruited by Wolverine to assist in the mission to stop Mystique. He continues to use the serum in Apocalypse but can revert to his bestial form, as shown when he joins the final battle. He appears in Dark Phoenix alongside the team in space to fight Jean. The young version appears as a cameo in Deadpool 2.

Beast appears in X-Men: The Official Game and X2: Wolverine's Revenge, voiced by Gregg Berger and Richard Portnow, respectively.

Beast was intended for the first X-Men film, but was ultimately scrapped. Nicholas Hoult was supposed to star in a spin-off film which was later canceled. Grammer reprises the role as an alternate version of the character in the 2023 MCU film, The Marvels, and is set to appear in Avengers: Doomsday.

== Introduced in X-Men: The Last Stand (2006) ==
=== Warren Worthington III / Angel / Archangel ===
Warren Worthington III / Angel / Archangel (portrayed by Ben Foster (adult) and Cayden Boyd (child) in The Last Stand, and Ben Hardy in Apocalypse) is a wealthy mutant with large feathered wings. In Apocalypse, Warren's wings are damaged and replaced with metal wings capable of firing projectiles.

In the opening scenes of The Last Stand, a young Warren is shown shaving off feathers from his growing wings when his father catches him. He is next shown as an adult being strapped to a table, ready to be administered the mutant cure, but he breaks free and throws himself from the window, flying away to the Xavier Institute. During the battle of Alcatraz, Angel saves his father from being thrown from a building by the Omegas. Promotional material revealed that Angel would be killed by Sentinels in the future.

In Apocalypse, Angel is introduced as a young mutant in a cage fight with Nightcrawler. Nightcrawler badly damages Angel's wings, causing him to turn to substance abuse. Apocalypse approaches Angel, turns his wings metallic, and recruits him as Archangel, the Horseman of Death. He battles Nightcrawler in Egypt, but is defeated when he crashes inside the X-Men's jet.

Concepts of Angel were cut from the first two X-Men films.

=== Jimmy / Leech ===
Jimmy / Leech (portrayed by Cameron Bright) is a young mutant with the ability to nullify mutations of mutants in his vicinity. Worthington Labs uses him to develop the mutant cure. Leech becomes a target for Magneto's army, but is saved by Kitty Pryde from the Juggernaut. He enrolls at the Xavier Institute at the end of the film.

=== Warren Worthington II ===
Warren Worthington II (portrayed by Michael Murphy) is the wealthy father of Angel, and head of Worthington Labs who works on developing a mutant cure.

In the opening scene of The Last Stand, Worthington discovers his son trying to shave off feathers from his back, a result of his mutation. Over the next decade, he dedicates himself to finding a mutant cure. When he is successful, he first tries to give it to his son, but he refuses and escapes. Worthington is almost killed by the Omegas during the assault on the labs, but is saved by his son.

=== Kavita Rao ===
Dr. Kavita Rao (portrayed by Shohreh Aghdashloo) is Warren Worthington II's lead scientist at Worthington Labs. She is in the lab during the assault and is killed by Quill.

=== The Omegas ===
The Omegas are a group of mutants gathered by Magneto to join his cause and attack Alcatraz Island to destroy the mutant cure by killing the mutant Leech. They are recruited at a rundown church and set up an encampment in the woods.

Notable members included Callisto (Dania Ramirez), a mutant with the abilities of super-speed and to locate and analyze mutant powers; Quill (Ken Leung; wrongly credited as Kid Omega), a mutant with the ability to grow sharp quills out of his body; Arclight (Omahyra Mota), a mutant with the ability to create shockwaves by clapping her hands; Psylocke (Meiling Melançon) a mutant with the ability to teleport through shadows; Multiple Man (Eric Dane), a man capable of creating many identical copies of himself; and Juggernaut (Vinnie Jones). Other named members included Ash, Phat, Anole, and Glob Herman.

Callisto is killed by Storm when she is hit by lightning on a metal fence. Quill, Arclight, and Psylocke are disintegrated by the Phoenix when escaping Alcatraz. Multiple Man is apprehended by the authorities while acting as a distraction. Juggernaut is knocked out in the facility.

Alternate versions of Callisto (Chloe Kibble), Arclight (Jessica Walker), Psylocke (Ayesha Hussain), Juggernaut (Aaron W. Reed), and a female Quill (Nilly Cetin) appear in Deadpool & Wolverine. Eric Dane reprised his role to voice Multiple Man in X-Men: The Official Game.

=== Cain Marco / Juggernaut ===
Cain Marco / Juggernaut (portrayed by Vinnie Jones in The Last Stand, Aaron W. Reed in Deadpool & Wolverine, and David Leitch in Deadpool 2, voiced by Ryan Reynolds) is a mutant with superhuman strength and durability, who wears a distinctive helmet.

Juggernaut in The Last Stand is freed from a transport truck by Magneto, along with Mystique and Multiple Man. During the battle of Alcatraz, he is tasked with finding and killing Leech, but is slowed down and defeated by Kitty Pryde.

Juggernaut in Deadpool 2 is much larger and is a prisoner of the Ice Box prison. He befriends Russell Collins. Russell frees him from containment, and he fights the X-Men but is defeated.

In Deadpool & Wolverine, Juggernaut appears as a member of Cassandra Nova's gang in the Void. He is decapitated by X-23, and his helmet is used to nullify Nova's powers. Vinnie Jones turned down the role due to the demands of the costume.

=== Psylocke ===
Psylocke (portrayed by Meiling Melançon in The Last Stand, Olivia Munn in Apocalypse, and Ayesha Hussain in Deadpool & Wolverine) is the name of multiple mutants in the films.

A character credited as Psylocke appears in The Last Stand, but is never referred to as Psylocke. This version can teleport through shadows, is a member of the Omegas, and is killed by the Phoenix.

Betsy Braddock appears in Apocalypse as Psylocke, the mutant bodyguard for Caliban, with psionic powers which she projects into a psychic sword. Apocalypse recruits her and gives her more power to become Pestilence, a member of the Horsemen. She leaves when Apocalypse is defeated.

Psylocke appears in the Void as a member of Cassandra Nova's gang. She wields a psionic whip and is killed by X-23.

=== Moira MacTaggert ===
Moira MacTaggert (portrayed by Olivia Williams in The Last Stand and Rose Byrne in other appearances) is a CIA agent, doctor, and ally to the X-Men.

In The Last Stand, Moira is a doctor teaching students at the Institute remotely from her base on Muir Island, where she cares for Xavier's brain-dead brother. After Xavier's death, his consciousness enters his brother's body and greets Moira.

In First Class, Moira is an American CIA agent who infiltrates the Hellfire Club and begins work with a young Charles Xavier to defeat them. She is initiated into Division X and helps Charles and Erik train the newly recruited class of X-Men. She is present at the final battle in Cuba, firing shots at Magneto, one of which is deflected into Xavier's spine, paralyzing him from the waist down. She becomes his caretaker until he wipes her memory. She leaves the CIA to become a doctor, as she is in The Last Stand.

In the revised timeline, Moira appears in Apocalypse. Moira continues her work with the CIA and has had a son, been married, and been divorced. While investigating mutant cults in Cairo, Moira discovers Apocalypse's awakening. After the destruction of the mansion, Moira and the others are taken by Colonel Stryker and interrogated, until the student X-Men free them. After the final battle, Xavier restores Moira's memories. Moira has Stryker arrested for treason at the end of the film.

=== John and Elaine Grey ===
John and Elaine Grey (portrayed by Adrian Hough and Desiree Zurowski in The Last Stand; Scott Shepherd and Hannah Emily Anderson in Dark Phoenix) are the human parents of Jean Grey. John and Elaine enroll Jean in the Xavier Institute in the original timeline, and they are visited by the Phoenix persona in The Last Stand. In Dark Phoenix, Elaine is killed in a car accident caused by Jean's emerging powers, while John is killed by Vuk searching for Jean.

== Introduced in X-Men Origins: Wolverine (2009) ==
=== Kayla Silverfox ===
Kayla Silverfox (portrayed by Lynn Collins) is a Native American mutant with the power to hypnotize those she touches, and a former lover of Wolverine.

Silverfox is tasked with monitoring Wolverine after he left Team X, and they live together in the Canadian Rockies, where she gives him the idea for the name Wolverine. She is seemingly killed by Sabretooth, but it is later revealed that she is only faking it to manipulate Wolverine into the adamantium bonding process, and that she is working with Stryker to free her sister, Emma, from the Weapon X facility. She assists Logan in freeing the facility's prisoners, admitting her love for him, but is wounded by a sniper during the escape. She uses her abilities to punish Stryker before dying.

=== John Wraith / Kestrel ===
John Wraith / Kestrel (portrayed by will.i.am) is a mutant with the ability to teleport and a former member of Team X.

Wraith opened a fitness center in Las Vegas after Team X disbanded. He reveals vital information to Logan and accompanies him to New Orleans to find Gambit. He is killed in a battle with Sabretooth, and his DNA is used in Weapon XI.

=== David North / Agent Zero ===
David North / Agent Zero (portrayed by Daniel Henney) is a mutant with superhuman accuracy, reflexes, and agility, making him a notable assassin in Team X.

Agent Zero kills Heather (Julia Blake) and Travis Hudson (Max Cullen), an elderly couple sheltering Wolverine. He is killed when his helicopter crashes and Wolverine drops a lit cigar on a trail of fuel, causing it to explode.

=== Chris Bradley ===
Chris Bradley (portrayed by Dominic Monaghan) is a mutant with the ability to control electrically powered objects and receive radio transmissions remotely. After the disbanding of Team X, Bradley works at a circus, but is murdered by Sabretooth.

=== Fred Dukes / Blob ===
Fred Dukes / Blob (portrayed by Kevin Durand in Origins: Wolverine, Gustav Claude Ouimet in Apocalypse, and Mike Waters in Deadpool & Wolverine) is an overweight mutant with increased strength and durability. He is a member of Team X, and later becomes a professional boxer.

In Origins: Wolverine, Dukes becomes overweight after Team X disbands and takes up boxing. He reveals key information to Logan about Weapon XI. He is killed by Sabretooth. In Apocalypse, he makes a brief cameo, being defeated by Angel in a cage match. A variant of Blob is a member of Cassandra Nova's gang in the Void.

Blob was scrapped from early drafts of the first X-Men film.

=== Remy LeBeau / Gambit ===
Remy LeBeau / Gambit (portrayed by Taylor Kitsch in Origins: Wolverine and Channing Tatum in Deadpool & Wolverine) is a Cajun mutant with the ability to charge objects with kinetic energy, causing them to explode.

In Origins: Wolverine, Gambit is a mutant previously held captive by Stryker, who resides in New Orleans. Wolverine confronts him, leading to a fight. Wolverine explains his intentions, and Gambit assists him, taking him to Stryker's island base. He saved Wolverine from falling debris later in the film.

In Deadpool & Wolverine, Gambit resides in the Void alongside Blade and Elektra, opposing Cassandra Nova's regime. This version speaks in a heavy Cajun accent. He survives the ending of the film, and Tatum has been announced to reprise the role in Avengers: Doomsday.

Gambit was cut from X2 (portrayed by James Bamford), and The Last Stand. Tatum was set to portray the character in Apocalypse, followed by a self-titled solo film. Gambit was cut from Apocalypse, and after several pushbacks, the solo film was shelved in 2019 due to the abandonment by multiple directors and Disney acquisition of Fox.

=== Weapon X ===
Abraham Cornelius and Carol Frost (portrayed by David Ritchie and Asher Keddie) are scientists working alongside Stryker and responsible for Wolverine's adamantium bonding procedure.

General Munson (portrayed by Stephen Leeder) is a U.S. Army general and sponsor of the Weapon X program. He instructs William Stryker to end his experiments during Weapon XI, causing Stryker to kill him.

Cornelius and Frost appear in the tie-in videogame X-Men Origins: Wolverine (voiced by David Prince and Anna Graves). Cornelius and Carol Hines both appear in the non-canon X2: Wolverine's Revenge (voiced by Don Morrow and Jennifer Hale).

== Introduced in X-Men: First Class (2011) ==
=== Alex Summers / Havok ===
Alex Summers / Havok (portrayed by Lucas Till) is a mutant with the ability to generate plasma discs from his body. He is the older brother of Cyclops and a former member of the X-Men.

In First Class, Havok is recruited from a military prison to join the X-Men. He showcases his powers to his fellow trainees. When the Hellfire Club arrives, he attempts to use his powers to attack Shaw. However, Shaw absorbs the energy and kills Darwin with it. Havok joins the attack against the Hellfire Club in Cuba. In Days of Future Past, Mystique rescues Havok from Stryker's forces, who want to experiment on him and other mutant soldiers from the Vietnam War.

In Apocalypse, Havok is at the Xavier Institute with his brother Scott. When Apocalypse kidnaps Xavier, Havok attacks, exploding a generator and the whole school. He dies as a result and is unable to be saved by Quicksilver due to his proximity to the blast.

=== Sean Cassidy / Banshee ===
Sean Cassidy / Banshee (portrayed by Caleb Landry Jones) is a mutant with a supersonic scream, capable of shattering glass and propelling him into the air. He is a former member of the X-Men.

Banshee is recruited to the X-Men and takes part in the battle against the Hellfire Club. He is killed by Trask's experimentation after the film.

Robert Sheehan was originally cast in the role before being forced to drop out due to scheduling conflicts with Misfits. Additionally, an uncredited Josh Ramsay provides vocal effects for Banshee's sonic screams.

=== Armando Muñoz / Darwin ===
Armando Muñoz / Darwin (portrayed by Edi Gathegi) is a mutant with the power of rapid evolution to any danger or environment. He is a former member of the X-Men.

Darwin is a cab driver recruited to the X-Men. During the Hellfire Club's assault, Darwin pretends to defect so he can protect Angel from Havok's plasma blasts. Shaw absorbs these blasts and uses them to kill Darwin.

=== Angel Salvadore ===
Angel Salvadore (portrayed by Zoë Kravitz) is a mutant with insect-like wings and the ability to spit acid. She defects from the X-Men to the Hellfire Club.

Angel is a stripper recruited to the X-Men during the Hellfire Club's assault. She fights the X-Men in Cuba before joining Magneto's Brotherhood of Mutants. She is killed by Trask's experimentation after the film, evident by one of her amputated wings.

=== Sebastian Shaw ===
Sebastian Shaw (portrayed by Kevin Bacon) is a mutant with the power to absorb and redirect energy, as well as maintain his youth. He was the leader of the Hellfire Club.

Shaw is first shown as Nazi scientist Klaus Schmidt, interested in young Erik Lensherr's mutant ability. He kills his mother in front of him to coerce him to use his power. Later in life, Shaw begins operations with his Hellfire Club to enact nuclear war, allowing mutant kind to rise from the fallen human civilization. He manipulates military officials to place strategic nuclear warheads. Shaw learns the X-Men are being recruited, and attacks the facility, recruiting Angel Salvadore and killing Darwin.

Shaw forces a Soviet official to send missiles to Cuba. While accompanying the missiles in a submarine, Magneto lifts it from the water and confronts Shaw, removing his helmet and allowing Xavier to freeze him telepathically. Magneto kills Shaw by pushing a Nazi coin through his head, and takes over his role as leader.

=== Emma Frost ===
Emma Frost (portrayed by January Jones; Tahyna Tozzi as Emma Silverfox) is a mutant with telepathic abilities and the ability to turn her skin into diamond.

A character based on Emma Frost (named Emma Silverfox) appeared in X-Men: Origins as the sister of Kayla Silverfox and a mutant prisoner of Stryker.

Emma Frost appeared in First Class. She acted as Shaw's second-in-command until her capture by the X-Men in the USSR. She is later freed by Magneto and joins his Brotherhood of Mutants. She is killed after the events of the film by Trask's experiments. A tie-in comic revealed her backstory as working for a Mafia boss.

Frost was initially set to appear in The Last Stand, portrayed by Sigourney Weaver, but didn't appear after director Bryan Singer left the project. Further plans for her to appear in Dark Phoenix were also cut.

=== Azazel ===
Azazel (portrayed by Jason Flemyng in First Class and Eduardo Gago Munoz in Deadpool & Wolverine) is a mutant with red skin, a prehensile tail, a demonic appearance, and the ability to teleport. He is a member of the Hellfire Club.

Azazel is the Hellfire Club's teleporter, teleporting Colonel Hendry to and using his ability to kill Division X agents by dropping them from a height. He was present at the Cuban Missile Crisis and teleported the newly formed Brotherhood of Mutants away from the beach. He is killed by Trask's experimentation after the events of the film. Simon Kinberg revealed him to be Mystique's father, but this is never revealed in the films.

A variant of Azazel appears in Deadpool & Wolverine as a member of Cassandra Nova's gang.

=== Riptide ===
Riptide (portrayed by Álex González) is a mutant with the ability to create tornadoes with his hands. He is a member of the Hellfire Club, taking part in attacks on Division X and the Cuban Missile Crisis. He joins the new Brotherhood of Mutants under Magneto.

=== Man in Black ===
The Man in Black Suit (portrayed by Oliver Platt) is an unnamed CIA agent and head of Division X, a government agency working with the X-Men. He is killed by Azazel when he attacks the CIA facility, teleporting him into the air and letting him fall to his death.

Vaughn considered his friend Dexter Fletcher for the part, but the studio felt the cast had too many British actors, and Fletcher himself declined to direct Wild Bill (2011).

== Introduced in The Wolverine (2013) ==
=== Mariko Yashida ===
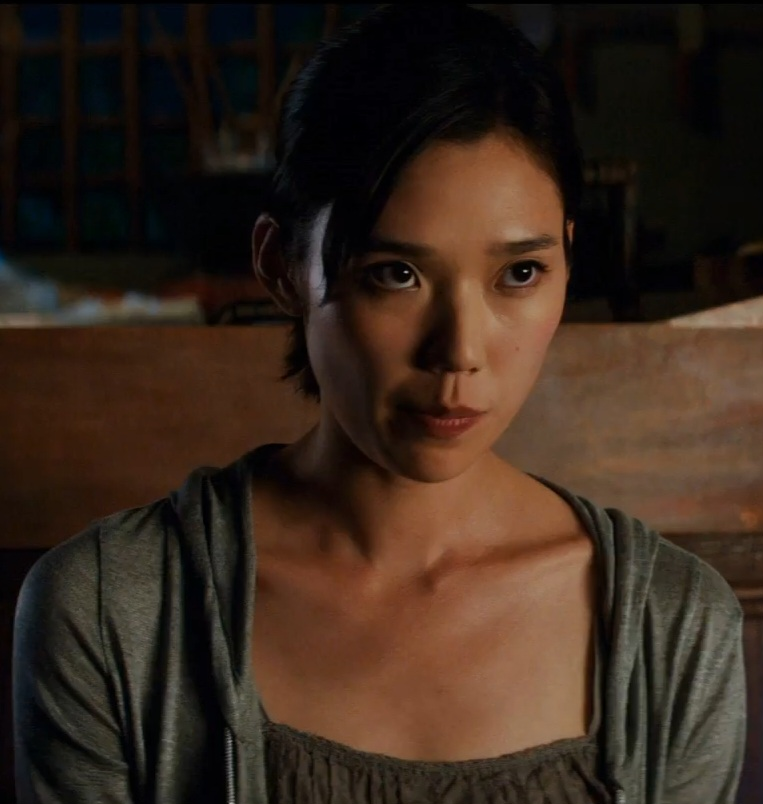
Mariko, as portrayed by Tao Okamoto

Mariko Yashida (portrayed by Tao Okamoto) is Shingen's daughter and Wolverine's lover.

During The Wolverine, the Yakuza try to kidnap Mariko because she is the benefactor of her grandfather's company. Her own father attempts to kill her, and she is also kidnapped by her former lover Harada and taken to Viper. She ultimately kills the Silver Samurai, and takes over her grandfather's company.

=== Yukio ===
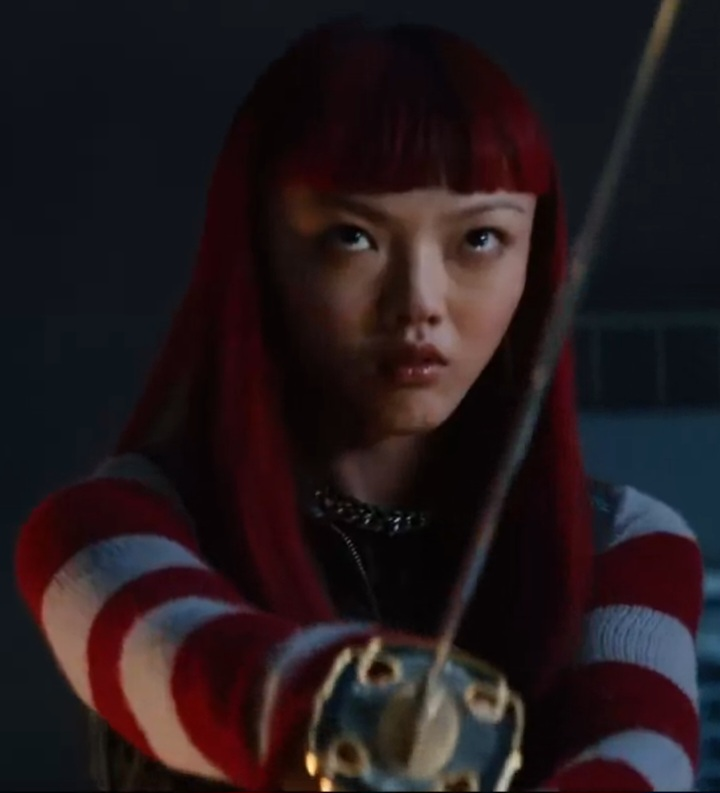
Yukio, as portrayed by Rila Fukushima

Yukio (portrayed by Rila Fukushima; Shioli Kutsuna in the Deadpool films) is the name of two mutants. The first is a Japanese mutant with the ability to see how someone will die. The second is a young X-Men member with electrokinesis.

The precognitive mutant Yukio is a member of the Yashida clan, who is trained in martial arts. She foresees Logan's death, as she foresaw her own parents' death when she was young. She assists Logan throughout the film.

The electrokinetic Yukio is a member of the X-Men and the girlfriend of Negasonic Teenage Warhead. She helped defeat Juggernaut in Deadpool 2 and attended Wade's birthday in Deadpool & Wolverine. Fans speculated that she might have been another character, Surge, but this was debunked by the screenwriters.

=== Ichirō Yashida / Silver Samurai ===
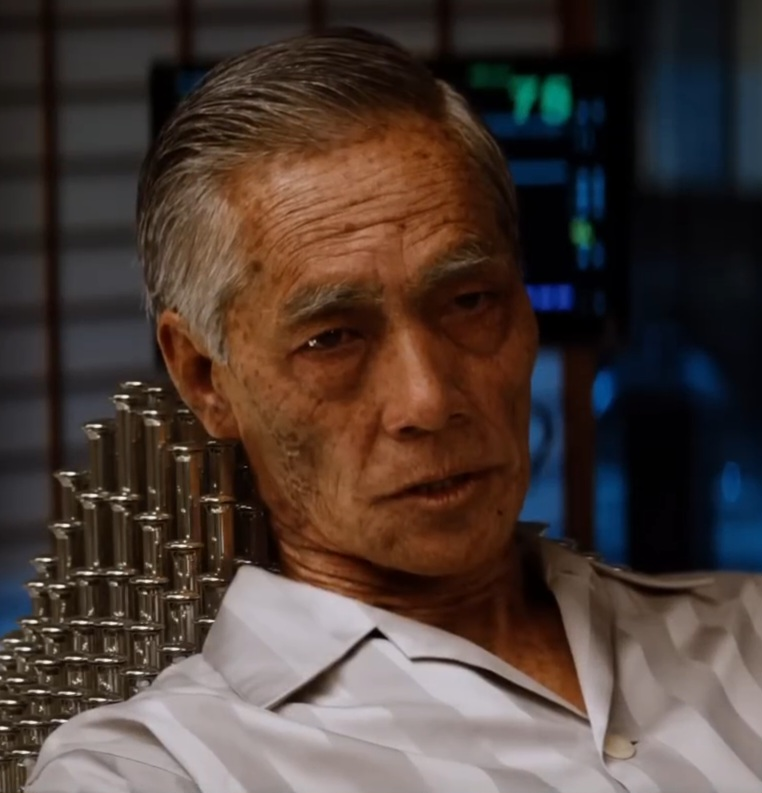
Ichirō Yashida, portrayed by Haruhiko Yamanouchi

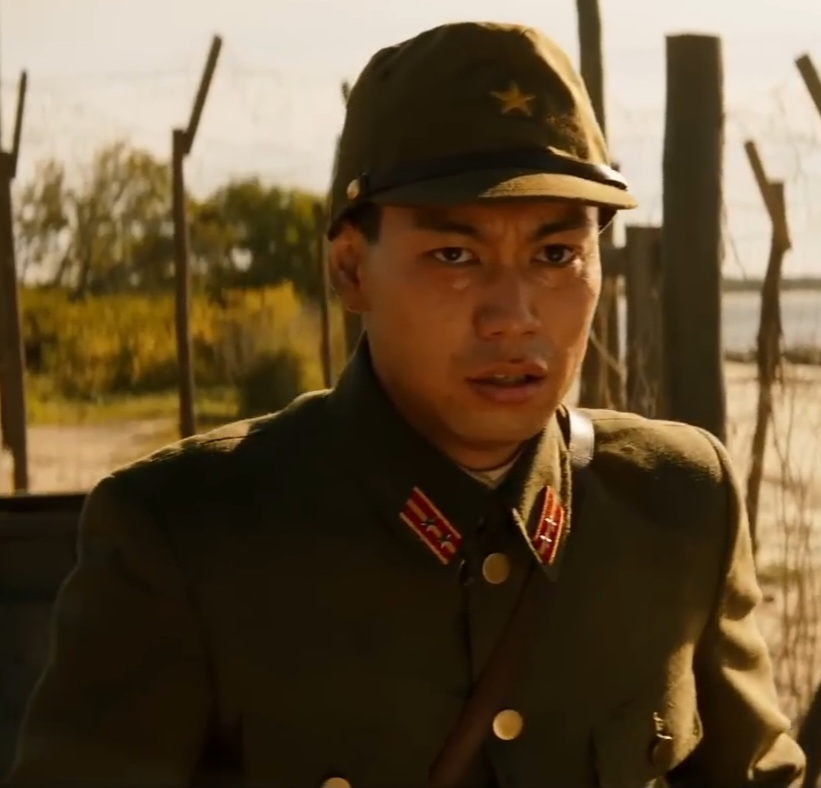
Ichirō Yashida as a young man, portrayed by Ken Yamamura

Ichirō Yashida / Silver Samurai (portrayed by Haruhiko Yamanouchi and Ken Yamamura as a young man) is the grandfather of Mariko, father of Shingen, and founder of the Yashida Corporation.

Yashida first met Logan during WW2, when Logan saved him during the bombing of Nagasaki. Years later, he seeks Logan out to harness his healing abilities. He fakes his death and dons the Silver Samurai suit, and attempts to take Logan's healing ability. He severs Wolverine's claws, which Mariko uses to kill him.

=== Shingen Yashida ===
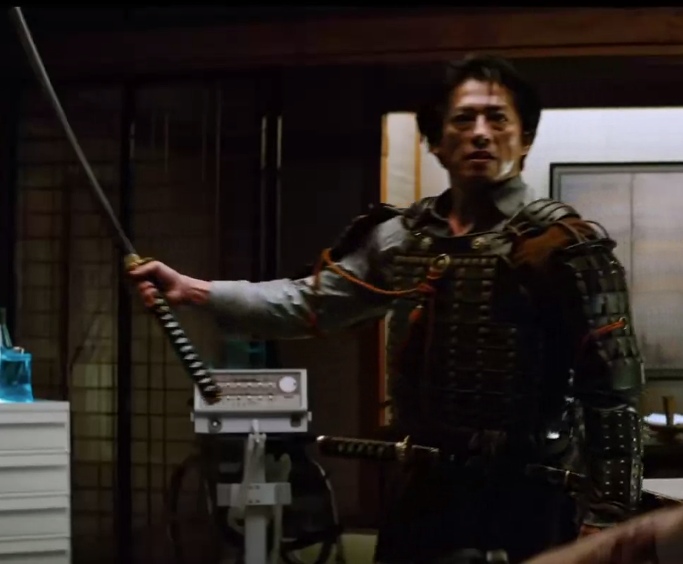
Shingen, as portrayed by Hiroyuki Sanada

Shingen Yashida (portrayed by Hiroyuki Sanada) is Mariko's father and Ichirō's son. He attempts to seize control of his father's company and kill Mariko and Wolverine, but is killed by the latter instead.

=== Harada ===
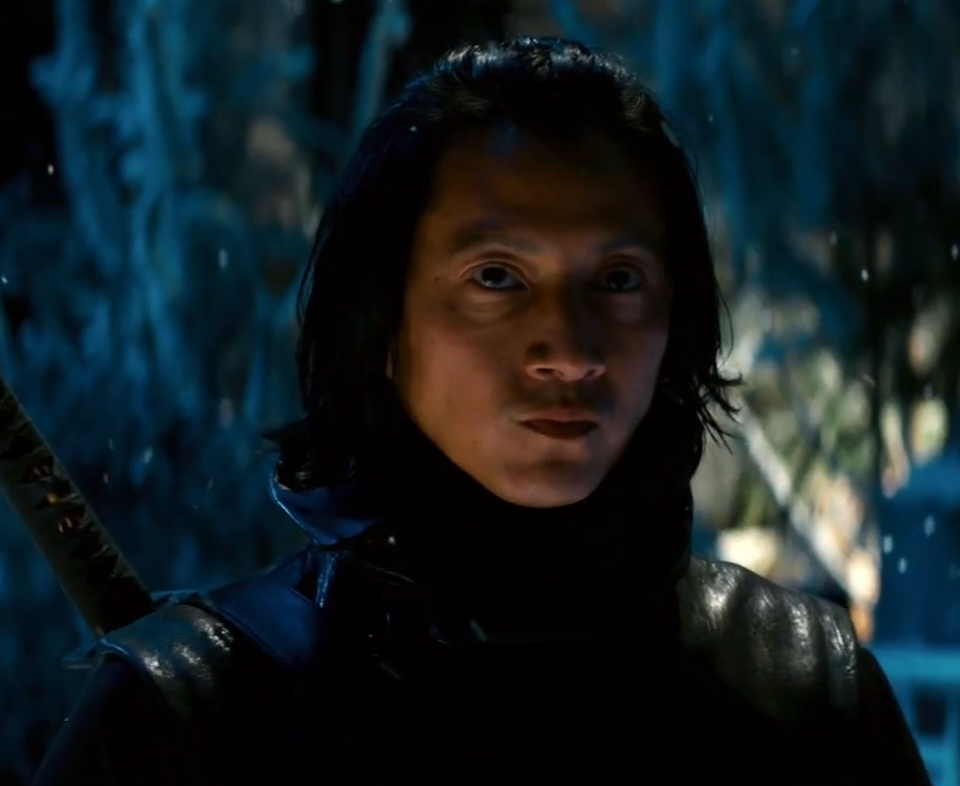
Harada, portrayed by Will Yun Lee

Harada (portrayed by Will Yun Lee) is Mariko's former lover and a member of the Yashida clan. He kidnaps Mariko for Viper, but has a change of heart and assists Wolverine. He is killed by the Silver Samurai.

=== Viper ===
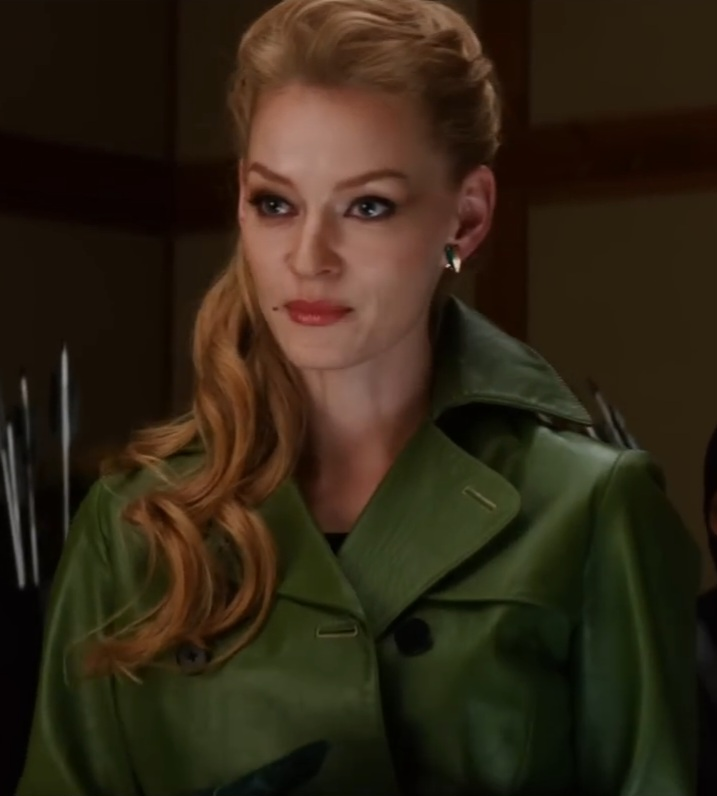
Viper, portrayed by Svetlana Khodchenkova

Viper (portrayed by Svetlana Khodchenkova) is a mutant with reptilian features such as fangs and the ability to shed her skin and expel toxins from her mouth.

Posing as the Yashida clan's physician, Viper poisons Logan in his sleep with a nanobot. Yukio kills Viper by breaking her neck with an elevator's counterweight.

== Introduced in X-Men: Days of Future Past (2014) ==
=== Bolivar Trask ===
Bolivar Trask (portrayed by Bill Duke in The Last Stand; Peter Dinklage in Days of Future Past) is the name of two characters. The first is the head of the Department of Homeland Security, and the other is the inventor behind the Sentinels.

Trask first appeared in The Last Stand as the head of the Department of Homeland Security.

Trask appeared in Days of Future Past as the scientist behind the Sentinel program and Trask Industries. In the original timeline, he is assassinated by Mystique at a press conference, leading to her capture and experimentation. This led to the further development of Sentinels and a push for the program, causing the apocalyptic future which serves as the setting for part of the film. His original death is prevented by the X-Men, and the next attempted assassination by Magneto is stopped by Mystique, who refuses to kill Trask.

=== Sentinels ===
Sentinels are mutant-hunting machines designed by Bolivar Trask. They are first hinted at during a Danger Room sequence in The Last Stand, before making a full appearance in Days of Future Past. By 2023, they had been developed with technology allowing them to mimic superhuman powers and shapeshift to combat mutant abilities.

Bolivar Trask created Sentinels, and Mark I is revealed in 1973. Trask's assassination by Mystique and her subsequent capture leads to the rollout of the Sentinel program and their further development with Mystique's DNA. Mark X, with adaptable forms and power mimicry, is introduced in 2013, and by 2023, Sentinels have enslaved or killed many mutants and humans alike, including a majority of the X-Men. They are opposed by the Free Mutants, and the timeline is reset, preventing Trask's assassination and Mystique's capture.

The Sentinels also appeared in X-Men: The Official Game.

=== Clarice Ferguson / Blink ===
Clarice Ferguson / Blink (portrayed by Fan Bingbing) is a mutant with purple hair, large green eyes, and the ability to open portals. She is one of the surviving mutants in the future.

Blink is a member of the Free Mutants, using her teleportation abilities to escape and fight Sentinels. She is killed in the final battle when Sentinels use her portals to stab her. This is undone with the timeline reset. In promotional material, she is shown freeing mutants from Sentinel camps.

=== James Proudstar / Warpath ===
James Proudstar / Warpath (portrayed by Booboo Stewart) is a mutant with enhanced strength, speed, and senses. He is one of the surviving mutants in the future.

Warpath is a part of the Free Mutants, but his head is blown off by a Sentinel's beam. Warpath's death is undone with the timeline reset.

=== Lucas Bishop / Bishop ===
Lucas Bishop / Bishop (portrayed by Omar Sy) is a mutant with the ability to harness and redirect energy, notably through his gun. He is one of the surviving mutants in the future.

Bishop is a member of the Free Mutants and is the first to be shown sent back in time by Kitty Pryde. He is killed in the final battle when Sentinels overload his body, causing him to explode. Bishop's death is undone with the timeline reset.

=== Roberto DaCosta / Sunspot ===
Roberto DaCosta / Sunspot (portrayed by Adan Canto in Days of Future Past and Henry Zaga in The New Mutants) is a mutant with the ability to project solar energy and flames, with enhanced strength and flight. He is one of the surviving mutants in the future.

Sunspot in Days of Future Past is a survivor of the Sentinels and a member of the Free Mutants. He is killed by three Sentinels in the final battle. Sunspot's death is undone with the timeline reset.

Sunspot appears as a main character in The New Mutants. A wealthy, Brazilian teenager, Sunspot is a patient of the Milbury Hospital after his mutant abilities caused him to burn his girlfriend. He fights the Demon Bear in the end with the others and leaves the compound.

=== En Sabhah Nur / Apocalypse ===
En Sabhah Nur / Apocalypse (portrayed by Brendan Pedder in Days of Future Past and Oscar Isaac in Apocalypse) is an ancient mutant with the ability to absorb, grant, and enhance mutants' powers, generate force fields and portals, absorb knowledge, and manipulate matter. He is set on mutant superiority over humanity, and was worshipped as a god in Ancient Egypt.

Apocalypse is first seen in the post-credit scene of Days of Future Past building a pyramid in Ancient Egypt with his powers. In the opening scene of Apocalypse, he is transferring his essence to a younger body while humans attempt to assassinate him. He is protected by his Horsemen, who all perish, and Apocalypse is entombed in rubble. Thousands of years later in 1983, he is awoken by worshippers and causes a worldwide tremor.

He gathers four new Horsemen: Storm, Psylocke, Archangel, and Magneto. He puts plans in motion to rebuild the world in his image, but is thwarted by the X-Men, and Storm and Magneto turn against him. He is killed by the combined force of Cyclops, Storm, and Jean.

The character was negatively received by viewers, as well as Oscar Isaac himself.

== Introduced in X-Men: Apocalypse (2016) ==
=== Caliban ===
Caliban (portrayed by Tómas Lemarquis in Apocalypse and Stephen Merchant in Logan) is a mutant with chalk-white skin and the ability to locate other mutants.

In Apocalypse, Caliban is an underground broker who tracks mutants for money. Psylocke was his bodyguard until recruited by Apocalypse.

In Logan, Caliban is a friend of Logan and Professor X in the future, who has a severe sensitivity to sunlight. He is abducted by the Reavers to track Wolverine, but ultimately kills himself with grenades.

== Introduced in Dark Phoenix (2019) ==
=== Vuk ===
Vuk (portrayed by Jessica Chastain) is a survivor of the D'Bari, an alien race whose planet was destroyed by the Phoenix Force. It tracks the Force to Earth, where it kills the human Margaret Smith and takes her form, alongside its fellow D'Bari taking other human forms, before tracking down the Phoenix within Jean Grey.

Vuk poses as an FBI agent and kills Jean's father, John Grey, for information on his daughter. Vuk locates and manipulates Jean Grey to take the Force from her, battling the X-Men and their allies alongside Jean. Jean allows some of the Force to transfer to Vuk, but ends up killing the D'Bari and overloading Vuk with the Force, killing them too.

=== Selene and Ariki ===
Selene and Ariki (portrayed by Kota Eberhardt and Andrew Stehlin) are mutant allies of Magneto at his Genosha compound. Selene has telepathy, while Ariki has trichokinesis. Both assist Magneto in the fight against the X-Men, are captured by the military, and die while fighting the D'Bari on the train.

Ariki is a character original to the film, but Stehlin was originally billed to play a character named Red Lotus.

== Introduced in Logan (2017) ==
=== Laura / X-23 ===
Laura / X-23 (portrayed by Dafne Keen) is the daughter of Wolverine, with two claws in each hand and a claw in each foot, and an advanced healing factor. She was created by Zander Rice of Alkali-Transigen using Wolverine's DNA implanted into a woman.

Introduced in Logan, X-23 is a vicious young mutant girl who spoke very little English but was fluent in Spanish. She is created to be a soldier, with claws coated in adamantium. After she and other child soldiers are scheduled for termination, the nurses in the program aid their escape, and the children seek Eden, a fictional sanctuary for mutants. The nurse Gabriela (Elizabeth Rodriguez) puts her under Logan's care, and the two, along with Xavier, set off.

Xavier is killed by X-24 along the way. The children and Laura are almost captured, but they kill all the Reavers; she shoots X-24 with an adamantium bullet after he fatally wounds Wolverine. She buries him and leaves with the other children to cross into Canada.

Laura is pruned and ends up in the Void, alongside Elektra, Blade, and Gambit, fighting against Cassandra Nova and her gang. She is freed from the Void after the defeat of Nova and allowed to live alongside Wolverine and Deadpool in a past timeline.

=== Donald Pierce ===
Donald Pierce (portrayed by Boyd Holbrook) is the cybernetically enhanced leader of the Reavers and head of Alkali-Transigen security. He tracked X-23, but is ultimately killed by the other children from the program.

=== Zander Rice ===
Zander Rice (portrayed by Richard E. Grant) is the lead scientist of Alkali-Transigen, and the man responsible for the near eradication of mutants and mutant weapons X-23 and X-24. Wolverine ultimately shoots and kills him.

=== X-24 ===
X-24 (portrayed by Hugh Jackman) is an aggressive clone of Wolverine developed by Alkali-Transigen. He is responsible for the death of Professor X and Logan. He is killed with an adamantium bullet shot by X-23.

=== Children ===
The children from the X-23 program have a variety of genetic sources, including Avalanche (Rictor).

== Introduced in Deadpool (2016) ==
=== Blind Al ===
Blind Al (portrayed by Leslie Uggams) is an elderly blind woman and the roommate of Deadpool. She appears in all three Deadpool films.

=== Weasel ===
Weasel (portrayed by T.J. Miller) is a bartender and close friend of Deadpool. He helps Deadpool recruit members for X-Force. He appears in the first two Deadpool films, but the character did not return for the third.

=== Vanessa Carlyle ===
Vanessa Carlyle (portrayed by Morena Baccarin) is the girlfriend of Deadpool. She worked as an escort when she first met Wade. He disappears after his cancer diagnosis due to his receiving the experimental treatment that mutated him, despite being engaged to her. Ajax and Angel Dust kidnap her to lure in Deadpool.

She is killed by drug dealer Sergei Valishnikov (Thayr Harris) in Deadpool 2, but is saved by Deadpool with Cable's time slider. She breaks up with Wade prior to the third film due to his failed superhero lifestyle. She is present at Wade's birthday party in Deadpool & Wolverine. She gets back together with Wade at the end of the film.

=== Dopinder ===
Dopinder (portrayed by Karan Soni) is a taxi driver and close friend of Deadpool who often drives him and his teammates to battles. He appears in all three Deadpool films, and is present at Wade's birthday.

=== Negasonic Teenage Warhead ===
Negasonic Teenage Warhead (portrayed by Brianna Hildebrand) is a young mutant with the ability to generate atomic bursts around her body. She is a member of the X-Men.

She defeats Angel Dust in the first film; in the second film, she enters a relationship with fellow X-Man Yukio and fights Juggernaut; and in the third, she attends Wade's birthday party.

=== Francis Freeman / Ajax ===
Francis Freeman / Ajax (portrayed by Ed Skrein) was a mutant immune to pain. He tortured Wade in the Workshop and was disfigured during Wade's escape. He kidnaps Vanessa and is later killed by Wade.

=== Angel Dust ===
Angel Dust (portrayed by Gina Carano) is a mutant with adrenaline-based strength and durability. She is a member of the Workshop, working under Ajax. She fights Colossus but is saved by him from the destruction of the carrier.

=== The Recruiter ===
The Recruiter (portrayed by Jed Rees) is a recruiter for Ajax, who encourages Wade to join Ajax's program under the guise of a cure for Wade's cancer. Deadpool refers to the character as "Agent Smith" because of the similarity to the character from The Matrix franchise.

== Introduced in Deadpool 2 (2018) ==
=== Nathan Summers / Cable ===
Nathan Summers / Cable (portrayed by Josh Brolin) is a cybernetic mutant from the future sent back in time to kill Rusty Collins.

Cable lives in an apocalyptic future as a soldier. Cable's wife (Hayley Sales) and daughter, Hope (Islie Hirvonen), are killed by Rusty Collins in the future, so he travels back in time to kill him. Deadpool and X-Force initially oppose him, but he later sides with them.

=== Domino ===
Domino (portrayed by Zazie Beetz) is a mutant with the ability of good luck. She joins X-Force and is the only hired member to survive.

=== Pete Wisdom ===
Pete Wisdom (portrayed by Rob Delaney) is a normal human man who joined X-Force. He dies to Zeitgeist's acidic vomit in X-Force's first mission, but is warned and saved by Wade through the use of time travel. He works alongside Wade in a car dealership in Deadpool & Wolverine and attends his birthday party. He is universally loved by the alternate variants of Deadpool.

=== Russell 'Rusty' Collins / Firefist ===
Russell 'Rusty' Collins / Firefist (portrayed by Julian Dennison as a child and Sala Baker as an adult) is a young pyrokinetic mutant from New Zealand. In Cable's future, he is a dangerous criminal who murdered Cable's wife and child.

Russell's criminal career begins when he murders the headmaster of the Essex school, a school he attended and was tortured at for being a mutant. Cable travels back in time to kill Russell, but Deadpool prevents the incident instead.

=== Shatterstar ===
Shatterstar (portrayed by Lewis Tan) is an extraterrestrial from Mojoworld who joins X-Force. He dies when he skydives into a moving helicopter blade. He is present in Deadpool & Wolverine at Wade's birthday, so it is presumed he was resurrected through time travel.

=== Bedlam ===
Bedlam (portrayed by Terry Crews) is a mutant with the ability to disrupt electrical currents. He dies when he skydives and is hit by a bus.

=== Vanisher ===
Vanisher (portrayed by Brad Pitt) is an invisible mutant who joins X-Force. He dies when he skydives into a powerline, temporarily making himself visible.

=== Zeitgeist ===
Zeitgeist (portrayed by Bill Skarsgård) is a mutant with the ability to expel acid from his mouth. He dies when skydiving into a woodchipper, in which he expels acid onto Pete Wisdom, killing him too.

== Introduced in The New Mutants (2020) ==
=== Danielle 'Dani' Moonstar ===
Danielle 'Dani' Moonstar (portrayed by Blu Hunt) is a young Native American mutant with the ability to conjure other people's fears and make them materialize.

When Dani's powers manifest, a demonic bear destroys her reservation, killing everyone in it. Dani is the sole survivor and is sent to Milbury Hospital. She begins a romantic relationship with Rahne and is antagonized by Illyana. While at the hospital, she subconsciously uses her abilities to bring the other patients' fears to life, not knowing of her own ability. She is set for euthanization by Dr. Reyes, but is saved by Rahne. She defeats the returned demon bear by harnessing her abilities, and leaves the hospital with the other patients.

=== Rahne Sinclair ===
Rahne Sinclair (portrayed by Maisie Williams) is a young Scottish mutant with the ability to turn into a wolf, as well as gain feral features while in human form, such as claws and fangs.

Rahne is from a religious village but was chased out due to her mutation. She ended up at Milbury Hospital and befriended Dani, even having a romantic relationship with her. She injures Dr. Reyes when she attempts to euthanize Dani. She helps defeat the demon bear and leaves the compound with the other patients.

=== Samuel Guthrie ===
Samuel Guthrie (portrayed by Charlie Heaton) is a young mutant from Kentucky with the ability to propel himself using thermo-chemical energy, allowing high-speed flight.

When Samuel's powers manifest, he accidentally kills his father and a group of miners that he was working with. He is sent to Milbury Hospital and escapes in the end after defeating Dr. Reyes and the demon bear.

=== Illyana Rasputin ===
Illyana Rasputin (portrayed by Anya Taylor-Joy, Colbi Gannett as a child) is a Russian mutant with the ability to open portals and wield magic, including the Soulsword. She is accompanied by Lockheed, a plush purple dragon she can bring to life.

Illyana is sold into child slavery, but uses her abilities to live in the fictional dimension of Limbo, which later becomes real. She murders her abusers and is sent to Milbury Hospital. She was very aggressive upon arrival. Dani's powers manifest Illyana's fears into the Smiley Men, monstrous creatures who often wear masks with smiley faces. Illyana manages to defeat them, along with the demon bear, and exits the hospital with the other patients.

=== Cecilia Reyes ===
Dr. Cecilia Reyes (portrayed by Alice Braga) is the sole medical professional at Milbury Hospital, and a mutant with the ability to generate force fields. She operates under the Essex Corporation to train young mutants to be personal killers.

She recruits five young mutants to the hospital and traps them using her powers to observe them. She is instructed to kill Dani by the Essex Corporation, but is wounded by Rahne. She confronts the young mutants, but is killed by the demon bear.

Rosario Dawson was initially set to portray the character, but left the production.

== Introduced in Deadpool & Wolverine (2024) ==
=== Cassandra Nova ===
Cassandra Nova (portrayed by Emma Corrin) is the sociopathic, British twin sister of Charles Xavier, who is pruned by the TVA and subsequently rules the Void with her gang of supervillain minions. She is an Omega-level mutant, with abilities including tactile-telepathy, telekinesis, phasing, and teleportation.

Nova is first seen when her gang brings her the captured Deadpool, Wolverine, and Human Torch (Chris Evans). She kills the latter, and the other two escape. They lead the remaining Resistance to her base, and subdue Nova with Juggernaut's helmet. She is shot by Pyro, causing Wolverine to take off the helmet to allow her to heal, as he thought Xavier would've wanted that. Nova allows the two to exit the Void to Deadpool's reality with a Sling ring. Nova follows them due to learning of Paradox's betrayal from Pyro. She kills Pyro and reads Paradox's mind, learning of the Time Ripper. She attempts to use the device to destroy all of reality, but Deadpool and Wolverine overload the device, atomizing Nova.

== Other characters ==
The Xavier Institute has multiple student cameos including Siryn, Artie Maddicks (Bryce Hodgson), Cypher (Nolan Gerard Funk), Stepford Cuckoos, Kid Omega, Match (Lamar Johnson), and Dazzler (Halston Sage). Ink (Gregg Lowe) and Daniels are mutant members of Havok's army squadron, with the powers to gain powers based on his tattoos and manipulate a person's balance, respectively. Apocalypse's original Horsemen - Death (Monique Ganderton), Pestilence, Famine, and War - all die at the beginning of Apocalypse. William Stryker's computer in X2 revealed a list of many mutant names, including characters who would later appear and those that never appeared.

Mystique impersonates Senator Kelly's assistant, Henry Peter Gyrich, in the first film. The franchise features three Presidents of the United States, played by Cotter Smith, Josef Sommer, and Brian d'Arcy James. In First Class, two high-ranking military personnel are coerced by the Hellfire Club: Colonel Robert Hendry (Glenn Morshower) and General Armivolkoff (Rade Serbedzija).

Quicksilver's mother and younger sister appear in Days of Future Past. Cyclops' and Havok's parents, Christopher and Katherine Summers, as well as Magneto's wife Magda (Carolina Bartczak) and daughter Nina Gurzsky, appear in Apocalypse. Wolverine's parents, Elizabeth Howlett and Thomas Logan (Aaron Jeffery), as well as his supposed father, John Howlett (Peter O'Brien), appear in X-Men Origins: Wolverine.

Marrow and Bob, Agent of Hydra, appear in Deadpool. Buck is a patron of the Sister Margaret's School for Wayward Children bar who appears in Deadpool and Deadpool & Wolverine. Deadpool 2 features Sluggo (Robert Maillet), Black Tom Cassidy (Jack Kesy), and Omega Red (Dakoda Shepley) as prisoners, Irene Merryweather as a reporter, and references to Alpha Flight and Madelyne Pryor. Elektra and Blade are residents of the Void as the Resistance, while Bullseye and the Russian are members of Cassandra Nova's gang. Other MCU characters, including members of the TVA and Happy Hogan (Jon Favreau), also appear, as well as the Deadpool Corps.

Stan Lee makes cameo appearances in X-Men, The Last Stand, Deadpool, and Apocalypse.

== Teams ==
- Brotherhood of Mutants: A group of villainous mutants led by Magneto. Members include Mystique, Sabretooth, Toad, and Pyro.
- Essex Corporation: An organization specializing in mutant genetics connected to Alkali-Transigen and the Milbury Hospital.
  - Alkali-Transigen: A scientific subsidiary of the Essex Corporation responsible for the near extinction of mutants in 2029.
    - Project X-23: A group of artificially created mutant children. They escape the corporation and flee to Canada.
    - Reavers: A group of cybernetically enhanced mercenaries working to capture the mutant children created by Alkali-Transigen. Led by Donald Pierce.
  - Essex House for Mutant Rehabilitation: A foster home for young mutants that uses brutal methods and is previously inhabited by Russell and Domino.
  - Milbury Hospital: A facility under the guise of a hospital to train and harness young mutants operated by Cecilia Reyes.
- Hellfire Club: A group of mutant supremacists led by Sebastian Shaw, consisting of Emma Frost, Azazel, and Riptide. They later recruit Angel Salvadore and Mystique, and Magneto takes over after killing Sebastian Shaw.
- Horsemen of Apocalypse: Four followers of Apocalypse. They were operational in Ancient Egypt before Apocalypse's disappearance. In the modern day, they consist of Magneto, Psylocke, Archangel, and Storm.
- New Mutants: A loose organization of the mutant subjects at the Milbury Hospital. Consists of Dani Moonstar, Magik, Wolfsbane, Sunspot, and Cannonball.
- The Omegas: A loosely led group of mutants who oppose the mutant cure.
- Weapon X: A government operation designed to induce superhuman abilities for government purposes. Scientists included Abraham Cornelius and Carol Frost, with government backing by General Munson and William Stryker.
  - Team X: A black-ops team of mercenaries led by William Stryker, consisting of Wolverine, Sabretooth, Agent Zero, Chris Bradley, Wraith, Blob, and Deadpool.
- X-Force: A short-lived group of mutants led by Deadpool on a covert mission, consisting of Deadpool, Domino, Bedlam, Shatterstar, Pete Wisdom, Vanisher, and Zeitgeist.
- X-Men: A team of mutant superheroes founded by Charles Xavier and Erik Lensherr.
  - Division X/First Class: The first iteration of the X-Men, consisting of Beast, Havok, Mystique, Banshee, Darwin, and Angel Salvadore. Darwin is killed before the first mission and Angel defects. Moira MacTaggert is also involved in creating this group.
  - Free Mutants: A group of mutants consisting of Professor X, Magneto, Wolverine, Storm, Iceman, Kitty Pryde, Colossus, Blink, Warpath, Bishop, Sunspot, and Rogue in the Sentinel-dominated future.
  - Xavier Institute: A school for mutants located in New York.
- Yashida Clan: A wealthy and powerful Japanese family, with Ichiro, Shingen, and Mariko Yashida as members.
  - Black Clan: A group of ninjas serving the Yashida clan, with Harada as a member.

== See also ==
- List of The Gifted characters
- List of Legion characters
- Characters of the Marvel Cinematic Universe
