= Cliff Park Ormiston Academy =

Location
- Kennedy Avenue; Gorleston-on-Sea Great Yarmouth, Norfolk, NR31 6TA; England; 52.5612°N 1.7237°E

Information
- Type: Academy
- Trust: Ormiston Academies Trust
- Department for Education URN: 140364 Tables
- Ofsted: Reports
- Principal: Harry French
- Gender: Coeducational
- Age: 11 to 16
- Enrolment: 812
- Website: www.cliffparkoa.co.uk

Cliff Park Ormiston Academy (formerly Cliff Park High School) is a coeducational secondary school with academy status, located in the Gorleston-on-Sea area of Great Yarmouth in the English county of Norfolk. The school educates children aged 11 to 16.

== History ==
Previously a foundation school, Cliff Park High School was put into special measures in 2012 following an unsatisfactory Ofsted inspection report. The school exited special measures in 2013 and converted to academy status in January 2014, sponsored by the Ormiston Academies Trust. The most recent Ofsted inspection in October 2022, graded the academy as 'Requires Improvement'. Previously, it had received a judgment of 'Good'.

== Academic results ==
In 2016, the academy's Progress 8 score for GCSE results was 0.37, which is above the average Progress 8 for schools in England. 58% of students achieved grades A*-C / 9–4 in GCSE English and Maths.

== Notable former pupils ==
The classical and pop musician, media personality and model Myleene Klass attended the school in the 1990s before becoming a member of the band Hear'Say.

- Gregg Lowe, actor in the X-Men films
- Simon James Kippen, known as Kip Sabian, a professional wrestler, currently signed to All Elite Wrestling (AEW).
