= BBQ Champ =

British reality TV series

- Genre: Reality
- Presented by: Myleene Klass
- Judges: Adam Richman; Mark Blatchford
- Music by: Dan McGrath & Josh Phillips
- Country of origin: United Kingdom
- Original language: English
- No. of series: 1
- No. of episodes: 5

Production
- Running time: 45-47 minutes
- Production companies: Whizz Kid Entertainment (eOne) and County of Kings

Original release
- Network: ITV
- Release: 31 July – 28 August 2015

BBQ Champ is a British reality television series that first aired on 31 July 2015 and ended on 28 August 2015 on ITV. The show was presented by Myleene Klass and starred judges Mark Blatchford and Adam Richman.

== Premise ==
The aim of the programme was to find the best amateur barbecuer, with the help of the judges. The winner received a prize of £25,000. At the end of each episode, two contestants who had least impressed the judges enough had to face each other in a grill–off. The judges' favourite contestant in the grill–off advanced to the next episode, whilst the other was eliminated from the competition.

== Contestants ==
Name	Age	Occupation	Status
Kuldip Singh Sahota	33	Chilli sauce business owner	Eliminated 1st on 31 July 2015
Solomon Smith	29	Youth worker	Eliminated 2nd on 7 August 2015
Gary Thomasson	46	Full time carer	Eliminated 3rd on 14 August 2015
Nicola Fitzpatrick	36	Secretary	Eliminated 4th on 21 August 2015
Duncan Meyers	29	IT consultant	Eliminated 5th on 28 August 2015
Tony Smith	38	Photographer (now chef)	Third Place on 28 August 2015
Emma Millest	32	Admin assistant	Runner-up on 28 August 2015
Simon Dyer	52	Farm owner	Winner on 28 August 2015

== Ratings ==
Official episode viewing figures are from BARB.

Episode no.	Airdate	Viewers (millions)	ITV weekly ranking
1	31 July 2015	2.32	21
2	7 August 2015	1.77	30
3	14 August 2015	—N/a	—N/a
4	21 August 2015	—N/a	—N/a
5	28 August 2015	—N/a	—N/a

== Reception ==
Sam Wollaston writing for The Guardian described it as "Basically the Great British BBQ-Off, with Klass playing the Mel & Sue role (fewer puns, posher frocks), Richman and Blathford as Paul Hollywood and Mary Berry, and the setting outdoors. In the meantime, Great British Bake Off starts next week. I don’t think it has much to worry about from this." Ben Travis for the Evening Standard made similar comments: "The show might as well be called The Great British BBQ-Off for all that it poaches from the BBC’s winning culinary formula. There’s a reason that formula works though, and while BBQ Champ isn’t as unexpectedly gripping as the Beeb’s quaint baking contest, the first episode proves enjoyable viewing."

In September 2015 ITV stated they had no future plans for a second series, after the programmes failed to come close to matching the viewing figures of the rival BBC programme, among the negative reviews received from the critics.
