= Myleene Klass =

British musician and television presenter (born 1978)

Myleene Klass MBE
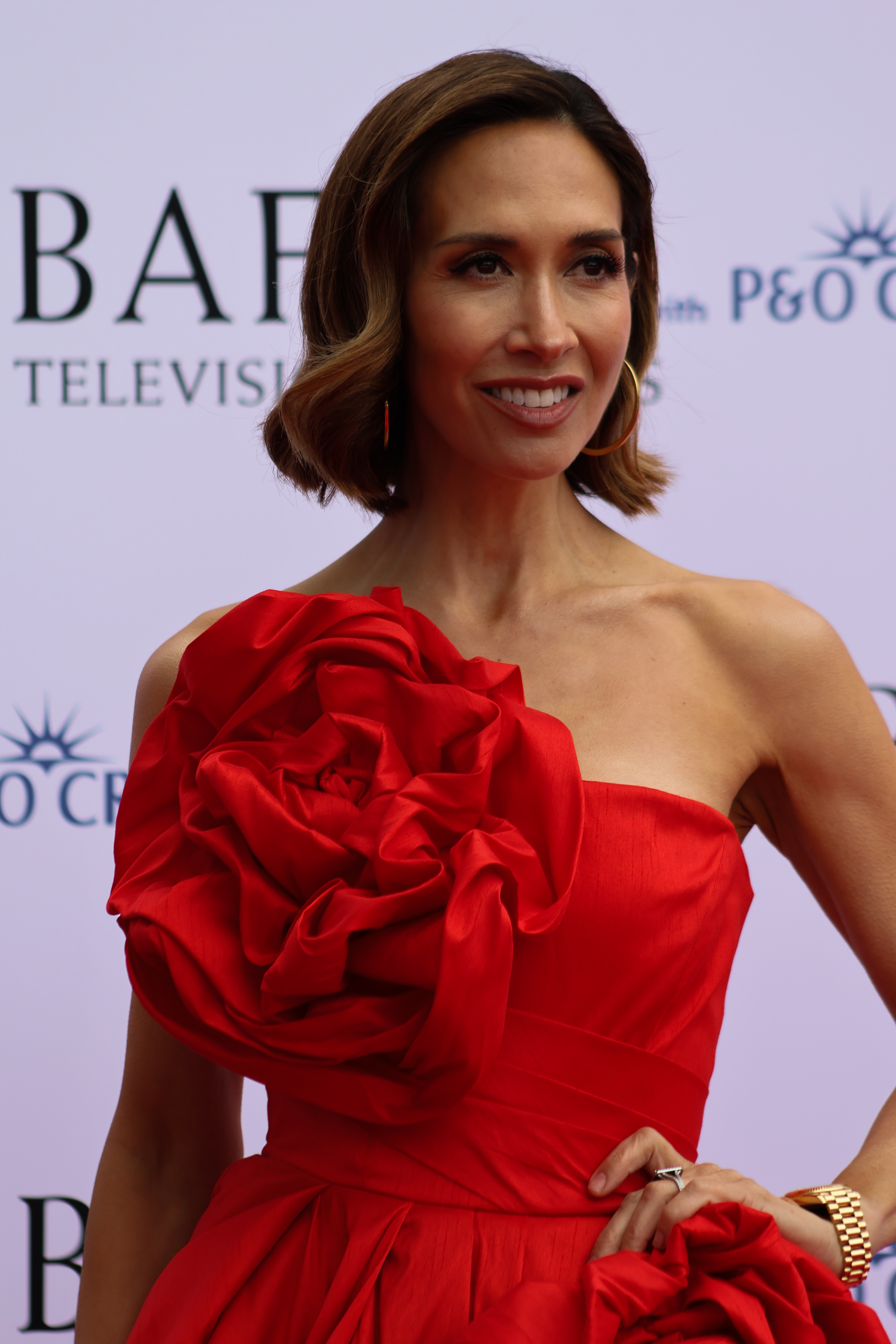
- Klass at the 2026 British Academy Television Awards in London, England
- Born: Myleene Angela Klass; 6 April 1978 (age 48); Great Yarmouth, Norfolk, England
- Education: St Mary and St Peter Catholic Primary School; Notre Dame High School; Cliff Park High School; East Coast College - (Great Yarmouth Campus); Guildhall School of Music and Drama; Royal Academy of Music
- Occupations: Singer; presenter; musician; model
- Years active: 2000–present
- Spouse: Graham Quinn (m. 2011; div. 2013)
- Partner: Simon Motson
- Children: 3
- Musical career
- Genres: Pop; classical crossover
- Instruments: Vocals; piano
- Label: EMI Classics
- Formerly of: Hear'Say
- Website: myleeneklass.co.uk

Myleene Angela Klass MBE (born 6 April 1978) is a British musician, singer, television presenter, model, writer and designer. She was a member of the pop group Hear'Say, and later released a solo classical crossover album in 2003, followed by additional "lullaby" albums from 2022 onward. Klass then went into television and radio presenting, hosting series including Popstar to Operastar (2010–2011) and BBQ Champ (2015) on ITV and The One Show (2007) on BBC One. She was a regular panellist on the ITV lunchtime chat show Loose Women in 2014 and again from 2024 onwards. In 2006, Klass was runner-up on the sixth series of I'm a Celebrity...Get Me Out of Here!, and returned in 2023 for the "all-stars" series I'm a Celebrity... South Africa, which she won.

== Early life and education ==
Myleene Angela Klass was born on 6 April 1978 in Great Yarmouth, Norfolk, to an Austrian father and a Filipino mother.

She attended Notre Dame High School, Norwich, but transferred to the closer Cliff Park High School in the Gorleston-on-Sea area of Great Yarmouth, to complete her secondary education.

Klass learned to play violin and piano as a child, and at the age of 15 she went to weekend studies at the Junior Department of the Guildhall School of Music and Drama, where she studied voice and harp. She gained A grades at A-Level, including music. She subsequently took a course at the Royal Academy of Music, University of London. At the age of 11, she won a school engineering contest, with a prize presented by Carol Vorderman.

== Music career ==
After graduating, Klass spent a short period as part of a reality show for Bravo, called The Dolls' House. She sang backing vocals for Cliff Richard, with whom she had previously worked at the age of 10 when she sang in a choir featured in his 1988 single "Mistletoe and Wine", which was that year's Christmas number one on the UK singles chart, and made her West End theatre debut in Miss Saigon.

Early television work came in 1998, when Klass sang soprano for the music of the Channel 4 film Alice through the Looking Glass.

=== Hear'Say ===
In 2001, Klass auditioned for the ITV reality show Popstars, which offered contestants an opportunity to become part of a newly formed pop band. Klass was chosen as one of the ten finalists and became a member of Hear'Say, with Kym Marsh, Suzanne Shaw, Danny Foster and Noel Sullivan. Following the success of their first album, the band was given its own TV show entitled Hear'Say It's Saturday. During the show's run, the band had a chance to perform with such established artists as Lionel Richie, Celine Dion, Bradley Walsh, Blue and Atomic Kitten. At the end of 2001, Hear'Say appeared on the Royal Variety Performance.

The group undertook a 37-date sold-out arena tour and performed numerous television guest appearances. Klass made many appearances with Hear'Say on TV and in live performances during 2002. The pop act's many promotional appearances during the year were also broadcast as part of their own TV shows, entitled Hear'Say: A New Chapter in Full and The Hear'Say Story. In total, Hear'Say had four Top 10 singles including two number-ones in the British charts, before splitting up after a reported long-term feud between Klass and Marsh. The feud resulted in Marsh leaving the band in December 2001, to be replaced by Johnny Shentall in 2002. The band split up in October of that year.

=== Solo artist ===
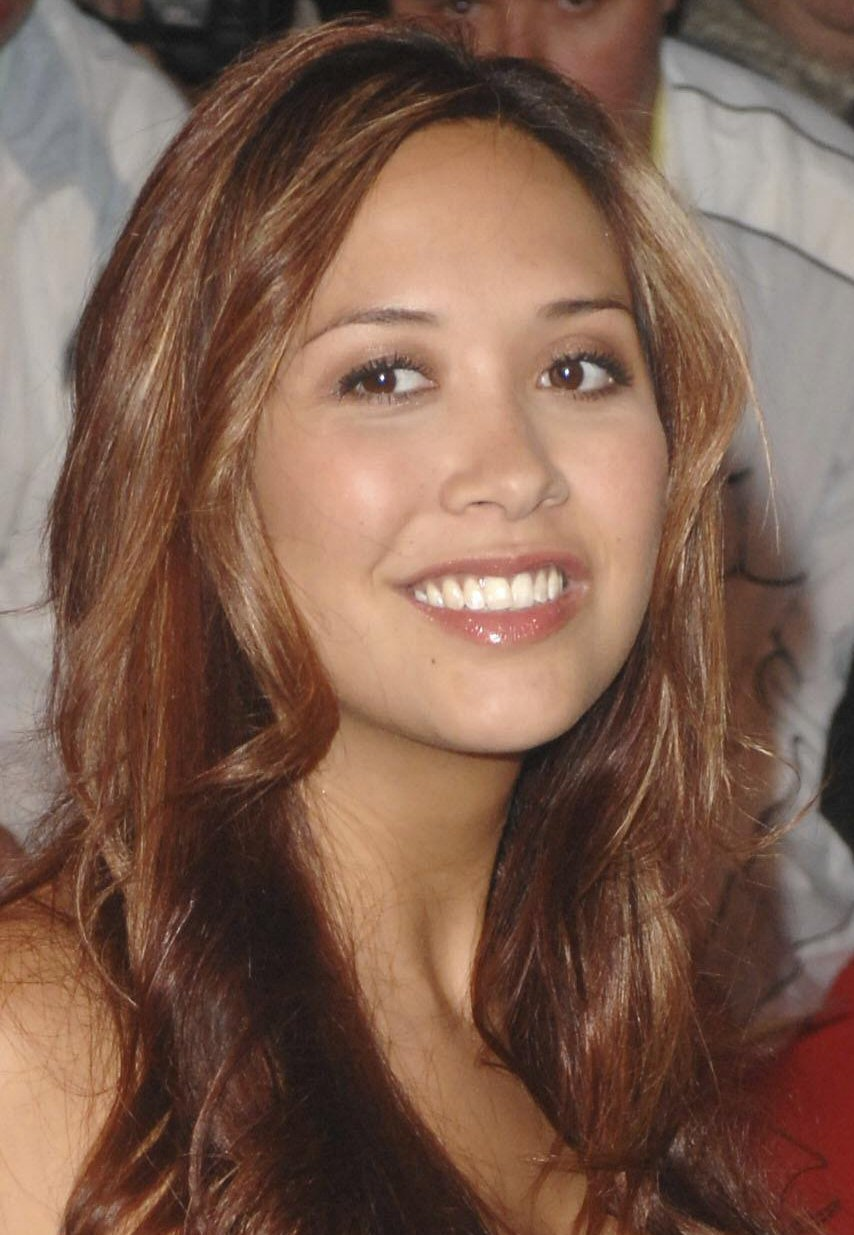
Klass attending the Greatest Britons Awards in May 2007

On 13 May 2003, Klass signed a five-album deal with Classics and Jazz. Promotion started with the release of the main promotional single "Toccata and Fugue" to TV channels. She also appeared in the video for "Da Ya Think I'm Sexy?" with the Girls of FHM, which went to No. 10 in the UK singles chart.

Klass's album, Moving On, was launched on 20 October 2003 at Harrods, London. The album included reworked versions of popular classical pieces such as Fauré's Pavane, Beethoven's Moonlight Sonata and Satie's Gymnopedie No.2. Moving On also included music from the Oscar-winning films Gladiator and The Piano. New arrangements for piano of more contemporary works were also included on the album, namely Linkin Park's "Crawling" and Daniel Bedingfield's "If You're Not the One". In its first week of release. Moving On peaked at No. 2 in the UK Classical Charts, behind Hayley Westenra. It peaked at No. 32 in the UK Albums Chart. By mid-December 2003, the album had been certified gold. In April 2004, Moving On was nominated as "Album of the Year" at the Classical BRIT Awards, but lost to Bryn Terfel's platinum-selling record Bryn.

Klass confirmed there would be a re-release of the album with five new tracks, but its release was pushed back. Ultimately, the release was cancelled, the only remnant being the Asian release of Moving On, which includes three new tracks: "Trouble" (a Coldplay cover, for which she also recorded vocals), "Sahara" and "Le Onde".

On 28 March 2007, Klass signed a record contract with EMI Classics as both a recording artist and an ambassador for the EMI Classics UK roster of artists. These include Alfie Boe, Natasha Marsh and Natalie Clein. The deal included the release of a series of albums on which Klass performed two exclusive tracks and chose a number of her favourite classical pieces from the EMI Classics back catalogue.

Klass's second album in the EMI series, Myleene's Music for Mothers, was released on 18 February 2008, and has two tracks played by Klass. These two tracks are the popular "America" from West Side Story, written by Leonard Bernstein, and Ennio Morricone's "Chi Mai", known best as the theme to the 1981 BBC TV drama serial The Life and Times of Lloyd George. In March 2013, she helped to celebrate Andrew Lloyd Webber's 40-year work with her rendition of "Shakalaka- Baby" from the musical Bombay Dreams.

== Television career ==
=== Presenting ===
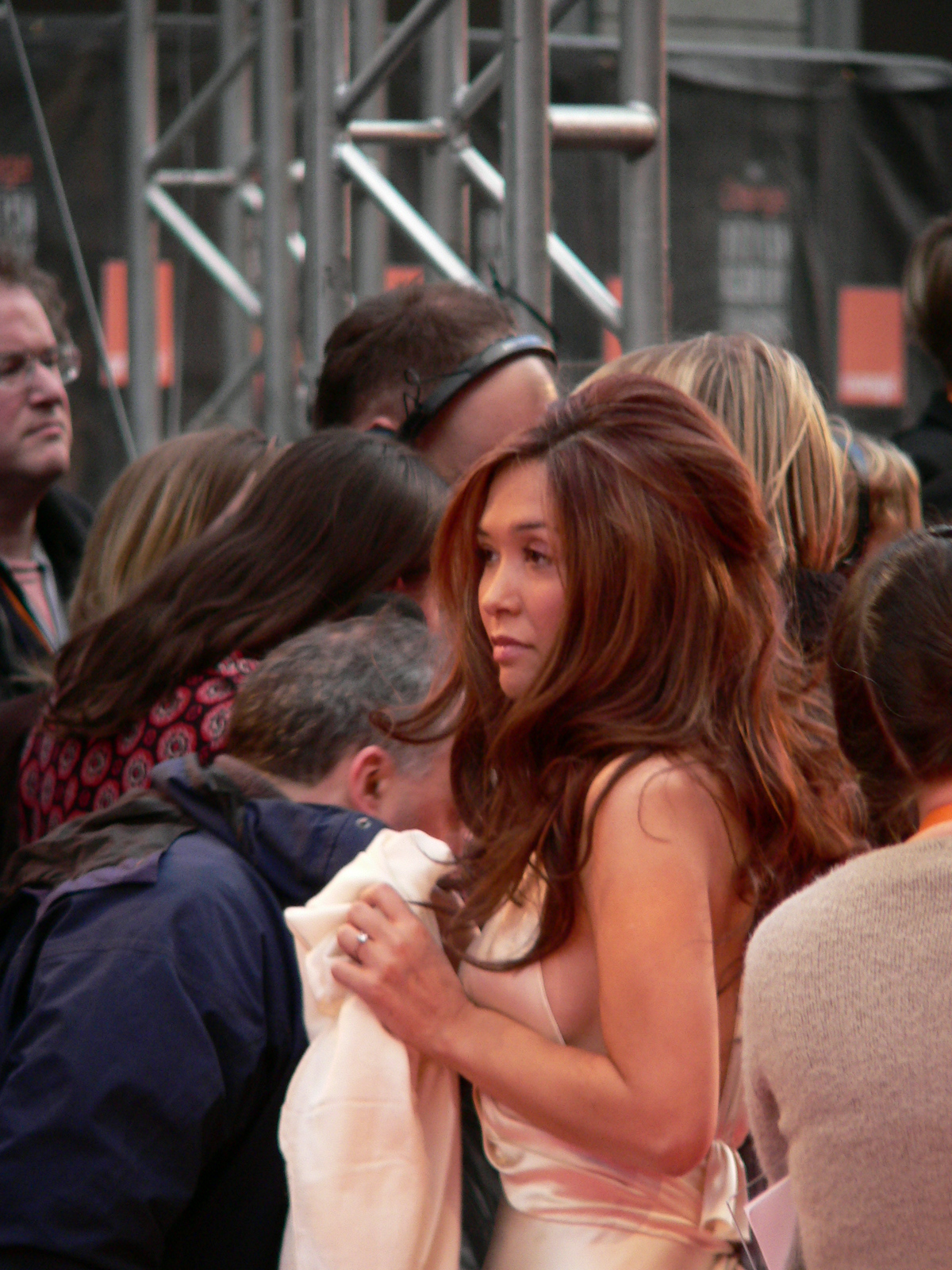
Klass attending the 2007 British Academy Television Awards in May 2007

In August 2005, Klass was signed as a presenter for the ITV music show CD:UK with Lauren Laverne and Johny P, with her first appearance shown on 17 September 2005. In 2005, Klass appeared as a guest panellist on the topical discussion show The Wright Stuff on a number of occasions. At Christmas 2005, Klass appeared on a celebrity version of the BBC's quiz show Mastermind.

On 6 August 2006, Klass was a guest reporter on BBC One's Sunday morning religion and ethics show Heaven & Earth, with Gloria Hunniford. Klass's report, billed as the feature of the week, was on the Pope's astronomer. From 10 October 2006, Klass co-presented Living's Ghost Towns with the medium and ex-Most Haunted star Derek Acorah. In May 2007, Klass appeared on Sky HD's test card.

On 9 July 2007, Klass began co-presenting the daily BBC One programme The One Show with Adrian Chiles. Her final broadcast was on 15 August 2007, she went into labour that night and gave birth to her daughter three weeks early the following day. On 19 October 2007, it was announced she would not be returning to the programme. On 31 December 2007, Klass presented the BBC One programme New Year Live for the countdown to the year 2008 at midnight.

Klass was announced as the new presenter of the Channel 4 series 10 Years Younger, replacing Nicky Hambleton-Jones, on 5 November 2008, and first hosted on 5 February the following year. She also co-hosted the American version of I'm a Celebrity... Get Me out of Here! in 2009 on NBC.

On 31 July 2015, Klass began presenting the new ITV series BBQ Champ.

=== Reality television ===
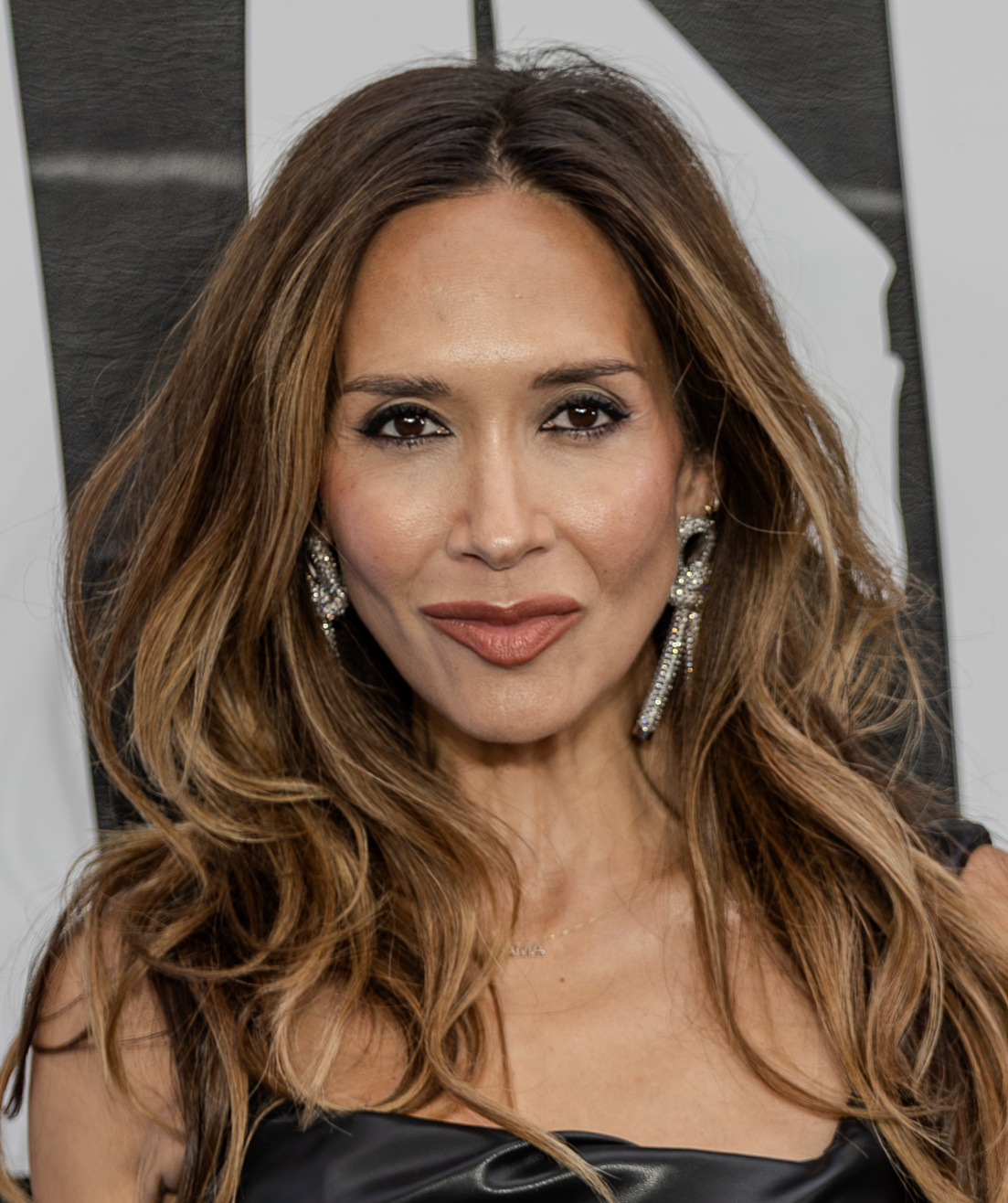
Klass in 2025

Klass took part in the sixth series of ITV's reality television series I'm a Celebrity...Get Me Out of Here!, which began on 13 November 2006 and ended on 1 December 2006. After only one week on I'm a Celebrity..., Klass became the most searched for celebrity from the show on the Internet search engine MSN/Live Search and the third most searched for celebrity in the UK. She finished in second place, behind Matt Willis.

Klass's brother Don, noticing his sister's popularity with the male audience, suggested she auction off her bikinis from the show on eBay. Within a week of leaving the jungle, Klass took his advice and put her white bikini from the show on auction on eBay until 7 December 2006. Klass pledged that all the money raised from the auction would go to charity to help victims of the Farepak savings scandal. The auction raised £7,500. Klass's newly found sex symbol status was cemented further after Playboy offered her a six-figure deal to pose nude for the magazine. The offer was sent to Klass's agent while she was still on the show, with many offers from other magazines, chat shows and TV work. The demand for Klass increased so much that it is estimated she received offers amounting to several million pounds. Returning to the UK, Klass did several TV and press interviews about her time on the show. Commenting on her famous showers, she said she never expected it to be such a focus of attention and that the reason for her frequent cold showers was to help cope with her sexual frustration, saying, "Forget snakes and spiders – going without sex was the hardest thing." She revealed that so great was her frustration and sexual urges after nearly three weeks without sex, that on her release from the jungle, she spent the first hours having unprotected sex with her boyfriend which resulted in her pregnancy with her first child. She also tried to end the widespread debate about whether or not her breasts are real, saying, "They're absolutely real and natural, I can assure you."

On 20 September 2020, it was announced that Klass would be a contestant on the thirteenth series of Dancing on Ice. She was paired with Łukasz Różycki. She became the first celebrity to be eliminated following a skate-off against Lady Leshurr and Brendyn Hatfield.

On 26 March 2023, it was announced that she would appear in I'm a Celebrity... South Africa. During the final episode aired on 12 May, Klass beat runner-up Jordan Banjo and was crowned the first "I'm a Celebrity Legend".

On 13 October 2023, Klass appeared as a guest panellist on the ITV talk show Loose Women before returning once again as a regular panellist from 19 January 2024.

=== Political intervention ===
In November 2014, Klass caused controversy by engaging in a heated debate with then-leader of the Labour Party Ed Miliband on the ITV show The Agenda. Discussing his proposals for a so-called "mansion tax" on larger homes, Klass expressed the view that this would hit "little grannies". In the course of discussion, she pointed to a glass of water, saying, "You can't just point at things and tax them." The row later featured in an attack on Miliband by the prime minister David Cameron at Prime Minister's Questions.

== Radio ==
In February 2006, Klass began presenting the Sunday Breakfast programme on Classic FM, taking over from Aled Jones (who returned to this slot in 2016). She worked for several years on the station's early morning show on Saturdays and Sundays and since 2006 presents the Friday and Saturday evening Calm Classics programme (10 pm – 1 am), and celebrated her 20th anniversary on the show in 2026. While working on the weekend morning show for Classic FM, she was also heard on London's Capital Radio on Sunday evenings from 8 to 10 pm. This show was also broadcast on GCap Media's One Network local commercial radio stations around the UK.

On 27 May 2008, Klass presented the BBC Radio 2 show Friday Night is Music Night in front of a live audience at the Watford Colosseum in Watford, Hertfordshire. The recording of this show was broadcast on 18 July 2008. Klass presented various shows on TalkRADIO, filling in for James Whale and Jon Gaunt.

Klass began presenting a Saturday drive-time show on Smooth Radio in 2014.

== Modelling ==
She appeared in a shoot for Maxim magazine in February 2006. Klass was chosen as the new face of Ortak Jewellery. In January 2007, it was announced that Klass had signed a multimillion-pound deal with Marks & Spencer to model clothes and swimwear. From 2012, Klass modelled for the catalogue store Littlewoods.

== Miscellaneous work ==
In early 2006, Klass was cast as one of the three women starring in the long-running play The Vagina Monologues and performed in Bromley, Richmond and Brighton. Her run was then extended to include all dates in Nottingham. Olympic champions joined Klass on 13 December 2006 to launch Lucky Dog, a new London 2012 National Lottery scratchcard. In 2008, Klass began designing a range of baby clothes for Mothercare called Baby K. Klass also writes a regular blog for the pregnancy and parenting website Gurgle, which is owned by Mothercare. Klass is the official godmother of the cruise ship Carnival Splendor. Klass is an EDF Energy / Team Green Britain Ambassador and took part in the launch of the EDF London Eye on 27 January 2011. In 2011, Klass began working with the children's shoe brand Start-rite, helping the company to design and promote a range of fitted footwear.

== Personal life ==
Klass has been an amateur astronomer for most of her life, having been taught the basics by her father. She was one of a handful of celebrities, engineers and scientists who were at the UK National Space Centre control centre for the touchdown of the UK Mars probe Beagle 2 in the early morning of Christmas Day 2003. Since then, she has been a keen supporter of the UK's work in the European space programme. In March 2006, Klass publicly criticised the proposed closure of the London Planetarium and explained on television how to view Venus in the early morning. She also appeared on Channel 4's Richard & Judy to discuss the book Moondust, which follows the lives of the first men on the moon, and in 2007 attended the televised party on BBC One, held at the home of Patrick Moore in Selsey to mark the 50th anniversary of Moore's monthly programme, The Sky at Night. Klass once studied astronomy with the Open University.

In December 2005, Klass was attacked by a group of teenagers in a newsagent in Bermondsey. She had a bag of chips dropped on her head and was pushed to the ground. The teenagers attempted to take photos of Klass on their mobile phones.

In May 2006, Klass was involved in a go-karting crash at a charity race in Cardiff, South Wales, sustaining an injury to her leg.

On 1 April 2007, she announced she was expecting her first child on 7 September. As a result, she delayed her wedding to her partner Graham Quinn, a former security consultant who was working as a bodyguard for her pop group Hear'Say when they met in 2001. The couple had become engaged in March 2006. Their daughter was born on 16 August 2007. Klass's spokesman said, "Myleene presented The One Show and felt a bit weird on the way home. She went to the hospital to get checked out and they told her she was in labour." Klass published a book about her experiences of being pregnant, entitled My Bump and Me: From Morning Sickness to Motherhood – An Honest Diary of My Pregnancy. She gave birth to a second daughter on 25 March 2011.

In May 2009, Klass had a net worth of £7.5 million.

In January 2010, Klass claimed she received a warning from Hertfordshire Police for brandishing a kitchen knife (through a window) at a group of teenagers who entered her garden while she and her daughter were alone in the house. She said that she was "utterly terrified" and "aghast" at the response by the police. Hertfordshire Police denied making any such warning and stated that the law allows householders the proportionate use of force to protect themselves. It has subsequently been reported that it was Klass's agent or publicist who notified the police of the incident and who then passed on the story to The Sun.

On 21 October 2011, Klass and Quinn married at the Cathedral Church of St John the Baptist, Norwich. However, the couple separated six months later on 6 April 2012, which was Klass's 34th birthday. On 23 April 2013, she was granted a divorce from Quinn.

In 2015, Klass began a relationship with fashion PR executive Simon Motson after being set up on a blind date. On 1 August 2019, she gave birth to her third child, a son. This was Klass's first child with Motson, who also has two children from a previous relationship. On 13 September 2020, Klass announced that she and Motson had become engaged; Motson had proposed in August on the fifth anniversary of their first date.

Klass has lived in Golders Green, north London, since moving to the area in late 2014.

== Charity work ==
As part of World Vision's 24-hour famine appeal, Klass visited Sierra Leone to see how World Vision was working to help villagers build up their lives. She has also been the face of various charity campaigns such as stop text bully and ChildLine, and helped aid the Niger famine appeal by manning the telephone lines.

At the Cathedral Church of St John the Baptist, Norwich on 24 June 2005, Klass performed a selection of tracks from her Moving On album, as well as accompanying some local schoolchildren in a concert of classical standards. The cathedral summer concert was organised to raise funds for an extension of the church building. Part of this performance was recorded by MTV, which was following Klass at the time for a show called The Price of Fame. The programme was later broadcast by VH1 and also by ITV, where it was only shown in the London region. The recording by the music channel was acknowledged by Klass during the evening.

On 15 July 2006, as part of BBC One's Sport Relief charity spectacular, Klass appeared as a special guest in the Question of Sport Relief segment. Klass's appearance involved her playing a variety of TV sport theme tunes on a grand piano. This part of the fundraiser was based on the BBC's popular A Question of Sport quiz show and was hosted by Sue Barker. Guest panellists on the show included Nancy Dell'Olio and Zara Phillips, who played alongside the regular team captains Ally McCoist and Matt Dawson.

During December 2006, Klass also appeared on The Big Finish with Graham Norton, in which she competed alongside Bill Oddie and Big Brother star Nikki Grahame for the "Showbiz" team (against "Soap", "Sport", "News" and "Judges" teams) to compete to win £10,000 for the winning team's chosen charities. The Showbiz team, represented by Norton in the final round, was beaten by the Soap team represented by the former EastEnders actress Wendy Richard. In November 2007, Klass guest-presented the BBC's Children in Need and performed "Your Song" with John Barrowman. She also collaborates with Norwood, a Jewish charity for children.

In July 2022, Klass received an honorary degree from the University of East Anglia.

In 2023, she backed changes to the Women's Health Strategy for women who have experienced miscarriage with MP Olivia Blake.

Klass is an ambassador for the National Foundation for Youth Music, a children's music charity.

Klass was appointed a Member of the Order of the British Empire (MBE) in the 2025 New Year Honours for her work on women's health, in particular in raising awareness of miscarriage.

Klass is a celebrity ambassador for St John Ambulance, the largest first aid charity in the UK. The charity announced the partnership in a press release in March 2024. Klass and her children were both trained in First Aid by the charity, with Klass stating that she's used the training when, on separate occasions, both her daughters have choked.

== Filmography ==
Television

Year	Title	Role	Notes
2005–2006	CD:UK	Co-presenter	
2006	The All Star Talent Show	Co-presenter	
2006	I'm a Celebrity...Get Me Out of Here!	Contestant	Finished 2nd place
2006–2007, 2009	New Year Live	Presenter	3 occasions
2006–2013	The National Lottery Draws	Presenter	In-rotation with other presenters
2007	The One Show	Co-presenter	With Adrian Chiles
2008	Last Choir Standing	Co-presenter	
2008	Tom Jones: One Night Only	Presenter	One-off episode
2008	Teaching Awards	Co-presenter	With Jeremy Vine
2008–2013, 2018	Classic Brit Awards	Presenter (2008–2013); Co-presenter (2018)	7 occasions
2009	I'm a Celebrity...Get Me Out of Here! USA	Co-presenter	Series 2
2010	GMTV with Lorraine	Guest presenter	4 episodes
2010–2011	Popstar to Operastar	Presenter	2 series; with Alan Titchmarsh (Series 1)
2010–2011	Escape from Scorpion Island	Co-presenter	Series 4 and series 5
2010, 2012	Lorraine	Guest presenter	2 episodes
2011	The National Lottery Awards	Presenter	One-off episode
2012	Celebrity Antiques Road Trip	Contestant (Episode 2.19)	One-off episode
2013	The Great Christmas Toy Giveaway	Co-presenter	One-off episode
2013, 2014, 2015, 2016	Countdown	Guest	21 episodes
2014, 2023, 2024–present	Loose Women	Regular panellist (2014, 2024–present), Guest panellist (2023)	36 episodes
2015	BBQ Champ	Presenter	1 series
2015	Blitz Cities	Presenter	1 episode
2016	Myleene Klass: Single Mums on Benefits	Presenter	One-off episode
2016	Matron, Medicine and Me: 70 Years of the NHS	Presenter	1 episode
2018 – 2020	Global Awards	Co-presenter	Music awards ceremony
2021	Dancing on Ice	Contestant	Series 13
2021	Myleene Klass: Miscarriage & Me	Presenter	Documentary
2023	I'm a Celebrity... South Africa	Contestant	Winner
2023	Musical Masterpieces	Co-presenter	Alongside Errollyn Wallen

=== Guest appearances ===
- Never Mind the Buzzcocks (2001, 2003, 2005, 2007)
- Shooting Stars (2002)
- Would I Lie to You? (2007)
- Hider in the House (2007)
- Al Murray's Happy Hour (2007)
- The Apprentice (2008)
- Celebrity Juice (2011, 2013, 2016)
- Born to Shine (2011)
- Countdown (2014, 2021)
- Draw It! (2014)
- Through the Keyhole (2014, 2017)
- The TV That Made Me (2016)
- The Keith & Paddy Picture Show (2017)
- Michael McIntyre's The Wheel (2021)
- Sunday Brunch (2023, 2024)

== Discography ==
=== Studio albums ===
List of studio albums, with selected chart positions
Title	Album details	Peak chart positions		Certifications
Title	Album details	UK	UK Classical Artist	Certifications
Moving On	Released: 20 October 2003; Label: UCJ; Formats: CD	32	2	BPI: Gold
My Lullabies: Motown	Released: 9 October 2022; Label: Stanley Park Music; Formats: Download	—N/a		—N/a
My Lullabies: Christmas	Released: 24 November 2022; Re-released: 14 December 2023; Label: Stanley Park Music; Formats: Download	—N/a		—N/a
My Jungle Lullabies	Released: 19 May 2023; Label: Stanley Park Music; Formats: Download	—N/a		—N/a
My Taylor Lullabies	Released: 4 April 2025; Label: Stanley Park Music; Formats: Download	—N/a		—N/a

=== Compilation albums ===
List of compilation albums, with selected chart positions
Title	Album details	Peak chart positions	
Title	Album details	UK Compilations	UK Classical Compilations
Myleene's Music for Romance	Released: 2 July 2007; Label: EMI Classics; Formats: CD	9	1
Myleene's Music for Mothers	Released: 5 January 2008; Label: EMI Classics; Formats: CD	14	1

=== Singles ===
- "Toccata and Fugue" (2003)
- "Nothing To Lose" with Veronica Green (2021)

== Bibliography ==
- My Bump and Me (Virgin Books, 2008) ISBN 9781905264247
- Things to Make and Do With Your Children (Orion, 2013) ISBN 9781409144212
- They Don't Teach This at School (HQ, 2023) ISBN 9780008467913

== Awards and nominations ==
Year	Category	Nominated for	Result	Ref.
2007	Cosmopolitan Ultimate Woman Awards	Ultimate Comeback Queen	Won	
2008	Cosmopolitan Ultimate Woman Awards	Ultimate TV Presenter	Won	
2013	Glamour Awards	Entrepreneur of the Year	Won	
2015	National Reality TV Awards	Best Reality TV Judge	Nominated	

== See also ==
- List of Dancing on Ice contestants
- List of I'm a Celebrity...Get Me Out of Here! (British TV series) contestants
