= Gregg Lowe =

British actor (born 1994)

Gregg Lowe is a British-Canadian actor and voice artist.

Lowe is from Gorleston-on-Sea, Norfolk, and was educated at Cliff Park High School.

In 2015, Lowe collapsed at the finish line after running the Toronto Marathon. He was clinically dead for three minutes before being revived by student paramedics.

Lowe is an ambassador for the Ocean conservation society Sea Shepherd. In 2015, he was part of the campaign Operation Milagro.

== Filmography ==
=== Film ===
Year	Title	Role	Notes
2014	X-Men: Days of Future Past	Ink	

=== Television ===
Year	Title	Role	Notes
2013	Spies of Warsaw	Hans	2 episodes
2013	Bomb Girls	Quincy	Episode: "Blood Relations"
2014	Grantchester	Sandy	4 episodes
2016	Reign	Cedric	Episode: "Our Undoing"
2017	Frankie Drake Mysteries	Archie	Episode: "Summer in the City"
2019	Jett	Bobby	5 episodes
2026	Dragon Striker	Griffin Wells (voice)	Recurring

=== Video games ===
Year	Title	Voice role	Notes
2015	Assassin's Creed: Syndicate	Brinley Elsworth	The Last Maharaja DLC
2017	Horizon Zero Dawn	Abas, Den	
2017	Wolfenstein II: The New Colossus	Crowds	
2020	Watch Dogs: Legion	Zero Day	
2022	Bratz: Flaunt Your Fashion	Eitan	
2023	Lies of P	Battle Maniac of the Black Rabbit Brotherhood	
2025	Final Fantasy Tactics: The Ivalice Chronicles	Delita	
