= Ogun (comics) =

- Ogun from Kitty Pryde and Wolverine #2. Art by Al Milgrom.

Publication information
- Publisher: Marvel Comics
- First appearance: Kitty Pryde and Wolverine #1 (November 1984)
- Created by: Chris Claremont (writer); Al Milgrom (artist)

In-story information
- Alter ego: Unknown
- Species: Human
- Team affiliations: Imperial Japanese Army; Yakuza
- Abilities: Telepathic ability to switch bodies and control minds, which is derived from either a mutation or mystical powers; Superhuman agility and reflexes; Slowed or halted aging

Ogun is a fictional character, a Japanese supervillain appearing in American comic books published by Marvel Comics. The character has been depicted as an enemy of Wolverine. His first appearance was in Kitty Pryde and Wolverine #2 (December 1984), and was scripted by Chris Claremont and drawn by Allen Milgrom.

== Fictional character biography ==
Ogun is a ninja and martial arts master who was Wolverine's mentor. Very little is known of his past or the exact nature of his abilities, but he is apparently a mutant with the ability to control minds via telepathy. His reflexes and reaction time also appear to have been enhanced beyond the range attainable by normal humans, such as that he was easily a match for Wolverine.

Ogun first met Wolverine in Shanghai, China. Shanghai was held by the Empire of Japan, following the Battle of Shanghai in the Second Sino-Japanese War. Ogun was reportedly active in the war as a captain of the Imperial Japanese Army. Wolverine was only a wandering sailor but managed to draw the attention of the captain who would seek his acquaintance.

At some point in the past, Ogun fell from the path of honor and was a criminal enforcer for the Yakuza. Ogun mentally possesses Kitty Pryde and attempts to make her into an assassin. Under Wolverine's care, Pryde recovers and resists another brainwashing attempt, with Wolverine killing Ogun. Ogun returns as a disembodied spirit, mentally possessing host after host, and continues to battle Wolverine.

== Powers and abilities ==
The extent and nature of Ogun's powers was never fully revealed. He demonstrated the ability to control minds and could remove his spirit from his body and place in a new host (submerging that host body's personality). His original body also seemed to be somewhat resistant to injury, although Wolverine managed to kill him. Ogun was able to survive impalement through the torso by a sword thrust with no apparent ill-effects. His reflexes and agility were heightened beyond normal human levels. It is implied that Ogun was a telepath who also had some mystical powers, but this was never clearly specified. In life, Ogun was also apparently capable of slowing or completely halting his aging; a legend is mentioned where he had once a duel of wills with the Japanese swordmaster Miyamoto Musashi.

== In other media ==
=== Television ===
- Ogun appears in the Wolverine and the X-Men episode "Code of Conduct", voiced by James Sie. This version is Wolverine's sensei.

=== Film ===
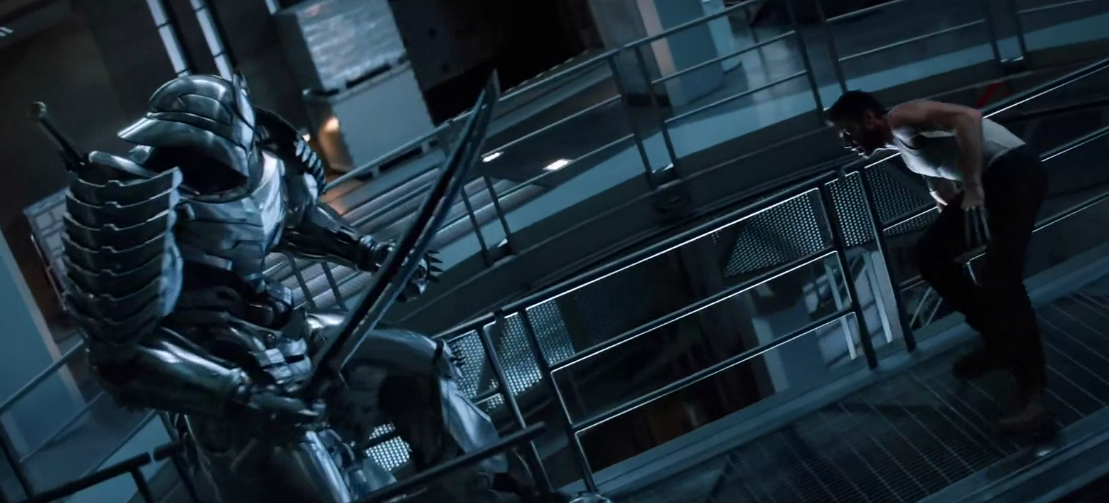
Ichirō Yashida fighting Logan in The Wolverine.

- A character inspired by Ogun and Silver Samurai named Ichirō Yashida appears in The Wolverine, with Haruhiko Yamanouchi portraying his older self and Ken Yamamura portraying his younger self. He is the founder of the Yashida Clan's technology empire, Shingen Yashida's father, Mariko Yashida's grandfather, and Yukio's foster father. As a young man in the Japanese military during World War II, Yashida was saved by Logan during the United States' atomic bombing of Nagasaki and became obsessed with the latter's healing factor and immortality. As an old man dying of cancer in the present, Yashida arranges for Logan to see him one more time and asks Mariko to succeed him instead of Shingen before seemingly dying. In reality, Yashida faked his death and tasked Viper with helping him develop a giant robotic suit made of adamantium armed with a katana and wakizashi capable of being super-heated to sustain himself and steal Logan's powers. After eliminating his enforcer Kenuichio Harada for betraying him, Yashida uses his adamantium weapons to sever Logan's adamantium claws and extract his healing factor. However, Mariko uses the claws to attack Yashida, who loses control of his suit while Logan regenerates his original bone claws and kills him.

=== Video games ===
- Ogun appears in Marvel's Wolverine. This version, known simply as "the Telepath", is a member of the Hand and a mutant possessing telepathic powers.

=== Merchandise ===
- The Wolverine figure produced as part of Toy Biz's Marvel Legends line comes with a display stand featuring Ogun.
