= Kitty Pryde and Wolverine =

1984-1985 six-issue comic book limited series

- Al Milgrom's cover to Kitty Pryde and Wolverine #6 (April 1985)

Publication information
- Publisher: Marvel Comics
- Schedule: Monthly
- Format: Limited series
- Genre: Superhero
- Publication date: November 1984 – April 1985
- No. of issues: 6
- Main character(s): Kitty Pryde; Wolverine; Ogun

Creative team
- Written by: Chris Claremont
- Artist: Al Milgrom

Collected editions
- Hardcover: ISBN 0-7851-3089-6

Kitty Pryde and Wolverine is a six-issue comic book limited series written by Chris Claremont and illustrated by Al Milgrom, and published by Marvel Comics between November 1984 and April 1985.

A spin-off of the series Uncanny X-Men, it chronicles a Japanese adventure of two of the most popular X-Men of the time, Kitty Pryde and Wolverine.

== Publication history ==
In the introductory pages of the hardcover edition of Kitty Pryde and Wolverine (published 2008), Milgrom explains that the mini-series was powered by three main ideas. Firstly, Wolverine was the "hottest property around" that the X-Men franchise had, so stories with him would sell well. Secondly, Kitty Pryde was "Chris' [Claremont] baby", and Claremont was eager to develop this character further. Thirdly, Milgrom himself saw this as a unique chance to work with Marvel Comics legend Claremont.

Claremont then wrote a story in which he could bring in new angles on the two characters. Kitty Pryde — previously little more than a sweet and innocent "kid sister" for the older X-Men, a literary foil to provide light-hearted moments — was portrayed as troubled with "teenager self-doubt and self-deprecation", "searching for her very soul" and going through the coming of age. Wolverine was put into the honor-driven, mystical Japanese culture, in which he was no longer the X-Men's campy hardman but "grim and gritty".

To express the atypically dark and personal story, Milgrom also adapted his drawing style, using bolder, darker and more dynamic strokes. In the end, he was very satisfied with the project.

In six issues, writer Chris Claremont takes Kitty Pryde fresh from her breakup with Colossus in Uncanny X-Men #183 and puts her through a trial of fire in which she confronts her inner demons and emerges victorious. Claremont also plays off the contrast between Kitty and the battle-hardened Wolverine, and the two very different characters establish a platonic, brother-and-sister-like rapport (beginning a tradition of sorts for Wolverine and young female sidekicks). A testament to his newfound esteem for her character, Wolverine would even consider Kitty as a potential leader for the X-Men, were it not for her sheer youth, in later issues of the regular series.

Kitty Pryde and Wolverine is also responsible for establishing Kitty's superhero image, finally settling on a costume which she would wear into the early 1990s, and choosing the codename "Shadowcat" (having previously flitted between "Ariel" and "Sprite"), which she took on after this adventure and has held on until today.

Forty years later, Claremont returned to write a follow-up mini-series, Wolverine and Kitty Pryde, with Damian Coucerio providing the artwork. Its plot links to the immediate aftermath of its predecessor, in which Wolverine helps Kitty in dealing with the effects of Ogun's mind control of her. The first issue was published on April 30, 2025.

== Plot summary ==
Kitty Pryde's father Carmen has run into trouble with the Japanese yakuza. In order to help him, Kitty follows him on a business trip but is captured by mob boss Shigematsu and the evil ninja Ogun, who brainwashes her into becoming a deadly ninja assassin. After she has perfected her skills, Ogun orders her to kill Wolverine, Ogun's former student, who has come to Japan to look for Kitty.

A masked Kitty almost kills Wolverine, before she is knocked out by Logan's friend Yukio and comes to her senses. Terrified at having been turned into a killing machine, Kitty wants to flee, but Logan challenges her to overcome her conditioning by focusing on her inner strength. Ogun later returns to attack Mariko Yashida, Wolverine's love, and his adopted daughter Amiko in order to draw him and Kitty out. Kitty defies Ogun's renewed attempt to brainwash her, and after Wolverine defeats Ogun, he offers Kitty the chance to kill him, but she balks, stating she cannot do it. For Wolverine, it is the proof that she is truly herself again. When Ogun tries to kill her, Wolverine impales him on his claws. Carmen Pryde exposes Shigematsu's schemes, turning himself in, and they return to the United States.

== Sequel ==
In 2025, Marvel Comics published a follow-up limited series titled Wolverine and Kitty Pryde, written by Chris Claremont with artwork by Damian Couceiro. The series was released approximately forty years after the original miniseries.

Rather than taking place in the modern day, the story is set shortly after the events of the original series and expands on Kitty Pryde's recovery from Ogun's psychological manipulation and training. Wolverine continues to mentor Kitty as she attempts to deal with the lingering effects of her experiences in Japan.

The five-issue limited series began publication on April 30, 2025, and serves as a direct continuation of Claremont's original storyline while also filling in events between Kitty Pryde and Wolverine and Kitty's subsequent appearances in Uncanny X-Men.

== Collected editions ==
The story was reprinted several times: in Wolverine And Gambit (issues 62 to 68), in a premiere hardback published June 2008 (ISBN 0-7851-3089-6), in 2009's Wolverine Omnibus Volume 1, and as part of the Marvel's Mightiest Heroes partworks series, in issue No. 117, simply titled Kitty Pryde.

Title	Material collected	Publication date	ISBN
Kitty Pryde and Wolverine	Kitty Pryde and Wolverine #1–6	June 2008	0-7851-3089-6
