= Yashida =

Yashida is an unusual Japanese surname associated, in the West, with two characters of the Marvel Comics Universe:

- Mariko Yashida
- Shingen Yashida
