= Kenuichio Harada =

Kenuichio Harada Silver Samurai
- Kenuichio Harada / Silver Samurai fighting Wolverine. Textless variant cover of Powers of X #1 (July 2019). Art by Mike Huddleston.

Publication information
- Publisher: Marvel Comics
- First appearance: Daredevil #111 (July 1974)
- Created by: Steve Gerber; Bob Brown

In-story information
- Alter ego: Kenuichio Harada
- Species: Human mutant
- Team affiliations: Legion Accursed; Clan Yashida; Big Hero 6 Hydra
- Partnerships: Black Spectre; Mandrill; Viper
- Notable aliases: Silver Samurai; Silver Shogun
- Abilities: Ability to generate a tachyon field capable of cutting through almost anything; Extensive knowledge of criminal organizations; Carries katana, shuriken and other weapons; Wears a lightweight steel alloy body armor; Master samurai and martial artist; Teleportation ring

Kenuichio Harada is a character appearing in American comic books published by Marvel Comics. Created by writer Steve Gerber and artist Bob Brown, the character first appeared in Daredevil #111 (July 1974). While typically portrayed as a supervillain in his initial appearances, he eventually evolved into a more heroic figure.

The son of Japanese crime lord Shingen Yashida, head of the influential Clan Yashida, Kenuichio Harada is a freelance mercenary and the first individual to use the Silver Samurai codename. Trained in the traditional disciplines of the samurai, he possesses the mutant ability to generate energy from within his body and channel it through inanimate objects. He commonly wields a katana infused with this energy via a tachyon field, allowing it to cut through nearly any material. Throughout his history, he has faced several heroes, including Daredevil, Spider-Man, Black Widow, and most notably Wolverine, and has served as the leader of the original Big Hero 6.

Since his original introduction in comics, the character has been featured in various other Marvel-licensed products, including video games, animated television series, and merchandise. Kenuichio Harada made his live-action debut in The Wolverine (2013), portrayed by Will Yun Lee.

== Publication history ==
Kenuichio Harada debuted in Daredevil #111 (July 1974), created by writer Steve Gerber and artist Bob Brown. He subsequently appeared in several Marvel comic books, including Marvel Team-Up (1972), Marvel's Voices: Identity (2021), and Ultimate Spider-Man: Incursion (2025).

== Fictional character biography ==
Kenuichio Harada is the illegitimate son of Shingen Yashida. A Japanese mutant who uses his powers to charge his katana, his samurai-style armor made of a silvery metal led to the Silver Samurai moniker. In his first appearance, Harada is hired by Mandrill and Black Spectre and battles Daredevil.

Harada works as the bodyguard for the international terrorist Viper, and occasionally as a mercenary. During an attack on Japan, he kills police officer Kioshi Keishicho. This led to Amatsu-Mikaboshi giving Koishi a deal that transformed him into the Ebon Samurai.

Harada becomes the Oyabun (leader) of Clan Yashida after his half-sister Mariko Yashida dies. He attempts to pay off his clan's debts to the Yakuza and restore its honor. Despite he and Wolverine having been bitter enemies, Harada is entrusted with the care of Amiko Kobayashi, Wolverine's adoptive daughter.

The Silver Samurai helps Wolverine destroy "Doombringer", and later helps him rescue Amiko and Yukio from their kidnappers. During his time as a hero, Silver Samurai becomes the leader of the Japanese superhero team Big Hero 6.

The Silver Samurai us brainwashed by Blindspot into forgetting his time as a hero, believing his redemption was a result of Professor X's brainwashing. As a result, he returns to his previous criminal activities. Harada was operating as the chief security officer for the Prime Minister of Japan.

The Silver Samurai is abducted, incarcerated in the Raft prison in the United States without trial, and declared legally dead. He is freed by Madame Hydra and the Hand, who return him to Japan. They want him to lead the Hand and unite the Japanese criminal underworld, hoping he can take on shadowy figures controlling both Hydra and S.H.I.E.L.D. that Madame Hydra was reluctant to name. Harada is not interested in a war and helps the Avengers stop the Hand.

Silver Samurai is one of the few mutants who retain their superhuman powers after M-Day. Wolverine makes his way to Japan in search of Harada and engages him in battle. Wolverine's memories were recovered due to the events of House of M and asked Silver Samurai questions about the past during the course of their fight. Silver Samurai runs Wolverine through with one of his swords. Immediately afterward, Wolverine cuts off Harada's right hand.

After the Skrull invasion, Viper leaves Silver Samurai to rejoin Hydra. Viper and Valentina Allegra de Fontaine take a mysterious box from the Yashida family, who claim that those who open the box will die soon afterward. Some time later, members of Leviathan attack Silver Samurai to make him divulge the box's location.

While defending his home from the Red Right Hand, Silver Samurai is mortally wounded and later dies. He later appeared in Hell blaming Wolverine for the recent deaths of people and was beheaded by Marduk Kurios's Soulcutter after speaking. Long after his death, Silver Samurai is resurrected by the Five and became responsible for officiating combat at the Arena in the Quarry.

== Powers and abilities ==
Kenuichio Harada is a mutant with the ability to generate a tachyon field which he generally focuses through his katana. He commonly uses his power on his sword, enabling it to cut through nearly anything, except substances as hard as adamantium. He is an expert in the history and customs of the samurai class (Bushido). As a self-styled samurai, he is a master of kenjutsu and other martial arts. Kenuichio specializes in edged weapons, hand-to-hand combat, and military tactics. Keniuchio has extensive knowledge of the operations of criminal organizations due to his shady past, which he used in the service of his government to combat such organizations.

=== Equipment ===
When working with the Viper, Kenuichio possessed a teleportation ring, which allowed him to teleport from one location to another, granting him great mobility and stealth. He usually wears a suit of lightweight steel alloy body armor, modeled after traditional samurai armor, but made of modern protective materials. He carries a katana (long sword), shuriken (throwing stars), and other weaponry.

== Reception ==
George Marston of GamesRadar+ commented that Silver Samurai is one of Wolverine's most visually striking enemies. As a mutant capable of channeling energy through his sword, Marston noted that Silver Samurai would be an ideal addition to a combat-heavy game, combining both striking visuals and engaging gameplay potential. Tim Webber of Comic Book Resources named Silver Samurai one of Wolverine's most iconic villains. Silver Samurai was the winner of a popularity contest held by Marvel Comics in 2023, which served to determine who would be a new character in Marvel Puzzle Quest.

== Other versions ==
=== Age of Apocalypse ===
An alternate universe version of Kenuichio Harada appears in "Age of Apocalypse". This version is the X-Men who does not wear a helmet and has a red upside-down Omega symbol tattooed on his forehead. He is later killed in action while defending the last human stronghold from the forces of the now-crazed Wolverine.

=== Exiles ===
An alternate universe version of Kenuichio Harada from Earth-172 appears in Exiles #83. This version has an amicable relationship with his universe's Mariko Yashida and Wolverine. After their Wolverine is recruited into Weapon X and subsequently killed in action, Harada and Yashida cremate Wolverine's body without knowing the circumstances of his death.

=== House of M ===
An alternate universe version of Kenuichio Harada appears in House of M. This version is a powerful businessman who secretly operates as the head of Clan Yashida, a powerful crime family.

=== Marvel Noir ===
An alternate universe version of Kenuichio Harada appears in X-Men Noir. This version is a policeman.

=== Marvel Zombies ===
A zombified alternate universe version of Kenuichio Harada appears in Marvel Zombies vs. The Army of Darkness #4.

=== Ultimate Universe ===
An alternate universe version of Silver Samurai from Earth-6160 appears in the Ultimate Universe imprint. This version is a member of the Harada-Yoshida Alliance, a consolidated union of three clans ruling over Japan.

=== What If? ===
An alternate universe version of Kenuichio Harada appears in the What If story "What If Wolverine Had Married Mariko". This version allied with Mariko Yashida and Wolverine in their struggle against the Kingpin, who has taken control of the Yakuza and battled the Shingen clan for control. The Silver Samurai is later revealed to have been secretly working for the Kingpin. He assassinates Mariko, whereupon Wolverine kills him in retaliation.

== In other media ==
=== Television ===
- Kenuichio Harada / Silver Samurai appears in the X-Men: The Animated Series episode "The Lotus and the Steel", voiced by Denis Akiyama. This version is a gang leader.
  - Silver Samurai makes a non-speaking cameo appearance in the X-Men '97 three-part episode "Tolerance Is Extinction".
- Kenuichio Harada / Silver Samurai appears in the Wolverine and the X-Men episode "Code of Conduct", voiced by Keone Young. This version is Mariko Yashida's ambitious husband and a member of the Yakuza who previously fought Wolverine over Mariko’s affection and was defeated. In the present, Harada seeks a rematch with Wolverine to restore his honor and become the head of the Yakuza. After Harada launches an unsanctioned attack on Wolverine and the X-Men, his leader demands that the two settle their conflict through a duel without the use of their mutant abilities in accordance with the samurai code. During the fight, Harada taunts Wolverine by claiming that he married Mariko only to keep her away from him. Despite this, Wolverine defeats Harada once again. Furious, Harada attempts to cheat by using his powers, but the Yakuza intervene, knock him unconscious, and forfeit the duel on his behalf. Mariko later tells Wolverine that Harada will be driven from the Yakuza in shame and never be re-admitted.
- Kenuichio Harada / Silver Samurai appears in Marvel Disk Wars: The Avengers, voiced by Takanori Nishikawa. This version is depicted as an old adversary of Iron Man.
- Kenuichio Harada / Silver Samurai appears in Hit-Monkey, voiced by Noshir Dalal. This version is arrogant and regarded as Japan's greatest hero.

=== Film ===
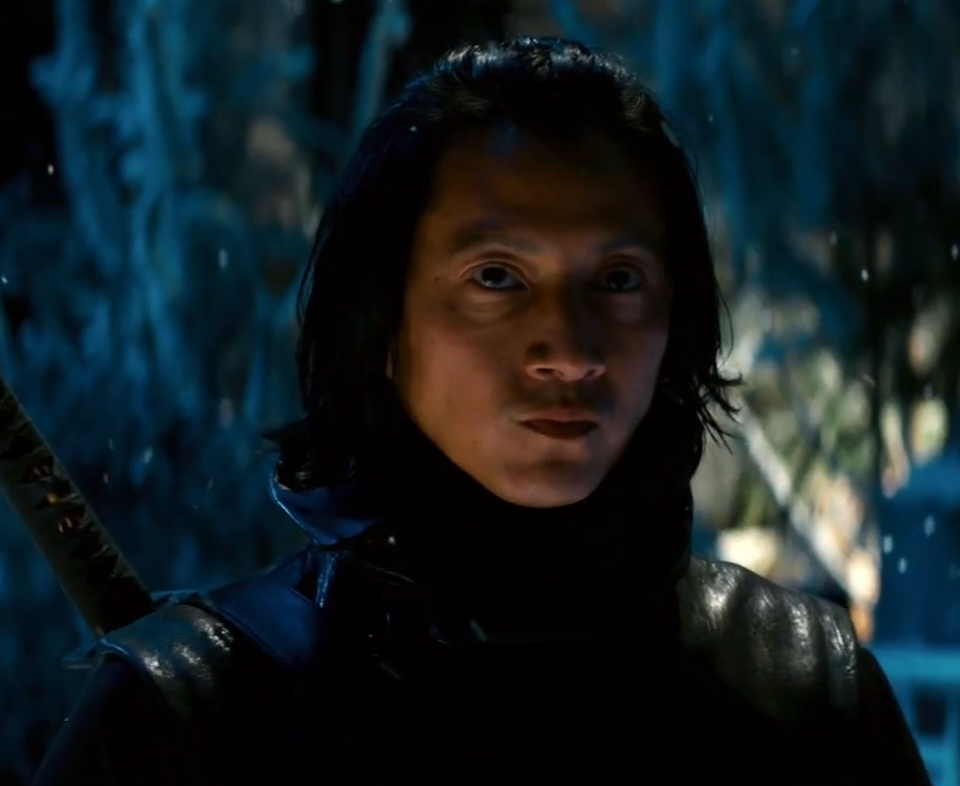
Kenuichio Harada, portrayed by Will Yun Lee in The Wolverine (2013)

Kenuichio Harada appears in The Wolverine, portrayed by Will Yun Lee. This version is a human archer and the leader of the Black Ninja Clan, which is sworn to protect the Yashida Clan. He is depicted as a former lover of Mariko Yashida and is not stated to be related to Shingen Yashida. During the Yakuza's attack on Ichirō Yashida's apparent funeral, Harada protects Mariko, though he later leads the Black Ninja Clan in kidnapping her on behalf of the mutant Viper and Ichiro. After realizing the error of his ways during a battle with Logan, Harada attempts to stop Ichiro but is ultimately killed by him.

=== Video games ===
- Kenuichio Harada / Silver Samurai appears as a playable character in X-Men: Children of the Atom, voiced by Yasushi Ikeda. This version wields giant shurikens and can empower his katana with elemental properties.
- Kenuichio Harada / Silver Samurai appears as a playable character in Marvel vs. Capcom 2: New Age of Heroes, voiced again by Yasushi Ikeda.
- Kenuichio Harada / Silver Samurai appears as a boss in X-Men: The Official Game, voiced by Keone Young. This version is the head of Hydra and the mentor of Lady Deathstrike.
- Kenuichio Harada / Silver Samurai appears in Pinball FX 2, voiced by Matthew Mercer.
- Kenuichio Harada / Silver Samurai appears as an unlockable playable character in Lego Marvel Super Heroes, voiced by Andrew Kishino.
- Kenuichio Harada / Silver Samurai appears as a playable character in Marvel Puzzle Quest.
- Kenuichio Harada / Silver Samurai appears as a playable character in Marvel Contest of Champions.
- Kenuichio Harada / Silver Samurai appears as a playable card in Marvel Snap.

=== Merchandise ===
- In 2021, Iron Studios released a Kenuichio Harada / Silver Samurai statuette as part of the X-Men versus Sentinels battle diorama.
- In 2019 and 2025, Hasbro released a Kenuichio Harada / Silver Samurai action figure as part of the Marvel Legends action figure line.
