= Haruhiko Yamanouchi =

Japanese-Italian actor (born 1946)

- 山内 春彦
- Born: 20 April 1946 (age 80); Tokyo, Japan
- Other names: Hal Yamanouchi; Al Huang
- Education: Tokyo University of Foreign Studies
- Occupations: Actor; voice artist; dancer; choreographer; stunt performer; essayist; mime
- Years active: 1976–present
- Spouse: Teresa Piazza (divorced)
- Children: Taiyo Yamanouchi

Haruhiko Yamanouchi (山内 春彦, Yamanouchi Haruhiko; born 20 April 1946), also known as Hal Yamanouchi (ハル・ヤマノウチ, Haru Yamanouchi), is a Japanese-Italian actor, voice artist, dancer, choreographer, stunt performer, essayist and former mime. Born in Tokyo, he has resided in Italy since 1975 and holds Italian citizenship.

Beginning his career as a mime, he has performed in and choreographed for numerous stage productions. Since 1976, he has acted in over 100 films and television series, including several 1980s genre films directed by the likes of Sergio Martino, Ruggero Deodato and Enzo G. Castellari. He is best known to international audiences for his villainous supporting roles in Wes Anderson's The Life Aquatic with Steve Zissou and The Wolverine. He has also translated and dubbed Japanese-language films into Italian.

== Early life and education ==
Yamanouchi was born in Tokyo. His grandfather, Akio Yamauchi, was a children's book writer. He grew up in Niigata Prefecture and graduated from Niigata High School and went on to study liberal arts at the Tokyo University of Foreign Studies. After graduation in 1971, he moved to London where he attended drama and dancing lessons. He was among the disciples of mime artist Lindsay Kemp.

== Career ==
=== Theatre ===
While in London, he joined Stomu Yamashta's Red Buddha Theatre company, performing at the Roundhouse and the Piccadilly Theatre. He moved to Italy in 1975 and he began his career as an actor in experimental stage productions, appearing at pantomime festivals like the Festival Internazionale di mimo e pantomima in Florence and Settembre al Borgo in Campania. He was a regular guest on RAI programming, where he would demonstrate his various acts. He first gained recognition for his stage acting in a production of William Shakespeare's The Tempest where he played the role of Ariel in over 300 stagings and earned him a Premio Internazionale Guido d'Arezzo.

As a choreographer, Yamanouchi specializes in opera, collaborating with directors like Mauro Bolognini, Andrea Camilleri, Giancarlo Cobelli, Glauco Mauri, Mario Missiroli, Giuliano Montaldo and Luca Ronconi. He choreographed a production of Turandot held at the Yoyogi National Gymnasium.

=== Film and television ===
Yamanouchi is made his screen acting debut with an uncredited role in the 1975 Fantozzi, directed by Luciano Salce. He appeared in numerous erotic comedies and B-movies throughout the 1980s, including Crime at the Chinese Restaurant (1981), 2020 Texas Gladiators (1982), The Sword of the Barbarians (1982), 2019, After the Fall of New York (1983), Endgame (1983), Warriors of the Year 2072 (1984), Under the Chinese Restaurant (1987), Phantom of Death (1988). He was occasionally credited under the pseudonym Al Huang.

More high-profile roles taken by Yamanouchi include starring in Adriano Celentano's musical Joan Lui (1985) and in Gabriele Salvatores's science-fiction film Nirvana (1997). He also appeared in several American productions, such as Stuart Gordon's Robot Jox (1990), Wes Anderson's The Life Aquatic with Steve Zissou (2004), Paul McGuigan's Push (2009) and Peter Weir's The Way Back (2010). He most notably portrayed the older Ichirō Yashida / Silver Samurai in The Wolverine (2013) (sharing the main antagonist's role with Ken Yamamura), starring opposite Hugh Jackman, Tao Okamoto and Hiroyuki Sanada and also dubbed over his own dialogue and Ken Yamamura's in the Italian-language version of the film.

As a voice actor, Yamanouchi has translated and dubbed numerous Japanese-language films and television series into Italian and occasionally vice versa. He typically provides the Italian voice of Asian characters in international productions and is the main Italian voice actor of Ken Watanabe, and in his animated roles, he voiced Floyd Eaglesan in the Italian dubbed version of Despicable Me 2 (2013) and Bernie Lumen in the Italian dubbed version of Elemental (2023).

=== Teaching ===
Yamanouchi co-founded MDA Produzioni Danza, a dance and performing arts school in the Castelnuovo di Porto neighbourhood of Rome. He has also taught at the Silvio D'Amico National Academy of Dramatic Arts, Teatro dell'Opera di Roma and the Teatro Carlo Felice. He has also conducted numerous internships for mimes, dancers and actors for various associations, foundations and theater schools, on the themes of improvisation, spontaneous movements and acting with the kinesthetic approach.

== Personal life ==
From his marriage with TG3 journalist Teresa Piazza, he has a son, Taiyo Yamanouchi, who is an actor and hip hop artist who performs under the stage name 'Hyst'. He has also served as a secondary father figure to Jesto, Taiyo's half-brother from Piazza's relationship with Stefano Rosso.

Yamanouchi has resided in Rome since emigrating to Italy in 1975. He became a naturalized citizen in 1992. He is fluent in Japanese, Italian and English and has performed in all three languages. He has penned a number of essays on Italian and Japanese culture for Italian literary magazines and has contributed to UNESCO's International Theatre Institute.

== Filmography ==
=== Film ===
Year	Title	Role(s)	Notes
1975	Fantozzi	Asian Cook	Uncredited
1976	Basta che non si sappia in giro	Japanese Sailor	Uncredited
1977	Emanuelle and the Last Cannibals	Manolo	
1979	Gardenia	Courier	
1979	Saturday, Sunday and Friday	Japanese passenger	
1980	I'm Photogenic	Simoni's butler	
1980	The Last Hunter	Vietcong	
1981	Crime at the Chinese Restaurant	Corpse	
1982	2020 Texas Gladiators	Red Wolfe	
1982	The Sword of the Barbarians	Li Wo Twan	
1983	2019, After the Fall of New York	Rat Eater King	
1983	Hearts and Armour	Samurai	
1983	Sing Sing	Chu Lai	
1983	Endgame	Ninja	
1984	Warriors of the Year 2072	Akira	
1985	Anche lei fumava il sigaro	Bongo	
1985	Nell'acqua		
1985	Joan Lui	Jarak	
1986	Lone Runner	Nimbus	
1986	7 chili in 7 giorni	Chinese waiter	
1987	Under the Chinese Restaurant	Chinese chef	
1988	Phantom of Death	Swordmaster	
1988	Cream Train	Carmal	
1989	Sinbad of the Seven Seas	Cantu	
1990	Robot Jox	Tubie #1	
1990	Blue Dolphin	Banzai Samurai	
1992	A Bear Called Arthur	Ohnishi	
1992	Genghis Khan		Unfinished
1993	Craving Desire		
1995	The Fishmen and Their Queen	Priest	
1996	We Free Kings		
1997	Il tocco - La sfida		
1997	Nirvana	Okasama Starr	
1997	Banzai	Policeman	
1999	All the Moron's Men	Yakuza boss	
1999	The Fish in Love	Korea consul	
2001	Tutta la conoscenza del mondo		
2004	Movimenti	Japanese writer	
2004	Last Food	Takano	
2004	The Life Aquatic with Steve Zissou	Chief Pirate	
2007	Tutte le donne della mia vita	Sakè	
2008	The Rage	Asian character	
2008	This Night Is Still Ours	Laowang	
2009	Push	Pop Father	
2010	The Way Back	Official	
2010	Gorbaciof	Lila's father	
2010	Late Summer	Kenji	
2011	All at Sea	Confù	
2012	Sins Expiation	Hal	
2012	The Day of the Siege: September Eleven 1683	Murad Giray	
2013	Niente può fermarci	Mr. Lee	
2013	The Wolverine	Ichirō Yashida / Silver Samurai	Also dubbed in Italian
2013	Something Good	Laboratory chemist	
2013	The Girl from Nagasaki	Gardner	
2013	Colpi di fortuna	Arrambator	
2014	A Boss in the Living Room	Meditation master	
2015	Ebola		
2016	Zoolander 2	Wise village man	
2016	The Confessions	Emperor of Japan	
2016	Al posto tuo	Dr. Shimura	
2017	Grain	Leon	
2017	The Slider	Goro Nagano	
2017	Addio fottuti musi verdi	Yang	
2018	Vanishing Balances: Mafia vs Yakuza	Yutaka Zenshin	
2018	San Valentino Stories	Monaco Buddhist	
2019	Hard Night Falling		
2020	Romantic Guide to Lost Places		
2020	Defectum		
2021	They Talk	Professor Hasegawa	
2021	Medium	Hung	
2023	Luka		
2023	Land of Women		
2023	Diabolik: Who Are You?	Chen-Fu	
2024	The Thief of Falling Stars	TFS Leader	
2024	Iron Fighter	Alpha	
2025	Make a Wish	Eisuke	

=== Television ===
Year	Title	Role(s)	Notes
1985	Christopher Columbus	Guacanabo	4 episodes
1986	Atelier	Kosci Kissaraghi	1 episode ("Computer Fashion")
1986	I figli dell'ispettore	Japanese terrorist	TV film
1987	Treasure Island in Outer Space	Shadow	5 episodes
1987	Tutti in palestra	Kung fu master	TV mini-series
1988	Una casa a Roma		TV film
1989	The House of Lost Souls	Buddhist monk	TV film
1991	I ragazzi del muretto		1 episode ("Il ritorno di Massimo")
1992	Un inviato molto speciale	Butler	1 episode ("Se lo dice Giuditta")
1994	Italian Restaurant		
1998	Il mastino	Pao Cheng Fu	1 episode ("Shangai")
1998	The White Elephant	Lo Yan	TV film
1999	Shadows		TV film
2001	L'impero	Chinese mafia boss	TV mini-series
2001	Don Matteo	Guillermo Rivarola	1 episode ("Il morso del serpente")
2006	La moglie cinese	Lao Xiao	TV mini-series
2006	L'ispettore Coliandro	Lu Yang	1 episode ("Vendetta cinese")
2011	Dove la trovi una come me?	Mister Woo	TV film
2011–2014	Inspector Rex	Shop owner / Hiroshi Watanabe	2 episodes
2014	Street Fighter: Assassin's Fist	Senzô	4 episodes
2015	Il bosco	Miong	4 episodes
2015	Strike Back		
2016	Zio Gianni	Anzin	2 episodes
2018	Squadra mobile		
2023	The Swarm	Akito Nakamura	8 episodes
2025	Sandokan	Tuwak Balau	TV mini-series

== Voice work ==
Year|	Title	Role(s)	Notes
2015	Mokusatsu	Doctor	Short film
2015	Fukushima: A Nuclear Story	Italian and English voice-over	Documentary

=== Dubbing ===
==== Films (Animation, Italian dub) ====
Year	Title	Role(s)	Ref
2013	Despicable Me 2	Floyd Eaglesan	
2023	Elemental	Bernie Lumen	

==== Films (Live action, Italian dub) ====
Year	Title	Role(s)	Original actor	Ref
2003	The Last Samurai	Lord Moritsugu Katsumoto	Ken Watanabe	
2005	Batman Begins	Ra's al Ghul decoy	Ken Watanabe	
2007	Silk	Hara Jubei	Koji Yakusho	
2008	Speed Racer	Mr. Musha	Hiroyuki Sanada	
2008	The Ramen Girl	Maezumi	Toshiyuki Nishida	
2009	The Hedgehog	Kakuro Ozu	Togo Igawa	
2009	G.I. Joe: The Rise of Cobra	The Hard Master	Gerald Okamura	
2010	Inception	Saito	Ken Watanabe	
2010	True Grit	Mr. Lee	Peter Leung	
2012	Paulette	Chang	Bing Yin	
2013	The Wolverine	Young Yashida	Ken Yamamura	
2014	Godzilla	Dr. Ishirō Serizawa	Ken Watanabe	
2014	Dumb and Dumber To	Harry's adoptive father	Michael Yama	
2015	Pixels	Tōru Iwatani	Denis Akiyama	
2016	Silence	Ichizo	Yoshi Oida	
2016	Arrival	General Shang	Tzi Ma	
2016	USS Indianapolis: Men of Courage	Mochitsura Hashimoto	Yutaka Takeuchi	
2017	Death Note	Watari	Paul Nakauchi	
2018	Mamma Mia! Here We Go Again	Mr. Tatyama	Togo Igawa	
2018	Second Act	Philip Jiang	Phil Nee	
2019	Pokémon Detective Pikachu	Hideo Yoshida	Ken Watanabe	
2019	Godzilla: King of the Monsters	Dr. Ishirō Serizawa	Ken Watanabe	
2019	Midway	Isoroku Yamamoto	Etsushi Toyokawa	
2022	Bullet Train	The Elder	Hiroyuki Sanada	
2023	The Creator	Harun	Ken Watanabe	
2023	Sidonie in Japan	Kenzo Mizoguchi	Tsuyoshi Ihara	
2025	Rental Family	Kikuo Hasegawa	Akira Emoto	

==== Television (Live action, Italian dub) ====
Year	Title	Role(s)	Notes	Original actor	Ref
2016–2018	The Man in the High Castle	Nobusuke Tagomi	Main cast (seasons 1–3)	Cary-Hiroyuki Tagawa	

==== Video games (Italian dub) ====
Year	Title	Role(s)	Ref
2020	Cyberpunk 2077	Goro Takemura	
