= Silver Samurai =

Marvel Comics character

- Kenuichio Harada as Silver Samurai in New Avengers #12 (December 2005). Art by David Finch.

Publication information
- Publisher: Marvel Comics
- First appearance: Kenuichio Harada: Daredevil #111 (July 1974); Shingen Yashida: Wolverine #1 (Sept. 1982)
- Created by: Steve Gerber; Bob Brown

In-story information
- Alter ego: Kenuichio Harada; Shingen "Shin" Harada
- Abilities: Master samurai and martial artist; Teleportation ring; Wears a lightweight steel alloy body armor; Extensive knowledge of criminal organizations; Wields katana, shuriken and other weapons; Ability to generate a tachyon field

Silver Samurai is the name of two characters appearing in American comic books published by Marvel Comics, both acquaintances of Wolverine.

The Silver Samurai identity has appeared in several animated series and video games related to the X-Men, and made its live-action debut in the 2013 film The Wolverine.

== Fictional character biography ==
=== Kenuichio Harada ===
Kenuichio Harada is the original Silver Samurai. The character first appeared in Daredevil #111 (July 1974), and was created by writer Steve Gerber and artist Bob Brown. A Japanese mutant who uses his powers to charge his katana and wears a samurai-style armor made of a silver-colored alloy, he is the illegitimate son of Lord Shingen, the half-brother of Mariko Yashida, a cousin of Sunfire and Sunpyre, and a nemesis of Wolverine. While he spent most of his existence as a villain, he eventually reformed into a more heroic figure.

=== Shingen "Shin" Harada ===
Shingen "Shin" Harada, the second Silver Samurai, is Kenuichio Harada's son and is named after Lord Shingen. Shin works with Mystique to track down newly awakened mutants to join a cause. He is recruited by Kade Kilgore to be a teacher at the Hellfire Club's Hellfire Academy, where he works as a designer. Silver Samurai later appears as a member of Mystique's fourth incarnation of the Brotherhood of Mutants.

Shingen Harada represents the Yashida Corporation during a meeting with fellow businesspeople Tiberius Stone, Wilson Fisk, Sebastian Shaw, Darren Cross, Zeke Stane, and Wilhelmina Kensington. The group discusses Dario Agger's plans to exploit the Ten Realms of Asgard. When the true motive of the meeting is revealed, Harada attacks Agger. Exterminatrix attacks the meeting and knocks out Agger.

Silver Samurai approaches Old Man Logan, wanting to ally in stopping the Hand's Regenix operation. He agrees in exchange for Mariko Yashida being spared. When Logan and Silver Samurai attack the Hand's Regenix operations, Silver Samurai battles Gorgon while Logan confronts Mariko. After Gorgon escapes, Silver Samurai injects nanites into Mariko to break the Hand's control over her. Logan and Mariko then send Silver Samurai to destroy the Regenix shipments in Madripoor.

== Reception ==
- In 2020, CBR.com ranked Silver Samurai 1st in their "Marvel Comics: Ranking Every Member Of Big Hero 6 From Weakest To Most Powerful" list.

== In other media ==
=== Television ===
- The Kenuichio Harada incarnation of Silver Samurai appears in the X-Men: The Animated Series episode "The Lotus and the Steel", voiced by Denis Akiyama.
  - Silver Samurai makes a non-speaking cameo appearance in the X-Men '97 three-part episode "Tolerance Is Extinction". Morph takes his form in "Weapon X, Lies and DVDs".
- The Kenuichio Harada incarnation of Silver Samurai appears in the Wolverine and the X-Men episode "Code of Conduct", voiced by Keone Young.
- The Kenuichio Harada incarnation of Silver Samurai appears in Marvel Disk Wars: The Avengers, voiced by Takanori Nishikawa in Japanese and Andrew Kishino in English.
- The Kenuichio Harada incarnation of Silver Samurai appears in Marvel's Hit-Monkey, voiced by Noshir Dalal.

=== Film ===
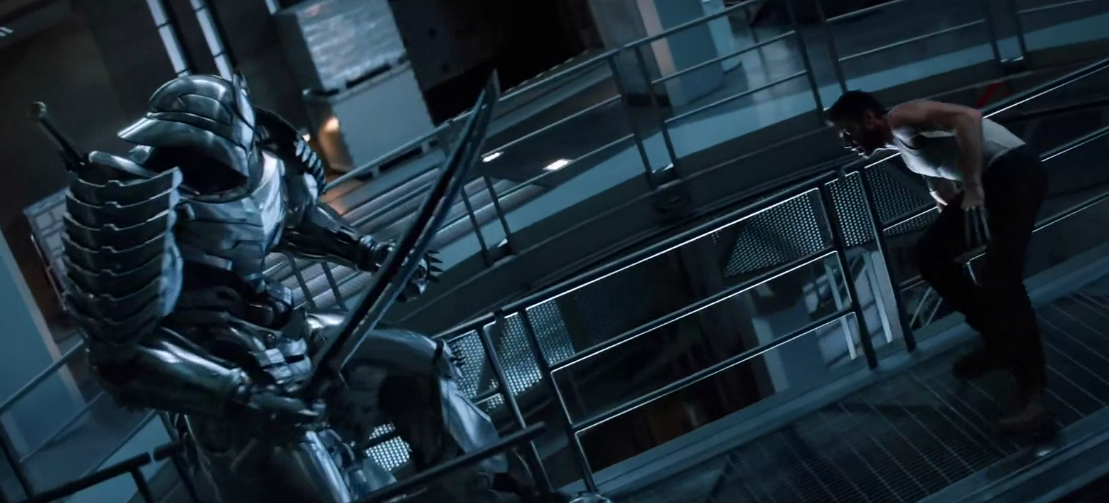
Silver Samurai fighting Logan in The Wolverine.

Variations of the Silver Samurai appear in The Wolverine (2013). The first is the Yashida clan's traditional samurai attire which is donned by Shingen Yashida (portrayed by Hiroyuki Sanada). The second is a giant powered exoskeleton made of adamantium operated by former soldier/billionaire Ichirō Yashida (portrayed by Haruhiko Yamanouchi as an old man and Ken Yamamura as a young man).

=== Video games ===
- The Kenuichio Harada incarnation of Silver Samurai appears as a playable character in X-Men: Children of the Atom, voiced by Yasushi Ikeda.
- The Kenuichio Harada incarnation of Silver Samurai appears as a playable character in Marvel vs. Capcom 2: New Age of Heroes, voiced again by Yasushi Ikeda.
- The Kenuichio Harada incarnation of Silver Samurai appears as a boss in X-Men: The Official Game, voiced by Keone Young.
- The Kenuichio Harada incarnation of Silver Samurai appears as an unlockable playable character in Lego Marvel Super Heroes, voiced by Andrew Kishino.
- The Kenuichio Harada incarnation of Silver Samurai appears as a playable character in Marvel Puzzle Quest.
- The Kenuichio Harada incarnation of Silver Samurai appears as a playable character in Marvel Contest of Champions.
- The Kenuichio Harada incarnation of Silver Samurai appears as a playable character in Marvel: Future Fight.
- The Kenuichio Harada incarnation of Silver Samurai appears as a playable card in Marvel Snap.
