= Rila Fukushima =

Japanese model and actress

- 福島 リラ
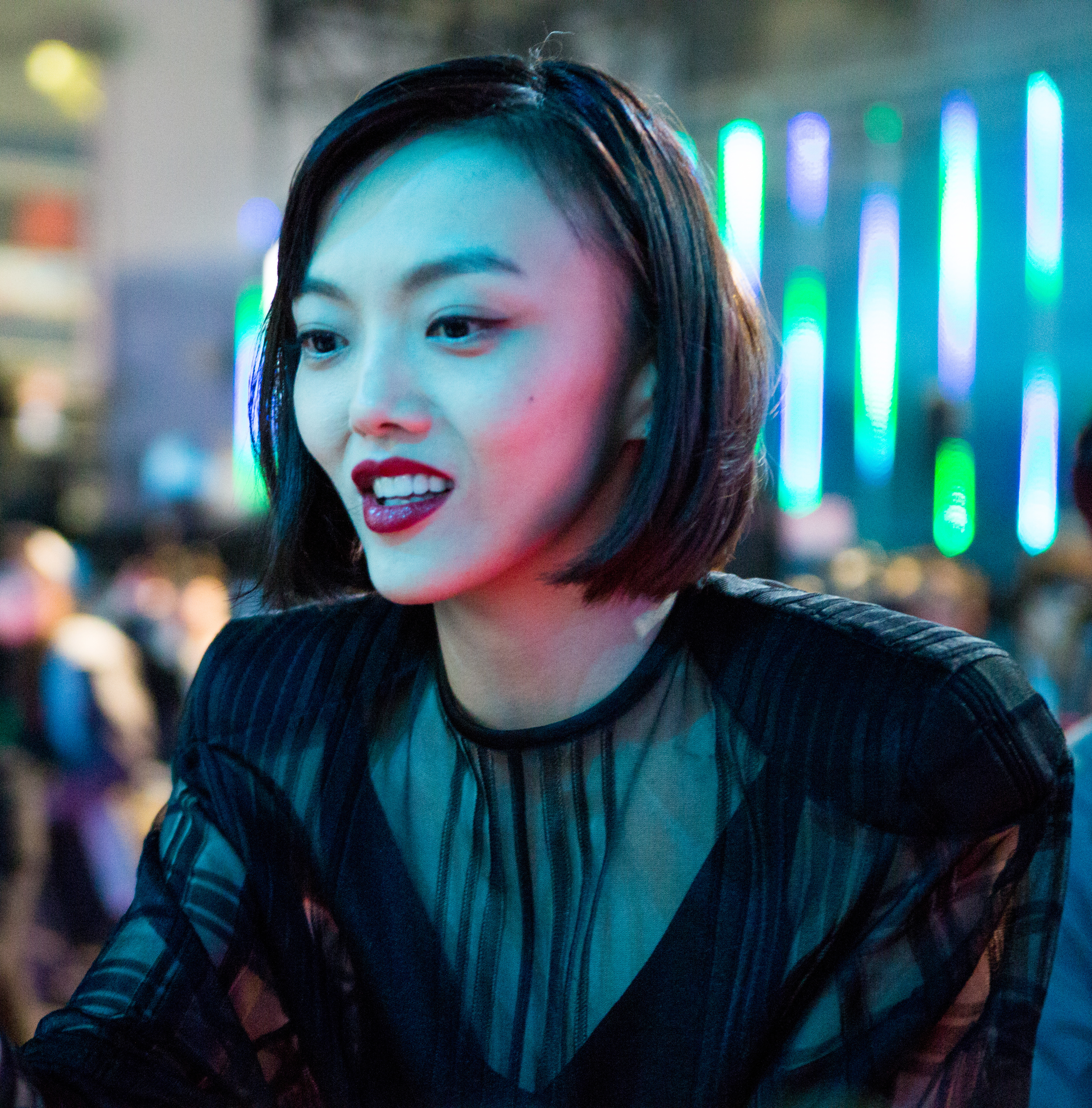
- Fukushima at the Ghost in the Shell world premiere red carpet, 2017
- Born: Tokyo, Japan
- Occupations: Model; actress
- Years active: 2012–present

Rila Fukushima (福島 リラ, Fukushima Rira) is a Japanese fashion-model and actress best known for her comic book roles in film and TV and has appeared in projects such as the superhero film The Wolverine (2013) as Yukio, the TV series Arrow as Tatsu Yamashiro, and Ghost in the Shell (2017) as the Red-robed Geisha.

== Life and career ==
Rila Fukushima was born in Tokyo, Japan.

Originally attempting to secure a position as a model agent at a Tokyo agency, she was persuaded to try modeling instead. Her career has included work for numerous labels and brands in various shows and campaigns.

Fukushima also starred in the 2013 superhero film The Wolverine as Yukio, and appeared in the 2014 Taiga drama Gunshi Kanbei as Omichi.

Fukushima spent a semester studying at the Tony-award winning theater, American Conservatory Theater, in Fall of 2017.

Fukushima replaced Devon Aoki in the role of Tatsu Yamashiro for the third season of The CW television show Arrow. In 2015, she appeared in the HBO series Game of Thrones in a season 5 episode as a Red Priestess in Volantis. She starred in Million Yen Women as Minami Shirakawa on Netflix.

She was chosen as one of the women of 2013 by Vogue Japan.

== Filmography ==
=== Films ===
Year	English title	Role	Notes	Source
2010	Karma: A Very Twisted Love Story	Rei	Short Movie	
2013	The Wolverine	Yukio		
2014	Twilight: Saya in Sasara	Erica		
2015	Gonin Saga	Yoichi		
2016	Terra Formars	Sakakibara		
2017	Ghost in the Shell	Red Robed Geisha		
2019	Listen to the Universe	Jennifer Chang		
2021	Annette	Nurse		
2023	Family			
2025	Ballerina	Petra		
2026	Hyoketsu			
TBA	The Degrees of Pain			

=== TV series ===
Year	English title	Role	Notes	Source
2014	Gunshi Kanbei	Omichi	Taiga drama	
2014	The Long Goodbye	Lily	Mini-Series	
2014–2019	Arrow	Tatsu Yamashiro	16 episodes	
2015	Game of Thrones	Red Priestess	Episode: "High Sparrow"	
2015	Warrior	Tasu	TV movie	
2017	Million Yen Women	Minami Shirakawa	12 episodes	
2018	Blindspot	Akiko	Episode: "Hella Duplicitous"	
2020	Castlevania	Sumi (voice)	8 episodes	
2020	S.W.A.T	Rio	Episode: "Ekitai Rashku"	
2025	Gannibal Season 2	Beni Gotō		
2026	Ultraman Teo	Kyoko Shiga	tokusatsu	
