= The Wolverine (film) =

2013 film by James Mangold

- Theatrical release poster
- Directed by: James Mangold
- Screenplay by: Mark Bomback; Scott Frank
- Based on: Wolverine by Chris Claremont; Frank Miller
- Produced by: Lauren Shuler Donner; Hutch Parker
- Starring: Hugh Jackman; Tao Okamoto; Hiroyuki Sanada; Famke Janssen; Haruhiko Yamanouchi
- Cinematography: Ross Emery
- Edited by: Michael McCusker
- Music by: Marco Beltrami
- Production companies: Marvel Entertainment; Donners' Company
- Distributed by: 20th Century Fox
- Release date: July 26, 2013 (United States)
- Running time: 126 minutes
- Countries: United States; United Kingdom (Note: Sources differ regarding the country or countries of origin of The Wolverine. Some indicate that the United States is the sole country of origin, while others list it as a co-production of the United States and Great Britain.)
- Languages: English; Japanese
- Budget: $100–132 million
- Box office: $414.8 million

The Wolverine is a 2013 superhero film based on the Marvel Comics character Wolverine. It is the sixth installment in the X-Men film series, a spin-off/sequel to X-Men: The Last Stand (2006), and the second Wolverine solo film following X-Men Origins: Wolverine (2009). The film was directed by James Mangold and written by Scott Frank and Mark Bomback. Hugh Jackman stars as Logan / Wolverine, alongside Tao Okamoto, Hiroyuki Sanada, Famke Janssen, and Haruhiko Yamanouchi. Following the events of X-Men: The Last Stand, Logan travels to Japan, where he engages an old acquaintance in a struggle that has lasting consequences. Stripped of his healing powers, Wolverine must battle deadly samurai while struggling with guilt over Jean Grey's death.

The film's development began in 2009 after the release of X-Men Origins: Wolverine. Christopher McQuarrie was hired to write a screenplay for The Wolverine in August 2009. In October 2010, Darren Aronofsky was hired to direct the film. The project was delayed following Aronofsky's departure and the Tōhoku earthquake and tsunami in March 2011. In June 2011, Mangold was brought on board to replace Aronofsky. Bomback was then hired to rewrite the screenplay in September 2011. The supporting characters were cast in July 2012 with principal photography beginning at the end of the month around New South Wales before moving to Tokyo in August 2012 and back to New South Wales in October 2012. The film was converted to 3D in post-production.

The Wolverine was released by 20th Century Fox in various international markets on July 24, 2013, and in the United States two days later. It received generally positive reviews from critics, with praise for its action sequences, production design, Jackman's performance, and thematic profundity, though criticism was directed towards the climax. The film grossed $414 million worldwide, making it the sixth-highest-grossing film in the series. A third film titled Logan was released on March 3, 2017.

== Plot ==
In August 1945, Logan is held in a Japanese POW camp near Nagasaki. During the city's atomic bombing, Logan saved an officer named Ichirō Yashida by shielding him from the blast.

In the present day, Logan has left the X-Men and lives as a hermit in the Yukon, tormented by hallucinations of Jean Grey, whom he was forced to kill to save the world. (Note: As depicted in X-Men: The Last Stand (2006)) He is located by Yukio, a mutant with the ability to foresee people's deaths, on behalf of Yashida, now the CEO of a technology zaibatsu. Yashida, who is dying of cancer, wants Logan to accompany Yukio to Japan so that he may repay his life debt. In Tokyo, Logan meets Yashida's son Shingen and granddaughter Mariko. There, Yashida offers to transfer Logan's healing abilities into his own body, thus saving Yashida's life and alleviating Logan of his near-immortality, which Logan views as a curse. Believing he is acting in Yashida's best interests, Logan refuses and prepares to leave the following day. That night, Yashida's physician Dr. Green poisons Logan while he sleeps, but Logan dismisses it as a dream.

The next morning, Yukio informs Logan that Yashida has died. At the funeral, the Yakuza attempts to kidnap Mariko, but Logan and Mariko escape together into the urban sprawl of Tokyo. Logan is shot, and his wounds do not heal as quickly as they should. After fighting off more Yakuza on a bullet train, Logan and Mariko hide in a local love hotel. Meanwhile, Yashida's bodyguard Harada meets with Dr. Green, who, after demonstrating her mutant powers on him, demands he find Logan and Mariko. Logan and Mariko travel to Yashida's house in Nagasaki, and the two fall in love. Meanwhile, Yukio has a vision of Logan dying and goes to warn him. Before Yukio arrives, Mariko is captured by the Yakuza. After interrogating one of the kidnappers, Logan and Yukio confront Mariko's fiancé, corrupt Minister of Justice Noburo Mori. Mori confesses that he conspired with Shingen to have the Yakuza kidnap Mariko because Ichirō left control of the company to Mariko and not Shingen.

Mariko is brought before Shingen at Yashida's estate when ninjas led by Harada attack and whisk her away. Logan and Yukio arrive later and, using Yashida's X-ray machine, discover a robotic parasite attached to Logan's heart, suppressing his healing ability. Logan cuts himself open and extracts the device. During the operation, Shingen attacks, but Yukio holds him off long enough for Logan to recover and kill him. Logan follows Mariko's trail to the village of Yashida's birth, where Harada's ninjas capture him. Logan is placed in a machine by Dr. Green, who reveals her plans to extract his healing factor and introduces him to the Silver Samurai, an electromechanical suit of Japanese armor with energized katanas made of adamantium. Mariko escapes from Harada, who believes he is acting in Mariko's interests, and manages to free Logan from the machine. Harada sees the error of his ways but is killed by the Silver Samurai while helping Logan escape.

Meanwhile, Yukio arrives and kills Dr. Green. As Logan fights the Silver Samurai, it severs Logan's adamantium claws and begins to extract his healing abilities, revealing himself to be Yashida, who had faked his death. Yashida regains his youth, but Mariko intervenes and stabs Yashida with Logan's severed claws. Logan regenerates his bone claws and kills Yashida by throwing him from a platform. Logan collapses and has one final hallucination of Jean, in which he decides to finally let her go. Mariko becomes CEO of Yashida Industries and bids Logan farewell as he prepares to leave Japan. Yukio vows to stay by Logan's side as his bodyguard, and they depart to places unknown.

In a mid-credits scene, Logan returns to the United States two years later and is approached at the airport by Erik Lehnsherr, who warns him of a weapon (Note: Later revealed to be the Sentinels in X-Men: Days of Future Past (2014)) humans are creating that would bring an end to the mutant race. Logan refuses to believe him until Charles Xavier, who was presumed dead, reveals himself to be working alongside Lehnsherr.

== Cast ==
- Hugh Jackman as Logan / Wolverine: A mutant and former member of the X-Men, whose prodigious healing abilities and adamantium infused skeleton combine to make him virtually immortal.
- Tao Okamoto as Mariko Yashida: Yashida's granddaughter, whose life becomes threatened as a result of her grandfather's will.
- Rila Fukushima as Yukio: A mutant who has precognitive abilities and one of the deadliest assassins in Yashida's clan.
- Svetlana Khodchenkova as Viper / Dr. Green: A mutant working for Yashida who can expel toxins from her mouth.
- Brian Tee as Noburo Mori: A corrupt minister of justice, who is engaged to Mariko.
- Will Yun Lee as Kenuichio Harada: A former lover of Mariko and head of the Black Ninja Clan, sworn to protect the Yashida family.
- Hiroyuki Sanada as Shingen Yashida: Yashida's son as well as Mariko's father and corporate rival, who is proficient in kendo.
- Famke Janssen as Jean Grey: A mutant, former member and former medical doctor of the X-Men who was killed by Logan. She appears as a hallucination to Logan throughout the film.
- Haruhiko Yamanouchi as Ichiro Yashida: Shingen's father, Mariko's grandfather and the founder of Yashida Industries, a powerful technology zaibatsu. Yashida is based on the comic characters Silver Samurai and Ogun.
  - Ken Yamamura portrays a young Yashida in the film's opening scene during the atomic bombing of Nagasaki.

Archive audio of Lynn Collins from X-Men Origins: Wolverine is used to represent her character Kayla Silverfox during a dream being had by Logan, while Patrick Stewart and Ian McKellen reprise their roles as Professor Charles Xavier and Erik Lehnsherr / Magneto in cameo appearances during the mid-credits scene. Halle Berry appears as Storm in a still image.

== Production ==
=== Development ===
"There are so many areas of that Japanese story, I love the idea of this kind of anarchic character, the outsider, being in this world—I can see it aesthetically, too—full of honor and tradition and customs and someone who's really anti-all of that, and trying to negotiate his way. The idea of the samurai, too—and the tradition there. It's really great. In the comic book, he gets his ass kicked by a couple of samurai—not even mutants. He's shocked by that at first".

— Hugh Jackman

In September 2007, Gavin Hood, director of X-Men Origins: Wolverine, speculated that there would be a sequel, which would be set in Japan. During one of the post-credits scenes of the film, Logan / Wolverine is seen drinking at a bar in Japan. Such a location was the subject of Chris Claremont and Frank Miller's 1982 limited series on the character, which was not in the first film as Hugh Jackman felt "what we need to do is establish who [Logan] is and find out how he became Wolverine". Jackman stated the Claremont-Miller series is his favorite Wolverine story. Of the Japanese arc, Jackman also stated, "I won't lie to you, I have been talking to writers... I'm a big fan of the Japanese saga in the comic book". During filming of X-Men Origins: Wolverine, Jackman assured Kevin Durand that he would come back as Fred J. Dukes / The Blob in the sequel, with his character now being the sumo wrestling champion of Japan when Wolverine visits Tokyo, but these plans never panned out as Durand reflected in 2024. Before X-Men Origins: Wolverine's release, Lauren Shuler Donner approached Simon Beaufoy to write the script, but he did not feel confident enough to commit. By May 4, 2009, Jackman's company Seed Productions was preparing several projects, including a sequel to X-Men Origins: Wolverine to be set in Japan, but neither Jackman nor Seed has a production credit on the completed 2013 sequel. On May 5, 2009, just days after the opening weekend of X-Men Origins: Wolverine, the sequel was officially confirmed.

Christopher McQuarrie, who went uncredited for his work on X-Men, was hired to write the screenplay for the Wolverine sequel in August 2009. According to Shuler-Donner, the sequel would focus on the relationship between Wolverine and Mariko, the daughter of a Japanese crime lord, and what happens to him in Japan. Wolverine would have a different fighting style due to Mariko's father having "this stick-like weapon. There'll be samurai, ninja, katana blades, different forms of martial arts—mano-a-mano, extreme fighting". She continued: "We want to make it authentic so I think it's very likely we'll be shooting in Japan. I think it's likely the characters will speak English rather than Japanese with subtitles". In January 2010, at the People's Choice Awards, Jackman stated that the film would start shooting sometime in 2011, and in March 2010, McQuarrie declared that the screenplay was finished for production to start in January the following year. Sources indicated Darren Aronofsky was in negotiations to direct the film after Bryan Singer turned down the offer.

=== Pre-production ===
"If you have a hero who can't be hurt, there's only one way to create stakes or jeopardy, and that's to put people he cares about in harm's way. And, not unlike the amnesia thing, that can get tired really fast... I think there's so much to mine in Logan without robbing him of self-knowledge. What I wanted to present to the audience was, what is it like to feel a prisoner in a life you cannot escape? You accumulate pain and loss, and keep that with you as you keep on going".

— James Mangold

In October 2010, Jackman confirmed that Aronofsky would direct the film. Jackman commented that with Aronofsky directing, Wolverine 2 will not be "usual" stating, "This is, hopefully for me, going to be out of the box. It's going to be the best one, I hope... Well, I would say that, but I really do feel that, and I feel this is going to be very different. This is Wolverine. This is not Popeye. He's kind of dark... But, you know, this is a change of pace. Chris McQuarrie, who wrote The Usual Suspects, has written the script, so that'll give you a good clue. [Aronofsky's] going to make it fantastic. There's going to be some meat on the bones. There will be something to think about as you leave the theater, for sure". The film was scheduled to begin principal photography in March 2011 in New York City before the production moves to Japan for the bulk of shooting.

While Jackman in 2008 had characterized the film as "a sequel to Origins", Aronofsky in November 2010 said the film, now titled The Wolverine, was a "one-off" rather than a sequel. Also in November, Fox Filmed Entertainment sent out a press release stating that they have signed Aronofsky and his production company Protozoa Pictures to a new two-year, overall deal. Under the deal, Protozoa would develop and produce films for both 20th Century Fox and Fox Searchlight Pictures. Aronofsky's debut picture under the pact would have been The Wolverine.

In March 2011, Aronofsky bowed out of directing the film, saying in a statement, "As I talked more about the film with my collaborators at Fox, it became clear that the production of The Wolverine would keep me out of the country for almost a year... I was not comfortable being away from my family for that length of time. I am sad that I won't be able to see the project through, as it is a terrific script and I was very much looking forward to working with my friend, Hugh Jackman, again". Fox also decided to be "in no rush" to start the production due to the damage incurred in Japan by the 2011 Tōhoku earthquake and tsunami. Despite this, Jackman said the project was moving ahead. "It's too early to call on Japan, I'm not sure where they're at. So now we're finding another director, but Fox is very anxious to make the movie and we're moving ahead full steam to find another director".

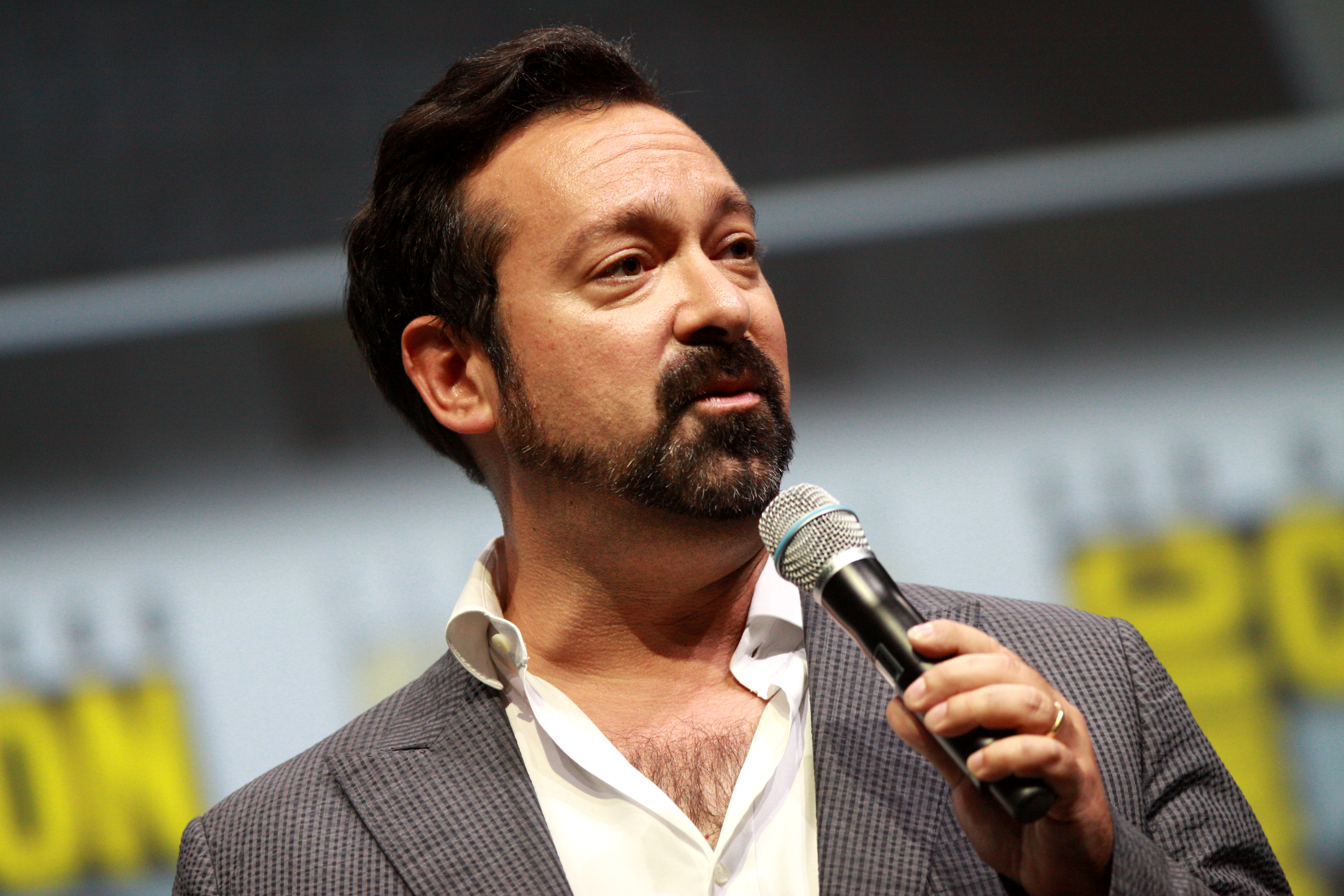
Director James Mangold at the 2013 San Diego Comic-Con

In May 2011, Fox had a list of eight candidates to replace Aronofsky, including directors José Padilha, Doug Liman, Antoine Fuqua, Mark Romanek, Justin Lin, Gavin O'Connor, James Mangold and Gary Shore. Shawn Levy, who eventually directed Jackman as Wolverine in the Marvel Cinematic Universe (MCU) film Deadpool & Wolverine, was approached by Jackman to direct The Wolverine while filming Real Steel, but Levy declined because he wanted to do original films and knew that it would be Jackman's fifth time playing Wolverine. In June 2011, Fox entered negotiations with Mangold and intended to start principal photography in fall 2011. In July 2011, Jackman said he planned to begin filming in October and that he would fight the Silver Samurai.

In August 2011, The Vancouver Sun reported that filming would take place from November 11, 2011, to March 1, 2012, at the Canadian Motion Picture Park in Burnaby, British Columbia. Almost immediately, filming was postponed to spring 2012 so Jackman could work on Les Misérables. In September, Mark Bomback was hired to rewrite McQuarrie's script. At one point, Bomback tried to work Rogue into the script, but he rejected it for being "goofy" and "problematic". In February 2012, a July 26, 2013, release date was set, and in April, filming was set to begin in August 2012 in Australia, which would serve as the primary location due to financial and tax incentives.

In July 2012, actors Hiroyuki Sanada, Hal Yamanouchi, Tao Okamoto and Rila Fukushima had been cast as Shingen, Ichirō, Mariko and Yukio, respectively. Additionally, Will Yun Lee was cast as Harada, and Brian Tee as Noburo Mori. By July 2012, Deadline Hollywood said Jessica Biel would play Viper. However, at the 2012 San Diego Comic-Con, Biel said her role in the film was "not a done deal", explaining, "People keep talking about this. I don't know anything about it. It's a little bit too soon for that kind of an announcement". A few days later, negotiations between Biel and 20th Century Fox had broken down. Later in July, Fox had begun talks with Svetlana Khodchenkova to take over the role. Somewhat unusually for action movies, The Wolverine features four female lead roles and "passes the Bechdel Test early and often", according to Vulture. Mangold noted that he wrote his heroines so that "they all have missions. They all have jobs to do other than be the object of affection", intent of avoiding the "worn out" trope of the woman in jeopardy. Jackman and Mangold were hoping to make the film R rated, but the studio rejected it.

In terms of his character, Jackman views Wolverine as "the ultimate outsider" and that "the great battle, I always thought with Wolverine, is the battle within himself". Regarding Logan's struggle with extreme longevity, Jackman said, "He realizes everyone he loves dies, and his whole life is full of pain. So it's better that he just escapes. He can't die really. He just wants to get away from everything". Jackman stated that he ate six meals a day in preparation for the role. Jackman contacted Dwayne Johnson for some tips on bulking up for the film, suggesting that he gain a pound a week by eating 6,000 calories a day for six months which consisted of "an awful lot of chicken, steak and brown rice".

In August 2012, Guillermo del Toro revealed he had been interested in directing the film, as the Japanese arc was his favorite Wolverine story. After meeting with Jim Gianopulos and Jackman, del Toro passed, deciding he did not wish to spend two to three years of his life working on the movie.

=== Filming ===
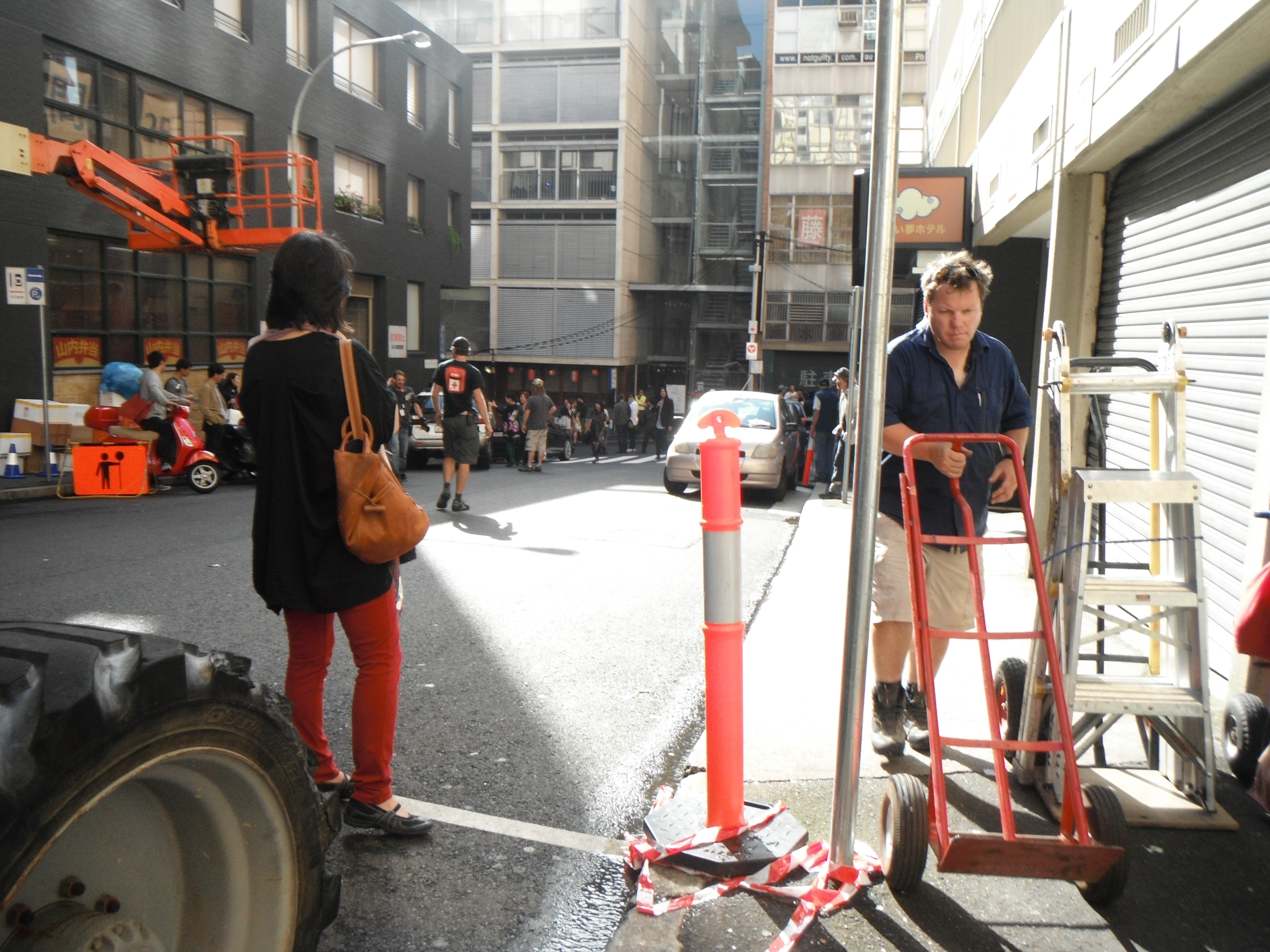
Crew of The Wolverine working on the film set in Surry Hills, Sydney

On a production budget of $120 million, principal photography began on July 30, 2012. Shuler Donner had to be absent through most of the production due to breast cancer, with her treatment ending just before post-production begun. Some of the earliest scenes were shot at the Bonna Point Reserve in Kurnell, New South Wales, which doubled as a Japanese prisoner-of-war camp. Filming there ended on August 2, 2012, with production scheduled to continue around Sydney followed by a few weeks in Japan before wrapping up in mid-November. On August 3, 2012, production moved to Picton, which doubled as a town in Canada's Yukon region. Mangold would say that the lack of the Japanese film commission was why the film wasn't entirely in Japan.

On August 25, 2012, Mangold said that production moved to Tokyo and began shooting. On September 4, 2012, filming took place outside Fukuyama Station in Fukuyama, Hiroshima. Filming in Tomonoura, a port in the Ichichi ward of Fukuyama, concluded on September 11, 2012.

On October 8, 2012, production returned to Sydney with filming on Erskine Street near Cockle Bay. The following week, the film shot in Parramatta, which doubled as a Japanese city. Also in October, Mangold revealed that the film follows the events of X-Men: The Last Stand, saying, "Where this film sits in the universe of the films is after them all. Jean Grey is gone, most of the X-Men are disbanded or gone, so there's a tremendous sense of isolation for [Wolverine]". He elaborated that his decision to have The Wolverine take place after The Last Stand without making it a direct sequel to that film stemmed from the simplicity of setting the story after the huge amount of adventures Wolverine has endured throughout the film series the possibility of choosing a perfect moment for Logan to be stripped of both his heroic duties and his sense of purpose like a rōnin due to several of his fellow X-Men dying in the third X-Men film, allowing him to live in a "separate" world that doesn't necessarily need to tie-in with the next film to allow for more creative freedom, and finding himself in an existential crisis due to his immortality, which Mangold felt that it sounded in accordance to the themes of the original arc by Claremont and Miller. Mangold later stated that in the fight scenes, "there's an urgency and a kind of intensity and hand to hand physicality that I hope is a little different than everything else out there". On October 25, 2012, production relocated to Sydney Olympic Park in western Sydney. The set was made into a Japanese village draped in snow with filming beginning on November 1, 2012. On November 10, 2012, filming took place on a back street in Surry Hills. The set, constructed on Brisbane St., was transformed to look like a Japanese street with Japanese signage and vehicles scattered throughout. Principal photography concluded on November 21, 2012.

Reshoots took place in Montréal, including the credits scene where Magneto and Professor X warn Wolverine of a new threat. Said scene was contributed by Bryan Singer and Simon Kinberg, writers of X-Men: Days of Future Past, as a way to "reintroduce Patrick Stewart into the universe" and set up their film. Mangold stated that while production of The Wolverine started before Days of Future Past and thus the film was mostly focused on being a self-contained story, he was able to collaborate with Singer to "make things groove together".

=== Post-production ===
Original plate (top), animation pass (center), and the completed shot (bottom) of the Silver Samurai

In October 2012, it was reported that The Wolverine would be converted to 3D, making it the first 3D release for one of 20th Century Fox's Marvel films. Visual effects for the film were completed by Weta Digital, Rising Sun Pictures (RSP), Iloura, and Shade VFX.

In order to recreate the atomic bombing of Nagasaki, RSP studied natural phenomena such as volcanoes, instead of relying on archived footage of atomic blasts, and recreated the effects digitally. They also replaced the Sydney cityscape on the horizon with views of Nagasaki. The walking bear featured in the Yukon scenes was created with computer graphics by Weta Digital, while Make-Up Effects Group built a 12-foot-tall animatronic bear, that was used for shots of the creature dying after it had been hit by poisoned arrows fired by hunters.

For a fight scene taking place on top of a speeding bullet train, the actors and stunt performers filmed on wires above a set piece surrounded by a greenscreen. The moving background, filmed on an elevated freeway in Tokyo, was added later. Weta Digital visual effects supervisor Martin Hill said the team adopted a "Google Street View method", explaining "But instead of having a big panoramic cam on top of a van, we built a rig that had eight 45-degree angle Red Epic [cameras] that gave us massive resolution driving down all the massive lanes of the freeway. We let a bit of air out of the tires of the van and kept a constant 60 kilometers an hour. So if we shot at 48 fps we just needed to speed up the footage by 10 times to give us the 300 kilometers an hour required".

The Silver Samurai, rendered by Weta Digital, was based on a model that had been 3D printed and chrome painted using electrolysis. Stunt performer Shane Rangi, wearing a motion capture suit, stood on stilts while filming as the Silver Samurai. Rangi's performance was then used to animate the digital character. Hill said the main challenge was creating the Silver Samurai's highly reflective surface, "He's pretty much chrome. We were worried that he was going to look incredibly digital and that it was going to be very hard to make him look solid and real and not just like a mirrored surface".

The original assembly cut of the film ran around two hours and 35 minutes. The mid-credit scene was written by Simon Kinberg and shot by the X-Men: Days of Future Past crew, though Mangold directed the scene.

== Music ==
In September 2012, Marco Beltrami, who previously scored James Mangold's film 3:10 to Yuma (2007), announced that he had signed on to score The Wolverine. Following Mangold's noir and Spaghetti Western inspirations for the film, Beltrami explained, "I think I do every movie as a western whether it is or not, so there's definitely some of the spaghetti western influence on my music throughout the score, and I guess throughout a lot of my work. I wouldn't say there was a particular movie that influenced me more than something else. There was nothing that I was trying to mimic or anything." On associating sounds with the film's primary location, Beltrami said, "I think the last thing that Jim [Mangold] and I wanted to do was Japanese music associated with Japanese places. There's a reference; I do use Japanese instruments, [but] not really in a traditional way." The score was performed by an 85-piece ensemble of the Hollywood Studio Symphony at the Newman Scoring Stage located at 20th Century Fox Studios. The album was released by Sony Classical Records on July 23, 2013.

== Release ==
=== Theatrical ===
The Wolverine was released on July 24, 2013, in various international markets, and in the United States two days later. The film was titled Wolverine: Immortal in Brazil and Spanish-language markets. The film premiered in Japan on September 13, 2013, under the title Wolverine: Samurai (ウルヴァリン: SAMURAI, Uruvarin Samurai).

=== Marketing ===
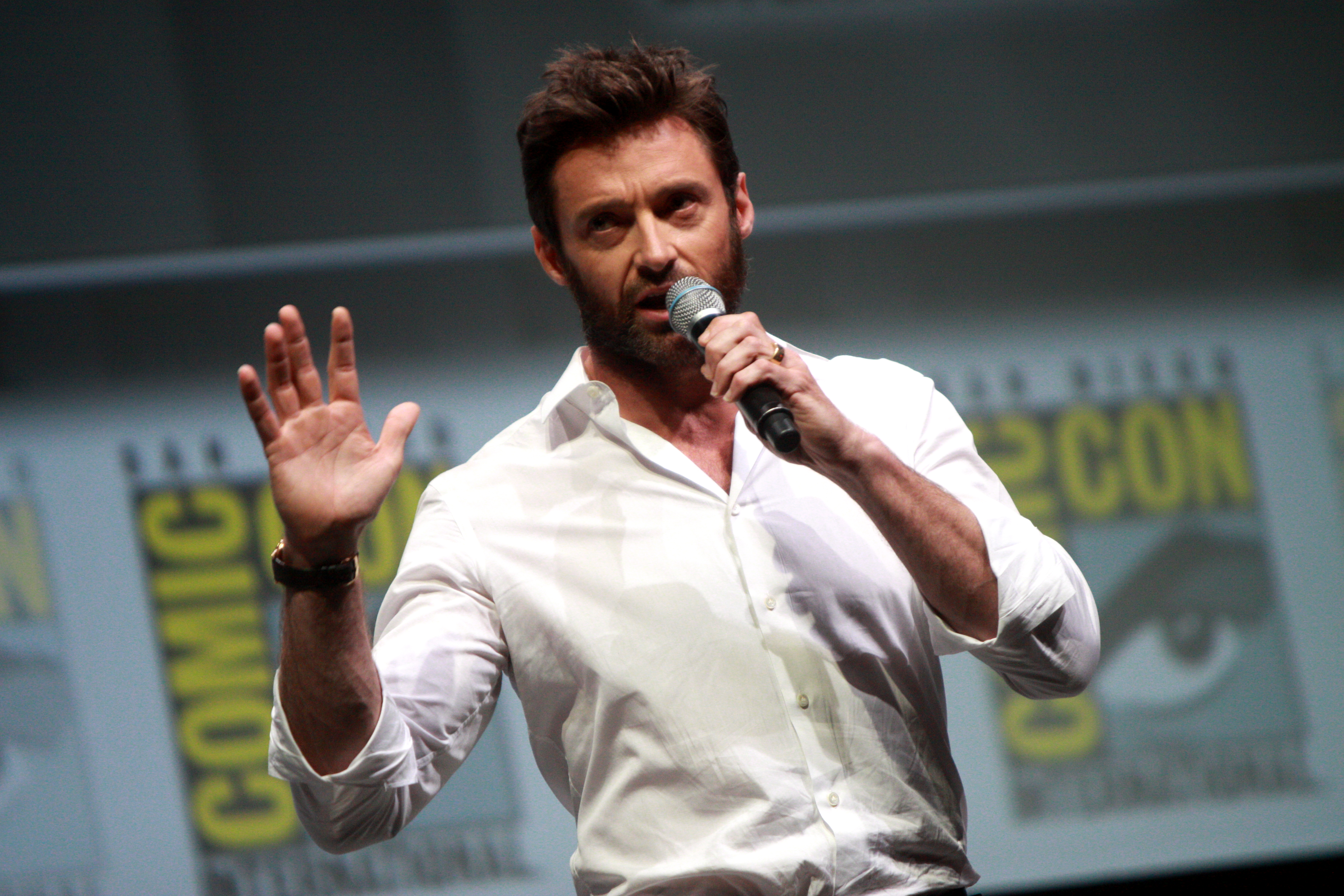
Hugh Jackman promoting the film at the 2013 San Diego Comic-Con

On October 29, 2012, director James Mangold and actor Jackman hosted a live chat from the set of the film. The chat took place on the official website and the official YouTube account of the film.

The first American trailer and international trailer of The Wolverine were released on March 27, 2013. Empire magazine said "This is all very encouraging stuff from director James Mangold, a man who's obviously not afraid of tweaking the original source material to serve his own ends." The trailer was later attached to G.I. Joe: Retaliation. The second American trailer was then released on April 18, 2013, and was screened at CinemaCon in Las Vegas.

The third American trailer was released on May 21, 2013, and then on June 13, 2013, the second international trailer was released.

On July 20, 2013, 20th Century Fox presented The Wolverine along with Dawn of the Planet of the Apes and X-Men: Days of Future Past to the 2013 San Diego Comic-Con with Jackman and Mangold in attendance to present new footage of the film.

20th Century Fox partnered with automotive company Audi to promote the film with their sports car Audi R8 and their motorcycle Ducati. Other partners included sugar-free chewing-gum brand 5 and casual dining restaurant company Red Robin.

=== Home media ===
The Wolverine was released on DVD, Blu-ray, and Blu-ray 3D on December 3, 2013, by 20th Century Fox Home Entertainment. The Blu-ray set features an exclusive unrated extended cut of the film referred to as the "Unleashed Extended Edition". This version of the film was screened for the first time at 20th Century Fox Studios on November 19, 2013. It contains 12 extra minutes, primarily including an extended battle with Harada's ninjas during the start of the film's third act as well as additional footage during moments of character interaction. The BBFC gives its running time as 132 minutes and 22 seconds, only six minutes longer.

== Reception ==
=== Box office ===
The Wolverine outgrossed Origins in total box office, though earned less domestically. The film closed in US theaters on December 5, 2013, grossing $133 million North America (as opposed to $180 million the earlier film) and $282 million in other territories (as opposed to the earlier film's $193 million), for a worldwide total of $415 million. The film earned $140 million on its worldwide opening weekend. When compared to the rest of the X-Men film franchise, The Wolverine was in the middle in terms of box office success. While its domestic gross is greater than the production budget, it is still lower than the other five films of the franchise, with its domestic box office total being roughly $45.1 million less than the franchise's average. Its overseas total exceeds the franchise's average by roughly $75.7 million and is significantly more than any of the other X-Men films. With a worldwide total of $415 million, The Wolverine was at that time the third-highest-grossing film.

In North America, the film opened at the top of the box office on its opening day, with $20.7 million, with $4 million coming from Thursday late-night showings. It held on to the number one spot through its first weekend, with $53,113,752, which was the lowest opening of the series until 2019's Dark Phoenix was released.

Outside North America, the film topped the box office on its opening weekend with $86.5 million from 100 countries. The film achieved the highest opening of the franchise, passing X-Men: The Last Stand's $76.2 million opening.

=== Critical response ===
On review aggregator Rotten Tomatoes it has an approval rating of 71% with an average rating of 6.3/10 based on 259 reviews. The website's consensus reads, "Although its final act succumbs to the usual cartoonish antics, The Wolverine is one superhero movie that manages to stay true to the comics while keeping casual viewers entertained." On Metacritic, the film has a score of 61 out of 100, based on reviews from 46 critics, indicating "generally favorable" reviews. Audiences polled by CinemaScore gave the film an average grade of "A−", on a scale from A+ to F.

Richard Roeper of the Chicago Sun-Times gave it a grade of "B+", praising Jackman's performance as "strong, solid entertainment" and "a serious, sometimes dark and deliberately paced story." Christy Lemire, writing for the website of Roger Ebert, said that the film "features some breathtakingly suspenseful action sequences, exquisite production and costume design and colorful characters, some of whom register more powerfully than others." Variety film critic Peter Debruge called the film "an entertaining and surprisingly existential digression from his usual X-Men exploits. Though Wolvie comes across a bit world-weary and battle-worn by now, Jackman is in top form, taking the opportunity to test the character's physical and emotional extremes. Fans might've preferred bigger action or more effects, but Mangold does them one better, recovering the soul of a character whose near-immortality made him tiresome." James Buchanan of TV Guide.com gave it three out of four stars, calling it "A rare comic-to-film adaptation that doesn't sacrifice substance for the sake of thrilling action."

Scott Collura of IGN praised the film giving it an 8.5 out of 10 and stated, "The Wolverine is a stand alone adventure for the classic character that reminds us that there's more to this genre than universe-building and crossovers. ... [The] story paints a deep and compelling portrait of Logan, a haunted character that Jackman still finds new ways to play all these years later." Peter Travers of Rolling Stone felt that despite the film's final act "sink[ing] into CGI shit", Jackman's performance "still has the juice" and Mangold's directing "shows style and snap."

Henry Barnes of The Guardian gave the film a negative review, giving it two out of five stars and stating, "Hugh Jackman's sixth time out in the claws and hair combo is looking increasingly wearied, as the backstory gets more complicated and the action gets duller and flatter." Joe Neumaier of the New York Daily News offered a similar view, saying "Hugh Jackman has the role of the mutant superhero down pat, but the rest of the film is the same old slice and dice."

A common critique towards the film were aspects of the final act, particular in regard to the climactic fight with Silver Samurai and the Viper character. When promoting Logan, Mangold acknowledged the criticism, remarking that while The Wolverine was meant as a small scale, more intimate film, the studio wanted "big, CG action" to stay afloat with the other big blockbusters that came out that year such as Thor: The Dark World (2013) and Man of Steel (2013).

=== Legacy ===
Following the release of The Wolverine, 20th Century Fox had begun negotiations with both Jackman and Mangold to return for another Wolverine movie. Mangold was scheduled to write the treatment, with Lauren Shuler Donner returning to produce. On March 20, 2014, Fox announced that the sequel would be released March 3, 2017.

In retrospective reviews, several film critics such as Matthew Razak from Flixist, Alex Wench from Inverse, and Matthew Mosley from Collider have stated that The Wolverine is the most underrated superhero movie of all time, while also noting its later influence and similarities with Logan. Wench from Inverse wrote "what they ended up getting is a film that stands as one of the most contemplative superhero movies ever made. The film digs deep into the mind of Wolverine, giving Jackman the chance to put his investment in the character on full display. In that way, The Wolverine ends up being the perfect lead-in to 2017's Logan, a film that not only sees Mangold and Jackman working together again but also revisiting and perfecting everything they did and didn't do right in their previous collaboration."

In a ranking of the X-Men film series, Entertainment Weekly ranked the film in ninth place, writing "a deceptively small-scale crime thriller with a propulsive B-movie sensibility and a mournful sincerity that makes other blockbusters look plastic by comparison." Further adding "I've come around on the samurai-borg, and I think The Wolverine succeeds as a legitimate pulp adventure, with a great ensemble cast and action that feel uniquely gravitational in a typically greenscreen-y franchise."

=== Accolades ===
List of awards and nominations
| Year | Award / Film Festival | Category | Recipients | Result | Ref. |
|---|---|---|---|---|---|
| 2013 | Hollywood Film Awards | Hollywood Movie Award | James Mangold | Nominated | |
| 2014 | People's Choice Awards | Favorite Action Movie | The Wolverine | Nominated | |
| 2014 | People's Choice Awards | Favorite Movie Actor | Hugh Jackman (also for Prisoners) | Nominated | |
| 2014 | Screen Actors Guild Awards | Outstanding Performance by a Stunt Ensemble in a Motion Picture | The Wolverine | Nominated | |
| 2014 | Kids' Choice Awards | Favorite Male Buttkicker | Hugh Jackman | Nominated | |
| 2014 | Saturn Awards | Best Comic-To-Film Motion Picture | The Wolverine | Nominated | |

== Sequel ==
By October 2013, 20th Century Fox had begun negotiations with both Jackman and Mangold to return for a previously untitled installment. Mangold was scheduled to write the treatment, with Lauren Shuler Donner returning to produce. On March 20, 2014, Fox announced that the sequel would be released March 3, 2017. David James Kelly was hired to write the script, and Jackman was set to reprise his role as Wolverine. By the following month, screenwriter Michael Green was attached to the film. Mangold tweeted that filming would start in early 2016. Patrick Stewart said in August 2015 that he will reprise his role as Charles Xavier. Liev Schreiber, who portrayed Victor Creed in X-Men Origins: Wolverine, said in February 2016 that he was in talks to reprise his role in the sequel. By April 2016, Boyd Holbrook had been cast as head of security for a global enterprise set against Wolverine, and Richard E. Grant as a "mad scientist type". Simon Kinberg that month said the film will be set in the future. Toward the end of the month, Stephen Merchant was cast as Caliban. In May 2016, Eriq La Salle and Elise Neal were cast in unspecified roles. In May, Kinberg said filming had started and that he planned it to be an R-rated movie. Shiori Kutsuna was later cast as a younger version of Yukio in Deadpool 2, replacing Rila Fukushima.
