= Yukio (comics) =

Fictional character in the Marvel Universe

- Yukio. Art by Marc Silvestri.

Publication information
- Publisher: Marvel Comics
- First appearance: Wolverine #1 (September 1982)
- Created by: Chris Claremont; Frank Miller

In-story information
- Full name: Yukio (last name unknown)
- Team affiliations: Mutant Underground; X-Force; X-Men
- Partnerships: Gambit; Wolverine; Storm; Amiko Kobayashi; Mariko Yashida
- Abilities: Superior armed and unarmed fighting abilities; Accuracy with weapons; Genius-level intellect; Death Sense

Yukio (雪緒) is a superhero appearing in American comic books published by Marvel Comics. She is a female ninja of Japanese origin and a supporting character of the X-Men, particularly associated with Wolverine.

In live-action media, Yukio was adapted to the film The Wolverine (2013), played by Rila Fukushima. An unrelated superhero named Yukio appeared in the films Deadpool 2 (2018) and Deadpool & Wolverine (2024), played by Shioli Kutsuna and created by Rhett Reese, Paul Wernick, and Ryan Reynolds. This second Yukio was adapted to Marvel Comics as a new character with the same first name: Yuki "Yukio" ("Yuki O.") Ohara, the girlfriend of Negasonic Teenage Warhead.

== Publication history ==
Yukio's first full appearance was in Wolverine #1 (September 1982), created by writer Chris Claremont and artist Frank Miller.

== Character history ==
The X-Men's first encounter with Yukio occurred when Wolverine had his struggle with Shingen Yashida, father of Wolverine's girlfriend Mariko Yashida. At that time Yukio worked for Shingen, and one of her tasks was to kill Wolverine. Instead she developed a crush on him and subsequently aided him in bringing about Shingen's downfall.

Later, Wolverine invited his team to Japan for his wedding to Mariko, which Yukio joined subsequently. Viper and Silver Samurai poisoned the X-Men during a dinner that Logan hosted for them. Logan, tasting the poison, warned Ororo and knocked the cup from her hand before she could drink it. While the others were recuperating from the attack, Storm, Wolverine, Rogue (who had been largely unaffected), and Yukio went after Viper and Silver Samurai to stop his plot to assassinate Mariko, who was his half-sister. Yukio posed as a decoy, disguising herself as Mariko to lead them away from her. During their altercation with Viper and Silver Samurai, Storm found her powers inexplicably going out of control, endangering her life. Yukio knocked Storm into the nearby bay, enabling them to escape from Silver Samurai. These events had actually been brought about and influenced by the mutant villain Mastermind, who was conducting a revenge campaign against the X-Men at the time. He was also responsible for the subsequent halting of Wolverine's and Mariko's wedding. Storm, inspired by what she called Yukio's "madness" and lust for life, changed her image dramatically and adopted a new look: a mohawk haircut, studded collar, and black leather clothing.

Yukio later met up, once again, with Wolverine to help him fight the ninja master Ogun. She developed a rivalry with the X-Man Gambit: Both being thieves, they often tried to steal the same object. Yukio once framed Gambit for a crime she committed. Yukio is also part of Professor X's secret information network of humans and mutants, known as the Mutant Underground.

After the death of Mariko Yashida, Wolverine sent his adopted daughter, Amiko Kobayashi, to a foster family. He later discovered that her new foster parents were abusive and only interested in the money. Wolverine took Amiko away from them and asked Yukio to raise her. This unofficial adoption was under the protection of the Silver Samurai, now an ally of Wolverine. Yukio trained Amiko in the martial arts and to her own surprise she enjoyed her new role as a mother. When Sabretooth targeted Wolverine's friends and family, he hired Omega Red and Lady Deathstrike to kidnap Amiko. Yukio fought the two, but was overpowered and seriously injured, and left her in a wheelchair. She asked Wolverine to kill her, but Wolverine refused and saved Amiko shortly afterwards. Yukio reappeared and was fully recovered from her previous injuries. She teamed up with Storm again to enter the Arena, a fight club for mutants. In the end, Yukio, Storm, and Callisto took over the Arena.

Later, Yukio and Amiko were attacked by Hellverine. Her confusion over the fake Wolverine's behavior earned Yukio serious injuries, but Amiko returned from school just in time to save them both from Hellverine. When Wolverine goes back to Japan to stop a war between the Hand and the Yakuza, Yukio is shown to be once again in a wheelchair due to Hellverine's attack.

As part of the All-New, All-Different Marvel event, Yukio is shown running an illegal nightclub in Osaka, Japan when it is visited by War Machine where he asks her about the tech-based ninjas. Yukio states that she cannot say anything if she wants her business to stay afloat. After being threatened with the prospect of having the Avengers storming the place, Yukio points War Machine to a large man in a tuxedo, who leaves the nightclub with two women.

== Characteristics and abilities ==
Yukio is an occasional thief by profession, as well as a rōnin, a masterless samurai. Yukio has been portrayed as a free spirit with an almost careless disregard for personal safety. According to her own philosophy of life, living in danger is the ultimate adventure, while the peace of death is the final prize that awaits for every person who has truly lived. In 2011, UGO Networks featured her on their list of 25 Hot Ninja Girls, commenting: "While her short, black haircut and skin-tight leather outfit make her come off as a nefarious addition to the X-Men world, Yukio has proven to be quite a helpful non-mutant to Wolverine and his friends."

While Yukio is highly skilled in the martial arts, her specialty weapons are scalpel-like shuriken, of which she can hurl up to three at a time with deadly accuracy.

== Other versions ==
- In the limited series X-Men: The End, a Skrull masquerades as Yukio on a mission from the Shi'ar to eliminate Storm and Wolverine. It is killed by Storm's ice powers.
- A separate character from the original comic Yukio, Yuki "Yukio" ("Yuki O.") Ohara, based on the Yukio from Deadpool 2, first appeared in Marvel's Voices Infinity Comic #44 (Negasonic Teenage Warhead #1), in which she tries to prevent the end of the world by sharing a kiss with Negasonic Teenage Warhead.

== In other media ==
=== Television ===
Yukio appears in Marvel Anime: Wolverine, voiced by Romi Park in the Japanese version and by Kate Higgins in the English dub. This version wields retractable, circular throwing blades. After rescuing Wolverine from Yakuza thugs working for Shingen Yashida, she assists the former in his quest to rescue Mariko Yashida as part of her quest to seek revenge against Shingen for killing her parents. Yukio is later killed in battle by Shingen.

=== Film ===
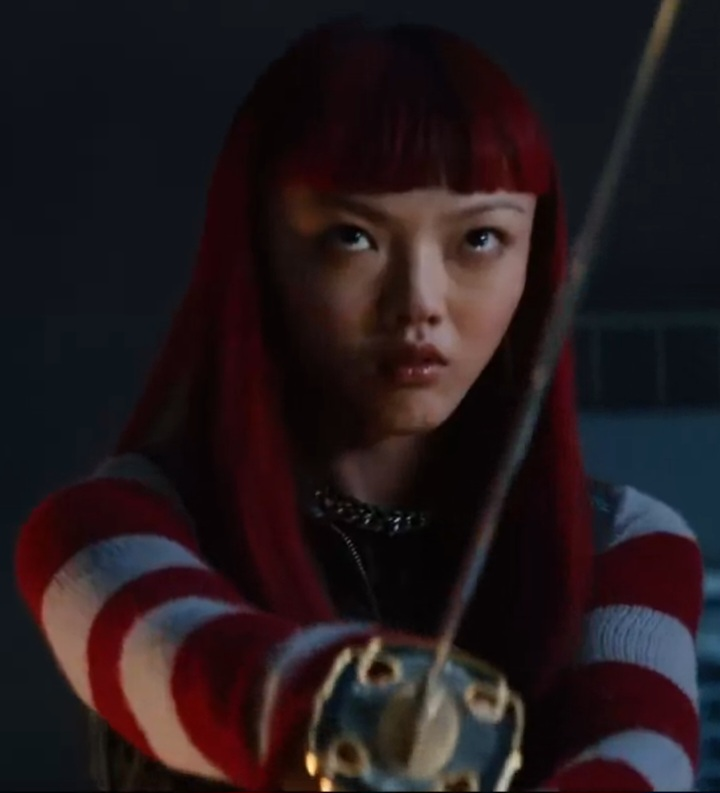
Yukio as portrayed by Rila Fukushima in The Wolverine

Yukio as portrayed by Shioli Kutsuna in Deadpool 2

- Yukio appears in The Wolverine, portrayed by Rila Fukushima. This version is a mutant with the ability to foresee others' deaths and was adopted by the Yashida family as a child to serve as a companion to Mariko Yashida. In the present, Yukio assists Logan in rescuing Mariko from Viper and Ichirō Yashida. Fukushima said of the role, "My character's very physical. Yukio and Wolverine have a lot in common. She really takes care of him and he also cares about her." Director James Mangold described Yukio as a lethal fighter who is "both sexy and almost kind of sprung from the anime world."
- An unrelated superhero also given the first name "Yukio" in reference to the comic-book character appears in Deadpool 2, portrayed by Shioli Kutsuna. This character is a member of the X-Men and the girlfriend of teammate Negasonic Teenage Warhead with technical prowess and electrokinesis. The character returned in Deadpool & Wolverine, portrayed again by Kutsuna.

=== Video games ===
Yukio appears in Marvel Heroes.

== Reception ==
In 2011, UGO Networks featured her on their list of 25 Hot Ninja Girls, commenting: "While her short, black haircut and skin-tight leather outfit make her come off as a nefarious addition to the X-Men world, Yukio has proven to be quite a helpful non-mutant to Wolverine and his friends."

Christy Lemire, writing for the website of Roger Ebert, described Yukio in The Wolverine as "frisky and fearless" and a "manga-inspired dream girl", writing that actress Fukushima "more than holds her own opposite the veteran Jackman in both the elaborate fight scenes and the quieter moments". With respect to her appearance in Deadpool 2, Sergio Pereira, writing for Screen Rant, felt that Kutsuna's portrayal of Yukio was bad for the character and the franchise, stating that "[a]ll of the character development and progress from The Wolverine is washed away as Yukio becomes a parody of herself". Writing for Bustle, Olivia Truffaut-Wong said that the Deadpool 2 Yukio "doesn't really seem to have a life outside of being one half of the first gay superhero couple onscreen... nor does she have a personality that goes beyond typical depictions of a cute Japanese anime character", although she does note the significance of the character appearing as being in a relationship.
