= Denis Akiyama =

Canadian actor (1952–2018)

- Born: Denis Van Akiyama; May 28, 1952; Toronto, Ontario, Canada
- Died: June 28, 2018 (aged 66); Toronto, Ontario, Canada
- Education: George Brown College
- Occupation: Actor
- Years active: 1987–2018
- Spouse: Danielle O'Connor (m. 1987)
- Children: 2

Denis Van Akiyama (May 28, 1952 – June 28, 2018) was a Canadian actor. He is known for portraying Shinji in Johnny Mnemonic, and for voicing Silver Samurai / Kenuichio Harada and Sunfire on X-Men: The Animated Series, and Malachite on the original English version of Sailor Moon.

== Early life and education ==
A third-generation Japanese Canadian (sansei), Akiyama was born in Toronto in 1952 to Namiko (née Yamada) and Kaye Akiyama. He attained a BA in Psychology from York University, and worked in child care. Akiyama was also a musician who played trumpet with the bands The Parachute Club and Pukka Orchestra. Akiyama went on to study acting at George Brown College.

== Career ==
=== Film ===
Akiyama started in film, before performing on stage. He was well-known for his role as the supporting villain Shinji in the cult cyberpunk film Johnny Mnemonic (1995). He also appeared in films like David Cronenberg's Dead Ringers (1989), Space Truckers (1996), Cypher (2002), The Pacifier (2005), Flash of Genius (2008), Repo Men (2010), and Resident Evil: Afterlife (also 2010). In 2015, he appeared as Pac-Man creator Tōru Iwatani in Pixels.

=== Television ===
Akiyama had a regular role on Katts and Dog as Officer Ron Nakemura and as Mr. Lee on She's the Mayor. He guest starred on numerous series, including Street Legal, War of the Worlds, ReGenesis, Degrassi: The Next Generation, Mayday, and Warehouse 13.

=== Theatre ===
In the early 1990s, Akiyama's stage performances included Miss Saigon on Broadway and in Toronto at the Princess of Wales Theatre. Other theatre appearances include Philip Kan Gotanda's Song for a Nisei Fisherman, Sally Han's Naomi's Road, M. J. Kang's Dreams of Blonde & Blue, and Hiro Kanagawa's The Tiger of Malaya.

=== Voice acting ===
Akiyama was a voice actor on numerous animated television series and video games, including The Adventures of Tintin. On X-Men: The Animated Series, he was the voice of Dr. Darrel Tanaka, Silver Samurai, and Sunfire. He voiced the villain Malachite in the original English version of the Japanese anime Sailor Moon.

He voiced Tong Si Hung in the Square Enix video game Deus Ex: Human Revolution.

== Personal life ==
Akiyama married Danielle O'Connor in 1987. The couple had two children, actor Kintaro Akiyama and Miya.

== Death ==
Akiyama died in Toronto on June 28, 2018, from a "very rare and aggressive cancer". He was 66 years old.

== Filmography ==
=== Live-action ===
==== Film ====
- 1988: Blood Relations – Heart Surgeon
- 1986: Captive Hearts – Masato
- 1988: Dead Ringers – Denis
- 1993: Guilty as Sin – Lab Technician
- 1995: Johnny Mnemonic – Shinji
- 1996: Balance of Power – Hastishita
- 1996: Extreme Measures – Prof. Asakura
- 1996: Lethal Tender – Det. Peter "Playdo" Ota
- 1996: L5: First City in Space (short) – Yoshio Mori
- 1996: Space Truckers – Tech Leader
- 1997: The Planet of Junior Brown – Mr. Tanaka
- 2000: After Alice – Owen Gackstetter
- 2002: Cypher – Speaker Omaha
- 2004: My Baby's Daddy – as Cha Ching
- 2004: Welcome to Mooseport – Izuki Nami
- 2005: The Pacifier – Mr. Chun
- 2007: Night (short) as Hikaru
- 2008: Flash of Genius – Dr. Ito
- 2008: Chilly Beach: The Canadian President – as Emperor (voice)
- 2010: Repo Men – Doctor
- 2010: Gangster Exchange – Takayama
- 2010: Resident Evil: Afterlife – Captain Hotaka
- 2015: Pixels – Professor Iwatani
- 2016: The People Garden – Management 529
- 2017: Kiss and Cry – Shin Amano
- 2017: Kill Order – Shiro Fujitaka (final film role)

==== Television ====
Denis Akiyama live action television credits
| Year | Title | Role | Notes | Ref. |
|---|---|---|---|---|
| 1985 | For the Record | Michael Nakashima | 1 episode | |
| 1986 | Check It Out | Unknown | Ito | |
| 1987 | Seeing Things | Unknown | 1 episode | |
| 1987 | Diamonds | Unknown | 1 episode | |
| 1988 | Friday the 13th: The Series | Hai Kwan | Episode: "Tattoo" | |
| 1988–92 | Katts and Dog | Officer Ron Nakemura | 49 episodes | |
| 1988, 1989 | Street Legal | Jonathan Imatsu / Satien Loc | 2 episodes | |
| 1989, 1990 | T. and T. | Ikuta / Mori | 2 episodes | |
| 1990 | War of the Worlds | Chin | 1 episode | |
| 1991 | Counterstrike | Lok | Episode: "Night of the Black Moon" (S2.E10) | |
| 1990 | Inside Stories | Aaron Iwata | Episode: "Heartbreak Hoteru" | |
| 1992 | In the Eyes of a Stranger | | TV movie | |
| 1992 | Top Cops | Wen Da Yee | 1 episode | |
| 1993 | Ghost Mom | Yamato | TV movie | |
| 1994, 1996 | Kung Fu: The Legend Continues | Lai Tzu / Lai (voice) | 2 episodes | |
| 1995 | Visitors of the Night | Stranger #2 | TV movie | |
| 1996 | Buried Secrets | Doctor #1 | TV movie | |
| 1996, 1997 | F/X: The Series | Dr. Miller / Lambert Chang | 2 episodes | |
| 1997 | Traders | Unknown | 1 episode | |
| 1999 | Killing Moon | Dr. Yamada | TV movie | |
| 2000 | Code Name Phoenix | Dr. Fong | TV movie | |
| 2000 | Relic Hunter | Colonel Chang | | |
| 2000 | The Last Debate | TV Makeup Artist | TV movie | |
| 2001 | The Judge | Peter Jacoby | Episode: "Part One" | |
| 2002 | Haven't We Met Before? | | TV movie | |
| 2002 | Odyssey 5 | Akegi | | |
| 2002 | The Brady Bunch in the White House | Hopeful Man | TV movie | |
| 2003 | Eloise at the Plaza | Prince of Kushin | TV movie | |
| 2004 | The Cradle Will Fall | Dr. Fachita | TV movie | |
| 2004 | H2O | Kazio Izumi | TV miniseries | |
| 2004 | Doc | Jian Wa | | |
| 2004 | Kevin Hill | Judge Porter | | |
| 2005 | Cool Money | District Attorney | TV movie | |
| 2005–12 | Mayday | Various roles | 3 episodes | |
| 2006 | ReGenesis | Crown Attorney | 1 episode | |
| 2006 | A Christmas Wedding | Asian Pacific President | TV movie | |
| 2008 | Degrassi: The Next Generation | Oncologist | Episode: "Death or Glory: Part 2" | |
| 2008 | The Summit | Prime Minister of Japan | TV miniseries | |
| 2008 | Roxy Hunter and the Myth of the Mermaid | Kyoto | TV movie | |
| 2009 | Wild Roses | Fukuwawa Sr. | | |
| 2009 | Warehouse 13 | Officer Ogawa | | |
| 2010 | Being Erica | Dr. Kotara | 1 episode | |
| 2010–12 | Wingin' It | Mr. Nakamura | 3 episodes | |
| 2011 | She's the Mayor | Mr. Lee | 13 episodes | |
| 2015 | 12 Monkeys | Nakano | 1 episode | |
| 2015 | Suits | Mr. Tanaka | 1 episode | |
| 2018 | Taken | Sensei | Episode: "Strelochnik" | |
| 2018 | Carter | Koji Yasuda | 6 episodes (2 posthumously) | |

=== Voice roles ===
==== Animation ====
Denis Akiyama animation voice credits
| Year | Title | Voice role | Notes | Ref. |
|---|---|---|---|---|
| 1991 | Rupert | Additional voices | | |
| 1991–92 | The Adventures of Tintin | Mitsuhirato / Bunji Kuraki / Tharkey | 3 episodes | |
| 1993–97 | X-Men | Dr. Darrel Tanaka / Silver Samurai / Sunfire | 4 episodes | |
| 1993–97 | The Busy World of Richard Scarry | Unknown | 36 episodes | |
| 1994 | Monster Force | Additional voices | 13 episodes | |
| 1994–95 | Wild C.A.T.s | Dockwell | 14 episodes | |
| 1995 | Sailor Moon | Malachite | 17 episodes | |
| 1995–2001 | Little Bear | Unknown | 27 episodes | |
| 1997, 1998 | Diabolik | Director Graffum | Episode: "Panther Uncaged" | |
| 1998 | Silver Surfer | Watcher Prime | 3 episodes | |
| 1998, 1999 | Mythic Warriors: Guardians of the Legend | Amycus / Cyclops | 2 episodes | |
| 1999 | Medabots | Mr. Referee | 52 episodes. English version | |
| 1999 | Power Stone | Galuda / Referee | 7 episodes. English version | |
| 1999 | Avengers: United They Stand | Dr. Chris Johnson | Episode: "Kang" | |
| 1999 | Ned's Newt | Guard / Elf | Episode: "Summer Gone, Summer Not / Sealed with a Newt" | |
| 2001 | Braceface | Mr. Ling | Episode: "Take That" | |
| 2003–05 | King | Unknown | 42 episodes | |
| 2004 | Franny's Feet | Sally | Episode: "The Lonely Library" | |
| 2005 | Time Warp Trio | Ieyasu / Honda | 1 episode | |
| 2005–08 | Delilah and Julius | Unknown | 31 episodes | |
| 2005–09 | Mr. Meaty | Unknown | 8 episodes | |
| 2008 | Toot & Puddle | Dr. Ha Song | 5 episodes | |
| 2008 | Chilly Beach: The Canadian President | Emperor | TV special | |
| 2009 | Super Why! | Additional voices | 1 episode | |
| 2011–13 | Scaredy Squirrel | Additional voices | 13 episodes | |
| 2011 | Justin Time | Emperor | Episode: "Secret Surprise & a Mammoth Mistake" | |
| 2017 | Inspector Gadget | Hattori-san | Episode: "Tempest in a Tea Cup / Mr. Security" | |

==== Video games ====
Denis Akiyama video game voice credits
| Year | Title | Voice role | Notes | Ref. |
|---|---|---|---|---|
| 2001 | Onimusha: Warlords | Nobunaga Oda, Narrator | English dub | |
| 2006 | Rainbow Six: Vegas | Kan Akahashi | | |
| 2008 | Rainbow Six: Vegas 2 | Kan Akahashi | | |
| 2011 | Deus Ex: Human Revolution | Tong Si Hung | Credited as 'Dennis Akiyama' | |
