= Ken Yamamura =

Japanese actor

- Born: Kennosuke Yamamura; January 21, 1986 (age 40); Osaka, Japan
- Occupation: Actor
- Years active: 2013–present

Ken Yamamura, born Kennosuke Yamamura (山村 憲之介, Yamamura Kennosuke; born January 21, 1986), is a Japanese actor best known for playing the younger Ichirō Yashida / Silver Samurai (sharing the main antagonist's role with Haruhiko Yamanouchi) in the 2013 film The Wolverine, and Takashi in the 2014 remake of Godzilla.

== Early life ==
Yamamura was born in Osaka on January 21, 1986. He studied drama at Flinders University in Adelaide, South Australia.

== Career ==
In 2013, Yamamura made his first acting appearance as the younger Ichiro Yashida / Silver Samurai in the American superhero film The Wolverine, which had starred Hugh Jackman. The following year, he went on to portray the role of Takashi, the associate of Bryan Cranston's character, in the 2014 reboot of Godzilla.

In 2019, he then appeared to portray as the character Oguchi in the thriller crime drama film Earthquake Bird, featuring Alicia Vikander and Riley Keough, which was released by Netflix on November 15, 2019.

In 2021, Yamamura has portrayed Taka in the film People Just Do Nothing: Big in Japan.

== Filmography ==
=== Film ===
Year	Title	Role	Notes
2013	Double Happiness Uranium	Mitch	
2013	The Wolverine	Young Ichirō Yashida / Silver Samurai	
2014	Godzilla	Takashi	
2017	Sekigahara	Shima Nobukatsu	
2019	Earthquake Bird	Detective Oguchi	
2021	People Just Do Nothing: Big in Japan	Taka	
2023	Tetris	Minoru Arakawa	
2023	Bad Lands		
2023	Gitling	Makoto	First Philippine movie lead role
2024	Crosspoint		
2026	Yakushima's Illusion	Dr. Mizuno	

=== Television ===
Year	Title	Role	Notes
2016	Black Mirror	Shou	Episode: "Playtest"
2022	Tokyo Vice	Reporter	Episode: "The Test"

- Massan (TV series) (2014) – Jiro Fujioka
- Kaze no Tôge: Ginkan no Fu (TV series) (2015)
- The Hybrid: Nue no ko (2015) – Kyogoku
