= Shingen Yashida =

Marvel Comics character

Lord Shingen Yashida

Publication information
- Publisher: Marvel Comics
- First appearance: Wolverine #1 (Sept. 1982)
- Created by: Chris Claremont; Frank Miller

In-story information
- Alter ego: Shingen Yashida
- Team affiliations: Yashida Clan; Kuzuryū, Brotherhood of Mutants; the Hand; Advanced Idea Mechanics; yakuza
- Notable aliases: Lord Shingen; Silver Samurai
- Abilities: Highly intelligent and resourceful Peak human physical condition despite his advanced age Master swordsman Experienced martial artist and hand-to-hand combatant Access to drugs, poisons, and weapons Business and political experience Vast criminal underworld connections Expert in intimidation and coercion Charisma and manipulation skills Expert in physical and psychological warfare

Lord Shingen Yashida (also Shingen Harada) is a supervillain appearing in American comic books published by Marvel Comics. The character is usually depicted as an adversary of Wolverine.

The character was played by Hiroyuki Sanada in the 2013 film The Wolverine.

== Publication history ==
Shingen first appeared in Wolverine #1 (Sept. 1982) and was created by Chris Claremont and Frank Miller.

== Fictional character biography ==
Shingen was a ruthless, combat-hungry, and megalomaniacal crime lord who used his yakuza connections to become the leader of the Yashida clan, ruling over the syndicate with an iron fist. To settle a personal debt incurred during his rise to power, Shingen forced his daughter Mariko Yashida to marry yakuza boss Noboru Hideki against her will. Wolverine found out Noboru beat Mariko nearly to death and confronted Noboru but relented from killing him upon Mariko's insistence.

Shingen was briefly resurrected by Phaedra of the Hand as part of a campaign of revenge against Wolverine.

== Powers and abilities ==
Lord Shingen had no superhuman abilities but was in peak physical condition despite his age, and he was one of the finest swordsmen and martial artists in all of Japan. Highly intelligent, he had extensive knowledge of human anatomy, pressure points, and great knowledge of poisons and assassination techniques. Shingen was highly skilled in the management of criminal organizations and very well connected in the international criminal underworld, particularly in areas of drug traffic.

== Other versions ==
In the comic series Exiles, a younger version of Shingen Yashida exists in the home reality of Mariko Yashida (aka Sunfire).

== In other media ==
=== Television ===
Shingen Yashida appears in Marvel Anime: Wolverine, voiced by Hidekatsu Shibata in the Japanese version and by Fred Tatasciore in the English dub. This version is the leader of the Kuzuryū syndicate (a yakuza faction) and a notorious member of A.I.M., serving as their weapons dealer. He arranges for his own daughter Mariko Yashida to be married against her will to Hideki Kurohagi of Madripoor, with the series focusing on Wolverine working to prevent the marriage and rescuing Mariko. He is also enemies with the Madripoor rebel leader Koh, who killed his son after he fell in love and started a family with one of Shingen's top assassins, whom he also killed when she turned on him. When Koh resurfaced years later to get his revenge on Shingen and Hideki, Shingen sadistically mocked his obsession with revenge and fatally wounded both him and his granddaughter Yukio. By the end of the series, in a last-ditch attempt to stop Wolverine and consolidate his power, Shingen banishes Hideki, Mariko, and his own henchmen and dons a special armor made of Vibranium and steel to battle Wolverine, during which he is killed.

=== Film ===
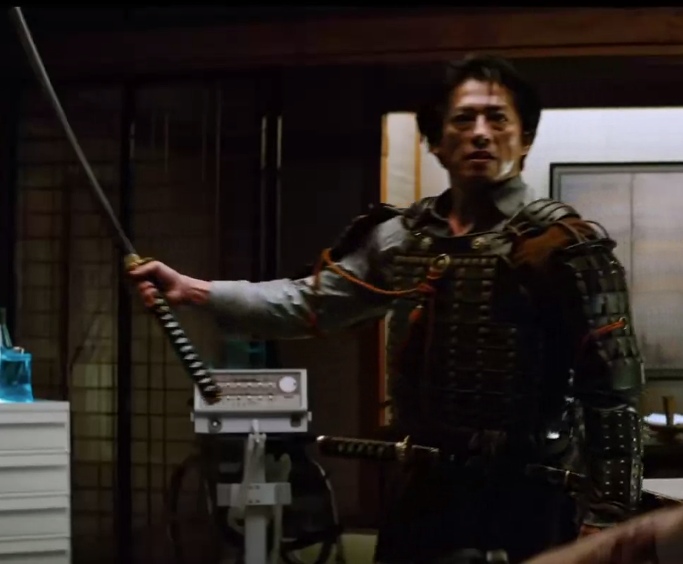
Shingen Yashida (portrayed by Hiroyuki Sanada) in The Wolverine.

Shingen Yashida appears in The Wolverine, portrayed by Hiroyuki Sanada. In addition to being the father of Mariko Yashida, this version is the son of billionaire Ichirō Yashida and foster brother of Yukio. After the Yashidas' technology empire is left to Mariko despite Shingen's attempts to cover up his father's near-bankruptcy, Shingen began seeking vengeance, developing an obsession with humiliating and killing Ichirō, and ruthlessly betrays his family by conspiring with Japan's Minister of Justice Noburo Mori and the yakuza to kill Mariko for taking what he saw as his and gain his father's admiration. After he is poisoned by Viper, Shingen dons the Yashida Clan's traditional samurai armor and attacks and attempts to brutally kill Yukio, but is instead defeated and killed by Logan.
