= Mariko Yashida =

Marvel Comics character

- Mariko Yashida in The Uncanny X-Men #173. Art by Paul Smith.

Publication information
- Publisher: Marvel Comics
- First appearance: The Uncanny X-Men #118 (Feb. 1979)
- Created by: Chris Claremont (writer); John Byrne (artist)

In-story information
- Species: Human
- Team affiliations: Yashida clan Hand
- Partnerships: Wolverine (lover/girlfriend)
- Notable aliases: Scarlet Samurai
- Abilities: Leadership skills Swordsmanship

Mariko Yashida is a fictional character appearing in American comic books published by Marvel Comics. The character has been depicted as Wolverine's romantic interest. Wolverine was forced to kill Mariko in an act of mercy after she was poisoned by a rival. Long after her death, Mariko was resurrected by the Hand as Scarlet Samurai.

Tao Okamoto portrays Mariko in the 2013 film The Wolverine.

== Publication history ==
Created by Chris Claremont and John Byrne, the character first appeared in Uncanny X-Men #118 (February 1979). In an interview published in Back Issue! magazine #4, Byrne claimed that Mariko was based on Lady Toda Mariko, a character in the 1975 novel Shōgun: "I had just read Shogun, which Chris had not read at that point. I just absolutely wanted to steal that character, just shamelessly steal the character. And as you probably know, she was created to die."

== Fictional character biography ==
Mariko Yashida is the daughter of Shingen Yashida, the half-sister of Kenuichio Harada, and cousin of Sunfire and Sunpyre and the aunt of Shingen Harada.

Mariko first encounters the X-Men when they return from a sojourn in the Savage Land and are asked to help stop the terrorist Moses Magnum in Japan. She encounters Wolverine in a private moment, which develops into a mutual attraction.

Some time later, Mariko is married by Shingen to yakuza gang leader Noburu-Hideki to solidify her father's connections to the Japanese underworld, and is subjected to domestic abuse by her husband. After realizing her father's intentions, Mariko plans to kill him and then commit seppuku in recompense. Logan, learning the truth about this manipulation and inspired by a personal epiphany about humanity, kills Shingen himself. Upon her father's death, Mariko becomes head (Oyabun) of the yakuza crime family Clan Yashida.

Mariko becomes engaged to Wolverine, but their wedding is halted by the supervillain Mastermind, who uses a mind control device to change Mariko's mind. When the control is lifted, Wolverine and Mariko resume their relationship after a period of separation, but do not reconsider marriage.

Mariko is poisoned with tetrodotoxin by the assassin Reiko in the employ of her rival Matsu'o Tsurayaba. She asks Wolverine to kill her to avoid a painful death and preserve her honor. Wolverine kills Mariko and vows to avenge her by severing parts of Tsurayaba's body every year on the anniversary of her death.

Old Man Logan, an alternate universe version of Wolverine, faces off against the Hand during their Regenix operation and battles their latest member, the Scarlet Samurai. Logan later discovers that Scarlet Samurai is Mariko, who has been resurrected by the Hand to serve as their weapon. With help from his past self, Logan frees Mariko from the Hand's control.

== Powers and abilities ==
Mariko is a skilled businesswoman.

As Scarlet Samurai, Mariko uses swords.

== Other versions ==
=== Age of Apocalypse ===
An alternate universe version of Mariko Yashida appears in Age of Apocalypse. This version is a former lover of Wolverine and a member of the Human High Council, a group of humans who oppose Apocalypse's rule.

=== Demon Days ===
An alternate universe version of Mariko Yashida appears as the protagonist of the miniseries Demon Days and its sequel, Demon Wars. This version is the daughter of an oni and the sister of Ogin, a composite character with elements of Silver Samurai and Ogun, who seeks revenge on her for mysterious reasons.

=== Exiles ===
The death of Sunfire. Art by Clayton Henry.

An alternate universe version of Mariko Yashida from Earth-2109 appears in the series Exiles. This version is a member of the X-Men and the eponymous Exiles who possesses similar powers to her relatives Sunfire and Sunpyre and uses the codename of the former. Additionally, Mariko is openly homosexual and was in a relationship with one reality's version of Spider-Woman (Mary Jane Watson). Mariko is later killed in battle after sacrificing herself to save a group of civilians from Mimic's attack.

==== Reception ====
Sunfire's open homosexuality has attracted some interest after coming out in Exiles #11. Her death has also garnered some attention. Perry Moore includes her as an example of the poor treatment of gay superheroes, paralleling the earlier trope of women in refrigerators.

Judd Winick states he has been accused of pursuing a broader social agenda, despite only writing a few stories with socially-relevant themes, as he explains in an interview with Comic Book Resources:

I've done a smattering of stories that are socially relevant and I'm considered the soap-box guy. I've done one story arc in Green Lantern featuring a gay character who was a survivor of a hate crime. Sunfire was gay in Exiles. And there's other stuff sort of there that people like to hang their hat on, saying I'm just this big commie out there pushing an agenda. It's only a handful of stories.

=== What If? ===
In the What If story "If Wolverine Had Married Mariko", Wolverine and Mariko's marriage is not hindered by Mastermind, and Wolverine abandons the X-Men to take control of Clan Yashida. This prompts the Silver Samurai to join with a yakuza faction and initiate war, ending in Mariko being killed. Blaming himself for her death, Wolverine rejoins the X-Men with a renewed determination.

=== Wolverine Noir ===
An alternate universe version of Mariko Yashida appears in Wolverine Noir. This version is a businesswoman who immigrated to the United States to expand her father's business.

=== Wolverine MAX ===
An alternate universe version of Mariko Yashida appears in Wolverine MAX. This version is a member of the Yashida clan during the early 1900s who broke up with Logan after he killed her father.

== In other media ==
=== Television ===
- Mariko Yashida appears in Wolverine and the X-Men, voiced by Gwendoline Yeo. This version is married to Kenuichio Harada.
- Mariko Yashida appears in Marvel Anime: Wolverine, voiced by Fumiko Orikasa in the original Japanese version and again by Gwendoline Yeo in the English dub. This version is arranged by Shingen Yashida to be married to Madripoor's current leader Hideki Kurohagi. Wolverine attempts to rescue Mariko, only for her to be accidentally shot and killed by Kurohagi.

=== Film ===
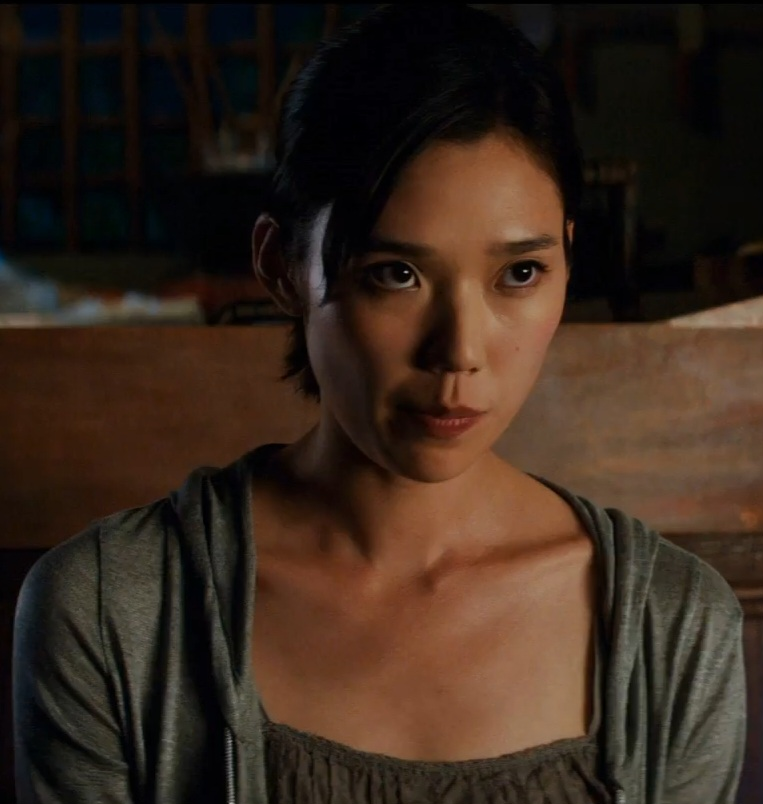
Tao Okamoto as Mariko from The Wolverine

Mariko Yashida appears in The Wolverine, portrayed by Tao Okamoto. This version is Ichirō Yashida's granddaughter, Shingen Yashida's daughter, Yukio's foster sister and Logan's love interest. At her grandfather's funeral, she is kidnapped by the yakuza crime syndicate but saved by Logan. As they hide in Yashida's house, they start to fall for each other. Mariko is kidnapped and taken to Yashida Corporation's headquarters, where it is revealed that her father ordered the yakuza to kidnap and ultimately assassinate her because Ichirō had left the family empire to her instead of Shingen. After escaping, Mariko becomes the Yashida Corporation's CEO and says goodbye to Logan, hoping to see him again.

=== Miscellaneous ===
Mariko Yashida is a supporting character in the 2023 X-Men Resistance version of Zombicide.
