= 2004 in comics =

Notable events of 2004 in comics.

== Events ==
- The Canadian publisher Arcana Studio is founded.

=== February ===
- February 6: Marvel Enterprises and Electronic Arts announce a multi-year agreement in which EA will develop a new generation of fighting video games, pitting Marvel superheroes against a new, original set of EA heroes.
- February 14: In an episode of Cathy, Irving proposes to the titular character.
- February 20: Erik Larsen becomes the new publisher of Image Comics, replacing Jim Valentino, who stepped down.

=== March ===
- March 10: After 27 years of continuous publication Dave Sim's Cerebus the Aardvark ends 300-issue run.

=== April ===
- April 21: Top Cow Productions launches its new property, Proximity Effect, with the first of two free online issues (at Best Indoor Signs Houston, TX | Interior Signs Retail, ADA, & More); the second issue was to premiere on May 26. A 96-page trade paperback collecting the series, with additional anthology stories and a new cover by Marc Silvestri, would be released June 30.
- April 21: In Groningen, the Netherlands, the Dutch Comics Museum (Nederlands Stripmuseum) opens its doors. It will exist until 2019.
- April 24: Nat Gertler and About Comics organize the first annual 24 Hour Comics Day, after a 1990 initiative by Scott McCloud. On this day, comics creators around the world are invited to spend the day making a 24-hour comic. Many comic book stores support this event by setting up space for participating artists to work on their comic. It attracts many writers and artists, working both in print and web media.
- April 26: Cartoonist Jim Scancarelli has the character Phyllis Wallet, wife of Walt, pass away in Gasoline Alley.
- April 30: Dutch comics artist and illustrator Joost Swarte is knighted in the Order of Orange-Nassau.

=== May ===
- May 9: Sam Linthout, son of Belgian cartoonist Willy Linthout, commits suicide at age 21. This will motivate Linthout to draw a graphic novel about his grief: Years of the Elephant.
- May 19: At the instigation of Kees Kousemaker, owner of the Amsterdam comics store Lambiek, the first buildings of the Stripheldenbuurt in the Dutch city Almere are inaugurated. This is a district where all street names are named after famous comics characters and cartoonists.

=== June ===
- With issue #1595, Comics Buyer's Guide changes its format from a weekly tabloid to a monthly squarebound magazine. In addition, in hopes of enhancing newsstand sales, CBG adds a price guide for contemporary comics as well as other new features intended to make the magazine more appealing to those with an avid interest in comic books as an investment.
- June 3: Marvel Comics announces the creation of its first prose imprint Marvel Press. Three novels were scheduled for 2004: the young adult novel Mary Jane II would land on bookstore shelves in June, followed by an adult fantasy Wolverine title in October and a middle grade Spider-Man title in November.
- June 18: CrossGen Entertainment files for Chapter 11 bankruptcy at the US Bankruptcy Court in Tampa, Florida. ("Copy of filing" (PDF). Archived from the original (PDF) on 2005-08-17. (220 KiB)
- Daniel Clowes' The Death-Ray is prepublished in Eightball.

=== August ===
- Jeroom creates his gag comic Joske Het Debiele Ei.
- August 26: Italian journalist and translator of Doonesbury in comics magazine Linus Enzo Baldoni is murdered by terrorists in Iraq.

=== September ===
- September 29: Mark Retera wins the Stripschapprijs. Normally he would be awarded the prize during the Stripdagen in Alphen aan de Rijn a month later, but since he planned a holiday then he is given it during a broadcast of the TV show Vara Laat.

=== October ===
- October 6: Marvel Enterprises announces an agreement with Antefilms Production to produce a new animated television series based on The Fantastic Four.
- 23-24 October: During the Stripdagen in Alphen aan de Rijn Jan Joosse of the organisation Biblion wins the P. Hans Frankfurther Prize. Nico van Dam, Bert Bus en Harry Balm receive the Bulletje en Boonestaakschaal.

=== November ===
- November 30: Artist Michael Ryan (New X-Men: Academy X, Mystique) signs an exclusive 3-year contract with Marvel Comics.

=== December ===
- December 1: Colorist Frankie D'Armata (Ultimate Nightmare, New Avengers, Captain America) signs an exclusive 3-year contract with Marvel Comics.
- December 2: Artist Michael Lark (Gotham Central) and colorist Morry Hollowell (Ultimate Secret, Marvel Knights 4, Meridian) sign exclusive contracts with Marvel Comics.
- December 3: Artist Mark Brooks (Amazing Fantasy, Marvel Age Spider-Man) signs a 3-year exclusive contract with Marvel Comics.

=== Specific date unknown ===
- French comic artist Jean Graton is honored as a Commandeur in the Ordre des Arts et des Lettres.
- Gary Panter releases the graphic novel Jimbo in Purgatory.

== Deaths ==
=== January ===
- January 7:
  - Daniel Billon, French comics artist (Les Animaux Célèbres, continued Barbarella), dies at age 76.
  - Jerzy Skarzynski, Polish theatre artist and comics artist (Janosik Sans Titre), dies at age 79.
- January 8: Eddy Ryssack, Belgian comics artist (Brammetje Bram, Opa), dies at age 75 from a heart attack.
- January 20: George Woodbridge, American comics artist (Mad Magazine), dies at age 73 from emphysema.
- January 23: Jules Coenen, Dutch comic artist (Disney comics), dies at age 44.
- January 25: Guus van Cleef, Dutch comics writer (Disney comics) and artist (De Diefstal van de Eve + Adam Kollektie), dies at age 54.
- January 31: Giorgio Cambiotti, Italian comics artist (Jacula, worked on Kriminal, Messalina and Reno Kid, continued Mandrake the Magician and The Phantom), dies at age 72.

=== February ===
- February 1:
  - Josep María Madorell, Spanish comics artist (Jep i Fidel, Pere Vidal, En Massagran), dies at age 80.
  - James Simpkins, Canadian animator and comics artist (Jasper the Bear), dies at age 93.
- February 3: Fiep Westendorp, Dutch illustrator and comics artist (Tante Patent), dies at age 87.
- February 8:
  - Julius Schwartz, American comic book writer and editor (DC Comics), dies at age 88.
  - Norman Thelwell, British comics artist (Chicko, Penelope), dies at age 80.
- February 16:
  - Tito Marchioro, Italian comics artist (Johnny Speed, Texas Bill, Sylver des Collines), dies at age 82.
  - Bill Oakley, American comics letterer (Marvel Comics, DC Comics) dies at age 39.
- February 24:
  - Rudy Lapick, American comics inker (Archie Comics), dies at age 77.
  - Jean-Marc Lelong, French comics artist (Carmen Cru, Monsieur Émile), dies at age 55.
- February 25: Albert Chartier, Canadian illustrator and comics artist (Bouboule, Onésime, Séraphin), dies at age 91.

=== March ===
- March 5: Martin Emond, New Zealand painter, illustrator and comics artist (Accident Man, The Punisher), commits suicide at age 33.
- March 8: Mario Uggeri, Italian painter, sculptor and comics artist, dies at age 70.
- March 11:
  - Ladislaus Elischer, German comics artist (Bummel, Mexycano, Die Spreenixen), dies at age 68 or 69.
  - Gilles Nicoulaud, French comics artist, dies at age 61.
- March 30: Doug Tainsh, Australian cartoonist, gag writer, screenwriter and comics artist (Speewah Jack, Cedric), dies at age 82.

=== April ===
- April 5: Gébé, French comics artist (L'An 01), dies from a tumor at age 74.
- April 8: Ernö Zórád, Hungarian comics artist, painter and illustrator, dies at age 93.
- April 10: Chester Commodore, American comics artist (The Sparks, continued Bungleton Green, The Ravings of Professor Doodle, So What?), dies at age 89.
- April 11: Irv Novick, American comics artist (DC Comics) artist, dies at age 93.
- April 14:
  - Harry Holt, American comics artist and animator (Blackeye and Blubber, worked for Merry Go-Round Comics), dies at age 93.
  - Pepe Huinca, Chilean comics artist (Artemio), dies at age 61 in a car accident.
- April 15: Mitsuteru Yokoyama, Japanese manga artist (Tetsujin 28-go, Giant Robo, Sangokushi), dies at age 69 in a home fire.

=== May ===
- May 1: Jørgen Mogensen, Danish comics artist (Alfredo, Poeten og Lillemor, Roselil og hendes mor), dies at age 82.
- May 5: Marco Rostagno, Italian comic artist (Sélène, Beatrice, Storia della Chiesa, Reporter Blues, 72 Ore), dies at age 68.
- May 11: Aristophane Boulon, aka Aristophane, French comics artist, dies at age 37.
- May 12: Syd Hoff, American cartoonist and comics artist (Tuffy, Laugh It Off), dies at age 91.
  - Jack Bradbury, American comics artist (Disney comics, Looney Tunes comics, Walter Lantz comics), dies at age 89.
  - Gill Fox, American comics artist (Side Glances, Wilbert, Bumper to Bumper, Jeanie, Joe Magarar, worked on Hi & Lois), dies at age 88.
- May 15: Robert Naylor, American animator and comics artist (assisted and continued Barney Baxter, Embarrassing Moments, Jerry on the Job, Big Sister), dies at age 94.
- May 16: Remus Dimitrie Sbiera, aka Sool Sbiera, Romanian comics artist (Les Braconniers), dies at age 67.
- May 20: Marc Moallic, French comic artist (Ludovic, Jonas et Casimir), dies at age 97.

=== June ===
- June 6: Kate Worley, American comics writer (Omaha the Cat Dancer), dies of cancer at age 46.
- June 7: Karel Biddeloo, Belgian comics artist (continued De Rode Ridder), dies from cancer at age 60.
- June 17: Todor Dinov, Bulgarian animator and comics artist (Malkoto Anche), dies at age 84.
- June 24: Heinz Rammelt, German comics artist (Der Insel der Ferianer, Chi-Chi), dies at age 92.

=== July ===
- July 2: John Cullen Murphy, American comics artist (Big Ben Bolt, worked on Prince Valiant), dies at age 85.
- July 8: Chlodwig Poth, German comics artist (Amadeus Knüll), dies at age 74.
- July 25: Joe Buresch, American comics artist (Dinah Mite), dies at age 87.
- July 26: Oğuz Aral, Turkish comics artist (Hafiyesi Mahmut, Hayk Mammer, Utanmaz Adam, Avanak Avni), dies at age 68.
- July 28: Eugenio Zoppi, Argentine comics artist (Alain y Crazy, Misterix), dies at age 81.
- Specific date in July unknown: Mario Capaldi, British comics artist and illustrator, dies at age 69.

=== August ===
- August 2: François Craenhals, Belgian comics artist (Pom et Teddy, Primus et Musette, Les 4 As, Le Chevalier Ardent), dies at age 77.
- August 11: George Breisacher, American comics artist (Knobs, continued Mutt and Jeff), dies at age 64.
- August 26: Enzo Baldoni, Italian journalist and translator of Doonesbury in the Italian magazine Linus, is kidnapped and murdered by terrorists in Iraq at age 55.
- August 30: Bart Huges, Dutch activist and comics writer (Arnold Slak & de Slow Sisters op weg, Licht uit de put, Een wetenschappelijke sekte...? en Gnōthi seauton/Ken uzelf: erken uw oude engrammen), dies at age 70.

=== September ===
- September 4: Bram Vermeulen, Dutch comedian, singer and comic artist (Gé Dubbelkluts, Gijs Goochem, Jan Lul en de Flauwe Cultuur), dies at age 57.
- September 5: Carlos Leopardi, Argentine comics artist (Atila, worked on Nippur de Lagash), dies at age 57.

=== October ===
- October 30: Claude Verrier, French illustrator and comics artist (Klic... Le Petit Lutin, Mouche, Rémi et Fasol), dies at age 85.

=== November ===
- November 2: Theo van Gogh, Dutch film director and comics writer (wrote comics in collaboration with Eric Schreurs), is murdered at age 47.
- November 5: Ed Moore, American comics artist (Bos'n Hall, Sea Scout, Tom Chase, Johnny Quick, Paul Kirk Manhunter, assisted on The Jackson Twins, Dan Dunn, Rufus, Don Winslow of the Navy), dies at age 86.
- November 6: Lars Hillersberg, Swedish caricaturist and comics artist, dies at age 67.
- November 7: Mariel Dauphin, French comic artist (made comic adaptations of literary works), dies at age 96.
- November 9: Hans Nordenström, A.K.A. Brul, Swedish architect, cartoonist, illustrator and comics artist, dies at age 77.
- November 12: Harry Hargreaves, British comics artist, illustrator and animator (Hayseeds, assisted on Pansy Potter and Panda, the bird in Punch), dies at age 82.
- November 13: Harry Lampert, American comics artist (co-creator of The Flash), dies at age 88.
- November 25: Bob Haney, American comics writer (DC Comics, co-creator of the Teen Titans), dies at c. age 78.
- November 29: Irwin Donenfeld, American comics executive (National Periodicals/DC Comics), dies at age 78.

=== December ===
- December 22: Loek van Delden, Dutch comics artist (Smidje Verholen, Brigadier Piet), dies at age 86.
- December 22: Ben van Voorn, Dutch comics artist and animator (worked for Marten Toonder), dies at age 67.
- December 26: Pierre Dupuis, French comics artist (Les Grands Capitaines, La Seconde Guerre Mondiale, worked on L'oncle Paul series, continued Mam'zelle Minouche), dies at age 75.

=== Specific date unknown ===
- Dimitris Antonopoulos, Greek architect, painter, illustrator and comics artist (Ta Koróida oi Archaíoi, aka The Ancient Losers), dies at age 71 or 72.
- Wim Hanssen, Dutch comic artist (comic adaptations of De Molenaar and 1984), dies at age 45.
- Lucien Meys, Belgian comics artist (Le Beau Pays d'Onironie, Chroniques de l'Heureux Zélu) and comics writer (Signor Spaghetti, Modeste et Pompon, Mongwy), dies at age 67 or 68.
- Mehmet Tunali, Turkish painter and comic artist (Alparslan, Amsterdam Underwater), dies at age 48 or 49.

== Exhibitions ==
- September 15–December 10: "Gillray's Legacy," curated by Lucy Shelton Caswell (part of 8th Festival of Cartoon Art) (Philip Sills Gallery, William Oxley Thompson Library, The Ohio State University, Columbus, Ohio)
- October 1, 2004–January 14, 2005: "Drawing Fire: Controversial Comics by Milton Caniff" (part of 8th Festival of Cartoon Art) (Ohio State University's Cartoon Research Library’s reading room gallery, Columbus, Ohio)

== Conventions ==
- January 10–11: Florida Extravaganza (Orange County Convention Center, Orlando, Florida)
- January 31: FLUKE Mini-Comics & Zine Festival (Tasty World, Athens, Georgia)
- February 21–22: Alternative Press Expo (Concourse Exhibition Center, San Francisco)
- February 29: Emerald City ComiCon (Qwest Field, West Field Plaza, Seattle, Washington) — guests: Stan Sakai, J.G. Jones, Howard Chaykin, Dave Johnson, Todd Nauck, Jeff Johnson, Tomm Coker, Stefano Gaudiano, Brian Michael Bendis, Phil Noto, Matt Wagner, Ford Gilmore, Bob Schreck, Kurt Busiek, Jay Faerber, Greg Rucka, Darick Robertson, John Layman, David Hahn, Karl Kesel, Paul Guinan, Matt Haley, Steve Lieber, Dan Norton, Jason Pearson, and Michael T. Gilbert
- February 29: Toronto ComiCON I (Metro Toronto Convention Centre, Toronto, Ontario, Canada)
- March 5–7: MegaCon (Orange County Convention Center, Orlando, Florida) — guests include Kaare Andrews, Brian Michael Bendis, John Cassaday, Amanda Conner, Phil Jimenez, Andy Lee, Tony Lorenz, David W. Mack, James O'Barr, Jimmy Palmiotti, Walter Simonson, Craig Thompson, Skottie Young, Luis Amado, Tony Bedard, Jose Caraballo, Patrick Carlucci, Jim Cheung, Laura DePuy, Chuck Dixon, Steve Epting, Glenda Finkelstein, Jeff Johnson, Greg Land, Ron Marz, Stanley Morrison, Mike Perkins, Brandon Peterson, Justin Ponsor, Ariel Rivero, Tone Rodriguez, Steven Sanchez, Bart Sears, Josh Sullivan, Kevin Smith, Jason Mewes, Allison Mack, Walter Koenig, Ken Foree, Brad Dourif, Noah Hathaway, Herbert Jefferson, Jr., Brian Thompson, Glenn Shadix, Marc Singer, Angela Cartwright, Bill Mumy, Virginia Hey, and Sid Haig
- March 6–7: London Film and Comic Con I (Wembley Exhibition Centre, London, England, UK) — inaugural event
- March 13–14: Chicago ComicFest (Ramada Plaza Hotel O'Hare, Rosemont, Illinois)
- March 20: UK Web & Mini Comix Thing (The Octagon, Queen Mary's College, Stepney, London, UK): the first iteration of this event, organized by Patrick Findlay. Guests included Al Davison, Roger Langridge, and Gary Spencer Millidge
- March 19–21: Wizard World Los Angeles (Long Beach Convention Center, Long Beach, California) — inaugural event; 19,000 attendees; guest of honor Kevin Smith; other guests include Eric Basaldua, Brian Michael Bendis, Alex Ross, Avi Arad, Selma Blair, Guillermo del Toro, James Franco, Gale Anne Hurd, Thomas Jane, Stan Lee, Kevin Nash, Ron Perlman, Rebecca Romijn-Stamos, and Marc Silvestri
- April: Phoenix Comicon (Glendale, Arizona)
- April 1–3: National Comic Book, Art, and Sci-Fi Expo I (Penn Plaza Pavilion, New York City) — guest of honor Jerry Robinson; other guests include Sergio Aragonés, Jim Lee, Mark Bagley, Bill Sienkiewicz, Roy Thomas, Alex Maleev, and Kevin Eastman
- April 3: Small Press and Alternative Comics Expo (S.P.A.C.E.) (Ohio Expo Center, Rhodes Center, Columbus, Ohio) — special guests: Dave Sim and Gerhard. Sim awarded the SPACE Lifetime Achievement Award
- April 16–18: Atlanta Comicon (Gwinnett Civic Center, Gwinnett, Georgia) — 2,000–6,000 attendees
- April 30–May 2: Pittsburgh Comicon (Radisson Hotel Pittsburgh ExpoMart, Monroeville, Pennsylvania) — guests include Jim Rugg, George A. Romero, Lani Tupu, and Virginia Hey
- May 2: Toronto ComiCON Fan Appreciation Event (Metro Toronto Convention Centre, Toronto, Ontario, Canada)
- May 1–2: WonderCon (Moscone Center, San Francisco, California)
- May 14–16: Motor City Comic Con I (Novi Expo Center, Novi, Michigan) — 15th anniversary show; guests include Julie Benz, Erin Gray, Kate Jackson, Ron Perlman, and Alfonso Ribeiro.
- May 15: East Coast Black Age of Comics Convention (Philadelphia, Pennsylvania) — presentation of the ECBACC Pioneer Lifetime Achievement Award
- May 21–23: Wizard World East (Philadelphia Convention Center, Philadelphia, Pennsylvania)
- May 23–24: Comic Festival (Ramada Plaza, Bristol, Avon, England, U.K.) — guests include Gary Spencer Millidge, Bob Finch, Norman Lovett, John McCrea, Duncan Fegredo, David Roach, Rob Williams, Jon Foster, and Gary Erskine
- June 5–6: Adventure Con 3 (Knoxville Expo Center, Knoxville, Tennessee) — 3,000 attendees
- June 5–13: Comica — London International Comics Festival (Institute of Contemporary Arts and the French Institute, London, UK) — guests include Chris Ware, Seth, Posy Simmonds, David Beauchard, Craig Thompson, Quentin Blake, Joann Sfar, Frank Margerin, José Villarrubia, Al Davison, ILYA, Glenn Dakin, Carol Swain, Woodrow Phoenix, Chris Reynolds, Sylvia Farago, Simone Lia, Neal Fox, Aleksandar Zograf, Dupuy and Berberian, Joann Sfar, Lewis Trondheim, Andrzel Klimowski, Benoît Peeters
- June 6: Stumptown Comics Fest (Portland, Oregon) — first inaugural event, hosted by the Old Church, a non-profit organization whose goal was to preserve an old church. 22 exhibitor tables, 150 attendees
- June 11–13: Heroes Convention (Charlotte Convention Center, Charlotte, North Carolina) — guests include Jim Amash, Murphy Anderson, John Beatty, Mark Brooks, Nick Cardy, Richard Case, John Cassaday, Dave Cockrum, Steve Conley, Kim DeMulder, Tommy Lee Edwards, Steve Epting, Matt Feazell, Tom Feister, Ron Garney, Chris Giarrusso, Keron Grant, Cully Hamner, Scott Hampton, Tony Harris, Irwin Hasen, Sam Henderson, Adam Hughes, Georges Jeanty, Dan Jolley, Nat Jones, Jim Krueger, Dick Kulpa, Jason Latour, Rick Leonardi, Joseph Michael Linsner, Aaron Lopresti, David W. Mack, Ed McGuinness, Joshua Middleton, Martin Nodell, Phil Noto, Michael Avon Oeming, Jeff Parker, Jason Pearson, Brandon Peterson, Paul Pope, Howard Porter, Eric Powell, George Pratt, James Pruett, Joe Pruett, Budd Root, Josef Rubinstein, Paul Ryan, David Self, Bill Sienkiewicz, Joe Sinnott, Joe Staton, Brian Stelfreeze, Karl Story, Roy Thomas, Tim Townsend, Robert Ullman, Dexter Vines, Neil Vokes, Loston Wallace, Mike Wieringo, and Larry Young
- June 18–20: Toronto Comic Con ("Paradise Comics Toronto Comicon") (National Trade Centre, Queen Elizabeth Building, Toronto, Ontario, Canada) — guests of honor: Will Eisner and Dave Sim; other guests: Bill Sienkiewicz, Greg Horn, Roy Thomas, Cary Nord, Steve McNiven, Jimmy Palmiotti, Amanda Conner, Cameron Stewart, Paul Ryan, Tom Grummett, Terry Austin, Mike Kaluta, Dale Keown, Dave Ross, J. Torres, Ty Templeton, Rob Van Dam
- June 26–27: MoCCA Festival (Puck Building, New York City)
- July 22–25: Comic-Con International (San Diego Convention Center, San Diego, California) — 95,000 attendees; official guests: Jack Adler, Roger Dean, Dave Gibbons, Tom Gill, Harry Harrison, Sid Jacobson, Geoff Johns, Batton Lash, Chuck McCann, Aaron McGruder, Brad Meltzer, Mike Mignola, Rebecca Moesta, Bill Plympton, Eduardo Risso, Jean Schulz, Frank Springer, Tim Thomerson, Craig Thompson, and John Totleben. Comic-Con expands into Hall H of the San Diego Convention Center and now occupies the entire exhibit space.
- August 8: National Comic Book, Art, and Sci-Fi Expo II (Penn Plaza Pavilion, New York City)
- August 13–15: Wizard World Chicago (Rosemont Convention Center, Rosemont, Illinois) — guest of honor: Joss Whedon; special guests: Kelly Hu and Amber Benson; other guests: Brian Michael Bendis, Josh Blaylock, J. Scott Campbell, John Cassaday, Jim Cheung, Marie Croall, Tony Daniel, Lou Ferrigno, Gene Ha, Greg Horn, Geoff Johns, Dan Jolley, Jim Lee, Jeph Loeb, Sean McKeever, Angel Medina, Mark Millar, Mike Norton, Joe Quesada, Alex Ross, Alex Saviuk, Marc Silvestri, Kevin Smith, Michael Turner, Brian K. Vaughn, and Skottie Young
- August 14–15: "CAPTION is History" (Wolfson College, Oxford, England) — guests include Al Davison and Pat Mills
- August 27–29: Fan Expo Canada (Metro Toronto Convention Centre, Toronto, Ontario, Canada) — 27,684 attendees; guests include George Takei, Julie Benz, Peter Mayhew, Mercedes McNab, Anthony Montgomery, Aron Eisenberg, Cirroc Lofton, George A. Romero, Tom Savini, Alejandro Jodorowsky, Doug Bradley, Yoshitoshi ABe, Yasuyuki Ueda, George Pérez, Brian Azzarello, Mike Deodato, Rags Morales, Skottie Young, Adam Hughes, David W. Mack, and Jill Thompson
- September 3–6: Dragon Con (Hyatt Regency Atlanta/Marriott Marquis, Atlanta, Georgia) — 20,000+ attendees
- September 18–19: National Comic Book, Art, and Sci-Fi Expo III (Penn Plaza Pavilion, New York City) — guests include Jim Steranko, Sal Buscema, Glen Fabry, Los Bros Hernandez, and Angel Medina
- September 23: Comics Salon (Pezinok, Slovakia)
- October 1–3: International Comics and Animation Festival (ICAF) / Small Press Expo (SPX) (Holiday Inn Select, Bethesda, Maryland) — guests include John Benson, Steve Brodner, Tobias Schalken & Stefan Van Dinther, Lily Lau Lee Lee, Miguelanxo Prado, Paul Karasik, R. Sikoryak, Frank Cammuso, Keith Knight, Ted Rall, Mikhaela Blake Reid, and Jen Sorensen
- October 15–16: Festival of Cartoon Art (Ohio State University, Columbus, Ohio) — "Deletions, Omissions and Erasures"; featured speakers Lalo Alcaraz, Tom Batiuk, Charles Brownstein, Al Feldstein, Nicole Hollander, Bob Levin, Jay Lynch, Cindy McCreery, Joel Pett, Michael Ramirez, Art Spiegelman, Ann Telnaes, Tom Tomorrow, and Michelle Urry
- October 16–17: Motor City Comic Con II (Novi Expo Center, Novi, Michigan)— guests include Dan Mishkin, Rowena Morrill, Bill Morrison, Stephanie Murnane, Eddy Newell, Diana Okamoto, Mike Okamoto, Mike Pascale, Scott Rosema, Steve Rude, Stan Sakai, Paul Sizer, Layne Toth, Daniel Webb, Bill Wilkinson, and Randy Zimmerman
- October 23: London Comic Festival (Holiday Inn London Bloomsbury, London, England, U.K.) — guests include Gary Spencer Millidge
- October 23–24: Dallas Comic Con (Plano Centre, Plano, Texas) — guests include Adam Hughes, Michael Lark, Greg Horn, Dan Brereton, Cal Slayton, and Michael Jantze
- November 5–7: Wizard World Texas (Arlington Convention Center, Dallas, Texas) — guests include Jim Lee, Brian Pulido, Marc Silvestri, Michael Turner, Mark Waid, and Skottie Young
- November 6–7: Comic Expo (Ramada City Inn, Bristol, United Kingdom) — first iteration of this annual convention; guests include Simon Furman, Mike Carey, and Mike Collins
- November 6–7: London Film and Comic Con II (Wembley Exhibition Centre, London, England, UK)
- November 27–28: Mid-Ohio Con (Columbus Hilton Easton, Columbus, Ohio) — guests include Sergio Aragonés, John Byrne, Talent Caldwell, Stan Goldberg, Marc Hempel, David Mack, Michael Avon Oeming, Jeff Smith, and Tom Batiuk

== First issues by title ==
=== DC Comics ===
JSA Strange Adventures
Release: October.

=== Marvel Comics ===
Guardians
Release: July 14. Writer: Marc Sumerak. Artist: Casey Jones.

Loki
Release: July 7. Writer: Robert Rodi. Artist: Esad Ribić.

Man-Thing
Release: July 21. Writer: Hans Rodionoff. Artist: Kyle Hotz.

Official Handbook of the Marvel Universe: Avengers 2004
Release: July 7. Cover by: Salvador Larroca.

Starjammers
Release: July 7.Writer: Kevin J. Anderson. Artist: Francisco Ruiz Velasco.

Witches
Release: June. Writer: Brian Walsh. Artist: Will Conrad.

=== Other publishers ===
Capitão Brasil

Osiedle Swoboda
Release: June by Niezależna Prasa. Writer & Artist: Michał Śledziński

== Initial appearances by character name ==
=== DC Comics ===
- Aquagirl (Lorena Marquez) in Aquaman #16 (May)
- Brick in Green Arrow #40 (September)
- Jason Rusch in Firestorm #1 (July)

=== Marvel Comics ===
- Armor in Astonishing X-Men #4 (October)
- Abigail Brand in Astonishing X-Men #6 (December)
- Anya Corazon in Amazing Fantasy #1 (August)
- Gorgon (Tomi Shishido) in Wolverine #20 (December)
- Indra in New X-Men: Academy X #7 (December)
- Daisy Johnson in Secret War #2 (July)
- Loa in New Mutants #11 (June)
- Aleksander Lukin in Captain America #1 (December)
- Ord in Astonishing X-Men #1 (May)
- Pagon in New Avengers #1 (December)
- Pixie in New X-Men: Academy X #5 (November)
- Kavita Rao in Astonishing X-Men #1 (July)
- Tildie Soames in Astonishing X-Men #1 (July)
- Spider-Man (Pavitr Prabhakar) in Spider-Man: India #1 (November)
- Toxin in Venom/Carnage #2 (October)
- Lorelei Travis in District X #1 (May)
- White Tiger (Angela del Toro) in Daredevil #58 (March)
- X-23 in NYX #3 (February)
- Zookeeper in Teen Titans #13 (September)
