= Fade from Grace =

Five-part comic series

- Fade from Grace; TBP Comic book Cover

Publication information
- Publisher: Beckett Comics
- Schedule: Monthly
- Format: Limited series
- Publication date: August 2004 - March 2005
- No. of issues: Five
- Main character(s): John; Grace

Creative team
- Created by: Jeff Amano
- Written by: Gabriel Benson
- Artist(s): Jeff Amano

Fade from Grace is a five-part limited series written by Gabriel Benson, and illustrated and created by Jeff Amano; it is published by Beckett Comics.

== Synopsis ==
John and Grace are an ordinary couple until John comes home one day to find his wife trapped inside their burning house. When John tries to save her, he discovers that he has superpowers. The mini-series focuses on the effects this has on their relationship, especially after John decides to take on the secret identity "Fade."

== Publication history ==
Beckett Comics published the original five series run from August 2004 to March 2005. The issues were later collected into a trade paperback in November 2005, and distributed by Image Comics.
