= Wolverine and the X-Men (TV series) =

American animated superhero television series

- Genre: Superhero
- Based on: X-Men by: Stan Lee; Jack Kirby
- Developed by: Craig Kyle; Greg Johnson
- Directed by: Nicholas Filippi; Steven E. Gordon; Doug Murphy; Boyd Kirkland
- Voices of: Steve Blum; Kieren van den Blink; Susan Dalian; Jennifer Hale; Danielle Judovits; Tom Kane; Yuri Lowenthal; Nolan North; Liam O'Brien; Roger Craig Smith; Fred Tatasciore; Kari Wahlgren; Jim Ward
- Narrated by: Steve Blum
- Theme music composer: Dean Grinsfelder
- Composer: Dean Grinsfelder
- Country of origin: United States
- Original language: English
- No. of seasons: 1
- No. of episodes: 26

Production
- Executive producers: Ed Borgerding; Kevin Feige; P. Jayakumar; Stan Lee; Eric S. Rollman
- Producer: Jason Netter
- Editors: Aeolan Kelly; George Rizkallah; Ralph A. Eusebio
- Running time: 23 minutes
- Production companies: Toonz Entertainment; First Serve International; Liberation Entertainment; EVA Finance GmbH; Marvel Studios

Original release
- Network: Nicktoons
- Release: January 23 – November 29, 2009

Related
- The Avengers: Earth's Mightiest Heroes

Wolverine and the X-Men is an American superhero animated series produced by Marvel Studios. It is the fourth animated adaptation of the X-Men characters. In the show, Wolverine attempts to reassemble the X-Men and becomes their new leader, following a devastating incident that led to the disappearances of both Jean Grey and Charles Xavier.

== Plot ==
At the start of the series, the X-Men disband following an explosion that destroys the X-Mansion and causes Professor X and Jean Grey to disappear. One year later, Wolverine and Beast decide to reunite the X-Men after witnessing the rise of the Mutant Response Division, a government-supported organization dedicated to capturing mutants.

The X-Men receive funding from Angel and reunite with junior members Iceman, Shadowcat and Forge. However, the X-Men are unable to locate the group's other members without a competent telepath to operate Cerebro. Emma Frost arrives and volunteers to join the X-Men in exchange for helping them find Professor X. Frost finds Professor X on the shores of Genosha in the care of Magneto. After their arrival on Genosha, Magneto permits the X-Men to take Professor X into their care. Upon their return, Xavier telepathically contacts a future version of the X-Men, who originate from a dystopian future twenty years from the present.

Meanwhile, Magneto welcomes new mutants to Genosha, one of whom is Nightcrawler. Magneto claims that Genosha is a safe and secure area for mutants, rather than a threat. Nightcrawler initially believes this, but later learns that Magneto is exploiting other mutants for power. Nightcrawler escapes, but is captured by Mystique when he arrives back at the mansion.

Cyclops has constant memories about Jean Grey and is depressed. He believes she is still alive, so, with the help of Frost, he seeks out Mister Sinister. The X-Men and Mister Sinister have a confrontation that does not result in them finding out any new info about Jean's whereabouts. Wolverine has Cyclops swear an oath to be in the X-Men again and promise not to go off searching for Jean. Somewhere across town, Jean is shown waking up in a hospital after months of being in a coma.

In the series finale, "Foresight", it is revealed that the destruction of the X-Mansion was caused by Jean Grey, who had unknowingly unleashed the Phoenix Force while defending herself against a telepathic attack led by Emma Frost. However, Emma's true motivation was heroic: she sought to save both Jean Grey and the entire world from the destructive power of the Phoenix Force. She genuinely believed that the Inner Circle was an ancient organization that had protected the world from the Phoenix for generations, as demonstrated by her own explanation to Jean and the historical murals she showed her. Emma believed their mission was to separate the Phoenix Force from Jean and destroy it before it could threaten the world. Unbeknownst to her, the other members of the Inner Circle were actually villains who intended to control the Phoenix Force for their own purposes. Emma was shocked upon discovering their true intentions and was equally horrified when Selene suggested killing the X-Men, openly protesting, "Since when do we kill people? We're supposed to save lives, not take them!" Upon realizing that she had been deceived, Emma turned against the Inner Circle and ultimately sacrificed her own life to destroy the Phoenix Force, saving Jean Grey, the X-Men, and the entire world.

The now fully reformed X-Men are praised for their actions by Professor Xavier, but are warned that the initial future has been replaced with a new timeline dominated by Apocalypse.

== Characters ==
The overall situations and the look of the series and character designs were inspired by the Astonishing X-Men comic series.

=== X-Men (present) ===
- Wolverine (Leader)
- Beast (second-in-command)
- Cyclops
- Storm
- Nightcrawler
- Angel
- Shadowcat
- Iceman
- Rogue
- Colossus
- Jean Grey
- Forge
- Emma Frost

=== X-Men (future) ===
- Professor X
- Bishop
- Berzerker
- Domino
- Hellion
- Firestar
- Kamal
- Marrow
- Polaris
- Rover
- Vanisher
- Wolverine
- X-23

=== Brotherhood of Mutants ===
- Quicksilver
- Avalanche
- Blob
- Toad
- Domino
- Rogue

=== Acolytes ===
- Magneto
- Mystique
- Scarlet Witch
- Polaris
- Scanner
- Pyro
- Blink
- Juggernaut
- Mercury
- Seamus Mellencamp
- Suvik Senyaka
- Kleinstock Brothers

=== Marauders ===
- Mister Sinister
- Arclight
- Blockbuster
- Harpoon
- Multiple Man
- Vertigo
- Archangel

=== Inner Circle ===
- Sebastian Shaw
- Donald Pierce
- Harry Leland
- Selene Gallio
- Emma Frost
- Stepford Cuckoos

=== Mutant Response Division/Project Wideawake ===
- Robert Kelly
- Warren Worthington II (father of Angel)
- Bolivar Trask
- Sentinels
  - Prowlers
  - Master Mold
- Sybil Zane
- Colonel Moss
- Kavita Rao
- Agent Haskett
- Dr. Peterson

=== Weapon X ===
- Truett Hudson / Prof. Andre Thorton
- Abraham Cornelius
- Sabretooth
- Maverick

=== Other mutants ===
- Apocalypse
- Big Bertha
- Boom Boom
- Dazzler
- DJ
- Dust
- Feral
- Fever Pitch
- Firestar
- Gambit
- M
- Magma
- Network
- Nitro
- Petra (Maverick's daughter)
- Pixie
- Psylocke
- Quill
- Rachel Summers
- Rockslide
- Roulette
- Sauron
- Shadow King
- Shatter
- Kenuichio Harada / Silver Samurai
- Squid-Boy
- Surge
- Synch
- Tildie Soames
- Hope Abbott / Trance
- Vanessa Carlysle
- Vindaloo
- Washout
- Wolf Cub
- Wolfsbane

=== Supporting characters ===
- Mojo
- Spiral
- Reavers
  - Angelo Macon
  - Murray Reese
  - Ricochet
  - Wade Cole
- Nick Fury
- Bruce Banner / Hulk
- Wendigo
- Mariko Yashida

== Episodes ==
No.	Title	Directed by	Written by	Original release date	Prod. code
1	"Hindsight (Part 1)"	Boyd Kirkland	Greg Johnson & Craig Kyle (story); Greg Johnson (writer)	January 23, 2009	101
A mysterious huge explosion destroys the X-Mansion at the moment that Wolverine was leaving. Professor X and Jean Grey are mysteriously missing, and perhaps gone for good, causing the X-Men to disband. Beast is examining the remains of the explosion and finds out that Professor X was the target. However, one year later, an anti-mutant government agency called the Mutant Response Division (or M.R.D. for short) hunt Wolverine and arrest a man named Randy and his family for helping him. This causes him to go after them with the help of Beast. Inside the jail, they free all the mutants, including Dust, Boom Boom, Spyke, and Pyro. In the end, Wolverine decides to find the other X-Men and fight the MRD. Introducing characters: Beast, Boom Boom, Colossus, Cyclops, Dust, Iceman, Jean Grey, Colonel Moss, Nightcrawler, Professor X, Pyro, Robert Kelly, Rockslide, Rogue, Shadowcat, Spyke, Storm, Warren Worthington II, Wolfsbane, and Wolverine
2	"Hindsight (Part 2)"	Steven E. Gordon	Greg Johnson & Craig Kyle (story); Greg Johnson (writer)	January 23, 2009	102
Beast and Wolverine manage to bring Shadowcat and Iceman back the X-Men, while some such as Cyclops, Colossus, and Rogue, do not wish to return. Rogue takes up the cause of the Brotherhood of Evil Mutants, who have sinister plans to attack Senator Kelly. Kelly's plan is to push forth a Mutant Registration Act. Meanwhile, Angel's father, Warren Worthington, is funding the M.R.D., building anti-mutant robots. The remaining X-Men seek to stop the Brotherhood, despite Kelly's stance on mutants. It is later revealed that Rogue had betrayed the X-Men. Introducing characters: Angel, Avalanche, Blob, Domino, Quicksilver, Toad
3	"Hindsight (Part 3)"	Nick Filippi	Greg Johnson & Craig Kyle (story); Greg Johnson (writer)	January 30, 2009	103
With help from Angel, the X-Men move back into the rebuilt mansion. Forge has been brought to the team to repair Cerebro and the Blackbird. Emma Frost, the former headmistress of the Massachusetts Academy, requests to join the X-Men to help find Professor X. Wolverine is suspicious in the beginning but agrees, believing that Emma only intends to control Cerebro. Emma Frost is able to locate Professor X in Magneto's controlled mutant nation of Genosha. Now with Cyclops back in action, Wolverine leads the X-Men on a mission into enemy territory to retrieve their lost mentor.
4	"Overflow"	Doug Murphy	Greg Johnson & Craig Kyle (story); Zoë Green (writer)	February 6, 2009	104
Professor X shows Wolverine a future vision of a destroyed Africa and reveals that Storm is the one who destroyed it. It isn't long before the Shadow King tries to take control of Storm's body. Following Emma Frost's victory over Shadow King, Storm rejoins the X-Men. Introducing characters: Shadow King
5	"Thieves' Gambit"	Steven E. Gordon	Greg Johnson & Craig Kyle (story); Bob Forward (writer)	February 13, 2009	105
Magma is being chased by the M.R.D. In the middle of a road she turns to a burning lava-like being and the cars suddenly stop around her. Wolverine rescues Magma from the M.R.D. and uses an inhibitor collar built by Forge to control her mutant abilities. When Wolverine asks for the collar back, she is reluctant to take it off but finally does so. Meanwhile, Sybil Zane hires Gambit to steal the collar and it is up to Wolverine to get it back. Gambit attacks Wolverine and admits that he has been hired for cash, but Wolverine sets his money on fire and offers him double the amount if he helps discovering whom he is working for. Introducing characters: Gambit, Sybil Zane, Bolivar Trask, Magma
6	"X-Calibre"	Nick Filippi	Greg Johnson & Craig Kyle (story); Christopher Hicks & Francis Lombard (writers)	February 20, 2009	106
There is news that Nightcrawler was seen on a ship traveling to Genosha with other mutants, so the X-Men try to find him. Meanwhile, Nightcrawler and the other travellers (including Squid-Boy, Vindaloo, Network, Shatter, Pixie, Feral, and other mutants) are intercepted by "pirates", who really are Spiral and the Reavers, looking for fighters to take to Mojo. During the night, the pirates attack the ship carrying the mutants to Genosha and the crew is worried about the change of course towards Genosha. Nightcrawler defeats the pirates. Wolverine, Beast, Shadowcat, and Forge come to pick him up and take him back to the mansion. But he declines, saying he wants to make sure the mutants make it to Genosha. Introducing characters: Mojo, Network, Shatter, Pixie, Vindaloo, Reavers, Spiral, Feral, Squid-Boy
7	"Wolverine vs. the Hulk"	Doug Murphy	Greg Johnson & Craig Kyle & Christopher Yost (story); Christopher Yost (writer)	February 27, 2009	107
In a sequel to Hulk Vs, Nick Fury and S.H.I.E.L.D. intervene on the MRD's hunt on Wolverine. Nick Fury asks Wolverine a "favor" to once again fight against the Hulk in exchange for keeping the X-Men's identities and the Xavier Institute secret. However, Wolverine finds that there is more than Fury is letting on when Wolverine and the Hulk encounter the Wendigo. Wolverine keeps the Wendigoes busy while Bruce Banner creates a cure. With Fury confirming to Wolverine and Banner that the Wendigo was a failed attempt at making super-soldiers, Wolverine threatens to disclose Fury's exploits if he ever reveals the names and location of the X-Men to the public. He then leaves and punches Banner so Hulk can get his revenge on Fury. Introducing characters: Hulk, Bruce Banner, Wendigo, Nick Fury
8	"Time Bomb"	Steve Gordon	Greg Johnson & Craig Kyle (story); Len Uhley (writer)	March 6, 2009	108
Professor X warns the X-Men that Nitro will self-detonate in Genosha, killing half of all mutants. The Brotherhood "rescue" Nitro from an MRD prison against his will and use Psylocke to control him, planning to use him as a weapon. The X-Men chase the Brotherhood to prevent Genosha's destruction. Introducing characters: Nitro, Psylocke
9	"Future X"	Nick Filippi	Greg Johnson & Craig Kyle (story); Christopher Yost (writer)	May 22, 2009	109
In the future, Professor X is captured by the Sentinels. Along with Domino, Bishop, Hellion, Marrow, and the others, the Professor plans to break free from his captors. Meanwhile, Wolverine and the other X-Men search Bolivar Trask's old lab for info on Master Mold. Introducing characters: Berzerker, Bishop, Firestar, Hellion, Kamal, Marrow, Master Mold, Vanisher, Rover
10	"Greetings from Genosha"	Doug Murphy	Greg Johnson & Craig Kyle (story); Christopher Yost (writer)	May 29, 2009	110
The ship Nightcrawler is on arrives in Genosha, where he meets and falls in love with the Scarlet Witch. However, Dust informs Nightcrawler that things in Genosha aren't what they seem. Meanwhile, Mystique breaks into the X-Mansion and apparently has a past link with Wolverine. Dust reveals to Nightcrawler that Magneto has imprisoned some mutants in an underground dungeon, before getting caught herself. Nightcrawler summons all of his teleportation abilities to get back to the X-Mansion, only to be captured by Mystique posing as Wolverine. She contacts Magneto about this victory as Magneto states that he has a special prison made for him. Introducing characters: Fever Pitch, Seamus Mellencamp, Dazzler, Mercury, Mystique, Quill, Sauron, Scanner, Scarlet Witch, Senyaka
11	"Past Discretions"	Steven E. Gordon	Greg Johnson & Craig Kyle (story); Paul Giacoppo (writer)	June 5, 2009	111
Wolverine goes to recover part of his past as a Weapon X agent and finds Maverick's daughter. As Weapon X doesn't want Logan to remember anything about his time in their organization, they send Sabretooth to deal with him. Meanwhile, Rogue finds it hard to adjust to her new settings as she overhears Quicksilver getting a mission from Magneto. When she finally visits the X-Mansion, she is upset to learn that Wolverine is not there. Introducing characters: Abraham Cornelius, Christy Nord, Maverick, Professor Thorton, and Sabretooth
12	"eXcessive Force"	Nicholas Filippi	Greg Johnson & Craig Kyle & Christopher Yost (story); Christopher Yost (writer)	June 12, 2009	112
Cyclops, still lamenting the loss of his dear beloved Jean Grey, believes Mister Sinister has taken her. He fights the Marauders with the help of the X-Men until he realizes Jean is not with them. An amnesiac Jean is revealed to be alive and well in a hospital, supposedly having been in a coma. Introducing characters: Arclight, Blockbuster, Harpoon, Mister Sinister, Multiple Man, and Vertigo
13	"Battle Lines"	Doug Murphy	Greg Johnson & Craig Kyle & Christopher Yost (story); Christopher Yost (writer)	June 19, 2009	113
Magneto sends his Acolytes to break several mutants out of prison. Meanwhile, the X-Men fight the Brotherhood and find Tildie Soames (a young mutant whose nightmares can manifest into monsters) is attacking the city while still in a coma-like state. Rogue's true purpose in joining the Brotherhood is revealed and she has to make a choice between her old friends and her new ones. Meanwhile, Bobby sums up the courage to ask Kitty out on a date. Introducing characters: Blink, The Kleinstocks, Juggernaut, Kavita Rao, Tildie Soames, and Polaris
14	"Stolen Lives"	Steve Gordon	Greg Johnson & Craig Kyle & Christopher Yost (story); Joshua Fine (writer)	July 31, 2009	114
Mystique calls Wolverine to warn him that Maverick's daughter, Christy, is in danger. The two of them infiltrate Weapon X and have to fight Maverick and Sabretooth and some old ghosts from the past as well. Introducing characters: X-23
15	"Hunting Grounds"	Nick Filippi	Greg Johnson & Craig Kyle & Christopher Yost (story); Max Botkin (writer)	August 7, 2009	115
Mojo takes Scarlet Witch and an imprisoned Nightcrawler from Genosha to put them in a TV show. Having heard from Pyro about what happened to Scarlet Witch, Polaris asks Magneto about it. Assuming that Nightcrawler somehow broke out and abducted Scarlet Witch, Magneto orders his Acolytes to find Nightcrawler. Though he does throw Pyro into Nightcrawler's cell telling him that he has "done enough". Mojo also forces a mind-controlled Wolverine to attack them. Spiral and the Reavers also appear to aid the mind-controlled Wolverine.
16	"Badlands"	Doug Murphy	Greg Johnson & Craig Kyle & Christopher Yost (story); Kevin Hopps (writer)	August 14, 2009	116
In the twenty-year future, Professor Xavier and his new X-Men fight the Sentinels and come across Polaris, who lives alone and traumatized in a destroyed Genosha. Charles learns how Genosha was destroyed and how Polaris was the only survivor. In the present, Wolverine, Forge, and Shadowcat infiltrate an MRD base to investigate the Master Mold only for the former two to get caught which led to the Wolverine-type Sentinels that the future X-Men just evaded.
17	"Code of Conduct"	Boyd Kirkland	Greg Johnson & Craig Kyle (story); Bob Forward (writer)	August 21, 2009	117
Wolverine comes back to the mansion to discover that the Silver Samurai had captured the X-Men. Having been defeated by Wolverine a few years ago, the Samurai forces Wolverine to fight him to death and regain his honor to officially become a Yakuza clan leader. The odds are stacked against Wolverine as the rules of the duel restrict him from using his claws and he has long since forgotten how to fight with a sword. To assist Wolverine, Professor X dives into Wolverine's memories of when he was trained by a swordmaster named Sensei Ogun. Introducing characters: Silver Samurai, Mariko Yashida, Sensei Ogun
18	"Backlash"	Steve Gordon	Greg Johnson & Craig Kyle & Christopher Yost (story); Christopher Yost (writer)	August 28, 2009	118
The MRD starts hunting mutants without warning as part of Project Wideawake, forcing the X-Men to strike back. Angel joins the X-Men and tries to destroy the artificial intelligence/multi-agent system Master Mold, accompanied by the Brotherhood who were betrayed by Magneto. However, the dystopian future still exists and Master Mold transfers to a damaged Sentinel.
19	"Guardian Angel"	Nick Filippi	Greg Johnson & Craig Kyle & Christopher Yost (story); Boyd Kirkland (writer)	September 4, 2009	119
After furiously snapping at his father Warren Worthington II on the development of a so-called "cure" for mutants, Angel's wings are severely damaged at the hands of the MRD and are ordered to be cut off with Warren Worthington II scolding Colonel Moss for what happened to his son. However, Mr. Sinister then makes him a proposal that will change his life forever, transforming Angel into Archangel and with even stronger angelic wings. Introducing characters: Archangel
20	"Breakdown"	Doug Murphy	Greg Johnson & Craig Kyle & Joshua Fine (story); Greg Johnson (writer)	September 11, 2009	120
During a battle with Juggernaut, Cyclops is distracted by a vision of Jean and Juggernaut defeats and escapes the X-Men. Emma proposes to erase all memories of Jean from Scott's mind and he accepts. When Emma enters his mind, she looks at all his memories. The truth behind the explosion is revealed to be Jean transforming into the Phoenix. Introducing characters: Phoenix Force (flashback), John Grey (flashback)
21	"Rover"	Steve Gordon	Greg Johnson & Craig Kyle & Joshua Fine (story); Greg Johnson (writer)	September 18, 2009	121
Cyclops and Wolverine inform Professor X of Emma's discovery about the source of the explosion. Fearing that Jean may be responsible for the destruction of Genosha, Professor X and his team of future X-Men try to uncover information on the event from Master Mold's original detention center. The only seen way to get past the Sentinel guards is to send the group's reprogrammed Sentinel "Rover" on a "Kamikaze" attack run. While Bishop has no problem with it, Marrow has developed an incredible bond to Rover and refuses to give him up.
22	"Aces and Eights"	Nick Filippi	Greg Johnson & Craig Kyle & Joshua Fine (story); Greg Johnson (writer)	September 25, 2009	122
Gambit arrives on Genosha under the orders of Senator Kelly to steal Magneto's helmet as a provocation of war, as well as cripple Genosha's resources. Much to the dismay of the Scarlet Witch, Gambit charms Polaris who unknowingly aids him in his task. Wolverine and Nightcrawler head to Genosha to prevent Gambit from stealing Magneto's helmet. Though Gambit seems attracted to Polaris, he leaves her at the end with Magneto's helmet. Polaris gets infuriated and disables Gambit's get away and takes the helmet back. Gambit is then stranded in the ocean. Through the intervention of the X-Men, Magneto, and Senator Kelly reach an understanding about their impending war and the dystopian future.
23	"Shades of Grey"	Doug Murphy	Greg Johnson & Craig Kyle (story); Greg Johnson (writer)	November 20, 2009	123
An amnesic Jean uses her incredibly strong and powerful telepathic and telekinetic abilities while at the hospital, which allows Emma to locate her using Cerebro. Emma and Scott go to the hospital and attempt to take Jean back to the mansion when Archangel intercepts Scott and Jean and takes them to Mr. Sinister where he extracts their genetic codes, stating that combined they will create the very strongest and most powerful force in the world. Before the Marauders can dispose of Scott and Jean, the X-Men arrive and save them. Later, Emma appears to double-cross the X-Men and the Hellfire Club arrives to take an unconscious Jean. Meanwhile, Mister Sinister gives Jean and Scott's DNA to his master Apocalypse. Introducing characters: Apocalypse, Sebastian Shaw, Selene, Donald Pierce, and Harry Leland
24	"Foresight (Part 1)"	Steve Gordon	Greg Johnson & Craig Kyle & Joshua Fine (story); Greg Johnson (writer)	November 29, 2009	124
Suspecting Emma's hand in Jean's abduction, Wolverine places her in a holding cell. Emma is later freed by Cyclops, who trusts her to find Jean. Apparently, the Hellfire Club had become aware that the Phoenix Force had possessed Jean and supposedly wants to extract the divine Phoenix Force from her mind and use its infinite and limitless power and strength for their own ends. Meanwhile, Magneto hatches a plot against the human race, having replaced Senator Kelly with Mystique to start an attack on Genosha. In the future, the Professor is apprehended by Sentinels, who have replicated Cerebro to find all mutants in the world. Introducing characters: Stepford Cuckoos
25	"Foresight (Part 2)"	Nick Filippi	Greg Johnson & Craig Kyle & Joshua Fine (story); Greg Johnson (writer)	November 29, 2009	125
Emma discovers the Hellfire Club's true motivation for using the Phoenix Force, and fights to free Jean alongside Cyclops. In Genosha, Magneto's plan comes to fruition as Sentinels ravage the island, providing just cause for Magneto's war against humanity. Accordingly, Magneto reprograms the Sentinels to attack humans with help from Mystique posing as Senator Kelly who is imprisoned in Genosha. In the future, Professor X and the future X-Men are freed by Wolverine and X-23. Together, they take up a fight against Master Mold. Introducing characters: Leech
26	"Foresight (Part 3)"	Boyd Kirkland	Greg Johnson & Craig Kyle & Joshua Fine (story); Greg Johnson (writer)	November 29, 2009	126
The X-Men, MRD and S.H.I.E.L.D. fight against Magneto's Sentinels. Meanwhile, the Inner Circle reveals to Scott that Emma and the Stepford Cuckoos were the ones responsible for setting in motion the events that would lead to the destruction of the mansion, Xavier's twenty-year coma and the eventual extraction of the Phoenix Force from Jean's mind and body. Upon the successful transmission of the Phoenix Force from Jean and into the bodies of all five Stepford Cuckoos, the possessed girls are then instructed by Sebastian Shaw to destroy the Sentinels, the X-Men and Genosha, an action which was completely unknown to Emma whose initial plan was to both locate and destroy the cosmic entity before it could reach maturity and bring forth unparalleled global destruction. Magneto and the Sentinels are defeated as Magneto tells Quicksilver to get him back to Genosha. In the wake of her regrettable actions, Emma attempts to redeem herself in the eyes of the X-Men, especially Scott, by ultimately sacrificing herself to destroy the Phoenix Force. In the aftermath of the carnage, Scarlet Witch and Polaris lose faith in Magneto's cause. As Scarlet Witch tells Quicksilver that he is always welcomed in Genosha, it is no longer their father's country. Scarlet Witch and Polaris then have Blink teleport Magneto and Quicksilver away. From the future, Xavier informs the X-Men that their mission was a success and that the bleak, Sentinel-run world has now been avoided. However, there is a new and far more formidable future that has taken its place: the Age of Apocalypse. As Professor X's mansion is intact in this future, the final scene zooms in on a high-tech pyramid as Apocalypse, Mister Sinister, and a one-eyed Cyclops are about to address the crowd below.

== Voice cast ==
=== Main voice cast ===
- Steve Blum – James "Logan" Howlett / Wolverine, Vanisher, Vindaloo, Fever Pitch, Reavers
- Susan Dalian – Storm, Kavita Rao
- Jennifer Hale – Jean Grey, Boom Boom
- Danielle Judovits – Shadowcat, Tildie Soames, Young Christy Nord
- Tom Kane – Magneto, Professor Thorton
- Yuri Lowenthal – Iceman
- Nolan North – Cyclops, Colossus, Pyro, Berzerker
- Liam O'Brien – Angel / Archangel, Nightcrawler, Nitro
- Roger Craig Smith – Forge, Hellion, Kamal
- Fred Tatasciore – Beast, Hulk, Blockbuster, Juggernaut, Harpoon
- Kieren van den Blink – Rogue
- Kari Wahlgren – Emma Frost, Sybil Zane Magma, Adult Christy Nord
- Jim Ward – Professor X, Warren Worthington II, Abraham Cornelius, Sentinels, Rover

=== Additional voices ===
- Charlie Adler – Mojo, Reavers
- Tamara Bernier – Mystique
- Clancy Brown – Mister Sinister
- Benjamin Bryan – Young Scott Summers
- A. J. Buckley – Toad
- Corey Burton – John Grey
- Grey DeLisle – Psylocke, Spiral, Network
- Alex Désert – Nick Fury
- Richard Doyle – Robert Kelly
- Chris Edgerly – Agent Haskett
- Crispin Freeman – Multiple Man, Maverick
- Kate Higgins – Scarlet Witch, Pixie
- Mark Hildreth – Quicksilver
- Michael Ironside – Colonel Moss
- Dominic Janes – Squid-Boy
- Phil LaMarr – Gambit, Bolivar Trask
- Peter Lurie – Sabretooth
- Gabriel Mann – Bruce Banner
- Vanessa Marshall – Vertigo
- Graham McTavish – Sebastian Shaw
- Phil Morris - Randy
- Liza del Mundo – Polaris
- Laraine Newman – Marjorie
- Kevin Michael Richardson – Bishop, Shadow King
- James Sie – Sensei Ogun
- André Sogliuzzo – Arclight
- Stephen Stanton – Blob
- April Stewart – Selene
- Tara Strong – Marrow, Dust, Firestar, X-23, Stepford Cuckoos
- James Patrick Stuart – Avalanche
- Gwendoline Yeo – Domino, Master Mold, Mariko Yashida
- Keone Young – Silver Samurai

== Crew ==
- Jamie Simone - Casting and Voice Director

== Production ==
Toonz Animation India and First Serve International formed a joint venture Toonz First Serve to produce Wolverine. By November 2007, Toonz First Serve began production on the series.

On November 4, 2008, a second season, consisting of 26 episodes was confirmed as being in production by Toonz Entertainment and Marvel Animation. During Comic Con 2009, images of season 2 were shown, consisting of Bastion, Cable, Colossus, Deadpool, Havok, Jubilee, and Magik. It was announced that these characters were to appear in season 2. Colossus was set to receive a reintroductory storyline and would have been a regular character in season 2. Joshua Fine also revealed that Holocaust, Sunfire, and Unus the Untouchable would have made appearances in season 2. Joshua Fine confirmed that Deadpool would have been in a Weapon X episode also featuring X-23 / Laura Kinney, and other obscure characters.

=== Cancellation ===
On April 13, 2010, Comics Continuum reported that (according to an inside source) a second season seemed very unlikely. On April 15, 2010, Marvel Animation Age confirmed the recent report that Wolverine and the X-Men would not be returning for a second season. The reason for this was due to financial problems with their financing partner.

=== Later allusions in other Marvel media ===
- Steve Blum, Tom Kane, and Fred Tatasciore reprise their respective roles as Wolverine, Professor Thornton, and Hulk in Hulk Vs. Wolverine.
- Alex Désert, Gabriel Mann, Fred Tatasciore, Steve Blum, and Tom Kane reprise their respective roles as Nick Fury, Bruce Banner, Hulk, Wolverine, and Professor Thornton in The Avengers: Earth's Mightiest Heroes.
- Nolan North reprises his role as Cyclops in Black Panther.
- Steve Blum, Jim Ward, and A.J. Buckley reprise their roles as Wolverine, Professor X, and Toad in The Super Hero Squad Show.
- Steve Blum, Liam O'Brien, Jim Ward, and Tom Kane each return as Wolverine, Nightcrawler, Professor X, and Magneto in Marvel Super Hero Squad: The Video Game.
- Steve Blum, Tara Strong, Tom Kane, Susan Dalian, Jennifer Hale, and Jim Ward reprise their roles as Wolverine, X-23, Magneto, Storm, Jean Grey, and the Sentinel in Marvel vs. Capcom 3: Fate of Two Worlds and Ultimate Marvel vs. Capcom 3.
- Steve Blum, Nolan North, Phil LaMarr, and Kari Wahlgren reprise their roles of Wolverine, Cyclops, Gambit, and Emma Frost in X-Men: Destiny.
- Steve Blum, Jennifer Hale, and Fred Tatasciore reprise their roles of Wolverine, Jean Grey, and Beast in Marvel Anime: X-Men while Gwendoline Yeo reprises her role of Mariko Yashida in Marvel Anime: Wolverine.
- Steve Blum, Kate Higgins, Liam O'Brien, Fred Tatasciore, Kari Wahlgren, Danielle Judovits and Jim Ward reprise their roles as Wolverine, Scarlet Witch, Nightcrawler, Beast, the Hulk, Emma Frost, Shadowcat, and Professor X in Marvel Heroes.
- Steve Blum, Tom Kane, Kate Higgins, Jennifer Hale, and Liam O'Brien reprise their respective roles as Wolverine, Magneto, Scarlet Witch, Phoenix, and Nightcrawler in Marvel: Ultimate Alliance 3: The Black Order. Fred Tatasciore also reprises his roles as the Hulk and Beast.
- Jennifer Hale reprise her role as Jean Grey in X-Men '97, a continuation of the 1992 animated series produced by Marvel Studios Animation.

== Broadcast history ==
=== United States ===
On May 1, 2008, the show was pre-sold to Nicktoons Network in the United States and was set for a Spring 2009 airdate. It was also confirmed in an article by USA Today's website in which it specifically mentions the cartoon starting on January 23, 2009, on Nicktoons Network. On January 23, 2009, the show premiered in the United States, with the first two episodes shown back-to-back on Nicktoons Network, which were re-aired on Nickelodeon two days later. The next 6 episodes followed weekly before a two-month break. New episodes began on May 22, 2009, as advertised with commercials on the channel then stopped after June 19, 2009, till the network advertised that they will be showing new episodes on July 31, 2009, after or before new episodes of Iron Man: Armored Adventures.

=== United Kingdom ===
On June 23, 2008, a second preview for the series, starring the main X-Men team, was released to announce the special screening of the 3-part pilot episodes that aired at San Diego Comic-Con in late July 2008. Press releases indicated that the first episode was due to premiere on August 2, 2008, on BBC Two in the UK, however, it was postponed and premiered on January 4, 2009, on the CBBC Channel. Initially, one new episode aired every Sunday, but on January 25, 2009, CBBC started airing two new episodes every Sunday. The time slots varied, and the episodes were available for viewing on the BBC iPlayer for a limited time after they aired. As of mid-February 2009, some new episodes were shown on weekdays instead of at the weekend. Some episodes with scenes showing heavy violence were censored and Episode 17 was not shown on CBBC as there was a duel to the death in the storyline (along with one scene depicting blood). CBBC in the UK overtook Canada on March 4, 2009, when it aired the 20th episode, "Breakdown.”

In 2009, BBC Alba started broadcasting the series dubbed into Scottish Gaelic as "An Sionnach Sgianach is Na Seòid".

The show later aired on Kix, beginning in November 2013.

=== Canada ===
Early news had speculated the show to air in Fall 2008 in the United States. The series started airing on YTV on Saturday, September 6, 2008, in the 7:00 p.m. time slot. When its time slot was switched to Saturday morning programming, Crunch, it aired at 11:30 a.m. Starting in January 2009, the show was also shown on Teletoon, where only episodes that previously aired on YTV were shown.

=== Latin America and Brazil ===
In July 2008, the series was pre-sold to Jetix. starting August 25, 2008 from Mondays to Thursdays at 4:30 p.m. Unusually, all 26 episodes of the first season were aired in Brazil and Latin America before the series started in any other country. Also, the series airs in Rede Record in Brazil from Mondays to Fridays at 7:00 p.m., starting November 9, 2009. In Mexico, the series aired on Azteca 7.

=== Australia ===
In Australia, the first series aired on ABC1 Sunday mornings. The series was then repeated weekdays in early morning and late afternoon timeslots. The show then aired on ABC3, along with other series from Marvel Animation on Sunday nights.

== Merchandise ==
Hasbro produced a Wolverine and the X-Men toyline as a tie-in to the series. The first wave consisted of Avalanche, Beast, Colossus, Cyclops, Logan (not in classic outfit), Iceman, Magneto, and Wolverine. Wave two contained the new figures Nightcrawler and a Black Uniform Wolverine. Wave Three, the final wave, added Forge and Toad to the line. The toy line ended before any of the main females of the series were given toys; notably missing were Emma Frost, Jean Grey, Shadowcat, Rogue, and Storm.

== Reception ==
Professional ratings
Aggregate scores
Source	Rating
Rotten Tomatoes	67%
Review scores
Source	Rating
Common Sense Media	4/5 stars
IGN	9/10

On review aggregator Rotten Tomatoes, 67% of 6 critics gave the series a positive review.

Due in part to the abundance of advertising for the series done by Nicktoons and Marvel, the Nicktoons premiere of Wolverine and the X-Men on January 23, 2009 became one of the network's highest ratings ever. Its debut episode, "Hindsight, Part One", garnered 436,000 viewers. The following episode, "Hindsight, Part Two", garnered 589,000 viewers.

== Home media ==
In September 25, 2007, Liberation Entertainment secured worldwide home media rights to the series except in the United States.

=== United Kingdom ===
In April 2009, it was announced that E1 Entertainment had secured distribution rights to the series. Liberation had closed down its UK branch the previous October, hence the change in distributor. E1 released their first DVD release of the series in May 2009, containing seven episodes. The company released the rest of the series in three more numbered volumes - Volume 2 on October 19 (to coincide with the release of X-Men Origins: Wolverine on DVD), Volume 3 on February 8, 2010, and Volume 4 on July 26, 2010. The first two volumes contain seven episodes, while the last two contain six episodes. The complete boxed set with all twenty-six episodes was released by Entertainment One on July 11, 2011.

=== United States ===
On July 31, 2008, Marvel Entertainment announced that their long-term partner Lionsgate Home Entertainment would distribute the series on DVD in the United States. On April 21, 2009, they released Volume 1: Heroes Return Trilogy featuring the first three episodes. The next release, Volume 2: Deadly Enemies came out on July 21, 2009, and features the next five episodes. Volume 3: Beginning of the End was released on November 3, 2009, with five more episodes. Volume 4: Fate of the Future was released on February 2, 2010, with five more episodes. Volume 5: Revelation was released on May 4, 2010, along with Volume 5 of X-Men: The Animated Series. Marvel formally announced the sixth and final part of the series, Volume 6: Final Crisis Trilogy was released on August 17, 2010.

The complete series was released on DVD and Blu-ray on October 12, 2010. Alongside X-Men: The Animated Series and X-Men: Evolution, the entire series was released on Disney+ when it launched on November 12, 2019.

=== Canada ===
Liberation Entertainment released a single-disc "Season 1: Chapter 1" package on April 14, 2009, with the first four episodes of the series. A second single disc package, "Season 1: Chapter 2" holding the next four episodes was released on July 21, 2009, although the packaging mentioned a fifth episode that was not included for unknown reasons. Also, a 5-disc set of the complete first season in Steelbook packaging was released September 15, 2009. The set includes all 26 episodes in widescreen format, character bios, an image gallery and an audio commentary on the episode Overflow.

=== Australia ===
Magna Home Entertainment has announced that the full first season (26 episodes) has been released in Australia with a Limited Edition Wolverine Mold Case. Wolverine and the X-Men: X-Calibre (6 Episodes) and Wolverine and the X-Men: Wolverine VS The Hulk (6 Episodes) has been released with Wolverine and the X-Men: Hunting Grounds (7 Episodes) released on July 8, 2009. Wolverine and the X-Men: Breakdown (7 Episodes).

=== Italy ===
Panini Comics released the first season under its Panini Video imprint. It was the last DVD published by Panini.
