= Warsaw (video game) =

- Developer: Pixelated Milk
- Publisher: Pixelated Milk
- Engine: Unity
- Platforms: Windows, Nintendo Switch, PlayStation 4, PlayStation 5, Xbox One
- Release: Windows, Linux, Mac: WW: 2 October 2019; Switch: WW: 2 October 2019; PS4: WW: 2 October 2019; Xbox One: WW: 2 October 2019; PS5: WW: 12 November 2020
- Genres: Role-playing, turn-based
- Mode: Single-player

Warsaw (stylized as WARSAW) is a turn-based tactical role-playing video game developed and published by Polish studio Pixelated Milk, featuring art by Polish comic book artist Michał Śledziński. It was released for PlayStation 4, Microsoft Windows, Nintendo Switch and Xbox One on 2 October 2019, and later for PlayStation 5 on 12 November 2020.

== Gameplay ==
In-game screenshots

Combat screen

Headquarters screen

The game is set during the Warsaw Uprising in the summer of 1944, where the player has to enlist and manage a group of Polish Home Army members to fight against Nazi occupying forces, as well as manage skills and assign weapons.

== Reception ==
Reception

Aggregate score
Aggregator	Score
Metacritic	PC: 62/100; NS: 69/100; XBO: 71/100

Review scores
Publication	Score
IGN	7/10
Nintendo Life	7/10
RPGamer	3/5
The Games Machine (Italy)	8.3 / 10.0

Warsaw received generally mixed reviews, holding a score of 62 out of 100 in Metacritic. IGN Italy awarded it a score of 7 out of 10, saying "A fascinating historic backdrop, an original artistic direction, a compelling gameplay structure, but only one, inexorable difficulty level which often seems more unfair than faithful." Nintendo Life also awarded it a 7 out of 10, saying "Warsaw's a disheartening experience through and through, and normally that would be enough for a low score and some harsh words. But we think that, here, the futility is rather the point of the exercise. It's not going to be for everyone by any means, but fans of Valiant Hearts or This War of Mine will get a kick out of its stark, unforgiving world." RPGamer awarded it a 3 out of 5, saying "Warsaw may be a diamond in the rough for some: its nuanced battle system together with the tough resource management are the highlights of the experience, but some may be put off by the high difficulty that can be tempered with both experience in the game's mechanics and a sprinkling of luck."

Rock, Paper, Shotgun wrote that the game "has the makings of a genuinely fascinating, unyielding tactical game with a lot of heart and reverence for the events it's based on. Still, as is, it's currently a hard sell unless you're really intent on a challenge that, while thematically resonant, often feels more arbitrary than it is complex. Ian Walker from Kotaku wrote a harsher review for the game, describing it has a "tedious take" on Darkest Dungeon and concluding that: "It's not that I wish Warsaw was more like Darkest Dungeon, but its attempts to set itself apart from the game it so obviously remixes result in a tedious, confusing, and ultimately frustrating experience that takes away from its exceptional setting and world-building. Underneath the layers of homage and allusion, Warsaw has something special. It's just going to take a little more work to draw it out."

== See also ==
- Darkest Dungeon
