= Abelard Giza =

Polish comedian, writer, and filmmaker (born 1980)

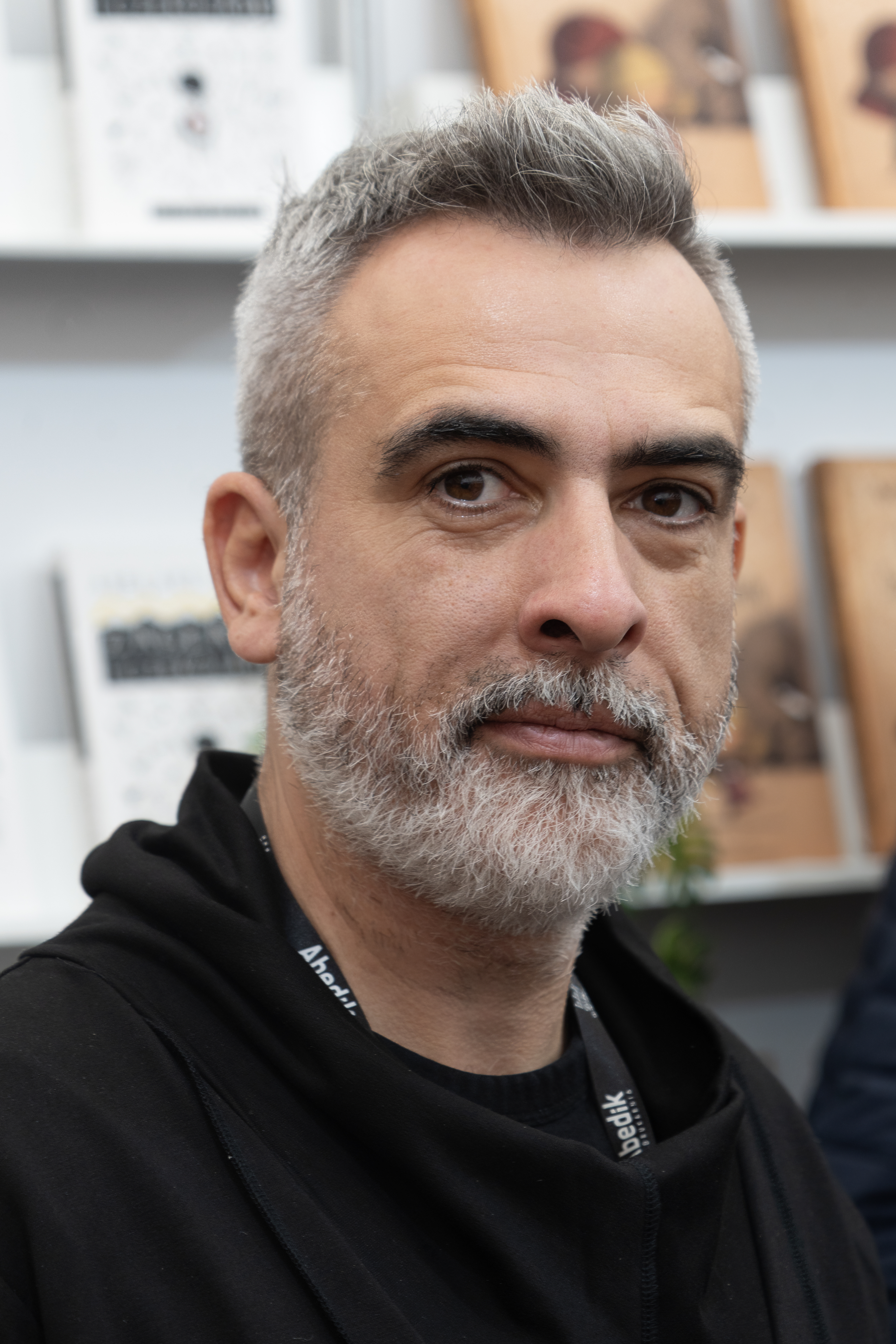
- Abelard Giza in 2025.
- Born: Abelard Piotr Giza; 15 September 1980 (age 46); Gdańsk, Poland
- Education: University of Gdańsk
- Occupations: Comedian; stand-up performer; writer; filmmaker; actor
- Years active: 1999 – present
- Spouse: Daria Zarówna-Giza
- Children: 2

Abelard Piotr Giza (Polish: [aˈbɛ.lart ˈpjɔtr ˈɡi.za]; born 15 September 1980) is a Polish comedian, stand-up performer, writer, filmmaker, and actor. He was a member and co-founder of the comedy group Kabaret Limo, which operated from 1999 to 2014. Giza created numerous stand-up comedy shows, including Proteus Vulgaris (2015), Ludzie, trzymajcie kapelusze (2016), Numer 3 (2018), Piniata (2019), Zaodrze (2021), and Wentyl (2024). He created, wrote, directed, and starred in the 2018 comedy drama web miniseries Kryzys, and co-wrote the 2018 comedy film Juliusz. He also wrote and directed several independent films, including Towar (2005), W stepie szerokim (2007), and Swing (2013). Additionally, he portrayed Mataj in the 2019 science fiction action film The Last Loner, and voiced Loser in the 2021 Netflix animated children's comedy series Kayko and Kokosh, and Johnny and Second Johnny in the 2025 animated adventure film Iggy the Eagle. Furthermore, Giza wrote books, including non-fiction books Łapy precz od żartów (2018), co-written with Jacek Stramik, and Zagłada i czekoladki (2021), as well as the collection of short stories, titled Otworzyć po mojej śmierci (2021). He also wrote the 2025 children's book Hania, Tyśka i Szajka Brudziaków, and together with Wojciech Tremiszewski, he wrote and narrated children's fantasy and science fiction audio play Mucha Lena (2021), and its sequel, Mucha Lena 2: Król Brokatu (2023).

== Early life and education ==
Abelard Giza was born on 15 September 1980 in Gdańsk, Poland, and grew up in the nearby town of Pruszcz Gdański. He is a grandson of painter Hugon Lasecki (born 1932), and a brother of painter Hugo Giza (born 1982). He has a degree in political science from the University of Gdańsk.

== Career ==
In 1999, he co-founded Kabaret Limo, a comedy group based in Gdańsk, which operated until 2014. As part of the film group 2,30/kg, which he founded, Giza created, wrote, and directed low-budget independent films Wożonko from 2003 and Towar from 2005. From 2007 to 2015, he a was member of the independent film group Grupa Impact, as part of which he wrote, directed, and produced W stepie szerokim in 2007, Swing in 2013. He was also a theatrical performer, as a member of the troupe Grupa Muflasz. He began performing stand-up comedy in 2010, being one of the first comedians in Poland to adopt the medium. His shows include: Proteus Vulgaris (2015), Ludzie, trzymajcie kapelusze (2016), Numer 3 (2018), Piniata (2019), Zaodrze (2021), and Wentyl (2024).

He created, wrote, directed, and starred in the 2018 comedy drama web miniseries Kryzys, and co-wrote the 2018 comedy film Juliusz. He also portrayed Mataj in the 2019 science fiction action film The Last Loner, and voiced Loser in the 2021 Netflix animated children's comedy series Kayko and Kokosh, and Johnny and Second Johnny in the 2025 animated adventure film Iggy the Eagle. He also voiced Ducky in the Polish-language dubbing version of the 2019 animated comedy drama film Toy Story 4. Additionally, he co-wrote scripts for two episodes of the 2021 drama anthology miniseries Planet Single: Eight Stories.

Giza also wrote books, including the non-fiction books Łapy precz od żartów (2018), co-written with Jacek Stramik, and Zagłada i czekoladki (2021), as well as the collection of short stories titled Otworzyć po mojej śmierci (2021). He also wrote the 2025 children's book Hania, Tyśka i Szajka Brudziaków. Furthermore, together with Wojciech Tremiszewski, he wrote and narrated children's fantasy and science fiction audio play Mucha Lena (2021), and its sequel, Mucha Lena 2: Król Brokatu (2023). He is also a columnist for the magazine Chichot, and hosts the podcast Strefa Gizy.

== Personal life ==
He is married to photographer Daria Zarówna-Giza, with whom he has two daughters, Mia and Ida. He lives in the town of Pruszcz Gdański in Pomeranian Voivodeship, Poland.

== Controversies ==
On 9 August 2013, the National Broadcasting Council of Poland imposed the fine of 5,000 Polish zloties onto the company Polish Television, for violating the article 18 of broadcasting law in Poland, regarding crossing the line of freedom of expression. It was done in response to the performance by comedy group Kabaret Limo, of which Giza was a member, in an episode of the TVP2 comedy show Dzięki Bogu już weekend. Tylko dla dorosłych, aired on 8 March 2013. During the episode, the group made jokes regarding the Catholic Church, which were deemed by some viewers as offending the religious feelings of the members of the Roman Catholic faith. This included a joke by Giza about Pope Francis, concerning the fact that "the Pope also farts". A complaint regarding the performance was filed by the members of the Sejm, Andrzej Jaworski, Bartosz Kownacki, and Małgorzata Sadurska, who belonged to the Law and Justice party. They also reported it as a criminal offence to the National Public Prosecutor's Office, which subsequently dismissed it. Following the controversy, several venues cancelled Giza's performances and several companies ceased partnership with him.

== Filmography ==
=== Acting ===
Year	Title	Role	Notes	Ref.
2004	Lokatorzy	Maciek	Television series; episode: "Kolacja noworoczna"	
2005	Towar	Police officer	Feature film	
2007	W stepie szerokim	Leopold	Feature film	
2008	For You and the Fire	Police officer	Feature film	
2014	Kajko i Kokosz: Szkoła latania	Kajko	Audio play	
2018	Juliusz	Gravedigger	Feature film	
2018	Kryzys	Abelard Giza	Television series; lead role; 4 episodes	
2019	The Last Loner	Mataj	Feature film	
2019	Toy Story 4	Ducky	Feature film; voice; Polish-language dubbing	
2020	Fluffy Stuff with Ducky and Bunny: Love	Ducky	Short film; voice; Polish-language dubbing	
2021	Kayko and Kokosh	Loser	Television series; voice; recurring role; 8 episodes	
2021	Mucha Lena	Bartek the Mosquito	Audio play	
2021	Mucha Lena	Damian the Butterfly	Audio play	
2021	Mucha Lena	Mieczysław the Snail	Audio play	
2021	Tom and Jerry	Real Estate Rat	Feature film; voice; Polish-language dubbing	
2023	Mucha Lena 2: Król Brokatu	Bartek the Mosquito	Audio play	
2023	Mucha Lena 2: Król Brokatu	Grażyna	Audio play	
2023	Mucha Lena 2: Król Brokatu	Raymond the Spider	Audio play	
2023	Mucha Lena 2: Król Brokatu	Florian	Audio play	
2023	Mucha Lena 2: Król Brokatu	Paulina the Dragonfly	Audio play	
2023	Mucha Lena 2: Król Brokatu	Hugo the Bumblebee	Audio play	
2024	Świetlik w ciemności		Audio play	
2025	Iggy the Eagle	Johnny	Television series; voice	
2025	Iggy the Eagle	Second Johnny	Television series; voice	

=== Filmmaking ===
Year	Title	Role	Notes	Ref.
2003	Wożonko	Director, producer, scriptwriter, cinematographer, editor	Feature film	
2005	Demo	Director, producer, scriptwriter	Short film	
2005	Towar	Director, producer, scriptwriter	Feature film	
2007	W stepie szerokim	Director, producer, scriptwriter, editor, sound effects artist	Feature film	
2013	Swing	Director, producer, scriptwriter	Feature film	
2018	Juliusz	Scriptwriter	Feature film	
2018	Kryzys	Director, producer, scriptwriter	Web miniseries	
2021	Planet Single: Eight Stories	Scriptwriter	Television series; 2 episodes	
2021	Mucha Lena	Scriptwriter	Audio play	
2023	Mucha Lena 2: Król Brokatu	Scriptwriter	Audio play	

== Theater credits ==
- Babie Doły (2001)
- Delektacja (2002)
- Atlantikon (2002)
- Truflasz, czyli polowanie na dzika (2006)
- Dżangyl (2007)

== Written works ==
Title	Publication date	Publisher	ISBN	Notes
Łapy precz od żartów	17 October 2018	Wielka Litera	9788380321793	Non-fiction book; co-written with Jacek Stramik
Zagłada i czekoladki	12 May 2021	Strefa Gizy	9788395968624	Non-fiction book
Otworzyć po mojej śmierci	14 December 2023	Strefa Gizy	—N/a	Collection of short stories
Hania, Tyśka i Szajka Brudziaków	24 October 2025	Strefa Gizy	9788395968686	Children's literature

== Stand-up comedy shows ==
- Stand up. Zabij mnie śmiechem (2010)
- Proteus Vulgaris (2015)
- Jeszcze To (2015)
- Ludzie, trzymajcie kapelusze (2016)
- Numer 3 (2018)
- Piniata (2019)
- Zaodrze (2021)
- Samertajm (2022)
- Wentyl (2024)

== Awards and decorations ==
- Award for Young Culture Creators of the City of Gdańsk (2008)

== Accolades and nominations ==
Awards and nominations received by Abelard Giza
Award	Year	Category	Nominated work	Result	Ref.
Barejada Independent Comedy Film Festival Awards	2007	Best script	W stepie szerokim	Won	
Cinemaforum Jan Machulski International Independent Feature Film Forum Awards	2005	Best editing	Towar	Nominated	
Cinemaforum Jan Machulski International Independent Feature Film Forum Awards	2005	Best film	Towar	2nd place	
Giżycko Film Festival Awards	2018	Best debut	Juliusz	Won	
Jan Machulski Award	2006	Best script	Towar	Won	
KAN Film Festival Awards	2005	Public's choice	Towar	Won	
Kolbudy Festival Awards	2005	Best feature film	Towar	Won	
National Comedy Film Festival Awards	2013	Best independent feature film	Swing	Won	
The Storm of the Year Award by Gazeta Wyborcza	2005	Film and multimedia	Towar	Won	
