= Susan Dalian =

American actress

- Born: Susan Olivia Patterson; September 15, 1968 (age 58); Baltimore, Maryland, U.S.
- Education: Boston University (BFA)
- Occupation: Actress

Susan Patterson Dalian (born September 15, 1968) is an American actress who is primarily known among anime fans as the voice of Haku in the first season of Naruto and for her role in the Screen Gems film The Brothers.

== Early life and education ==
Dalian was born in Baltimore. She graduated from the Baltimore School for the Arts and received a Bachelor of Fine Arts degree from Boston University.

== Career ==
Dalian received a nomination for Best Actress at the American Anime Awards in 2007. She voices Storm in Wolverine and the X-Men and Marvel vs. Capcom 3: Fate of Two Worlds. She also voices audio narration for novels. She has directed various theater productions and the short film Bite Me which was screened in 2019 at the Mammoth Lakes Film Festival and Festival Angaelica near Washougal, Washington.

She was one of several narrators of the 2021 book You Can't Say That! Writers for Young People Talk About Censorship, Free Expression, and the Stories They Have to Tell, edited by Leonard S. Marcus.

== Filmography ==
=== Film ===
| Year | Title | Role | Notes |
|---|---|---|---|
| 1998 | The Scottish Tale | Ginny | |
| 2000 | Disney's The Kid | Giselle | |
| 2001 | The Brothers | BeBe Fales | |
| 2002 | Undisputed | Jonelle | |
| 2006 | Room 6 | Carolyn | |
| 2006 | Ultimate Avengers 2: Rise of the Panther | Nakinda / Additional voices | |
| 2007 | I'm Through with White Girls | Jada | |
| 2010 | Morning | Nurse | |
| 2012 | H4 | Kate | |
| 2017 | The Diaries of Eden | Louella Benedict | |

=== Television ===
| Year | Title | Role | Notes |
|---|---|---|---|
| 1996 | Hang Time | Tracy Mower | 2 episodes |
| 1996–1997 | Star Trek: Voyager | Ensign Kaplan | 3 episodes |
| 1998 | Profiler | Eve Jackson | Episode: "Lethal Obsession" |
| 1999 | The Pretender | Gwen | Episode: "Murder 101" |
| 1999 | Felicity | Tina | 3 episodes |
| 2000 | The Practice | Hillary Pope | Episode: "Blowing Smoke" |
| 2001 | Hollywood 7 | Lovely | Episode: "Public Relations" |
| 2002 | The Hughleys | Camille | 2 episodes |
| 2004 | The Parkers | Jennifer | Episode: "School of Hard Knocks" |
| 2004 | Joey | Maureen | Episode: "Joey and the Book Club" |
| 2005 | What I Like About You | Melody | Episode: "The Wedding: Part 2" |
| 2005–2007 | Naruto | Haku / Yugao Uzuki | 14 episodes |
| 2006 | The Bernie Mac Show | Sales Rep | Episode: "Fantasy Football" |
| 2006 | Courting Alex | Karen | Episode: "You Compete Me" |
| 2006 | All of Us | Michele | Episode: "He's Gotta Have It" |
| 2006 | Love, Inc. | Linda | Episode: "Full House" |
| 2008–2009 | Wolverine and the X-Men | Storm / Dr. Kavita Rao | 9 episodes |
| 2010 | Greek | Proctor | Episode: "The Big Easy Does It" |
| 2010 | 90210 | Ms. Henry | Episode: "Catch Me If You Cannon" |
| 2012 | Blade: The Series | Carol | Episode: "Childhood Days (That Was Then, This Is Now)" |
| 2013–2014 | Naruto: Shippûden | Haku / Yûgao Uzuki | 5 episodes |
| 2023 | Not Dead Yet | Therapist | Episode: "Not Scattered Yet" |

=== Video games ===
| Year | Title | Role | Notes |
|---|---|---|---|
| 1993 | Police Quest: Open Season | Nicolette | |
| 2003 | RTX Red Rock | Cimmeria Rajan | |
| 2006 | Naruto: Ultimate Ninja | Haku | |
| 2006 | Naruto: Clash of Ninja | Haku | |
| 2006 | Naruto: Clash of Ninja 2 | Haku | |
| 2007 | Naruto: Ultimate Ninja 2 | Haku | |
| 2007 | Naruto: Path of the Ninja | Haku | |
| 2007 | Naruto: Rise of a Ninja | Haku | |
| 2008 | Naruto: Ultimate Ninja 3 | Haku | |
| 2008 | Naruto: Clash of Ninja Revolution 2 | Yugao Uzuki | |
| 2008 | Naruto: The Broken Bond | Haku | |
| 2009 | Naruto Shippûden: Ultimate Ninja 4 | Haku | |
| 2009 | Naruto Shippûden: Clash of Ninja Revolution 3 | Yugao Uzuki | |
| 2011 | Marvel vs. Capcom 3: Fate of Two Worlds | Storm | |
| 2011 | Ultimate Marvel vs. Capcom 3 | Storm | |
| 2012 | Naruto Shippuden: Ultimate Ninja Storm Generations | Haku | |
| 2013 | Naruto Shippuden: Ultimate Ninja Storm 3 | Haku | |
| 2014 | Naruto Shippuden: Ultimate Ninja Storm Revolution | Haku | |
| 2016 | Naruto Shippuden: Ultimate Ninja Storm 4 | Haku | |
| 2018 | Naruto to Boruto: Shinobi Striker | Haku | |
