= Kayko and Kokosh (TV series) =

Polish-language animated series

- Polish: Kajko i Kokosz
- Genre: Adventure; Comedy
- Created by: Ewelina Gordziejuk
- Based on: Kajko and Kokosz
- Written by: Maciej Kur; Rafał Skarżycki
- Voices of: Artur Pontek; Michał Piela
- Country of origin: Poland
- Original language: Polish
- No. of seasons: 3
- No. of episodes: 26

Production
- Executive producer: Ewelina Gordziejuk
- Running time: 13 minutes
- Production company: EGoFILM

Original release
- Network: Netflix
- Release: February 28 – November 17, 2021

Kayko and Kokosh (Polish: Kajko i Kokosz) is a Polish-language animated television series based on the comic series Kajko and Kokosz by Janusz Christa. The series was developed by EGoFILM studio and is the first Polish animated Netflix original series. It premiered on 28 February 2021, and since 1 December the same year, the series has been distributed worldwide.

All episodes were written by Maciej Kur, who is also the writer of the newest volumes of the Kajko and Kokosz comic book series, and Rafał Skarżycki. Directors include comic book author Michał Śledziński.

== Cast ==
- Artur Pontek as Kayko
- Michał Piela as Kokosh
- Jarosław Boberek as Mirmił, a castellan of the settlement
- Agata Kulesza as Jaga, Kokosh's aunt
- Jan Aleksandrowicz-Krasko as Łamignat, Jaga's husband and a nice, lovable thief
- Grzegorz Pawlak as Hegemon, leader of the Knaveknights and the main villain of the series
- Anna Apostolakis as Lubawa, Mirmił's wife
- Jacek Kopczyński as Corporal, Hegemon's right-hand man
- Abelard Giza as Oferma
- Krzysztof Zalewski as Wit, the rhyming knight
- Mateusz Łasowski as Siłacz
- Eryk Lubos as Rodrus, smug warrior
- Maciej Kosmala as Miluś, Kayko and Kokosh's dragon
- Anna Cieślak as Mgiełka (Misty), the kind, young priestess of Porevit
- Monika Brodka as Kaprilda, a spoiled, rich princess
- Olaf Lubaszenko as Ramparam, Kaprilda's devoted father
- Jerzy Stuhr as Old man of the forest, a mythological character who rules over the woods
