= Tildie Soames =

Publication information
- Publisher: Marvel Comics
- First appearance: Astonishing X-Men (vol. 3) #1 (July 2004)
- Created by: Joss Whedon; John Cassaday

In-story information
- Alter ego: Tildie Soames
- Species: Human mutant
- Team affiliations: Benetech
- Abilities: Nightmare manifestation

Tildie Soames is a character appearing in American comic books published by Marvel Comics. She first appeared in Astonishing X-Men Vol. 3 #1 and was created by Joss Whedon and John Cassaday.

Tildie is a mutant with the ability to manifest her nightmares as real, monstrous entities. After inadvertently killing her parents and a police officer, she is used as a test subject for a mutant "cure" and later taken hostage by Ord before she is rescued by the X-Men.

== Publication history ==
Tildie Soames first appeared in Astonishing X-Men vol. 3 #1 (July 2004), and was created by Joss Whedon and John Cassaday.

== Fictional character biography ==
Tildie is a young mutant girl who possesses the ability to manifest her nightmares as tangible creatures. When her abilities first activated, she inadvertently killed both her parents and a police officer who was called in to investigate. Tildie is apprehended and taken to Benetech Labs, where Kavita Rao uses her to develop a mutant cure. Tildie loses her abilities to the cure and stays at the labs with Rao.

One night, Ord of the Breakworld kidnaps Tildie and uses her as a hostage. The X-Men and S.H.I.E.L.D. confront Ord and rescue Tildie, who is returned to Benetech.

== Powers and abilities ==
Tildie possessed the ability to manifest her nightmares as red energy monsters and release powerful blasts of red energy. This additionally gave her immunity to telepathy and limited immunity to other mutants' powers.

== In other media ==
- Tildie Soames appears in Wolverine and the X-Men, voiced by Danielle Judovits. This version is initially a prisoner of the Mutant Response Division before she is freed by Magneto and Juggernaut and taken in by the X-Men so she can master her powers.
- Tildie Soames appears in the Astonishing X-Men motion comic, voiced by Michel Friedman.
