= Chester Commodore =

African-American cartoonist

- Born: Chesterfield Commodore; August 22, 1914 Racine, Wisconsin, U.S.
- Died: April 10, 2004 (aged 89) Colorado Springs, Colorado, U.S.
- Notable works: Editorial cartoons for The Chicago Defender
- Awards: See full list
- Spouses: Marie Ruby Bazel (m. 1930–1954) Mattye Marcia Buchanan Hutchins Nails (m. 1955; died 1990)
- Children: Chesterfield Commodore Jr.: Philip Joseph Commodore

Chester Commodore (August 22, 1914 – April 10, 2004) was an African-American cartoonist who made political cartoons and satirical comic strips. He won numerous awards from 1972 to 1980.

== Early life ==
Born in Racine, Wisconsin, Commodore was a descendant of Peter D. Thomas, a former slave and the first African-American elected official in Wisconsin. His parents and sisters moved to Chicago in 1923, but Chester and his older brother stayed in Racine with his maternal grandmother in her boarding house until he moved to Chicago in 1927. Commodore developed an interest in comics and art at an early age, and was encouraged by his uncle John Prophet. While living with his grandmother, he had the opportunity to meet prominent African-American musicians and entertainers who were turned away from white-owned hotels and restaurants in the Chicago and Milwaukee area.

== Career ==
While studying at Tilden Technical High School, he continued to practice art. After graduation, he worked various odd jobs to support himself, including as a chauffeur and a mechanic, and got a job with the Pullman Company. He was always drawing, and posted his drawings on company bulletin boards. American lawyer and comics writer James Rice was impressed by Commodore's work and recommended him as an artist to the Minneapolis Star in 1938, and the newspaper offered Commodore a job. However, the job offer was rescinded after he arrived, as the staff had been unaware that he was African-American.

In 1948 a national printers' strike led to a job opening at The Chicago Defender, where he excelled despite having no prior experience as a printer. doing layout, but soon started drawing cartoons for the paper. His first strip, in 1948, was called The Sparks. He took over Jay Jackson's strip Bungleton Green in the early 1950s and contributed to the cartoon features The Ravings of Professor Doodle and So What?. When Jay Jackson died in 1954, shortly before the landmark Supreme Court case Brown v. Board of Education, Commodore took over his role drawing editorial cartoons for the paper.

After the assassination of Martin Luther King Jr. in 1968, Commodore began to focus more broadly on the social issues facing the African American community, including poverty, and exclusion from politics. From 1974 he drew a weekly full-page caricature for the cover of the Defender's weekly arts supplement, Accent. The series lasted for more than five years. While working at The Defender, Commodore took artist Marie Antoinette Merriweather under his wing, and she later went on to found her own company, Teddy Bear Graphics.

== Family ==
Commodore was married three times. During the 1930s, he married Marie "Ruby" Bazel, with whom he had two sons; Chesterfield Commodore Jr. and Philip Joseph Commodore. He returned to Chicago in 1940, where he worked as a porter.

In 1955, Commodore married his third wife, Mattye Marcia Buchanan Hutchins Nails, and became stepfather to her daughter Lorin and son William Hutchins. Their marriage lasted until Mattye's death in 1990.

== Later life and death ==
Commodore and his wife retired to Colorado Springs, Colorado in 1981, but in 1992 he resumed work for the Defender, contributing a weekly cartoon until his death in 2004. Commodore also appeared in the 1998 documentary The Black Press: Soldiers Without Swords, directed by Stanley Nelson Jr.

== Legacy ==
Throughout his career, Commodore portrayed African-Americans in a humanizing dignified way, and his work is widely considered to have been a major step away from racial stereotyping of African-Americans, particularly in comics. Commodore's step-daughter Lorin Nails-Smoote donated the Chester Commodore Papers, which included original artwork, letters, photographs and awards to the Chicago Public Library in 2007. The following year, a free public exhibition titled "Chester Commodore, 1914-2004: The Work and Life of a Pioneering Cartoonist of Color" opened at the library.

== Awards and honours ==
Over the course of his career, Commodore won awards for his work as a comic strip artist and editor, and was nominated for a Pulitzer Prize 12 times.

List of awards
Year	Award	Association
1980	Achievement Award	Lu Palmer Foundation
1978	Best Cartoon	National Newspaper Publishers Association
1977	Best Cartoon	National Newspaper Publishers Association
1976	Gold Medallion Award for Cartooning	Cartoonist PROfiles Magazine
1976	Best Cartoon	National Newspaper Publishers Association
1976	Achievement Award	National Conference of Christians and Jews
1975	Best Cartoon	National Newspaper Publishers Association
1974	Best Cartoon	National Newspaper Publishers Association
1973	Achievement Award	Chicago Newspaper Guild
1973	Best Editorial Cartoonist of the Year	Cartoonist PROfiles Magazine
1973	Best Cartoon	National Newspaper Publishers Association
1972	Best Cartoon	National Newspaper Publishers Association

== Exhibitions ==
- "Chester Commodore, 1914-2004: The Work and Life of a Pioneering Cartoonist of Color". Carter G. Woodson Regional Library. 2008.
