= Osiedle Swoboda =

Comic book

Publication information
- Publisher: Niezależna Prasa
- Schedule: Bimonthly
- Genre: Graphic novel, magical realism
- Publication date: 2004–2006
- No. of issues: 6
- Main character(s): Szopa; Wiraż; Niedźwiedź; Smutny

Creative team
- Written by: Michał Śledziński

Osiedle Swoboda (The Liberty Estate) is a Polish comic book written and illustrated by Michał Śledziński. It was supposed to imitate American comic books such as Spider-Man. The first issues appeared in the papers of Produkt magazine and since 2004 it has been published separately by Niezależna Prasa. It consists of 6 issues; the final bimonthly issue was published in 2006. A prototype of "Swoboda" is the estate Szwederowo in Bydgoszcz – the home estate of the author himself. The comic book reflects customs of youth living back in the 1990s, and therefore is considered one of the most important comic books published in Poland.

The abundance of insightful social observations deftly intertwined with the plot contributed to the fame and popularity of the series among young readers: "If I was to mention the most important Polish comic series published at the turn of the 20th and 21st centuries, I would instantly answer that Osiedle Swoboda has no equals" was how the series was described in Gazeta Wyborcza by Wojciech Orliński.

== Plot ==
It presents adventures of young people living in the casual estate. The characters (Smutny, Wiraż, Niedzwiedź, Szopa, Kundzio) like rough music, parties, alcohol and other substances. They are constantly forced to wrestle with violence, boredom, dull hoods and hangovers – everything that today's youth is exposed to.

== The main characters ==
=== Smutny ===
Name and surname: unknown

Nickname: Smutny

Education: unknown

Occupation: lack of a permanent job; occasionally: a morgue employee, a stretcher-bearer, Santa Claus

Family: parents, brother, aunt

Description: a victim of various unfortunate twists of fate. He displays a tendency to meet psychos in the estate. Together with Kundzio, he rents a double room hole in the old part of Swoboda. Some readers claim he might be perceived as a personification of the author, however such statements have always been denied by Michał Śledziński.

Distinguishing marks: goatsbeard, a sad facial expression

The most famous feat: relieving himself of breakfast in a church

=== Szopa ===
Name and surname: unknown

Nickname: Szopa

Education: unknown

Occupation: a drug dealer, occasionally: Santa Claus

Family: grandmother and cousin Adrian (both dead), mother

Description: a drug pusher with some moral rules. No chemicals, kids, and pregnant women. He is always seen with a cigarette and presents himself as perfectly composed and reticent kind of person. He carries on his business from a dugout in the outskirts of the city- the place where he decided to stay after his friend had disappeared. He takes care of Ciacho's bitch called Psotka. He had earlier lived in a tenement haunted by ghosts.

Distinguishing marks: afro, beard

The most famous feat: breaking a rubber plant without using hands

=== Wiraż ===
Name and surname: unknown

Nickname: Wiraż

Education: unknown

Occupation: lack of a permanent job, occasionally: elf

Family: sister

Description: he is thought to be the greatest freak in the crew. He has ambition to become a master of ceremonies and is interested in building his career on the stage. He is a figure of fun and is constantly laughed at by other characters, especially Niedźwiedź. He is recognizable by a hat inherited from his grandfather.

Distinguishing marks: a checked hat, a huge nose

The most famous feat: destroying the door in Szopa's apartment

=== Niedźwiedź ===
Name and surname: unknown

Nickname: Niedźwiedź

Education: Railway High School

Occupation: lack of a permanent job, occasionally: a morgue employee, a stretcher-bearer, Santa Claus, a member of a demolition team, a leaflet hander

Family: unknown

Description: the greatest boozer in the estate. It seems that inebriation is his natural state. He is perpetually penniless and implicates Smutny in some abstract, ungainful shoddy work. A willingness to fight, straightforwardness and being rude to women are his characteristic features. He used to be a member of a heavy metal demolition team called "Destroyers".

Distinguishing marks: a winter cap, beard, his nose and ear are pierced

The most famous feat: leading to a brawl between two groups of an athletic-disco disposition

=== Kundzio ===
Name and surname: unknown

Nickname: Kundzio

Education: unknown

Occupation: unknown

Family: unknown

Description: an enthusiast of ladies who had studied their psyche for a year reading women's magazines and analyzing individual episodes of soap operas. Other character of the series, Ciachciarachciach, believes in his telekinetic powers. He is one among a few who are able to see a creature called a "man in stripes" - Ciachciarachciach's messenger.

Distinguishing marks: none

The most famous feat: remaining the only sober person after a party at Fizyk's hang-out

=== Ciachciarachciach ===
Name and surname: unknown

Nickname: Ciachciarachciach (an urban legend)

Education: unknown

Occupation: unknown

Family: a dog called Psotka

Description: he seems to be a regular guy but is thought to be a protector of the estate. He is alleged to have some supernatural powers and helps the crew with all crises. He disappeared after a tenement haunted by ghost had been torn down. He stayed together with his bitch Psotka in a dogout in the outskirts of the city.

Distinguishing marks: hairy, unshaven

The most famous feat: emptying a bottle of wine in 17 seconds

== Important motifs ==
=== Legends on the block ===
Stories are an inextricable part of living in the estate and are shared by characters of Osiedle Swobda all the time. Therefore, telling them grows into the local art, the best raconteur – like the ones in tribes – is an extremely important member of "tribal" hierarchy. On the other hand, one could not help but notice that tales embellish characters' lives. Although, they seem to embark on their own adventures the longing for something more is still detectable. These urban legends are often produced under the influence of alcohol and so called "magical element". Through colorful stories characters escape from the grey reality but in time this escape becomes their entire live. What is left after sobering up are depressing hangover and disappointed parents who possess no authority and are constantly absent.

=== Wisdom of the block ===
Characters in Osiedle Swoboda evince anti-intellectualism combined with anecdotal and philosophical wisdom – the folk one. They are presented as sages who do not need academic knowledge to be sharp-witted and street smart. Faith in the superiority of knowledge acquired on the street is almost a utopian belief compared by some critics to excessive idealization of Polish peasantry in Little Poland. The block in the series is presented in terms of the myth of dualism – on one hand it is paradise, on the other, ghetto with no way out.

== Legacy ==
Polish comic books have developed dramatically since the first issue of Osiedle Swoboda was published. It then distinguished itself by an original way of combining the local with the global. Osiedle Swoboda is a typical housing estate originating from an authentic Polish estate in Bydgoszcz. However, in the background one may distinguish motifs taken ironically from a "kit" of stereotypes of global mass culture. Characters are chased by avengers in masks, some of them experience some paranormal adventures. Today this formula has stopped being a novelty. Osiedle Swoboda no longer stands out as an innovative project, simply because there is a plethora of comic books with similar subject matter (e.g. Wilq - superbohater). All in all, this comic book stood the test of time exceptionally well. What still amazes readers is the author's description of ordinary people living in the casual estate enriched with a measure of unusual humour. Additionally, the series is spiced with a pinch of surrealism and fantasy which seem almost inherent in this particular estate. So far no one has managed to illustrate Polish young people and their lives in a more convincing way.
