= Lily Lau Lee Lee =

Hong Kong cartoonist

- Born: 28 December 1966

Lily Lau Lee Lee (Chinese: 劉莉莉; born December 28, 1966) is a Hong Kong cartoonist. She has been described as "the first self-proclaimed feminist manhua artist in Hong Kong".

== Personal life ==
Lily Lau Lee Lee was born on December 28, 1966. Lau said "As a Chinese woman, and the youngest girl in my family, I was told that there were many limitations on what I could achieve. My parents did not have very high expectations and told me that I did not have to work very hard...I was told by my teacher that I should pursue my studies in the arts, but I did not have the resources to do so....It took me nearly 20 years to recognise my own abilities." Lau graduated with a degree in Graphic Design at the Hong Kong Polytechnic University in 1990. Lau also graduated with a master's degree from the University of Leeds.

== Career ==
She became involved in activist causes, including becoming a chairperson of Hong Kong's Association for the Advancement of Feminism, which spoke out about sexist imagery in television advertisements and hosted a mock awards night for the most sexist ads. She turned from feminist essays to cartoons when asked by an academic to produce cartoons for a gender and sexuality journal. Lau said "People in Hong Kong don't like reading more than 1,000 words. So if you want them to see your work, you do comics."

In 1998, Lau began drawing the comic strip Lily's Comix, which appeared initially in Hong Kong Film Weekly and later in mainstream newspapers like in the Hong Kong Economic Journal, The Sun, and Apple Daily. The strip was controversial and noted for its "graphic nudity and sexual frankness". She went on to draw other strips for newspapers, including Beginning of the End in Hong Kong and St. John's Warts in Taiwan.

In 1998, she also publisher her first book of comics, 媽媽的抽屜在最低 - 性,性别,性别政治 (Mom’s Drawer At the Bottom - Sex, Gender, Gender Politics). It quickly sold most of its initial 1000 copy print run and was later published in a bilingual Chinese-English version. Lau directly labels her work as feminist and Wendy Siuyi Wong and Lisa Cuklan note that "Lau deliberately engages gender politics and ideology, often by using simple observation rather than polemical argument."

She has also published This Is How Stars Should Really Be (1999), an anti-racist Chinese and English language comic book, and The Beginning of the End (2001). In 2001, she contributed the title story to the international comics collection Letter to a Dead Friend, a product of an art exhibition at the 2000 Fumetto International Comics Festival.
