= Kavita Rao =

Dr. Kavita Rao

Publication information
- Publisher: Marvel Comics
- First appearance: Astonishing X-Men (vol. 3) #1 (July 2004)
- Created by: Joss Whedon (writer); John Cassaday (artist)

In-story information
- Team affiliations: X-Club; Benetech
- Notable aliases: Vita
- Abilities: Genius-level intellect, Master geneticist

Dr. Kavita "Vita" Rao is a fictional character appearing in American comic books published by Marvel Comics, commonly in association with the X-Men. Kavita Rao first appeared in Astonishing X-Men (vol. 3) #1 (July 2004), and was created by Joss Whedon and John Cassaday. She is an accomplished human geneticist who developed a "cure" for mutants. She later assists the X-Men as a resident scientist in the X-Club, becoming a major human ally of mutants.

Shohreh Aghdashloo portrays Rao in X-Men: The Last Stand.

== Publication history ==
Kavita Rao first appeared in Astonishing X-Men (vol. 3) #1 (July 2004), and was created by Joss Whedon and John Cassaday.

== Fictional character biography ==
=== Hope ===
Kavita Rao is a world-renowned geneticist from India who developed a serum (later called "Hope") to "cure" mutants, removing their powers. Rao justifies her research as curing mutants with detrimental or harmful powers, such as Tildie Soames (a child whose nightmares manifest as monsters).

Hundreds of mutants sign up for the procedure at Benetech, Rao's corporate backer. The X-Men debate the merits of the cure and the significance of labeling the mutant condition a disease. The chance at shedding his "beastly" appearance and avoiding any further secondary mutations is appealing to Hank McCoy, who considers taking the serum. Wolverine destroys Rao's work, leaving McCoy with the last sample of Hope.

=== Endangered Species ===
Rao is among the individuals to whom Beast offers to 'sell his soul' for a means to undo the effects of M-Day, when the Scarlet Witch removed the powers of most mutants on Earth. When Beast proposes they go back in time to obtain the DNA sample of the parents of a mutant, Rao questions why they must all go when Beast says it is one of the perks of the job. She travels back with the rest of the X-Club and Psylocke to the year 1906.

=== Second Coming ===
When Cable and Hope Summers return to the present, Bastion begins to set his plan in motion in exterminating the mutant race. Thanks to the New Mutants, they discover he has erected towers in certain points around San Francisco. Cyclops sends the X-Club to investigate. Upon arriving on one of his oil platforms where one of these towers is located, they come across a timer which goes off. When the timer hits zero, the group is transported to a dystopian future. They meet a now human Hank McCoy, who warns them to keep Rao safe at all costs. Hank reveals that Hope's powers grew out of control and he needs Rao to recreate her Hope serum to change the past. After some convincing, Rao reveals she kept an encrypted copy of the formula on her Mala bracelet and they go to Utopia to take out Hope. However, it is revealed that the dystopian future is a lie created by Graydon Creed using holographic technology. Rao reveals that she knew of the deception and created an unstable pyrovirus to destroy the oil platform.

=== Curse of the Mutants ===
Following the events of Second Coming, Rao is seen with Doctor Nemesis checking on Jubilee after she becomes a vampire. While the rest of the X-Men meet to discuss the vampire problem, Rao goes to check on Jubilee, but is knocked unconscious.

She chaperoned the young mutants of Utopia to the Avengers Compound during the Avengers vs X-Men event. After the dissolution of Utopia and the X-Club, Rao became a staff member of the Jean Grey School for Higher Learning.

== Other versions ==
In the "Age of X" reality, Kavita Rao is branded as a traitor to humanity for allying with the mutants, helping Wolverine eliminate an anti-mutant toxin.

== In other media ==
- Dr. Kavita Rao appears in the Astonishing X-Men motion comic, voiced by Eva Kaminsky.
- Dr. Kavita Rao appears in the Wolverine and the X-Men episode "Battle Lines", voiced by Susan Dalian.
- Dr. Kavita Rao appears in X-Men: The Last Stand, portrayed by Shohreh Aghdashloo. However, due to the film's script being incomplete when she joined, Aghdashloo initially stated that her character was Cecilia Reyes. This version is an employee of Worthington Labs who is later killed by Quill.
