= Michał Śledziński =

Polish comic book author (born 1978)

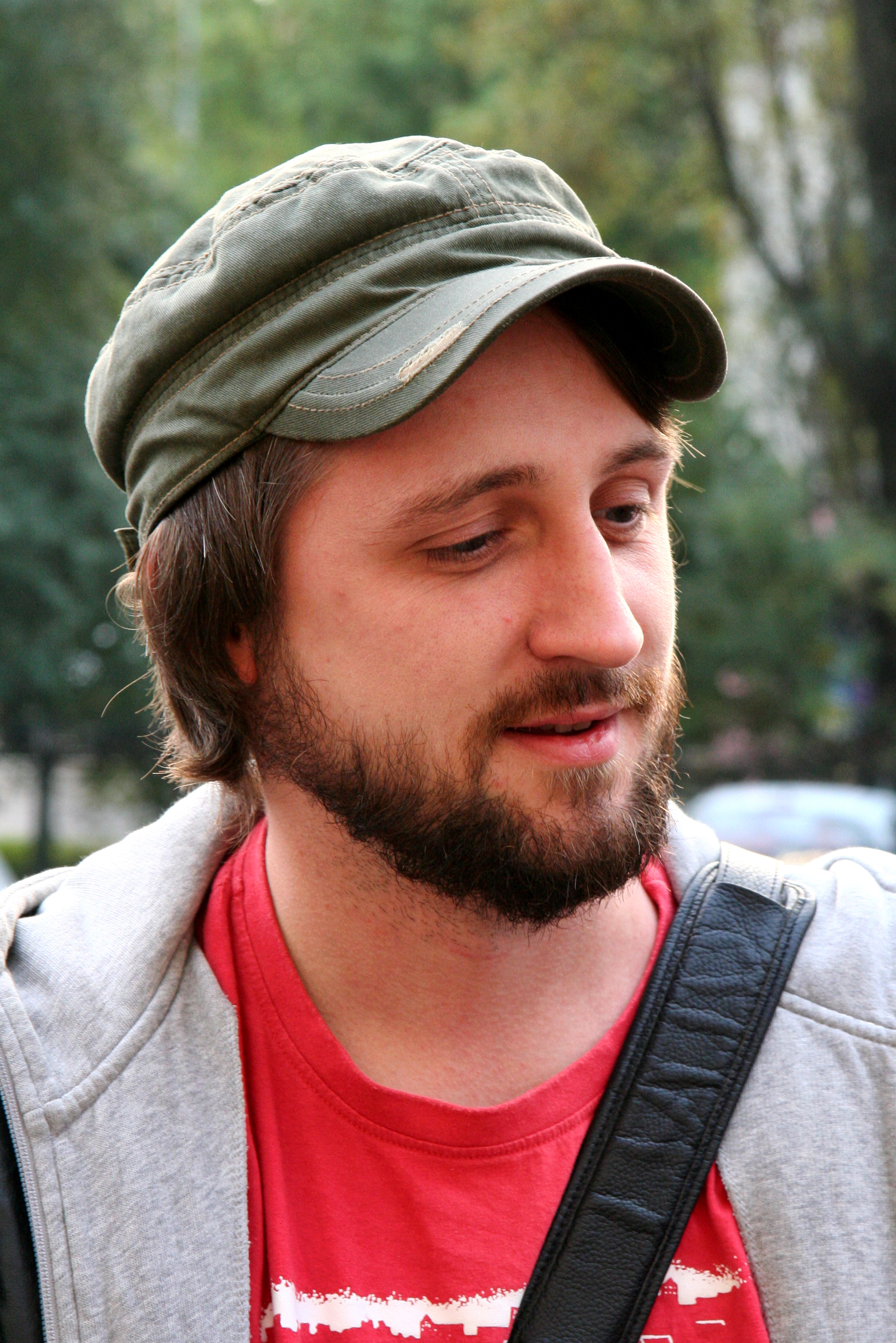
- Śledziński in 2010
- Born: 31 July 1978 (age 48) Bydgoszcz, Poland
- Areas: Cartoonist, Writer, Penciller, Artist, Inker, Letterer, Colourist
- Pseudonym: Śledziu
- Notable works: The Liberty Estate, Red Penguin Must Die!

Michał "Śledziu" Śledziński (born 31 July 1978 in Bydgoszcz, Poland) is a Polish cartoonist, comic book artist and writer, storyboard artist and animation director.

He is known as the author of such comics as The Liberty Estate and Red Penguin Must Die!. He was the editor-in-chief and co-creator of comic magazines Produkt and P-Lux, as well as co-author of several comic anthologies.

He also served as director and storyboard artist on the animated series Kayko and Kokosh as well as director, writer and artist on the video game Warsaw.
