= John Sampson (character) =

- Alex Cross (novel series) character
- First appearance: Along Came A Spider
- Created by: James Patterson
- Portrayed by: Bill Nunn; Isaiah Mustafa

In-universe information
- Nicknames: 'Big' John (due to his height of 6ft 9); Sampson; Sugar
- Species: Human
- Gender: Male
- Occupation: Police detective
- Spouse: Bille
- Religion: Christian
- Nationality: American

John Sampson is a fictional character in James Patterson's Alex Cross series of novels and is one of the main characters.

== Character information ==
=== Character background ===
John A. Sampson met African-American Alex Cross and at the age of ten they became best friends. Sampson's parents were both absent during his childhood – his father was in prison; his mother was convicted of possession of heroin with intent to sell. He was raised by Alex's grandmother Nana Mama, which influenced his move to Washington, D.C. in the books. They are described as having much fun, stealing, etc. during their childhood in some of the books, which would annoy Nana Mama who would in turn lecture or ground Cross. After graduating from high school, he enlisted in the United States Army for four years of duty. He had a tour in Vietnam and made friends with his drill sergeant who was later killed in Four Blind Mice and goes looking for the killer along with Alex Cross, who became a Washington police officer. When returning to D.C., he also works for the Metropolitan Police Department with Cross, until Alex joins the FBI.

=== Character overview ===
Sampson joins the Metropolitan Police Department as a detective along with Cross, eventually becoming partners. Sampson first appears in the book Along Came a Spider in which he and Cross go on the case to solve a kidnapping of famous actress' daughter. He appears in 19 of the 20 books in the series. He briefly appears in Kiss the Girls (2nd book). He also helps Cross in Jack & Jill when murders are committed near Cross' son Damon's elementary school, Truth. In Pop Goes the Weasel he reveals to Cross that he had been in love with Nina Childs, an African-American nurse, who is killed early in the book, thus he vows to get vengeance. Cross later finds the killer, Geoffrey Shafer, and arrests him. However, Shafer, in court, wins and the case is closed, therefore letting him get the chance to kill his own wife and escaping Cross. He returns in London Bridges (novel) and is killed by Cross, avenging Nina's death for Sampson.

In the earlier books he appears in smaller roles, but gains a larger role throughout the series. In Cross he plays a prominent role helping Cross capture Michael Sullivan "The Butcher" who may have killed Alex's wife, Maria, years ago. In the end, Sullivan is killed by Alex and Sampson reveals he had killed Maria's murderer, Jimmy Hats Galati (a friend of Sullivan's) long ago, but couldn't find it in himself to tell this to Cross. In Double Cross he helps Cross and his new love interest, Brianna "Bree" Stone, but at the end is kidnapped. Cross rescues his partner, and with the help of Bree kills and stops the killers known as DCAK. In the books, the main antagonist (for coming out more in the books) is Gary Soneji or Kyle Craig "The Mastermind". Kyle Craig is a friend of Cross and Sampson in the beginning of the series, but in Roses Are Red he is a murderer known as the Mastermind. It is not until the end of Violets Are Blue that he is arrested by Cross himself.

In the novel, Four Blind Mice, John meets a woman named Billie, whose husband was framed for murder and killed by lethal injection. While investigating her, John ends up falling in love with her, while at the same time not knowing it. Even after he gets what he needs from her, John keeps seeing her again. After a few dozen times, John and Billie finally admit their love for each other and decide to start a relationship. John, who has never had sex with any woman before (which is less likely due to earlier suggestions from the previous novels), sleeps with Billie and finds himself at peace for the very first time with her. He proposes to her and the two get married at the end of the book. In London Bridges, John reveals that Billie is pregnant and that he is going to be a father, which excites him. Billie and his daughter make several appearances throughout the series.

Sampson continues to support Alex in I, Alex Cross, where Nana Mama has a heart attack. He is considered family by Cross and his family. Cross Country shows him helping Alex and Bree in a murder committed by children under the supervision of a killer known as the "Tiger". In Cross Fire he continues to be Cross' best friend, partner, helper, sidekick, and more. He is also Cross' best man when Cross remarries after the death of his wife, Maria Cross.

== Appearances in series ==
Note: Sampson has appeared in 21 of the 32 books of the series so far and 2 out of 3 of the Cross films. He is also a co-lead character in at least one of the books (Cross Down).

- Along Came a Spider
- Kiss the Girls
- Jack & Jill
- Cat and Mouse
- Pop Goes the Weasel
- Roses Are Red
- Violets Are Blue
- Four Blind Mice
- The Big Bad Wolf
- London Bridges
- Mary, Mary
- Cross
- Double Cross
- Cross Country
- I, Alex Cross
- Cross Fire
- Kill Alex Cross
- Merry Christmas, Alex Cross
- Alex Cross, Run
- Cross My Heart
- Hope to Die
- Cross Justice
- Cross Kill
- The People vs. Alex Cross
- Cross Down
- Return of the Spider

== Love interests ==
Throughout the books, it is explained Sampson has had many girlfriends, but has not been able to marry anyone for a few reasons.

- In the book, Pop Goes the Weasel, he tells Alex he had fallen in love with the newly deceased Nina Childs, before she had died. Her death causes him great pain and he vows vengeance against the one who killed her. The killer is revealed to be Geoffrey Shafer, who manages to escape at the end of the novel. By London Bridges, Shafer resurfaces and is killed by Alex, avenging Nina's death for John, similar to what John did for Alex in the novel Cross.
- In Four Blind Mice, he goes to New Jersey to investigate a woman named Billie, whose husband had previously died. After, what initially was interrogating her, they become friends. After some time, in the book they start dating and share a romantic night together. Sampson mentions that he has never had sex with woman before, despite that the past novels say otherwise, and finally gives in with Billie. At the end of the book, Sampson proposes to Billie and the two get married. In London Bridges John reveals to Alex that Billie is pregnant and that he is going to be a father. Billie is once again featured in most of the books afterwards, or is mentioned. Billie reappears with John in Merry Christmas Alex Cross, while on a double date with Alex and Bree. John was initially reluctant to even get close to Billie because his parents had not been the best of parents – his father left him; his mom went to jail. Due to this, he did not want to have kids in fear the same that happened to him would happen to his children. He eventually overcomes this fear and allows himself to fall deeply in love with Billie, marry her, and also have a child with her. It is said that Sampson is finally at peace because of her and his new daughter.
- In the film Alex Cross, he appears as a main character by the name of Tommy Kane living in Detroit. In the film, he is revealed to be dating a fellow partner, Detective Monica Ashe. After Alex figures out that he has been having sex with her, they both argue over the rules of having a relationship like that on the job, as it is dangerous to be emotionally compromised. After Monica attempts to help them, she is apprehended by the film's villain, Picasso, who apparently kills her. Cross and Kane go after a chemist in order to find the killer, where it is revealed that Monica died from her injuries. Her death causes Tom to seek vengeance, along with Alex, whose wife was also killed by the same villain. They manage to stop Picasso from escaping, but Tom is injured in the attempt, forcing Alex to face off against him. By the end of the movie, Alex kills Picasso by making him fall to his death, avenging both his wife's and Monica's deaths.

In the book the film was adapted from – Cross – Monica Ashe doesn't appear or even exist in the novel. Also, Tom's character is actually named John Sampson in the novel series and is already married to his wife, Billie, by the events of Cross.

== Adaptations ==
- Sampson briefly appeared played by Bill Nunn in the first Alex Cross film ever made – Kiss the Girls. In the movie, John is the one who tells Alex (Morgan Freeman) of Naomi's disappearance and is seen helping Alex comfort his family. While he tries to tell Alex to leave Naomi's disappearance to the police in North Carolina, Alex declines and decides to go investigate. Later on, Alex and Sampson team up in Los Angeles, doing a unofficial police stakeout on a suspect named Dr. Rudolph, along with the help of Kate McTiernan and fellow detective, Henry Castillo. They manage to catch Rudolph in the act of raping a young girl and move in to capture him. However, Rudolph escapes and kills Henry, also injuring Alex along the way as well. In order to make sure that Alex and Kate are safe, John takes full responsibility for the incident and is blamed by the authorities for what happened. While he doesn't make any more appearances, his sacrifice is not in vain as Alex manages to catch Rudolph and the real Casanova, also rescuing Naomi and many other captive girls too. In this movie, John Sampson's introduction and appearance is more faithful to the book and series. It is also the only movie that John Sampson is seen in.
- In the 2012 film Alex Cross, he was portrayed by actor Edward Burns and had a substantial larger role than in Kiss the Girls. However, Sampson's name in the film was changed to "Tommy Kane". Another notable difference is that the Alex Cross movie takes place in Detroit, not Washington, D.C., and Kane (Sampson) does not kill Maria Cross' killer, and Michael Sullivan "the Butcher" is actually Maria's murderer.

In the film, Kane and Alex (Tyler Perry) are partners (just like in the novels), along with a new trainee named Monica Ashe. In the film, both Kane and Monica have a relationship, sexually in nature. After Alex discovers the affair, he and Tom talk about how having a relationship like that while being partners is dangerous and Alex gives him the ultimatum to either end the relationship or one of them walks from the unit. Tom later learns that Alex is taking a job with the FBI, due to his wife being pregnant with their third child. While he happy for news of their new baby, Tom also is sadden to the fact that Alex will be moving to Washington D.C., which will force them to go their separate ways. Alex and Tom investigate a recent murder, who they name "Picasso". After facing off against Picasso and saving his next victim, the killer targets Tom, Alex and Monica for standing up to him. Monica and Alex's wife, Maria, are killed by Picasso, causing them both to go after him for revenge. They manage to find him by using video cameras to discover his licenses plate number and crash into his car as he tries to escape. With Tom injured, Alex goes after Picasso alone and kills him by making him fall to his death, avenging both his wife and Kane's girlfriend. Just as Alex was about to suffer the same fate as Picasso, Kane shows up at the last minute and saves him. After they manage to frame Picasso's employer Giles Mercier, who escaped to Indonesia, by having cocaine put in his house, which he is condemned by firing squad. Having fully avenged Monica's death, Kane decides to join the FBI, so that he could remain close to Alex and maybe work with him again someday. A sequel based on Double Cross is currently in the works. A deal is being finalized by Perry and Patterson. So far it is unconfirmed whether or not if Burns will return to play Kane again, however, Perry has been confirmed to reprise his role as Cross. Sampson's "new" name – Tommy Kane – probably reflects an original character that takes character traits and inspiration from Sampson. This has not been confirmed.

- Isiah Mustafa portrayed Sampson in the Prime Video series Cross.
