= Kyle Craig =

Fictional character in James Patterson's books

Kyle Craig is a fictional character and antagonist in James Patterson's series of novels featuring Washington, D.C. detective Alex Cross. Craig is introduced in the first novel in the series, Along Came a Spider (1993).

Craig, a Special Agent for the Federal Bureau of Investigation, is initially a close friend of Cross and assists the detective in his high-profile investigations, and also occasionally asks Cross for help with his own cases. However, the end of the 2000 novel Roses Are Red reveals Craig to be a criminal who calls himself "The Mastermind", having organized a series of brutal bank robberies and murders. He is eventually brought to justice by Cross. From Violets Are Blue onwards, Craig is one of Cross' most formidable adversaries. In Double Cross (2007), Craig has escaped from a maximum-security prison in Colorado.

In the film adaptations of Patterson's novels Kiss the Girls and Along Came a Spider, Craig is played by Jay O. Sanders. In the TV series Cross, a female version of the character, named Kayla Craig, is played by Alona Tal.

== Character background and history ==
Serial killer Kyle Craig was raised in rural Charlotte, North Carolina to a general, who abused him emotionally and physically at a young age and later – a claim which is denied by both his older brother and mother who state Kyle liked to "make stuff up". His elder brother once said that he became such a mean kid that they kicked him out of the house to live in the garage a couple of times. Kyle's brother also states that Kyle was something of a bully in school, had no friends at all and underachieved in contrast to his brothers. Later on in his life, it was said that Kyle killed one of his two brothers while hunting. His second brother knew about it and even punched Kyle at their brother's funeral. When the time came, Craig moved away from family and didn't see his mother, father, or surviving brother again. His father was revealed to have died sometime during the series. Kyle graduated from Duke University and Duke's Law School, as indicated in Double Cross, and was in the US Special Forces before he became a rising star in the FBI. It is revealed that while at Duke University, he had met two killers Casanova and The Gentleman Caller, who later become the villains in Kiss the Girls, and started killing along with them before heading off on his own. Some time during his life, his met his unknown wife, married her and had a couple of children. While in the FBI, Craig started looking across the United States for other known killers, two of whom were the Audience Killer and the Wolf, two villains who later appear in other novels as villains to Alex Cross. It is also believed that he had also met another killer named Mr. Smith, who would also face off against Cross in Cat & Mouse. During the events of Kiss the Girls, Craig killed a reporter named Beth Lieberman, marking his first seen kill in the novels, although he has killed before.

Kyle first appears as an FBI agent in Along Came a Spider continuing to Violets Are Blue He becomes a friend of Alex Cross, the series protagonist, helping him out on his cases to capture killers, even using his FBI connections to give him resources. By the novel Roses Are Red, a new serial killer called the "Mastermind" is causing trouble with a series of bank robberies and murders, including that of Alex's girlfriend and partner, FBI agent Betsey Cavalierre. By the end of the novel, it is revealed that Kyle Craig himself is the serial killer, but no one knows the truth. In Violets Are Blue, Craig, as the Mastermind, continues to taunt Alex and later reveals himself at the end of the novel. When he tries to kill Alex, he is defeated and arrested by Alex himself. During his interrogation, Craig reveals that he killed multiple times before during the book series and that he killed Betsy because she was onto him and that her love for Alex was growing stronger and coming between him and Alex. After his trial, Craig is sent to prison. From books Four Blind Mice to Double Cross, Craig is held at the supermax prison, ADX Florence. He is visited by Cross only when he has information on certain cases. It is also revealed in Cross Fire he has ASPD (antisocial personality disorder) and boasts an IQ of 149.

Four years later, in Double Cross, Kyle escapes prison with the help of his lawyer and travels across the Eastern United States and to Paris, enjoying his newfound freedom. He kills multiple people during the novel, one of whom is his mother, who he kills out of spite as she denies having any knowledge of the abuse her son suffered at the hands of her husband William. He also uses his mother's bank account to wire money into an overseas account in order to support himself and assist in remaining hidden. After facing off against Alex, with the help of the Audience Killer, Craig once again escapes and goes into hiding, planning his revenge against Cross. In both novels Cross Country and I, Alex Cross, Craig calls towards the end of the books and leaves a threatening message and his plan for revenge against Alex. In Cross Fire, Craig returns and has plastic surgery to change his face in order to get close to Cross. While pretending to be another FBI agent named Max Siegel, he takes on cases that Alex is working and starts to gain his trust in a case against two killers. After solving the case and attending Alex's wedding, Craig reveals himself to Alex on his honeymoon and they fight. Alex wounds and is about to capture him when Craig, unable to escape and not wanting to go back to prison, kills himself by shooting a gas tank. He appears as the villain in more books than any other in the Alex Cross series.

In the earlier books, it was mentioned that Kyle was married with a couple of children, but his wife and children are never mentioned or seen in the later books. It is presumed that they have cut Kyle out of their lives because he is a killer.

He does not appear in London Bridges, Mary, Mary, Cross, Alex Cross's Trial, and all the novels set after his death in Cross Fire.

== Character relationships and enemies ==
Throughout the series, Kyle Craig had a seemingly strong friendship with Alex Cross. Kyle would help Alex out on several of his cases, giving him the resources and clearance to take care of the job. He also helped give him clearance to see Gary Soneji in Along Came A Spider. In the novel Kiss the Girls, Kyle kept Alex on the case to find his niece, Naomi, who was kidnapped by Casanova. Even off the case, the two had a strong friendship and would go out for a beer once in a while. Alex once consider Kyle to be one of his best and loyal friends in the FBI. However, when Kyle was revealed to be the "Mastermind", a serial killer who was behind a series of bank robberies, including the murder of Alex's girlfriend, FBI agent Betsey Cavalierre, all of which happened in Roses Are Red and Violets Are Blue. The revelation put a strain on Alex's relationship with Kyle, and made them enemies to each other, with both of them wanting to kill each other. Alex later captured and imprisoned Kyle for his crimes, which would set Kyle off to vow vengeance. After escaping prison in Double Cross, Kyle would face off against Alex for the final time in Cross Fire, with Kyle dying by the climax of the novel.

In Kiss the Girls, Kyle met Kate McTiernan for the first time and would later form a crush on her in Violets Are Blue, despite the fact that she was engaged by that time. Both Kyle and Kate seemed to have a good friendship and meet up for lunch, along with Alex, once in a while. When it was revealed that Kyle was the killer known as the "Mastermind", Kate was shocked by the information and was revealed to be his next victim. After Kyle is captured and sent to prison, it is presumed that Kate has cut all ties from Kyle and moved on with her life.

Kyle also seemed to have a small friendship with John Sampson, Alex's childhood friend and partner. However, by the time Kyle is revealed to be the killer, John seemed to have come to view him as an enemy and whatever friendship existed between them faded away.

Kyle's relationship with his family wasn't very good to begin with and there was never any reconcile with any of them. It is believed that Mr. Craig, Kyle's father, abused him and that his mother did nothing to stop it. He also had two brothers, one of which he presumably kills and strains the relationship with the other for good. When Kyle is revealed to be a killer and sent to prison, his family shows no sympathy for him. During his imprisonment, Kyle's father dies. Kyle later kills his own mother and steals her money from her bank account after he escapes prison. After Kyle's death, his other brother is his only surviving family member left.

Sometime during Kyle's life, he met and married Louise, and had two children, Bradley and Virginia. After Kyle's imprisonment, his wife and children are never mentioned or heard from again. It is left presumed that his wife and children had cut him off and moved on with their lives.

Although it is never shown, Kyle, as the "Mastermind", viewed Alex's current girlfriend in Roses Are Red, FBI agent Betsy Cavalierre, to be a great enemy to his relationship and future rivalry with Alex. When Betsy started to investigate Kyle, under the suspicion that he may be the one behind the murders, Kyle kills her, stabbing her multiple times inside her own home.

== Storylines ==
=== Along Came a Spider ===
Kyle Craig makes several brief appearances in the novel, as a rising star in the FBI. He helps Alex Cross, John Sampson, and several other detectives search for Gary Soneji, to which they finally capture him at a McDonald's. He later becomes friends with Alex and starts giving him help through his FBI status.

=== Kiss the Girls ===
Kyle Craig returns for a much bigger role in the second novel, he helps lead an investigation against a serial killer and kidnapper, Casanova. He provides resources for Alex, which helps lead to another serial killer by the name of The Gentleman Caller, who stalks people on the Western Coast of California. At the end of the novel, both killers are linked together and are killed by Alex, and all kidnapped women are freed, finally ending the case.

During the book, it is hinted that Kyle may have murdered a reporter named Beth Lieberman, who was researching the Gentleman Caller. This is later confirmed in Violets Are Blue.

=== Jack & Jill ===
Kyle Craig's role is small in the novel, but he does make a few appearances throughout the book.

=== Cat & Mouse ===
Kyle is investigating a serial killer named Mr. Smith, who has been killing throughout the Eastern United States and Western Europe. He tries to get Alex on the case but fails to convince him. After Alex and his family are brutally attacked inside their home, Craig and the FBI use the incident as an advantage to lure out Mr. Smith, who is revealed to be none other than Thomas Pierce, an FBI agent who has been on the Mr. Smith case since the beginning. Kyle later tries to have Pierce killed, based on a kill order from the FBI, during ambush. Pierce/Smith is able to escape but is finally killed by John Sampson.

=== Pop Goes the Weasel ===
Kyle's role is once again small, but he does appear a few times and even helps Alex try to find his fiancée, Christine Johnson, who was kidnapped by a serial killer named Geoffrey Shafer.

=== Roses Are Red ===
At the beginning of the 2000 novel Roses Are Red, Craig, using the alias "The Mastermind", formulates the robbery of a Citibank with two associates, Errol and Brianne Parker. Over the course of the robbery, Brianne reveals that Errol is holding the bank manager's family hostage and will kill them all if she doesn't leave the bank by a certain time. The robbery goes as planned, but Brianne neglects to call Errol, who in turn kills the family anyway. Craig, as the Mastermind, later visits the Parkers at their secluded hideout, bringing pizza and wine to celebrate. However, the poisoned items kill the Parkers. It is stated later that Brianne was raped by Craig post-mortem. Cross, investigating the robbery, finds the Parkers' bodies and informs Craig, unaware of his role in murdering them.

Craig hires a more professional robbery crew, who are referred to only by codenames: Mr. Red, Mr. White, Mr. Blue, and Mrs. Green. This new crew robs a First Union bank and, same as before, holds the manager's family hostage, only this time Mr. Red and Mr. White produce a videotape to prove they are not bluffing. When he hears an alert on a police scanner regarding the robbery, Mr. Blue kills the bank's staff; the First Union manager's family is later released. It is later revealed that Craig had intended for the staff to be killed no matter what the robbery's outcome was, and that it was he who tipped off the police. After two more robberies—which Craig investigates alongside Cross—he murders the crew with more poisoned food, this time having sex with Mrs. Green's corpse.

Craig hires five corrupt NYPD narcotics detectives to take part in his next crime, in which they commandeer a Washington tour bus carrying the wives of several insurance executives and demand a ransom of $5 million in uncut diamonds; the transfer is a success and the hostages are released. The FBI suspects a former U.S. Army sergeant, Mitchell Brand, of organizing the robberies and eventually track down his location. However, it turns out Brand was set up. Meanwhile, Craig commits two home invasions, in one case raping and killing a woman for the initial purpose of impregnating her. Cross' investigation next focuses on Frederick Szabo, the head of security at the First Union, and then on Szabo's therapist, Dr. Bernard Francis. Despite being implicated by an accomplice, Francis professes his innocence whilst dying from poison.

Three weeks after the case is seemingly solved, Craig contacts Cross and tells him that Betsy Cavalierre, the FBI special agent assisting him on the Mastermind case, has been raped, murdered, and mutilated in her own home. Cross, who was romantically involved with Cavalierre, swears to kill the Mastermind—unaware that Craig is listening and secretly ecstatic over the emotional turmoil he has caused.

=== Violets Are Blue ===
In the wake of Cavalierre's murder, Craig engages in a covert cat-and-mouse game with Cross, threatening his family and friends as the Mastermind. While this is going on, he also assists Cross in his investigation of a series of vampiric serial killings in San Francisco. Over the course of the investigation, they realize that the murders are the work of a cult and track similar killings across the country. When Cross returns to Washington, Craig enters his house and prepares to kill both him and his family. However, because Cross is recovering from injuries inflicted by a suspect, Craig does not consider him a worthy opponent at the moment and leaves.

After Cross links the killings to Daniel and Charles, a pair of travelling magicians, he and Craig travel to New Orleans to put them under surveillance. As the investigation progresses, Craig becomes increasingly hostile to Jamilla Hughes, an SFPD detective aiding Cross; Hughes considers Craig to be a control freak who has serious issues with women. After Daniel and Charles are mysteriously killed during a Halloween party, Cross receives another taunting call from the Mastermind; this time, he notices Craig watching him intently.

Cross comes to believe that while Daniel and Charles were involved in the killings, they had been framed for the more sloppy murders committed by Michael and William, two brothers also involved in their cult. When Hughes returns to San Francisco and is kidnapped by the cult, Cross and a seemingly detached Craig stake out the animal preserve where it is based. Events transpire to where Cross saves Hughes and the FBI apprehends the cult. However, upon receiving another threatening call from the Mastermind, Cross arranges for his family to be moved to a safe location. Cross is afraid the Mastermind will go after Hughes and goes to her apartment to watch it. While there, he sees Craig surveilling Hughes' apartment and realizes that Craig is the Mastermind.

Calling FBI director Ronald Burns, Cross learns about the Bureau's suspicions of Craig in both the Cavalierre and Lieberman murders. Cross races back to Washington to protect as many of his relatives and friends as possible from Craig's homicidal wrath. Cross correctly deduces that Kate McTiernan, one of the protagonists from Kiss the Girls, is his next target. He finds Craig at McTiernan's home and engages in a vicious struggle with him, eventually knocking him out. When Craig comes to, Cross goads him into making a confession, which is recorded on his answering machine after he called it from his cell phone. Kyle is sent to supermax security prison ADX Florence, where he is held on death row.

=== Four Blind Mice ===
Kyle Craig returns for two brief appearances in the novel, where he is still being held in prison. Alex and him meet over the Four Blind Mice case but he gives him little information, only taunting him about his family and everyone he has lost. They meet again at the end of the book, where Kyle promises Alex that he will escape and come after him and everyone else that he loves.

=== The Big Bad Wolf ===
Kyle Craig is mentioned at the beginning of the novel and appears at the very end. Alex Cross comes to him for help, which Craig provides, and gives the name of the criminal mastermind, The Wolf, but the target is revealed to be a decoy.

=== Cross ===
Despite not appearing in the novel, Craig's presence can be felt at the beginning of the story. He writes a letter to Alex, expressing that he misses his times with him and swears revenge. He also promises that he will escape from prison one day and that he will kill his entire family with him watching.

=== Double Cross ===
Imprisoned at the supermax prison ADX Florence, Craig hatches an elaborate escape plan with his loyal attorney, Mason Wainwright. While Craig and Wainwright are having one of their regular meetings in ADX Florence—which are not monitored due to attorney–client privilege—the two men swap clothes and give each other prosthetic masks bearing their likenesses. Craig, having assumed Wainwright's identity, manages to leave the prison with ease and drive away in the lawyer's car. Wainwright, now bearing Craig's likeness, goes to his client's cell and hangs himself. However, prison officials figure out the ruse and warn Cross, who by now has started a private psychiatry practice in Washington.

Craig travels to his family's vacation home in Aspen, using another prosthetic mask to disguise himself as his dead father. He visits his mother and forces her to let him gain access to the Craig family's overseas bank accounts. After killing her, he travels the world to enjoy his newly gained freedom. He goes to Iowa City, Chicago, and Paris, where he meets three separate women and violently kills them, sexually violating at least two of the bodies. He leaves clues at his crime scenes, including an unsigned Hallmark card imitating the D.C. Audience Killer, or DCAK. Craig begins e-mailing DCAK, praising his work despite actually viewing him as an inferior amateur.

Craig leaves Paris for Washington, where he murders Nina Wolff, the judge who presided over his trial and sentenced him to death. He then has a meeting with DCAK in front of Cross' home. Events transpire to the point where Cross tracks down DCAK and engages in a knife fight in an alley. Craig appears, coaching DCAK on how to attack Cross. However, Cross manages to severely wound and incapacitate DCAK. Craig holds Cross at gunpoint and begins taunting him, but Cross' girlfriend, Detective Brianna Stone, appears on the scene and shoots Craig. Craig initially plays dead before getting up, vowing to kill Cross, and fleeing the scene.

=== Cross Country ===
The presence of Kyle Craig is felt at the end of the book, he makes a call to Alex, who has finished up a case on The Tiger and warns him that he will be coming after him soon.

=== I, Alex Cross ===
Kyle Craig once again calls Alex at the end of the novel, he doesn't make any physical appearances. He congratulates Alex on finding Caroline's killer, First Husband Theodore Vance. He tells Alex that he will give him and his new fiancée, Bree Stone, some time for rest and fun, but warns him that he will return for revenge when the time is right.

=== Cross Fire ===
Despite making several threatening phone calls to Cross, Craig doesn't return until a few years after the DCAK case. Kyle kills FBI agent, Max Siegel, assumes his identity and augments his own appearance through plastic surgery. Afterwards, Kyle kills Siegel's handler and returns to Washington, where "Siegel" is assigned to the Patriot sniper case with Cross. Craig antagonizes Cross by trying to beat him to breakthroughs in the case. He also copycats both the Patriot and the Numbers Killer, alerting Cross through cryptic clues that he is actually impersonating them.

After solving both the Patriot and Numbers cases, Cross marries Washington detective Brianna "Bree" Stone. Craig—still impersonating Siegel—shows up at Cross's honeymoon and attempts to take Cross' family hostage. With the help of Stone, Cross eventually subdues and arrests Craig, who is surprised that Cross refuses to kill him. As he is being taken into custody, Craig steals an officer's gun and shoots an air tank, which explodes and seemingly kills him.

This marks the final appearance of Kyle Craig, officially making him the most recurring villain in the series.

== Adaptations ==
Kyle Craig has been featured in two films of the Alex Cross series as a supporting character, without any mention of a criminal career or antagonizing of Cross. He appeared in Kiss the Girls and Along Came a Spider, being played both times by Jay O. Sanders.

In the Amazon Prime series, Cross, Craig has been reimagined as Kayla Craig, played by Israeli actress Alona Tal.
