= Alex Cross (film series) =

1997–2012 film series by James Patterson

- Created by: James Patterson
- Owners: Paramount Pictures (1997–2001); Lionsgate (2012)
- Years: 1997–2012

Films and television
- Film(s): Original films: Kiss the Girls (1997); Along Came a Spider (2001); Reboot: Alex Cross (2012)

The Alex Cross film series is an American film series of three thriller films, based on the fictional character Alex Cross, who originally appeared in a series of novels of the same name by James Patterson. In the film series, Morgan Freeman and Tyler Perry have portrayed Alex Cross.

== Films ==
- Kiss the Girls (1997)
- Along Came a Spider (2001)
- Alex Cross (2012)

=== Cancelled sequel ===
Prior to the film Alex Cross (2012) release, Double Cross was scheduled to be adapted into a film, with Tyler Perry reprising the role, but the film was cancelled after Alex Cross did not perform well at the box office.

== Cast ==
Characters	Films		
Characters	Kiss the Girls	Along Came a Spider	Alex Cross
Characters	1997	2001	2012
Alex Cross	Morgan Freeman	Morgan Freeman	Tyler Perry
Kyle Craig	Jay O. Sanders	Jay O. Sanders	
Mrs. Vicki Cross	Anna Maria Horsford	Anna Maria Horsford	
Janelle Cross	Tatyana Ali		Yara Shahidi
Regina "Nana Mama" Cross	Helen Martin		Cicely Tyson
Dr. Kate McTiernan	Ashley Judd		
Detective Nick Ruskin / Cassanova	Cary Elwes		
Dr. William Rudolph / Gentleman Caller	Tony Goldwyn		
John Sampson	Bill Nunn		
Naomi Cross	Gina Ravera		
Jezzie Flannigan		Monica Potter	
Gary Soneji / The Spider		Michael Wincott	
Ollie McArthur		Dylan Baker	
Megan Rose		Mika Boorem	
Dimitri Starodubov		Anton Yelchin	
Ben Devine		Billy Burke	
Senator Hank Rose		Michael Moriarty	
Elizabeth Rose		Penelope Ann Miller	
Damon Cross			Sayeed Shahidi
Picasso			Matthew Fox
Tommy Kane			Edward Burns
Giles Mercier			Jean Reno
Maria Cross			Carmen Ejogo
Monica Ashe			Rachel Nichols
Captain Richard Brookwell			John C. McGinley
Erich Nunemacher			Werner Daehn
Fan Yau Lee			Stephanie Jacobsen
Pop Pop Jones			Simenona Martinez
Detective Jody Klebanoff			Bonnie Bentley

== Crew ==
Crew/Detail	Film		
Crew/Detail	Kiss the Girls	Along Came a Spider	Alex Cross
Crew/Detail	1997	2001	2012
Director	Gary Fleder	Lee Tamahori	Rob Cohen
Producer(s)	David Brown; Joe Wizan	David Brown; Joe Wizan	Bill Block; Steve Bowen; Randall Emmett; Leopoldo Gout; Paul Hanson; James Patterson
Writer(s)	Screenplay by David Klass; Based on Kiss the Girls by James Patterson	Screenplay by Marc Moss; Based on Along Came a Spider by James Patterson	Screenplay by Marc Moss; Kerry Williamson; Based on Cross by James Patterson
Composer	Mark Isham	Jerry Goldsmith	John Debney
Director of photography	Aaron Schneider	Matthew F. Leonetti	Ricardo Della Rosa
Editor(s)	Armen Minasian; Harvey Rosenstock; William Steinkamp	Neil Travis	Matt Diezel; Thom Noble
Production company	Rysher Entertainment	Phase 1 Productions; Revelations Entertainment	QED International; Block/Hanson; Emmett/Furla Films; Envision Entertainment Corporation; IAC Productions; James Patterson Entertainment; Summit Entertainment
Distributor	Paramount Pictures	Paramount Pictures	Lionsgate Films
Release date	October 3, 1997	April 6, 2001	October 19, 2012
Running time	117 minutes	103 minutes	101 minutes

== Reception ==
=== Box office performance ===
Film	Release date	Box office gross			Budget	Reference
Film	Release date	North America	Other territories	Worldwide	Budget	Reference
Kiss the Girls	October 3, 1997			$60,527,873	$27 million	
Along Came a Spider	April 6, 2001	$74,078,174	$31,100,387	$105,178,561	$60 million	
Alex Cross	October 19, 2012	$25,888,412	$8,700,000	$34,588,412	$35 million	
Total				$200,294,936	$122 million	

=== Critical and public response ===
Film	Rotten Tomatoes	Metacritic	CinemaScore
Kiss the Girls	32% (34 reviews)	46 (17 reviews)	B+
Along Came a Spider	32% (125 reviews)	42 (31 reviews)	B+
Alex Cross	11% (128 reviews)	30 (34 reviews)	A
