= Cross Country (novel) =

2008 novel by James Patterson

- Author: James Patterson
- Language: English
- Series: Alex Cross
- Genre: Crime, mystery, thriller
- Publisher: Little, Brown
- Publication date: November 17, 2008
- Publication place: United States
- Media type: Print (hardcover)
- Pages: 400 pp (first edition, hardback)
- ISBN: 978-0-7394-9218-5
- OCLC: 297182367
- Preceded by: Double Cross
- Followed by: Alex Cross' Trial

Cross Country is the 14th novel in the Alex Cross series by James Patterson. According to the Library Journal, it was the second most borrowed fiction book in United States libraries in 2009.

== Plot ==
An African warlord known as the Tiger, aided by his crew of angry young men, horrifically murders author Eleanor 'Ellie' Cox and her entire family. Alex Cross and girlfriend Bree Stone go investigate, when Alex recalls Ellie had been his one time girlfriend, whom he had loved at one point. He is instantly terrified by this so much he gets no sleep, does no work for the case, and stays up late at night, sitting in his bed. He then figures out the Tiger's next murder, and arrives on time to stop the Tiger and his gang of kids, where most of the villains escape including the Tiger and most of his gang. After gaining access from the CIA he plans on going to Nigeria, where he hopes to find and stop the Tiger, using the knowledge based on the Tiger's whereabouts. After convincing a bitter Nanna and nervous Bree, he goes on a plane trip to Nigeria, where he is annoyed by their customs. He is then kidnapped by 'cops' and put in jail, where his nose is broken, he is horribly injured, and starves as well as having to deal with no water. After nearly three days or more, he is bailed out by American Ian Flaherty who gives Cross advice to flee while he still can. He is then called by Bree who says there has been another murder by the Tiger.

Instead of listening to Flaherty, Cross instead goes to Sierra Leone, where he meets veteran and amputee, Moses, who feeds him and gives him water. Later that night, Cross, when alone by himself, is ambushed by the Tiger's gang, however, he escapes with Moses' help and buys a truck which he later gives to Moses. Father Bombata, a priest whom he met during the plane ride to Nigeria, informs him his cousin, Addane Tansi, may be able to help Alex, who meets Addane, a reporter who had, unbeknownst to Alex, befriended Ellie, who had gone to Nigeria some time before her death. Addane introduces Alex to her family and shares a kiss with him, which he refuses to think of because of Bree; Flaherty later reveals that the Tiger's real name is Abidemi Sowande. Alex and Addane go to a hobo camp where they are attacked by Janjaweed, ruthless men who rape, injure, and kill women and children. After barely escaping due to the 'Peacekeepers' who only do it so they gain no bad publicity, especially by Addane. After returning to Nigeria, Cross and Addane discover that Addane's family have been murdered. When trying to get closer, Cross and Addane are taken to jail by cops. Alex witnesses Addane get murdered by Tiger after being raped, and is released afterwards.

Heading home, he learns that Alex's family have been kidnapped by the Tiger, who then gives Alex coordinates to the hideout. Alex, Bree, and John Sampson go and defeat the Tiger's gang, while Alex follows Sowande (Tiger). Bree kills the Tiger by shooting him in the eye. Ian Flaherty is revealed to be working with Sownande and is arrested. Shortly afterward, his family are found; Alex instantly thinks the CIA might have worked with the Tiger. Alex calls upon Merrill Snyder and Steven Millard, from the CIA, and arrests them, after discovering they and Flaherty were associated with Tiger. The book ends as Alex gets an alarming phone call from Kyle Craig, who has escaped from prison and wants revenge on Alex Cross after the events in the previous book.

== Sequels ==
A sequel was released on August 29, 2009, entitled Alex Cross' Trial. This was followed by six others featuring Cross: I, Alex Cross, Cross Fire, Kill Alex Cross, Merry Christmas, Alex Cross, Alex Cross, Run and Cross My Heart.

== Reception ==
Time thought that Cross Country "[is] The most heart-stopping, speed-charged, electrifying Alex Cross thriller yet." The book was a #1 New York Times bestseller for many weeks, and was a #1 in both Publisher's Weekly and Entertainment Weekly, and #2 in the Wall Street Journal.
