= Mary, Mary (novel) =

2005 book by James Patterson

- First edition
- Author: James Patterson
- Language: English
- Series: Alex Cross
- Genre: Crime, mystery, thriller
- Publisher: Little, Brown
- Publication date: November 14, 2005
- Pages: 308
- ISBN: 978-0-446-61903-5
- OCLC: 7244507
- Preceded by: London Bridges
- Followed by: Cross

Mary, Mary is the 11th novel by James Patterson featuring the former Washington, D.C. homicide detective and forensic psychiatrist and current FBI agent Alex Cross. It was published on November 14, 2005.

== Plot ==
FBI Agent Alex Cross is on vacation in Los Angeles with his family and his girlfriend Jamilla Hughes (from Violets Are Blue) when he receives word that a Hollywood actress has been murdered. The actress was shot and her face violently slashed with a knife. An email describing the killer's mindset before and during the murder as well as allusions to the killer's motivation was sent to an entertainment reporter named Arnold Grinner at the Los Angeles Times. The emails are signed "Mary Smith". The actress happens to be friends with the wife of the President of the United States who has asked FBI Director Ron Burns to look into the matter. Burns then gives the case to Cross, who goes to the scene, despite protests from Nana and Jamilla. He does not return until very late in the afternoon, by which time Jamilla has left to return to San Francisco, which doesn't surprise Alex, and Alex Jr. "Ali" has been taken away by Christine, who had come down to spend time with Ali and Alex.

During a trial to determine who takes custody over Ali, Christine's attorney uses evidence of a picture of Ali and Cross' family being evacuated from the house for safety (in the Big Bad Wolf). Her attorney also points out that a "stranger" is carrying Ali from the house. However, Alex notices that the so-called "stranger" is John Sampson, his best friend, who works for the DCPD (the D.C. Police Department), angering Alex. Christine eventually wins custody with Alex getting over 40 days of time with Ali only. Meanwhile, Alex later meets up on another date with Jamilla, who reveals that she has been seeing another man (an unknown lawyer) since the beginning of his new case. Alex realizes that he has lost Jamilla, largely because Alex has been focusing more on his job. They both decide to end their relationship and remain friends. Alex and Jamilla say an emotional goodbye and go their separate ways. Alex constantly goes and comes from Los Angeles for the Mary Smith case, which is assigned to LAPD cop Jeanne Galleta.

Additional victims, including a movie producer and a local TV anchorwoman, turn up. Galleta and he get several leads and also go out to eat and share a kiss. After several murders, a final crime scene shows Arnold Grinner being killed. However, actions supposedly caused by Alex send Galleta off the case and she is on the case of a blue Chevrolet Suburban speeding away from one of the murder scenes, which may be a lead. Further investigation reveals the owner of one such Suburban whose owner lives near the Internet café where many of the Mary Smith emails were sent. A variety of other evidence also corroborates the conclusion that the Suburban's owner is, in fact, the Mary Smith killer. Sampson, and his wife, Billie, meet up for a welcome back party for Alex, while Alex says that he wants Sampson to work for the FBI with him while Sampson asks him to work for the DC Police Department.

Cross interviews the Suburban's owner, Mary Wagner. In doing so, he discovers that she suffers from some sort of psychological disorder that either led or caused her to kill her three children 20 years ago and has thus tried to live on by pretending they are still alive. The police show up and arrest her because of this. Alex goes to speak with her while she is in custody, and she tries to get his gun, but he eventually takes it back from her. To investigate the killings further, Cross travels to the Suburban owner's small hometown in Vermont and discovers that after her children were killed, she was institutionalized at a state mental hospital from which she later escaped. Another clue that supports she is the killer is that her children's names are Adam, Ashley, and Brendan. At each crime scene, stickers with two As and one B often show up – similar to her children's names. Other clues include her job as a maid – in one of the murders, a maid was killed and the bed in which two guests were having sex in was cleaned up and done – and that she was late to or missed work on the times of the murders.

At the mental hospital, Cross examines the log of visitors who had come to see the Suburban owner and discovers a familiar name. Upon contacting LAPD he informs them of a possible suspect and it is told that the suspect's house is being watched. He gets a taxi, which has a dead reporter named Truscott, and the actual Mary Smith killer: Michael Bell, who calls himself "the Storyteller". Bell killed his wife and others, and framed Mary Wagner. After a car crash, leading up to a fight, Cross overpowers Bell and kills him. In the hospital, he is told by Jeanne Galleta that Mary (the original suspect) killed herself. At home, Christine decides to give Ali back to Cross permanently, giving him full custody. Later on, Alex, after being told by Nana to not make his children "orphans" like Alex was, ponders if he should stay in the FBI. He refuses Samspon's offer to return to the department and decides that "something in his life needs to change".

== Sequel ==
In the 12th book in the series, Cross, Alex decides to quit the FBI due to the events of Mary, Mary and becomes a therapist again. After breaking up with Jamilla Hughes, Alex starts a new relationship with Kayla Coles, who has been interested in Alex since Four Blind Mice. The two continue their relationship through the sequel. In Cross, Alex faces off against a new antagonist named Michael "The Butcher" Sullivan, who might be his deceased wife's killer.
