= I, Alex Cross =

Novel by James Patterson

- Author: James Patterson
- Language: English
- Series: Alex Cross
- Genre: Crime, mystery, thriller
- Publisher: Little, Brown
- Publication date: November 16, 2009
- Publication place: United States
- Media type: Print (hardcover)
- ISBN: 0-316-01878-3
- Preceded by: Alex Cross's Trial
- Followed by: Cross Fire

I, Alex Cross is the 16th novel in the Alex Cross series by James Patterson. It was released in hardcover and paperback on November 16, 2009, to positive reviews and positive reception. It is preceded by Alex Cross's Trial. Its success led to five sequel novels, Cross Fire, Kill Alex Cross, Merry Christmas, Alex Cross, Alex Cross, Run and Cross My Heart.

== Plot summary ==
Detective Alex Cross is enjoying a birthday party with his family when he receives a call from his bosses informing him that Caroline, the 24-year-old only daughter of his late brother Blake, has been found murdered in Virginia. Cross and his girlfriend Briana Stone rush to Richmond, Virginia, and are shocked to discover that Caroline's body was found dismembered (most likely by a wood chipper) in the trunk of a car driven by someone with connections to organized crime.

Cross takes the case and one of his first stops is Caroline's apartment. Cross is shocked to discover she only lived a few miles from him and yet never contacted him. He is further shocked to discover that based on the apartment's locale and the extensive lingerie wardrobe inside, Caroline was a high-end escort. Further investigation reveals that several other young people with connections to high-end prostitution have also either been murdered or disappeared under suspicious circumstances and that Caroline's escorting activities took her to a secretive club in Culpeper, Virginia, called Blacksmith Farms, where she may have met an ultra-secretive masked character named Zeus.

During the course of his investigation, Cross is thwarted by various people in Washington, D.C.—including the Secret Service and the President of the United States—who all want Cross to hand over his investigation to them. Cross refuses and is almost forced to give up his investigative efforts when his old FBI friend Ned Mahoney recommends Cross follow up on a lead provided by a country farmer.

The lead turns out to be an escort who saw Zeus without his mask on. All escorts—like Cross's niece Caroline—who saw Zeus without his mask were quickly killed and their bodies dismembered. This escort, however, managed to escape, but not before being shot in the back. The farmer managed to find her and nurse her back to health. The escort reveals that Zeus is actually Theodore Vance, husband to current US President Maggie Vance. Theodore Vance has a compulsion for young escorts and is able to indulge in it with the help of various people (like his Secret Service detail) who want to keep it quiet to protect the current presidential administration.

Cross goes to a party at the Kennedy Center in Washington, D.C. to question Theodore Vance about his connection to Zeus. Sensing that President Vance's administration is about to be brought down by Theodore Vance's arrest, Theodore Vance's personal Secret Service agent (Dan Cormorant), in a final act of loyalty to his country, shoots and kills Theodore Vance. Cormorant is immediately killed by other Secret Service agents.

By killing Vance, Cormorant has allowed the Vance presidential administration to survive and spared the country the embarrassment of a sex scandal. Instead, Theodore Vance will be remembered as a presidential spouse who was tragically and inexplicably killed by a rogue Secret Service agent. The novel ends with Alex asking Bree to marry him as Kyle Craig gives Cross a phone call, stating that he wants to have "fun" with Cross, but he will give him a break since his case with Zeus.

== Release ==
The book was released in hardback, paperback, and audiobook. Excerpts can be read at the official James Patterson website.

== Sequels ==
Due to the novel's positive success, it was reported to have been given five sequels: Cross Fire, Kill Alex Cross, Merry Christmas, Alex Cross, Alex Cross, Run, and Save Alex Cross.

== Film adaptation ==
It was reported that there would be a new Alex Cross movie, which was planned for a 2012 release, and was to be a reboot of the original series featuring Morgan Freeman, with Tyler Perry being cast as Cross.
