= Alex Cross =

Novel series by James Patterson

Alex Cross series
- Along Came a Spider; Kiss the Girls; Jack & Jill; Cat and Mouse; Pop Goes the Weasel; Roses Are Red; Violets Are Blue; Four Blind Mice; The Big Bad Wolf; London Bridges; Mary, Mary; Cross; Double Cross; Cross Country; Alex Cross's Trial; I, Alex Cross; Cross Fire; Kill Alex Cross; Merry Christmas, Alex Cross; Alex Cross, Run; Cross My Heart; Hope to Die; Cross Justice; Cross the Line; The People vs. Alex Cross; Target: Alex Cross; Criss Cross; Deadly Cross; Fear No Evil; Triple Cross; Cross Down; Alex Cross Must Die; The House of Cross; Return of the Spider
- Author: James Patterson
- Country: United States
- Language: English
- Genre: Mystery, Crime; Thriller
- Publisher: Little, Brown
- Media type: Hardcover; Paperback audio book

Alex Cross is a crime, mystery, and thriller novel series written by James Patterson. The protagonist, Alex Cross, is an African-American detective for the Metropolitan Police Department and a father who confronts threats to his family and to Washington, D.C. Supporting characters include Cross's children, Damon, Janelle, and Ali (Little Alex), as well as his grandmother, Nana Mama. The series is typically narrated in the first-person by Alex Cross, with occasional shifts to the villains' third-person perspectives.

The series began in 1993 and is ongoing. Some of the entries in the series that have achieved bestseller status and garnered favorable reviews include Double Cross, Cross Fire, I, Alex Cross, and Alex Cross, Run.

The series is published worldwide, with Little, Brown currently holding publication rights in the United States, in paperback, hardcover, and audiobook editions. The first book in the series, Along Came a Spider, was released in 1993 to positive reviews, spawning a series of over twenty subsequent novels. The series has resulted in three films, Kiss the Girls (1997), Along Came a Spider (2001), and Alex Cross (2012), and a television series Cross.

== Plot overview ==
Alex Cross is a widower, detective, and father who fights against criminals who wish to kill Cross and others. The story follows Cross as he attempts to solve difficult cases while maintaining a relationship with his family. One of the antagonists in the earlier books is Gary Soneji, who wants to kill Cross for putting him in prison. Cross sometimes works with (or against) the President and Secret Service in a few books such as Along Came a Spider, Jack & Jill, I, Alex Cross, and Kill Alex Cross. An ongoing theme in the earlier novels is the unsolved murder of his first wife, Maria.

== Characters ==
- Alex Cross, the main character of the series. Born Alexander Isaiah Cross, he has a Ph.D. in Psychology from Johns Hopkins University and has worked for both the Washington, D.C. Police Department and Federal Bureau of Investigation. His mother died of cancer and he thought his father was dead as well. His wife was murdered by an assassin, which leaves Cross a widower with two children and his grandmother, Nana Mama. In the first few books he is alone until he meets and falls in love with a woman named Christine, with whom he has a third child — a boy — named Alex Jr or Ali. During the books Cross is hunted by a criminal/threat in Washington, D.C., where he lives, which causes Christine to leave him out of fear. He is a detective who tries to be as close to his family as can be. After Christine left him, Alex later started dating again, but some of the women have either died or left him over the course of the novels. By the novel Cross, Alex discovers that an assassin named Jimmy Hats Galati, murdered his wife and was killed by his best friend, John Sampson, who didn't want Alex to go down the road of revenge. Now having solved the murder of his wife, Alex finds the will to move on with his life, finding peace for the first time. In the newest books, he begins a relationship with Bree Stone, whom he eventually marries. Since Roses Are Red up to Cross Fire, The Mastermind, Kyle Craig, has been his primary enemy. It is unknown exactly why Craig wants to kill Alex however. Craig is to have supposedly died in Cross Fire. Cross allows the adopted girl, Ava (after Nana Mama finds her in Kill Alex Cross), to live with his family. Alex marries Bree in Cross Fire and is finally at peace with her. He has had three major love interests throughout the series, Maria Cross (his deceased wife), Christine Johnson (his ex-girlfriend, whom he'd been engaged to), and Bree (his current wife). He has been friends with Sampson since he was 10, meaning they've been friends since he first arrived in Washington, D.C. In Alex Cross, Run, Alex faces several cases and his life becomes severely complicated. When Ava is murdered, he finds her killer and avenges her death along with Bree. However, he still faces several issues: problems with his new wife, Bree; what he will do after Ava's death and whether he will continue being a detective; if he may have children with Bree; and if he will ever stop having to face the recurring problem in his life - endangering himself and his family all the time. Finally, his shrink says she will help him deal with his life for as long as it takes.
- John Sampson, is Cross's best friend since childhood and also his partner. Sampson, in Cross is known to have killed Jimmy Hats Galati, Alex's deceased wife's killer. John explains that he didn't want to see Jimmy get away with murdering Alex's wife and also didn't want to see Alex go down a road of revenge and had decided to avenge Alex's wife for him. In another book, Double Cross he is taken hostage while trying to solve the case with Cross's new love interest, Brianna Stone. In earlier books, the first few, he is seen to have had been in love with Nina Childs, who dies in Pop Goes the Weasel causing him to vow to find the killer and get him. In Along Came a Spider some background history is told, one being that when Alex moved to Washington, D.C., after his parents' death (and his move with grandmother Nana Mama) he instantly became friends with Alex. They were known for robbing grocery stores when they were teenagers. Sampson got married in Four Blind Mice to a woman, who he fell in love with, named Billie, despite his reluctance since he is afraid of being a father because his parents were so horrible. It is said that Billie is first and only girl that he has ever had sex with. In Alex Cross, Run Sampson informs Alex that Ava has been killed and later assists Bree and Alex in avenging Ava's death.
- Brianna Stone/Cross, who is Cross' girlfriend/now wife, and was also a detective. She first appeared in Double Cross, where she was already in a relationship with at the start of the book. Bree's life is the same as Alex's life. She has no family, friends, children of her own. She works with Alex as well so she has no vocation of her own, Bree is described as a tough Bureau detective, and is put on the case for DCAK, which she works with Alex and Sampson. At the beginning and near the end of the novel, she professes her love for Alex. In Cross Country, Bree and Alex's relationship continues to grow stronger. She helps him investigate The Tiger, especially when his family is kidnapped by the killer also. In I, Alex Cross, Bree is shown living with Alex at the Cross home. She continues to stay at the Cross house to take care of Nana Mama, after Nana nearly dies. In the end of the book, Alex proposes to her and she happily accepts. In Cross Fire, both Bree and Alex look forward to their wedding, while at the same time dealing with Kyle Craig. They get married after facing off against Kyle Craig "the Mastermind" one final time. At the end of the novel, Kyle is killed and Bree and Alex are finally enjoying a life of peace together. In Kill Alex Cross she discovers a homeless girl trying to steal from the Cross house, and later agrees to adopt her due to Nanna's wishes. In Merry Christmas, Alex Cross she seems distraught and annoyed that Alex must be away from his family on Christmas. However, at the end of the novel, Alex and her share a dance while on a double date with Sampson and Billie, and they share a kiss. In Alex Cross, Run she is distraught and wants vengeance when Ava, a young girl she and Nana adopted, is burned alive. She and Sampson assist Alex in capturing Ava's murderer and killing him. At the end of the novel, she and Alex continue to recover from the death of Ava and their love for each other remains strong.
- Nana Mama, the matriarch of the Cross family. She is Cross's grandmother that took him in when he was 10, since both his parents had died. She is currently entering her 90s, having nearly died in I, Alex Cross and adopting a young girl named Ava in Kill Alex Cross. She is described as a very "old woman", but tough for her age. She is also described by Alex as "stubborn". She usually argues with Alex over several things thus Alex dumbs her as "old woman" and "stubborn". She approves of Alex's new wife, Bree Stone, and considers her to be a daughter to her. Nana was once married to Alex's grandfather, who she was deeply in love with. Once he died, Nana never married again or dated, as it was mentioned in Four Blind Mice. She is also known for always having the last word against Alex.
- Damon, Janelle, Ali, Alex's children. Damon and Janelle were the first to be born, born to Maria Cross—Damon is the oldest—while "Ali" Alex Jr.'s mother is Christine Johnson. Alex and Christine were engaged. In fact, Christine was the first real love interest Alex had after Maria died. Alex has known Christine since Jack & Jill, but started dating in Cat and Mouse. In Pop Goes the Weasel, she gives birth to Ali, while being held by Geoffrey Shaffer. She leaves Ali with Alex in Roses Are Red. In Double Cross Damon goes away to Cushing Academy, a (fictional) prep school in Massachusetts, and doesn't return until Cross Country. Ali, however, is not featured in Merry Christmas, Alex Cross since he is spending Christmas with his true mother, Christine, who is briefly mentioned in the book. Ava, a girl that Nana Mama finds in Kill Alex Cross is first seen/mentioned in Kill Alex Cross where she tries to steal but is caught by Bree and Nana Mama. Ava was never legally adopted by the Cross family but lived with them for a little while. She returns, along with Damon and Jannie in the 19th novel in the series, Merry Christmas. Ava is sent to a housing home for orphans again sometime during the events of Alex Cross, Run, for doing drugs. At the end of the novel, she is burned alive by one of Alex's newest nemesis. Alex's deceased wife, Maria, was once pregnant with his third child, before Ali came along, who died when Maria was killed.
- Christine Johnson with a PhD in Education and Principal at a school where a couple of her school children are murdered, she is Alex's first real love interest since Maria. Alex proposed to her three times and she finally said yes. She was afraid of something happening to him because he worked with such dangerous people. She knew about Sonji and one of those dangerous people killed her husband. They were engaged but never married. She first appears in Jack and Jill where her husband is killed and she meets Alex. In Cat and Mouse she begins dating him and the two fall madly in love with each other. In Pop Goes the Weasel she is kidnapped while the family vacationed in Jamaica and was captive for over a year; during that time she discovers that she is pregnant with Alex's child. Alex is able to find her and their newborn son, Ali. In Roses Are Red she becomes afraid due to the events in previous novels, and the baby, who she names after Alex, is living with her. She begins to distant herself from Alex, fearing the work he does and believing that her life is ruined after the kidnapping. She suffered a lot having her first child alone; far away from family, friends, coworkers, and her fiancé (the father of her child). She was all alone and this was detrimental to her and Alex's relationship. She had already witnessed Alex being severely beaten so much so that he nearly died. She had to be escorted to the hospital to see him. Having her first husband die in front of here, seeing Alex being severely beaten, and being kidnapped, took its toll on her. She eventually leaves for Seattle and also leaves Alex "Ali" with Alex. She returns in Big Bad Wolf to claim custody over Ali. In Mary, Mary she appears in court for custody of Ali and wins, but near the end of the book, she gives Ali to Alex. Realizing he needed to be with his dad. She returns in Cross Fire to spend time with Alex, after hearing that he is going to marry Bree Stone, but ends up angering him and leaves after her time with Ali. During the novel, it is hinted that she still harbors some love for Alex and at times, Alex appears to harbor love for her as well. He even said once "What might have been" when he spent time with her and Ali in Seattle. She is mentioned again in Merry Christmas, Alex Cross because Ali spent Christmas with her. She was Damon and Jannie's elementary school principal when her and Alex started dating.
- Maria Simpson/Cross is Alex Cross's deceased wife and first love. Despite only being mentioned in the first eleven books in the series, Maria makes her first appearance in a flashback setting in Cross. She is described as being "too short" and having a "beautiful smile". Before being killed, Maria was working as a social worker in Washington D.C. when she met Alex Cross for the first time. They first met at St. Anthony's Hospital and fell in love soon after. They married and moved into an apartment together. Damon was born later in the marriage and Janelle was born sometime before Maria's death. Maria was revealed to be pregnant with their third child, during the events of Cross. When Alex came to pick up Maria from her work place, Maria was shot by an unknown sniper and died in Alex's arms. Her last words to Alex were that she loved him. It remains unknown if the shooter was aiming for Maria or Alex. After her death, Alex moved out of the apartment and back to his grandma's place. Maria's murderer was never caught, until the novel Cross, where it is revealed that a mob assassin named Jimmy Hats Galati, was responsible for killing Maria. John Sampson was the one to avenge Maria, to spare Alex from losing what was left of his soul. Maria has been the reason for Alex's motivation of taking on cases from the very beginning of the series. After the events of Cross, Alex has managed to let go of Maria, allowing himself to move on with his life.

=== Notable antagonists ===
- Kyle Craig/The Mastermind, the main antagonist of the series. He is first introduced in the earlier novels, but doesn't become an actual villain until Roses Are Red where he robs the bank and goes on a killing spree while trying to kill Cross. He is stopped by Cross in the following book Violets Are Blue and is put into prison. In Double Cross he escapes from prison and begins a new massacre while another murderer, known as DCAK begins a new reign of terror, and runs away. He gives a taunting phone call, foreshadowing his return, in I, Alex Cross and he in fact does return in Cross Fire in which he disguises himself as Max Siegel and tries to kill Alex again. He once again fails and, shortly before going to prison again, picks up an officer's gun and kills himself—as well as two officers—by shooting a gas tank. He was once an FBI agent and friend of Alex, but was later explained to have always been a murderer. He had killed his abusive father, presumably killed one of his brothers, and later killed his mother. In Violets Are Blue several things are explained about Craig: in Kiss the Girls he went to college and killed with the villains; he is presumably an atheist, believing he is second to no one; he wants to kill Alex because he wants to prove to himself that he is truly smarter than Cross—but his reason is later changed to be for ruining Kyle's life by sending him to prison. He is described as a "woman hater" despite possibly having a crush on Kate McTiernan in Kiss the Girls. Craig helps Alex on several cases since the first book and even offers Alex a job at the FBI at one-point, which Alex accepts after Kyle is arrested. Kyle is briefly seen in the films Kiss the Girls and Along Came a Spider. In the new novel, Double Cross, Kyle escapes from prison and murders a few people while on the loose, with his mother being one of the victims. At the end of the novel, he is still at large, despite being wounded by Alex and his girlfriend, Bree Stone. Kyle makes another full return in Cross Fire, where he takes the identity of Max Siegel by plastic surgery. He uses his new identity to gain the trust of Alex once more before revealing himself at the end of the novel. He engages in a final fight with Alex and his wife, Bree Stone, where he is wounded and arrested. Not wanting to go back to prison, Kyle kills himself by shooting an oxygen tank.
- Gary Soneji/The Son of Lindbergh: is the main antagonist of Along Came a Spider, where he kidnaps two children from rich families and is captured later on. He meets Alex for the first time and promises to kill him in the nearby future. He is sent to prison by the end of the book and is still there in Kiss the Girls. However, he escapes in Jack & Jill and later calls Alex by the end, promising to see him soon. In the fourth book Cat and Mouse he tries to kill Cross (as well as a man who had raped him in prison), but is killed when he tries to throw a fire grenade but accidentally drops it on himself, burning him alive. Later on in the novel, his friend later attacks Alex as instructions from Soneji. While Kyle Craig is the series' main antagonist, Soneji is Alex's deadliest adversary, and is therefore much more powerful in his own way than the "Mastermind," who is not as deadly as Soneji but is depicted as the main villain. Soneji appears in the movie adaptation Along Came A Spider, but dies in the film (which does not happen in that novel). He also gave the Cross family a cat, Rosie, in Jack and Jill which they keep and start getting attached to - despite Alex's initial hesitant response, thinking the cat to be rigged with a surveillance device of some sort. The cat is thereafter mentioned in most books. Soneji is also seen in two books, and is mentioned in several others.
- DCAK standing for DC Audience Killer, brother and sister Anthony and Sandy start a killing spree, which Bree Stone is put on the case, while Alex decides to help and nicknames them 'DCAK.' They appear in Double Cross. In the book they are believed to be lovers, while brother and sister. In the novel they kidnap Sampson — keeping him hostage — while Alex and Bree stop them. Sandy is killed while Anthony is chased in hot pursuit by Alex. He is eventually shot and defeated; while Alex learns that Kyle Craig is back and in D.C., after learning DCAK was sort of working with the Mastermind (since they 'admired him). Craig is shot and flees; at a hospital, Anthony vows revenge on Alex.
- Geoffrey Shafer/The Weasel, the antagonist of Pop Goes the Weasel and secondary antagonist in London Bridges. Shafer is responsible for kidnapping Christine Johnson, Alex's fiancée at the time, and killing his own wife, Lucy, in Pop Goes the Weasel. He is not seen until three or four books later (London Bridges) where he is forced to work with the Wolf, a serial killer and powerful organized crime boss. He is then assigned to keep Alex Cross busy and later decides to hunt down Alex in London, only to be fatally wounded and killed by Cross when he confronts him. In the novel Pop Goes The Weasel, Geoffrey competes with a small group of other people, known as The Horsemen to kill people, or "live their fantasies". He is also known to have started killing many years before he was even introduced and has gone over 100 murders. Shafer is described as one of Alex's worst enemies.
- The Wolf, is the antagonist of both The Big Bad Wolf and London Bridges. The Wolf is considered to be the first and only super-villain that Alex Cross has ever faced in the series. He is responsible for a network of human smuggling in The Big Bad Wolf and is never caught. His identity remained unknown until the end of London Bridges, when he returns with Geoffrey Shafer to take on Alex. The Wolf's real name is revealed to be "Anton Christyakov". The Wolf is in control of an organization that proves to be very powerful in the events of the novel. At the end of London Bridges, Anton kills himself with poison, in order to avoid the authorities. Despite Kyle Craig, Gary Soneji, and Geoffrey Shafer, The Wolf has proven to be more dangerous than any of them. Being able to keep his identity safe, forcing other killers to do his bidding, and taking on world governments.

== Book list ==
The earlier novels were initially named after children's rhymes, but from 2006 the lead character's name started appearing in the titles.

1. Along Came a Spider (1993, title from line in "Little Miss Muffet"): In the first novel of the series, Gary Soneji poses as a math teacher and kidnaps Maggie Rose Dunne, daughter of famed actress Katherine Dunne, and her best friend.
  In 2001, the novel was adapted into a film starring Morgan Freeman as Alex Cross, Monica Potter as Jezzie Flannigan, and Michael Wincott as Soneji.
2. Kiss the Girls (1995, title taken from line in "Georgie Porgie")
  In 1997, the novel was adapted into a film starring Morgan Freeman as Alex Cross and Ashley Judd as Kate McTiernan.
3. Jack & Jill (1996, title taken from "Jack and Jill" nursery rhyme)
4. Cat and Mouse (1997)
5. Pop Goes the Weasel (1999, title taken from "Pop Goes the Weasel" nursery rhyme)
6. Roses are Red (2000, title taken from "Roses Are Red" poem)
7. Violets Are Blue (2001, title taken from "Roses Are Red" poem)
8. Four Blind Mice (2002, title derived from "Three Blind Mice" nursery rhyme)
9. The Big Bad Wolf (2003, title taken from Big Bad Wolf archetype)
10. London Bridges (2004, title derived from first line of "London Bridge Is Falling Down" nursery rhyme)
11. Mary, Mary (2005, title from "Mary, Mary, Quite Contrary" nursery rhyme)
12. Cross (2006)
  In 2012, the novel was adapted into a film, titled Alex Cross, starring Tyler Perry as Alex Cross and Matthew Fox as The Butcher (renamed Picasso in the film).
13. Double Cross (2007)
14. Cross Country (2008)
15. Alex Cross's Trial (2009): In this story within a story concept, Alex writes about one of his ancestors, Abraham Cross.
16. I, Alex Cross (2009)
17. Cross Fire (2010)
18. Kill Alex Cross (2011)
19. Merry Christmas, Alex Cross (2012)
20. Alex Cross, Run (2013)
21. Cross My Heart (2013)
22. Hope to Die (2014)
23. Cross Justice (2015)
24. Cross the Line (2016)
25. The People vs. Alex Cross (2017)
26. Target: Alex Cross (2018)
27. Criss Cross (2019)
28. Deadly Cross (2020)
29. Fear No Evil (2021)
30. Triple Cross (2022)
31. Cross Down (2023) (co-written with Brenden DuBois; also a John Sampson solo book)
32. Alex Cross Must Die (2023)
33. The House of Cross (2024)
34. Return of the Spider (2025)

Novellas

1. Cross Kill (2016)
2. Detective Cross (2017)

Ali Cross Series

1. Ali Cross (2019)
2. Ali Cross: Like Father, Like Son (2021)
3. Ali Cross: The Secret Detective (2022)

== Film adaptations ==
Overall there have been three theatrical films of the Alex Cross series – Kiss the Girls, Along Came a Spider, and Alex Cross. All met with mixed reviews. The first two movies were financially successful, the third one wasn't.

=== Films ===
Two films, based on the first two Cross novels though filmed in reverse order, have been made starring Morgan Freeman (Kiss the Girls and Along Came a Spider), both released to mixed reactions. Both of them are very loose adaptations of the books, with Along Came a Spider changing many of the plot's elements, while Kiss the Girls changes nearly the entire story's plot, except for the fact that Alex's niece is kidnapped and its primary antagonist is Casanova. A significant change upon the books in the movies is that John Sampson is not white but African-American, like Alex himself. Kyle Craig is briefly seen in Kiss the Girls. Along Came a Spider's adaptation was also changed with the film taking out major plot elements or changing them. For instance, Jezzie Flannagan and Alex Cross are dating in the book, but are described as only friends in the film. Also, the most important changed elements is Gary Soneji dies, which would therefore erase him from any future adaptation of Cat and Mouse, nor does Soneji escape from prison, nor is the trial in court seen or mentioned in the film. A third film was proposed. Pop Goes the Weasel was considered, and a script based on Roses are Red was written, but after Along Came a Spider was panned at the box office, the plans were canceled.

Many years after Along Came a Spider's release, a reboot was revealed to be in the works, set for a 2011 release date. Idris Elba was attached to the film as the role of Alex Cross. It was rumored to be based on I, Alex Cross, but director Rob Cohen denied this, revealing he only titled the film like such so as to tell fans: "their hero was back"; to avoid confusion the film's name was changed to Alex Cross with Tyler Perry replacing Elba. Edward Burns and Matthew Fox were later confirmed to star as Cross's partner, Tommy Kane, and the main antagonist, Picasso. The film was later confirmed to be based on the 12th book in the series, Cross. The film was released on October 19, 2012, to mixed to negative reviews. The film was a minor box office bomb, grossing $34 million against its $35 million budget. Matthew Fox and Tyler Perry were praised for their roles in the film.

A sequel based on Double Cross was in discussion in 2012. Perry was confirmed to reprise his role. However, the film was cancelled after Alex Cross did not perform well at the box office.

== Television series ==
Amazon Studios ordered a television series adaptation titled Cross. Aldis Hodge stars and Ben Watkins serves as showrunner from Paramount Television Studios and Skydance Television. It was released on November 14, 2024.

== Release ==
The book series have been released in paperback and hardcover, while it can be listened to on audio book or excerpts from the series can be read online at the official JamesPatterson.com website or others.

== Critical reception ==
The series has been given mixed to positive reviews, with the exception of the 18th book Kill Alex Cross, which has been given mixed to negative reviews, and Cross Country, which received mixed reviews. Many have criticized Kill Alex Cross while few have given it positive reviews. So far, the most positively-received book is either Double Cross or I, Alex Cross. The series has at numerous times been on the New York Times Bestseller list for several weeks. Double Cross was on the New York Times Bestseller list (at number 1) for numerous weeks before being eventually surpassed.

The film series, however, did not fare well, with all three films garnering a negative reception. The most recent film, Alex Cross, received poor reviews and had an underwhelming performance at the box office. Kiss the Girls was the best-received film in the series.
