= Along Came a Spider (film) =

2001 film by Lee Tamahori

- Theatrical release poster
- Directed by: Lee Tamahori
- Screenplay by: Marc Moss
- Based on: Along Came a Spider by James Patterson
- Produced by: David Brown; Joe Wizan; Morgan Freeman
- Starring: Morgan Freeman; Monica Potter; Michael Wincott; Penelope Ann Miller; Michael Moriarty
- Cinematography: Matthew F. Leonetti
- Edited by: Neil Travis
- Music by: Jerry Goldsmith
- Production companies: Phase 1 Productions; Revelations Entertainment
- Distributed by: Paramount Pictures
- Release date: April 6, 2001
- Running time: 103 minutes
- Country: United States
- Language: English
- Budget: $60 million
- Box office: $105.2 million

Along Came a Spider is a 2001 American thriller film directed by Lee Tamahori. It is the second installment in the Alex Cross film series and a sequel to the 1997 film Kiss the Girls, with Morgan Freeman and Jay O. Sanders reprising their roles as detective Alex Cross and FBI agent Kyle Craig. The screenplay by Marc Moss was adapted from the 1993 novel by James Patterson. It received negative reviews on Rotten Tomatoes and mixed reviews on Metacritic, but was a box office success, grossing $105.2 million worldwide against a $60 million budget.

== Plot ==
After Washington, D.C. detective, forensic psychologist and author Dr. Alex Cross loses control of a sting operation resulting in his partner Tracie Fisher's death, he retires from the police force. His departure is short-lived when Megan Rose, the daughter of a US senator, is kidnapped from her private school by a man named Gary Soneji, who has disguised himself as one of her teachers for years. US Secret Service Special Agent Jezzie Flannigan is held responsible for the breach in security that allowed Soneji to take the girl. In response, Cross and Flannigan join forces to track down Soneji and find Megan.

After Cross receives a phone call from Soneji, he finds a small sneaker belonging to Megan in his mailbox. Cross realizes that Soneji is trying to emulate the 1932 Charles A. Lindbergh Jr. kidnapping, a crime so infamous that it became known as the Crime of the Century. With the knowledge that Soneji is trying to make a name for himself similar to Richard Hauptmann, Cross is even more determined to bring him to justice and get Megan back safely, which he posits is a storyline worthy of one of his true crime books.

Despite Soneji's now-public identity, the FBI is unable to capture him until Cross secretly tracks his calls and locations. Unknown to Cross and Flannigan, Soneji's abduction of Megan is only a small part of his elaborate plan to secure greater fame. His coordinated kidnap plot is revealed to center around the son of the President of Russia, Dimitri Starodubov. Soneji attempts to capture the young boy despite the protection provided by police and security guards.

However, before he is able to kidnap Starodubov, Cross and Flannigan block Soneji from abducting the boy. In desperation, Soneji sends Cross a ransom demand asking for $10 million in diamonds from the president. If he fails to comply, Soneji will have no further reason to reach an agreement, and Megan will be killed. Believing there is no other recourse, Cross complies by following a set of directions to a number of public phone-booths spread out throughout the city, where he collects further instructions. Cross eventually delivers the diamonds by throwing them off a moving train to a man in black.

Soneji arrives at Flannigan's home to kidnap her and use her as ransom. However, after arriving and disabling her with a taser, Soneji finds Cross present, who challenges him about the ransom. Cross comments on Soneji receiving $12 million in ransom, to which Soneji does not react. He realizes that Soneji is unaware of the ransom and, when Soneji attempts to escape, Cross shoots him dead.

Upon further investigation, Cross realizes that Flannigan had known about Soneji for some time and had used him as a pawn in her own plot to collect a ransom from Megan's family. She and fellow agent Ben Devine had been slowly gathering Soneji's information to use when the time was right. Cross accesses Flannigan's personal computer, which contains all the details of the Soneji plot leading up to the kidnapping of Megan. This includes the attempted kidnapping of Dmitri, including his information, timelines, and plans.

Cross tracks Flannigan to a secluded farmhouse. She has murdered Devine and is now intent on killing Megan. Cross takes her out with a single shot, saving Megan, before happily returning the girl to her parents.

== Cast ==
- Morgan Freeman as Dr. Alex Cross
- Monica Potter as Secret Service Agent Jezzie Flannigan
- Michael Wincott as Gary Soneji / Jonathan Mercusio
- Penelope Ann Miller as Elizabeth Rose
- Dylan Baker as FBI Special Agent-In-Charge Ollie McArthur
- Michael Moriarty as Senator Hank Rose, Elizabeth's husband
- Mika Boorem as Megan Ann Rose, Elizabeth & Hank's daughter
- Jay O. Sanders as FBI Agent Kyle Craig
- Billy Burke as Secret Service Agent Ben Devine
- Anton Yelchin as Dimitri Starodubov
- Kim Hawthorne as FBI Agent Hickley
- Anna Maria Horsford as Vickie Cross
- Christopher Shyer as Jim Gelway
- Jill Teed as Detective Tracie Fisher
- Samantha Ferris as Mrs. Hume
- Ocean Hellman as Amy Masterson
- Tom McBeath as Chief Cabell
- Aaron Joseph as Kennedy
- Ravil Isyanov as Russian Secret Service Agent Lermontov
- Campbell Lane as Mathias

== Reception ==
=== Box office ===
Box office receipts totaled US$105.2 million, of which $74.1 million was from the United States having earned US$16.7 million in its opening weekend at 2,530 theaters.

=== Critical response ===
On Rotten Tomatoes, the film has an approval rating of 32% based on reviews from 124 critics. The site's critics consensus is: "Derivative and contains too many implausible situations". Metacritic, which uses a weighted average, assigned the film a score of 42 out of 100, based on 31 critics, indicating "mixed or average" reviews.

Elvis Mitchell of The New York Times called the film an "overplotted, hollow thriller" with too much exposition. He praised Freeman, whose "prickly smarts and silken impatience" made the film better. However, he felt Freeman was ultimately wasted in "almost an inept thriller".

Roger Ebert of the Chicago Sun-Times gave the film 2 out of 4 stars, calling it "loophole-riddled, verging on the nonsensical". Though he criticized the plot holes, Ebert thought that Freeman's performance was commendable and suggested awards should perhaps focus more on poor films that had excellent performances.

Robert Koehler of Variety felt that Cross's intelligence and detective skills were "reduced here to the most fundamental and predictable level", though he also praised Freeman's gravitas.

=== Accolades ===
Jerry Goldsmith won the BMI Film & TV Award for his original score, and Morgan Freeman was nominated for the NAACP Image Award for Outstanding Actor in a Motion Picture, but lost to Denzel Washington for Training Day.

== Series reboot ==
There were no further sequels, but the character of Alex Cross was rebooted with a 2012 film adaptation of the novel Cross under the title Alex Cross starring Tyler Perry in the titular role.

== See also ==
- List of American films of 2001
- Cultural depictions of spiders
