= Cross the Line (novel) =

2016 novel by James Patterson

- Author: James Patterson
- Language: English
- Genre: Thriller, mystery, suspense
- Publisher: Little, Brown and Company
- Publication date: November 21, 2016
- Publication place: United States
- Media type: Print (hardback, paperback), e-book, audiobook
- Pages: 432
- ISBN: 9780316407168

Cross the Line is the 24th installment in the popular Alex Cross series by James Patterson. The novel, set against the backdrop of Washington, D.C., dives into a series of intense events triggered by the death of a high-profile police official, prompting a citywide crisis. Cross the Line is a crime thriller that combines elements of suspense and action, while also exploring themes related to justice, morality, and the psychological underpinnings of criminal behavior. Patterson structures the novel to maintain a pace that keeps the reader engaged, with the narrative unfolding from multiple perspectives, adding depth to the characters and the storyline.

== Plot ==
The story unfolds in Washington D.C., focusing on Alex Cross, a detective known for his dedication to his profession and family. The narrative begins with a series of unsettling events in the city, including the death of a local official following a high-speed chase and shootout, and the subsequent murders of several police officers. Alex Cross, along with his wife Bree Stone, who is the chief of detectives, becomes deeply involved in the investigation. The perpetrator, referred to as the "Trigger Man," appears to target members of the police force specifically. The investigation reveals that the crimes are not only brutal but also bear signs of personal vendetta, indicating that the killer harbors a deep-seated grudge against law enforcement.

As the story progresses, the narrative occasionally shifts to the perspective of the killer, providing a glimpse into the motivations and mindset behind the crimes. The background of the killer is gradually revealed, shedding light on a complex interplay of past trauma and distorted notions of justice. The plot intensifies as Cross and Stone delve deeper into the case, navigating through dangerous territory both in the physical sense and in terms of the psychological challenges posed by the cunning adversary. The culmination of the novel brings high-tension action and revelations, with Cross leveraging his expertise and instincts to confront the killer and prevent further tragedies.

As Alex Cross pursues an adversary who has appointed himself as judge, jury, and executioner, he is forced to take the law into his own hands. The stakes are high as he works to prevent the city he's sworn to protect from descending into complete chaos.

== Publication ==
James Patterson's Cross the Line was released on November 21, 2016, by Little, Brown and Company, and available in hardcover, paperback, e-book, and audiobook formats.

== Reception ==
The book was well received by fans of the series, with readers praising its fast-paced action and the intricate case that challenges Alex Cross and his team. The inclusion of personal elements, particularly the dynamics within the Cross family, adds depth to the character of Alex Cross and enriches the narrative. The critic reviews for Cross the Line by James Patterson highlight the book's engaging nature and its contribution to keeping the series invigorated. "Bookreporter" notes that Patterson continues to refresh the long-standing Alex Cross series by subjecting the iconic protagonist to various challenges and introducing compelling antagonists. The review acknowledges Patterson's skill in maintaining the series' appeal over a considerable duration. "Writers Write" describes Cross the Line as a fast-paced thriller that is hard to put down, praising Patterson's proficiency in crafting an engaging narrative. The review appreciates the story's pacing and the intense plot revolving around Alex Cross's efforts to solve the Chief of Police's murder. These reviews suggest that Cross the Line is a prominent installment in the Alex Cross series, maintaining the high standards and captivating storytelling that readers expect from James Patterson's works.
