= Target: Alex Cross =

Novel by James Patterson

- First edition
- Author: James Patterson
- Language: English
- Series: Alex Cross (novel series)
- Genre: Adventure novel
- Publisher: Little, Brown and Company
- Publication date: Nov. 19, 2018
- Publication place: United States
- Media type: Print (hardcover)
- Pages: 432 pp (first edition, hardcover)
- ISBN: 0316273945
- Preceded by: The People vs. Alex Cross (2017)

Target: Alex Cross is the twenty-fourth novel in the Alex Cross series.

== Plot ==
Someone is killing the nation's political leaders. Alex Cross is now on assignment to the FBI and his wife, Bree Stone, is now the chief of detectives for the DC Police. Alex and a team of FBI agents, as well as Bree and the Secret Service must find who is behind the killings and why. Before all the mayhem is done, the new president and many in line to succession to the Presidency have been felled. The plot is discovered and when it is, those who solved this case are truly shocked at who was behind this and why.

== Characters ==
- Alex Cross: Former lead investigator for the DC Metropolitan area. Alex is responsible for solving the assassinations, and is the protagonist of the novel.
- Bree Stone: Wife of Alex cross and current lead investigator in the DC Metropolitan area.
- Damon, Ali, Nana Mama: The Cross family members who play a minor role.
- President Grant: U.S. President who was dead at the beginning of the novel.
- Sean Lawlor: One of many professional assassins in the novel.
- U.S. Senator Betsy Walker: A U.S. Senator who was living in the DC Metropolitan area.
- Ned Mahoney: FBI special agent, and accompanies Alex Cross throughout the novel.
- Agent Reamer: Secret Service member
- President Hobb: U.S. Vice-President at the beginning of the novel.
- Sally Burton: Chief FBI Criminologist
- Nina Davis: Alex Cross's interesting patient throughout the novel.
- Kristina Varjan: One of many professional assassins in the novel.
- Piotr: Unknown identity who coordinates the assassinations.
- Pablo Cruz: One of many professional assassins in the novel.
- Romero and Gang: Ties with the Mexican Drug Cartel
- Mr. Kasimov: Russian diplomat who was believed to be involved with the assassinations.
- President Larkin: U.S. Attorney General at the beginning of the novel.

== Reviews ==
A review in Book Reporter was positive. The review said, "Those who have strayed from the series recently for whatever reason, thriller fans who have never read an Alex Cross novel, and readers who have been on the train from the beginning of the series will find much to love here." This book, when it was first published, was touted in USA Today as a book readers would not want to miss.
