= Cross Justice =

Book by James Patterson

- First edition
- Author: James Patterson
- Language: American English
- Series: Alex Cross series
- Genre: Thriller novel
- Publisher: Little, Brown and Co.
- Publication date: November 23, 2015
- Publication place: United States
- Media type: Print (hardcover)
- Pages: 448 pp (first edition, hardcover)
- ISBN: 0316407046 (for first hardcover edition)
- Preceded by: Hope to Die (2015)
- Followed by: Cross the Line (2016)

Cross Justice is the 23rd book of the Alex Cross series, written by James Patterson.

== Plot ==
Alex Cross and his family, who live in Washington, D.C., travel to Starksville, North Carolina, so Alex and his wife Bree can help clear Alex's cousin Stefan Tate of a murder they suspect he did not commit. Stefan, a school teacher, is on trial for supposedly murdering Rashawn Turnbull, a boy in his class, and almost everyone in town is convinced he's guilty and wants him to hang. Alex has not been to Starksville since leaving as a child thirty-five years ago. The Cross family has not found the town to be welcoming to them, partly because they are there to help clear Stefan.

Alex travels to Belle Glade, Florida, to get information on his father, who was said to have committed suicide near there. He meets a veteran Palm Beach County, Florida, sergeant, who is convinced Alex can help him catch a brutal serial killer in Palm Beach County. It turns out that the sergeant is Alex's long-lost father Jason. Meanwhile, Alex looks into Marvin Bell, a local businessman who has had dubious influence on the Cross family during Alex's childhood and is said to have orchestrated Jason Cross's fake death.

After investigation, it turns out that Bell teamed up with Rashawn's maternal grandparents to ship a highly potent addictive drug across the South and were making large profits off of this drug. Rashawn's grandfather had killed Rashawn due to feeling shameful about the child's mixed heritage, then pinned it on Stefan since the latter had been investigating into the Starksville drug trade. It is also discovered that the entire judicial system of Starksville had been under FBI investigation for corruption. Following the incident, the FBI moves in and arrests all the judges in Starksville, with Stefan's case being dropped.

== Reception ==
A positive review in The Huffington Post said, "If you have been a die hard Alex Cross fan then you will slurp this one up like gravy. It has all the things you like about the characters and Patterson's writing. The fact it is all just too much to be believed shouldn’t slow you down a bit." A review in Book Reporter was also very positive, saying, "Even if you have never read any books in this series, you need to sink your teeth into CROSS JUSTICE now."

A professional review by The Writer's Inkwell gave the book three out of five stars; the last line of the review said, "I still feel the time may have come to say goodbye to Alex Cross."
