= Cross (novel) =

Novel by James Patterson

- Author: James Patterson
- Language: English
- Series: Alex Cross
- Genre: Crime, mystery, thriller
- Publisher: Little, Brown
- Publication date: November 13, 2006
- Publication place: United States
- Media type: Print (hardcover)
- Pages: 393 pp (first edition, hardback)
- ISBN: 0-316-15979-4 (first edition, hardback)
- OCLC: 67375102
- Dewey Decimal: 813/.54
- LC Class: PS3566.A822 C76 2006
- Preceded by: Mary, Mary
- Followed by: Double Cross

Cross is James Patterson's 12th novel featuring his most famous character, Alex Cross. It was released in 2006. This novel was also released in some markets under the title Alex Cross.

The 2012 film Alex Cross starring Tyler Perry was largely based on the novel Cross. This book is followed by Double Cross.

== Plot summary ==
Alex Cross's former partner, John Sampson, asks him to investigate the case of a serial rapist in Georgetown with similarities to a case they worked on together before. The case ends up having a connection to the death of Cross's wife, Maria.

== Characters ==
- Alex Cross

Patterson portrays him as a lonely person but also as a model father who tries to spend as much time as possible with his family.

- Nana Mama

Her real name is Regina Hope Cross and she is Alex's grandmother who looked after him when he grew up. She is 81 years old and still lives with Alex and his three children in Washington DC. Nana used to work as an English teacher and as an assistant principal at Garfield North Junior High School in Washington. She is quite severe and manners are very important for her. She helped take care of Alex and his kids after Maria died.

- Maria Simpson Cross (flashback)

Alex's deceased wife, whom we briefly meet in the opening chapters of the story. She is shown in a flashback in the very beginning of the story and also in another mini-flashback in the middle of the story. Maria was a kind, gentle, and loving woman. She is the mother of Janelle and Damon, who she loved with all of her heart. She was even pregnant with her and Alex's third child. She loved Alex very much, even telling him this just before she died.

- John Sampson

In the novel, it is revealed that John killed Maria's real murderer, Jimmy "Hats" Galati, along with the help of a fellow detective named Rakeem Powell, in New York City. John and Rakeem covered up the murder, so that no one would find out. When John reveals this to Alex, it helps strengthens their friendship and the two decide to keep the truth buried.

- Kayla Coles

Kayla is a resident physician at a local hospital in Southeast Washington, D.C., and also Alex's girlfriend in the novel. She was introduced in Four Blind Mice and appears all the way to Cross, during which, she and Alex form an attraction to each other and later start dating in Mary Mary. Kayla has romantic feelings for Alex and enjoys being with him.

During the story, she is stabbed by a junkie and is taken to the hospital, where Alex comforts her. While visiting her parents in her hometown of North Carolina, Kayla decides to move back there, finding that she can do more good there and later tells Alex, who is sadden by this but supports her. By the end of the novel, Kayla tries to convince Alex to move with her, showing that she still wants a relationship with him, but Alex refuses, believing that he can never leave Washington behind. Kayla and Alex decide to end their relationship, which saddens them both, and they go their separate ways.

- Michael "The Butcher of Sligo" Sullivan

Michael Sullivan grew up in Brooklyn, New York. He had no good childhood and often had problems with his father, who bullied him. So at the age of eighteen, he killed him before dismembering him using a scalpel and feeding him to the fish in the bay. Some time later he got connections to Mafia, especially the Maggione family, for which he worked as a killer. After one of his jobs, he got the nickname "the Butcher" due to his cruelness and often killing his victims in a brutal way. After killing his victims he would cut up their faces with a scalpel to make a point and take pictures to use a threatening devise so his next victims would keep quiet. Somewhere along the line, Michael started raping young, attractive women and would often leave them alive, showing them the same pictures to keep them quiet. He is believed to be the one who killed Maria, but is proven innocent as it was his former partner Jimmy "Hats" Galati who killed her. By the end of the novel, Michael is killed by Alex. He has a wife and three sons, and also has a home in Maryland.

- Jimmy "Hats" Galati

Jimmy is The Butcher's partner in crime and turns out to be the killer of Maria. He was killed by Sampson and another detective named Rakeem Powell, years ago. It was never revealed to Alex that Jimmy had murdered his wife until the end of the novel, where John comes clean after they kill Michael "The Butcher" Sullivan, Jimmy's old partner. "Jimmy was known as "Jimmy the Protector" because he had the Butcher's back. Always." The beginning flashback was the only appearance throughout the series that Jimmy ever made, but he is mentioned dozens of times. Originally, The Butcher thinks one of his mob bosses killed Hats, but it is later revealed that Sampson killed him.

== Film adaptation ==
A film adaptation of the novel, titled Alex Cross, was released on October 19, 2012. The film stars Tyler Perry as the title character and Matthew Fox as The Butcher/Picasso.

The novel and the movie don't have much relation to each other, and the screenplay borrows elements from other parts of the Alex Cross stories, blending them together out-of-sequence, and making up other sections completely. For instance, Cross and his family lived in the Southeast section of Washington DC, not Detroit. Damon is the eldest child, not Janelle who was still a baby when Maria was killed in a drive-by (not by a sniper). Alex's partner and best friend is John Sampson, a black man bigger even than Cross.

Patterson implies in the on-disc interviews that this Alex Cross movie should be considered as a reboot of the franchise and is meant to continue through to the current novels. He also said that, although he loved Morgan Freeman in the first two movies, Along Came a Spider and Kiss the Girls, Tyler Perry is closer, physically and artistically, to his own internal conception of what Dr. Cross is like.
