= Pop Goes the Weasel (novel) =

1999 book by James Patterson

- Author: James Patterson
- Publisher: Little, Brown and Company
- Publication date: 1999
- Pages: 432
- ISBN: 0316693286
- Preceded by: Cat and Mouse
- Followed by: Roses Are Red

Pop Goes the Weasel (1999) is the fifth novel in the Alex Cross series written by James Patterson.

== Plot ==
The book begins by introducing the villain, Geoffrey Shafer. He is a well-dressed and wealthy man who lives in Kalorama, Washington, D.C., and drives a Jaguar XJ12. In the beginning, he rushes into oncoming traffic causing a commotion, before a police officer pulls him over and asks him for some identification. This is when the reader finds out he is a British Diplomat who has diplomatic immunity.

As Geoffrey feels he is losing control, he decides to play a fantasy game called the Four Horsemen, in which he takes on the character of Death. As the game begins, he drives to the red light district, picks up a prostitute and e-mails the other Horsemen.

== Characters ==
- Alex Cross
- John Sampson
- Christine Johnson
- Nana Mama

=== The Four Horsemen ===
- Geoffrey Shafer (The Weasel) – Death. The main villain in the book.
- Oliver Highsmith – Conqueror. The game was originally his idea. He was in charge of the other 3 when they were stationed in Bangkok.
- George Bayer – Famine.
- James Whitehead – War. War Recruited Shafer into MI6. Whitehead reported to Highsmith.

All four of them killed people in their area, but Shafer was more out of control. During their time in Bangkok they all murdered prostitutes.

== Critical reception ==
Kirkus Reviews said Pop Goes the Weasel was a suspenseful novel that hinted towards a sequel. Emily Melton of Booklist wrote, "After more than 400 pages of high-octane action, Patterson serves up a shocker of a finish that will have readers checking their locks twice." Library Journal's Jeff Ayers praised the book, stating, "Even with implausible situations and an absurdly evil villain, the book is impossible to put down."

Publishers Weekly praised the book, writing, "Even the disappearance of Cross's new lady love (his wife was killed in a previous book) is less of a cliched device than a ritual sacrifice as Patterson's well-oiled suspense machine grinds away with solid precision." In a negative review, Sun Sentinel mystery columnist Oline H. Cogdill wrote, "In his seventh novel featuring Cross, the best-selling author suspends suspense for an amateurish story that spirals downward into an ending that is as insipid as it is preposterous. Pop Goes the Weasel holds no secrets in reserve as each twist and plot movement are doltishly transparent." San Francisco Examiner's Bobbie Hess called the novel "well-paced with believable dialogue", deeming it "a worthy addition to the Cross saga".

== Audiobook adaptation ==
An audiobook adaptation of the book was released in 1999. It was narrated by Keith David and Roger Rees, who depicted the characters Alex Cross and Geoffrey Shafer, respectively. The adaptation had six hours of audio in four cassettes.
