= Alex Cross's Trial =

2009 novel by James Patterson and Richard DiLallo

- First edition
- Author: James Patterson and Richard DiLallo
- Language: English
- Series: Alex Cross
- Genre: Crime, mystery, thriller
- Publisher: Little, Brown
- Publication date: August 24, 2009
- Publication place: United States of America
- Pages: 380format = Hardcover 400pp
- Preceded by: Cross Country
- Followed by: I, Alex Cross

Alex Cross's Trial is the 15th novel in James Patterson's Alex Cross series. It follows Cross Country in the series, and comes before his novel I, Alex Cross. It is written by Patterson and Richard DiLallo, and its premise is that it is a book written by Alex Cross.

== Plot ==
From his grandmother, Nana Mama, Alex Cross has been told the story of his great-uncle Abraham and his struggle throughout the era of the Ku Klux Klan. Alex then recounts this tale to his children through his novel called Trial. A lawyer at the turn of the century, a man named Ben Corbett, represents the toughest cases. Many of his cases are opposing racism and oppression, and because of the cases he's fighting for, he risks the life of his wife and children. When President Roosevelt asks Ben personally to go to his hometown to investigate upon rumors of the Ku Klux Klan's resurgence, he cannot refuse. Upon entering Eudora, Mississippi, Corbett meets Abraham Cross and his enchanting granddaughter Moody. He enlists their help and the two Crosses introduce Corbett to the other side of the idyllic southern town. Lynchings have become commonplace in the town, and the black residents of the town live in constant fear. Ben aims to break the reign of terror, but finding out who is behind it all may break his heart.
