= Cross My Heart (novel) =

2013 novel by James Patterson

- Author: James Patterson
- Series: Alex Cross
- Genre: Crime, mystery, thriller
- Published: November 25, 2013; Little, Brown
- Publication place: United States
- Pages: 448
- ISBN: 978-0316407045
- Preceded by: Alex Cross, Run
- Followed by: Hope to Die

Cross My Heart is the 21st novel in the Alex Cross series written by author James Patterson. The novel takes place after Alex Cross, Run, in which Alex tries contemplating a life outside the Metro Police after the apparent death of Ava, an orphan girl they took in. Cross My Heart was released 20 years after the original novel, Along Came a Spider. The novel's events, having ended on a cliffhanger, are continued in the next novel, Hope to Die.

== Plot ==
Alex Cross has been a family man at heart—he loves his children, his grandmother, and his beautiful wife Brianna. Alex Cross has managed to stop serial killers and survive. But all of that is about to change, when a new enemy targets Cross and his family. Cross finds himself in a whole new game. If he tries to save his family or stop the killer, they die. Can Alex protect his family and capture a criminal at the same time?

== Character list ==
- Alex Cross, the series' protagonist who often deals with extreme murder cases, and has an overwhelming reputation for solving crimes. Cross is described as a family man, who is also dedicated to his job and struggles keeping them balanced.
- John Sampson, Cross' best friend and fellow Metro cop. Sampson and Cross have been friends since they were children. He is married to his wife Billie, and is six foot seven and a half feet tall.
- Brianna Stone-Cross, Cross' wife and Metro-police cop. She takes care of Cross' grandma and kids as if they were her own family. She is described as caring and gentle, but also a "stone" when it comes to police duty.
- Nana Mama, who is still grieving over the death of Ava Williams, a girl whom they adopted in Kill Alex Cross, and died in Alex Cross, Run. She is Alex's grandmother, who took care of him after his parents' death.
- Damon, Janelle, and Ali Cross, Alex's children
- Ava
- Marcus Sunday/Thierry Mulch, the villain of the novel

== Release ==
The novel was released on November 25, 2013, in hardcover and audio book, with the paperback to be released on September 30, 2014. The release coincides with the 20th anniversary of the original novel in the series.

== Critical reception ==
The novel received mostly positive reviews. Author of the Jack Reacher series, Lee Child, gave the novel a positive review, stating that "Behind all the noise and numbers, we shouldn't forget that no one gets this big without natural storytelling talent—which is what James Patterson has, in spades. The Alex Cross series proves that."
