= Alex Cross (film) =

- Theatrical release poster
- Directed by: Rob Cohen
- Screenplay by: Marc Moss; Kerry Williamson
- Based on: Cross by James Patterson
- Produced by: Bill Block; Steve Bowen; Randall Emmett; Leopoldo Gout; Paul Hanson; James Patterson
- Starring: Tyler Perry; Matthew Fox; Edward Burns; Rachel Nichols; Cicely Tyson; Carmen Ejogo; Giancarlo Esposito; John C. McGinley; Stephanie Jacobsen; Werner Daehn; Jean Reno
- Cinematography: Ricardo Della Rosa
- Edited by: Matt Diezel; Thom Noble
- Music by: John Debney
- Production companies: Block/Hanson; Emmett/Furla Films; Envision Entertainment Corporation; IAC Productions; James Patterson Entertainment
- Distributed by: Summit Entertainment (through Lionsgate, United States); QED International (Overseas)
- Release date: October 19, 2012
- Running time: 101 minutes
- Country: United States
- Language: English
- Budget: $35 million
- Box office: $34.6 million

Alex Cross is a 2012 American action thriller film directed by Rob Cohen, and starring Tyler Perry as the title character, and Matthew Fox as the villain Picasso. The adapted screenplay was written by Marc Moss and Kerry Williamson. It is based on the 2006 novel Cross by James Patterson. It is the third installment of the Alex Cross film series, and was considered a reboot of the series.

Unlike the previous films, which were distributed by Paramount Pictures, the film was released by Summit Entertainment on October 19, 2012. It was panned by critics and earned $34.6 million on a $35 million budget. A planned sequel was cancelled.

== Plot ==
Psychologist Detective Dr. Alex Cross is working as a detective for the Detroit Police Department together with his childhood friend, Thomas Kane, and Monica Ashe. Outside of work, Alex lives a happy suburban life with his mother, his pregnant wife, and their two kids. Thomas and Ashe are romantically involved with each other but try in vain to keep this a secret from Alex.

One night, Alex and Thomas are called to investigate the torture and murder of a businesswoman named Fan Yau. Alex determines from the clues in the crime scene that this was done by a single person, and Thomas notes that this must be the work of a professional, former special forces officer. They also find a charcoal drawing of Fan Yau's death in the room, which leads them to dub the killer as "Picasso".

Alex’s team eventually link Fan Yau with two other businessmen: Erich Nunemaker and Giles Mercier. This, together with the letters E and N found in the charcoal drawing, lead the team to believe that Picasso will attack Nunemaker next, with Mercier being the likely final target. Alex, Thomas, and Ashe arrive at Nunemaker's building and are able to prevent his assassination. However, in the firefight that ensues, Picasso is able to identify the composition of their team. Picasso is also able to escape despite being hit by Thomas in the shoulder.

Worried for their safety, Thomas asks Alex if he thinks Picasso will now attack them and their loved ones. Alex reassures him that he believes Picasso is a professional with narrow focus, and thus would not deviate from his list of targets. This assessment would be proven to be incorrect as Picasso immediately plots his revenge against the team.

Alex and his wife, Maria, are out for dinner to celebrate the conception of their third child. Alex says that he is considering taking a job with the FBI as it has better hours, pay, and benefits, and it would mean more time for his family. Maria is reluctant because taking the FBI job would mean moving to Washington D.C. and her career is based in Detroit. Their discussion is interrupted when Picasso calls Alex’s phone using Ashe's number. Picasso sends a picture of Ashe, whom he tortured and killed, to Alex. Alex attempts to prod and profile Picasso by taunting him and asking questions. Enraged, Picasso, who has had a sniper rifle trained on Alex all along, decides that the best way to take revenge on Alex would be to kill his wife. He shoots Maria in the chest and she dies in Alex’s arms.

Alex and Thomas, reeling from the losses in their personal lives, make it their personal crusade to bring Picasso to justice, through whatever means. They track down the chemist who supplied Picasso with the drug used on both Fan Yau and Ashe and are able to pinpoint his location. Alex and Thomas rush towards Picasso's known location when they realize that he is going to assassinate Giles Mercier. Picasso is able to launch an RPG towards Mercier's convoy, apparently killing him. The pair pursue Picasso and eventually catch up to him. Alex and Picasso fight in the rafters of a church, where Picasso falls to his death, but not before telling Alex that he made him who he is today.

Alex deduces that Mercier is in fact alive and has been behind the attacks all along. Mercier hired Picasso to fake his death using a man named Cloche in order to escape entanglements with the German government. While Mercier is hiding out in Indonesia, Alex calls him and informs him that his assistant has sold him out for immunity. The local cops converge to arrest him for drug smuggling charges, which is punishable by death in Indonesia. Satisfied that justice had been served, Alex and Thomas both express their intent to work together at the FBI.

== Cast ==
- Tyler Perry as Detective Dr. Alex Cross
- Matthew Fox as "The Butcher of Sligo" / "Picasso"
- Edward Burns as Detective Tommy Kane, Detective Dr. Cross' childhood friend
- Rachel Nichols as Detective Monica Ashe
- Cicely Tyson as Regina "Nana Mama" Cross, Detective Dr. Cross' paternal grandmother
- Carmen Ejogo as Maria Cross, Detective Dr. Cross' wife
- Giancarlo Esposito as Daramus Holiday
- John C. McGinley as Chief Richard Brookwell
- Jean Reno as Giles Mercier
- Stephanie Jacobsen as Fan Yau Lee
- Werner Daehn as Erich Nunemacher
- Yara Shahidi as Janelle Cross, Detective Dr. Cross & Maria's daughter
- Sayeed Shahidi as Damon Cross, Detective Dr. Cross & Maria's son
- Bonnie Bentley as Detective Jody "Kleb" Klebanoff
- Ingo Rademacher as Ingo Sacks

== Production ==
A reboot film about Alex Cross' character began development in 2010, with a screenplay by Kerry Williamson and James Patterson. David Twohy was attached as director, and was set to rewrite the screenplay. In August, Idris Elba was cast as Cross.

Towards the end of 2010, QED International purchased the rights, and initial screenplay by Williamson and Patterson. By January 2011, Tyler Perry had replaced Elba in the starring role, and Cohen was hired as director. The production company, QED, set Marc Moss, who worked on the previous Alex Cross films, to refine the screenplay for Perry and Cohen. With a production budget of $35 million, filming began on August 8 in Cleveland, Ohio and lasted until September 16. Filming locations in northeast Ohio served as a backdrop to Detroit, Michigan, where the character works for the Detroit Police Department. After Ohio, filming also took place in Detroit itself for two weeks. The production office remained in Cleveland throughout production inside an empty portion of the old American Greetings Company Factory.

Summit Entertainment purchased domestic distribution rights in March 2011, and set the release date for October 26, 2012.

The theatrical release poster featured the tagline, "Don't ever cross Alex Cross." The Playlist at indieWire was critical of the tagline, saying that "it'll be impressive if anything dumber appears on a movie poster this year".

== Reception ==
=== Box office ===
The film opened in 2,539 theaters in North America, grossing $11,396,768 during its first weekend, with an average of $4,489 per theater, and ranking #5 at the box office. The film ultimately earned $25,888,412 domestically and $8,730,455 internationally, for a total of $34,618,867, on a $35 million production budget.

=== Critical response ===
On the review aggregator website Rotten Tomatoes, 11% of 127 critics' reviews are positive, with an average rating of 3.6/10. The website's consensus reads: "Tyler Perry and Matthew Fox did their best, but they're trampled by Rob Cohen's frustrating direction and a tasteless, lazily written screenplay." Metacritic, which uses a weighted average, assigned the film a score of 30 out of 100, based on 34 critics, indicating "generally unfavorable" reviews. Audiences polled by CinemaScore gave the film an average grade of A on an A+ to F scale. Roger Ebert gave the film 2 stars out of 4.

The film earned a Razzie Award nomination for Perry as Worst Actor.

== Cancelled sequel ==
Prior to the film's release, Double Cross was scheduled to be adapted into a film, with Perry reprising his role, but the sequel was cancelled following the critical and commercial failure of Alex Cross.
