= Merry Christmas, Alex Cross =

2012 novel by James Patterson

- First edition
- Author: James Patterson
- Language: English
- Series: Alex Cross series
- Genre: Crime, mystery, thriller
- Publisher: Little, Brown
- Publication date: November 12, 2012
- Publication place: United States
- Media type: Print (hardcover)
- Pages: 400 (hardcover)
- ISBN: 0-316-21068-4
- Preceded by: Kill Alex Cross
- Followed by: Alex Cross, Run

Merry Christmas, Alex Cross is the 19th novel in the Alex Cross series. Detective Alex Cross is called out on Christmas Eve to deal with a hostage situation that has spiraled out of control.

Released on November 12, 2012, the novel was well-received by fans and critics alike. However, its commercial success was somewhat lukewarm in comparison to past installments, peaking at #2 and #3 on the New York Times and USA Today bestsellers lists, respectively.

== Summary ==
On Christmas Eve, Detective Alex Cross is called away from his family - Nana, Bree and his children - first to apprehend a thief robbing his church's poor box , and subsequently to respond to an escalating hostage situation. Forced to draw on his law enforcement training to rescue the captive family, Cross also confronts the return of Hala, the primary antagonist from the previous novel.

== Sequels ==
Merry Christmas, Alex Cross is followed by Alex Cross, Run and Cross My Heart. Alex Cross, Run was released on February 18, 2013 in hardcover, while the paperback edition was released on July 30, 2013. Cross My Heart was released in hardcover and audio on November 25, 2013.

== Release ==
The book is the nineteenth novel of the series, and was released on November 12, 2012. However, in some countries, the book was released in late 2011. The book's first 18 chapters can be read at multiple websites, including Patterson's own website: JamesPatterson.com. The paperback edition of Merry Christmas is expected to be released in 2014.

== Additional notes ==
The book is a direct sequel to Kill Alex Cross, with a similar plot – featuring Hala from the previous installment – but does feature new characters, new elements, and a few other story lines. Subsequently, the book was released to mixed to positive reviews. Many fans were critical of the previous installment but nevertheless, mostly all "loyal" fans read the new "one." The book's sequel, Alex Cross, Run was initially set for a September 2013 release date. However, near the end of 2012 – in December – the book was set for a new release date. Its new release of February 18, 2013 was confirmed by author James Patterson at his own official website. The new book's first two chapters can be read at the official website. The first 20 chapters may be released at Patterson's website as well.

== Critical reception ==
The book has received mixed to positive reviews. Many have criticized its length – 101 pages in paperback. One review stated "Good book, but for no precise villain, it still has potential." The New York Times' reviewer called it "one of the best Christmas books ever! It definitely makes up for its overarching-storyline prequel." James Astrect said, "I'm gonna confess, I hated Kill Alex Cross, but Merry Christmas was astonishing ... I could not stop reading."

Merry Christmas, Alex Cross remained on the New York Times Bestseller List for several weeks, with Diary of a Wimpy Kid: The Third Wheel and The Mark of Athena challenging it for #1.
