= Kill Alex Cross =

2011 novel by James Patterson

- First edition
- Author: James Patterson
- Language: English
- Series: Alex Cross (novel series)
- Genre: Crime, Mystery
- Published: November 14, 2011
- Publisher: Little, Brown
- Publication place: United States
- Media type: Print (hardback & paperback)
- Pages: 400 (paperback); 384 (Hardcover)
- Preceded by: Cross Fire
- Followed by: Merry Christmas, Alex Cross

Kill Alex Cross is the 18th novel in the Alex Cross series by James Patterson, following fictional detective Alex Cross as he tries to solve two crimes – one involving the president's kidnapped children and the other a case of someone poisoning the water supply.

== Plot ==
President Coyle's children, Zoe (who is depicted as 'always getting in trouble' or starting it) and Ethan (who is the opposite of his sister, and is often picked on and bullied by fellow students at their middle school), speak to each other alone in a shed, when Secret Service open the door to take them to assembly, they find Zoe and Ethan have been kidnapped. Meanwhile, Metro Police Department cop Alex Cross, along with FBI agents, and Secret Service, discover a vehicle that rushes quickly out of the school grounds. Upon chasing the van, a massive car crash results soon afterward. Alex interrogates the driver, who is badly injured and sent to the hospital. Alex later learns the driver's name to be Pinkey. Meanwhile, FBI agent Ned Mahoney is told by Director Ron Burns that all information must be kept from Metro Police, and others, especially Alex Cross – who is a close friend of Mahoney. Ned feels guilty, and later offers to give info to Alex. Alex later tells his best friend, John Sampson, the case reminds him of the case of Gary Soneji, who was a math teacher that kidnapped two children.

After being sure the FBI is keeping information from him, Alex asks Ned for help, but he refuses, annoying Alex. Alex is later asked to see the president's wife. The First Lady tells Alex she is confident, and hopes, Alex can help rescue her children. She responds by telling Alex about her children. Two messages are given from the kidnapper, one saying "there will be no ransom" nor negotiations. Later, when being called upon by the CIA for a private meeting, he discovers the two messages, and also makes up with Ned. Later, at an FBI meeting, Alex and Ned are shown a video of the Coyle children sedated and sleeping. President Coyle reveals that Al Ayla, otherwise known as "the Family", a group of Saudi people, may have something to do with it. The Family consists of Hala, her husband Tariq, and others. Their first mission, together with another couple, is the poisoning of Washington's water supply. Aware that there is a traitor in the Family they kill the other couple afterwards.

The target of their second attack is the Washington Metro. Hala and Tariq work with a different couple and their two sons but are nearly caught and Hala shoots two cops. After fleeing from the site they are offered a home from Uncle, a member of the Family. The couple with the two sons is later found by the FBI but manage to take their suicide capsules.

Meanwhile, Alex goes to the school and interrogates many, including Zoe's friend, a counselor, the principal, and the male nurse Mr. Glass. The kidnapper is revealed to use a recorder to record his thoughts and feelings on why he did the kidnapping and what outcomes he wishes to have.

Uncle and his wife are later arrested and interrogated. The wife is the FBI's secret informer, and she helps them to arrest several Family members on their next mission. Only Hala and Tariq escape, Tariq being shot in the hand. One of the arrested women finally confirms that the kidnapping of the president's children has most likely nothing to do with the Family.

Nana Mama is kicked down and robbed by a young girl, angering Bree – Alex's wife – who goes looking for the girl. Upon finding her, she brings the girl to Nana to apologize. The girl reveals her name to be Ava and has no parents. Nana and Bree decide to adopt her, against Alex's initial wishes, but he later agrees. Ava is shown to interact with Jannie and Ali, Alex's children, very well.

Alex also learns from the First Lady that Zoe doesn't have a phone, when one of Zoe's friends said she did. Interrogating Zoe's friend, he learns someone used her phone to text Zoe to lure her out of the school – possibly the kidnapper. He asks Ryan, the bully that picks on Ethan (who earlier got into a fight with Zoe and Ethan), about why he texted her a year ago on a field trip. Ryan shows him the message ("I want to cum on your tits.") but also claims someone else wrote it. It seems that the kidnapper uses the phones from different kids to contact Zoe. Alex suspects the killer is the school's janitor after interrogating him, since the janitor runs off. It is later revealed that he's not the kidnapper but has pornographic pictures of children on his computer. Alex later suspects Glass – the school's nurse – is the killer. When asking Glass' wife about Glass, she reveals he wanted to be a doctor, but after the death of their son, Zach, he got mad and blamed everyone for his death. She also reveals that Glass kidnapped her and held her hostage in a basement with food and water. However, he later took her back home, left her, and wrote a message saying "sorry." Since he has lost his own child, Glass probably doesn't want the President to have his. Alex, the FBI, and others watch Glass, who gets away. Alex calls upon Ned's and Sampson's help. The three drug Glass, tricking him into showing them where the Coyle children are being kept. After finding them, Alex arrests Glass. Ron Burns informs Alex that due to a lack of evidence, Glass will be in jail for a couple of days only. The First Lady, Zoe, and Ethan thank Alex and tell him the kidnapper was male and spoke into a recorder. Alex and Sampson find Glass and arrest him again, with the evidence being the recorder found in the glove compartment of his car. Glass tries to get out his gun and is shot by Alex and Sampson in self-defence.

Tariq and Hala are contacted by another man and wife, who bring them to Jibbo which means "Grandfather". He plans on them killing themselves with a suicide capsule, which Tariq takes and dies. Hala, however, feels betrayed by the Family and shoots the man and wife, and kills Jibbo. She flees, deciding to start a new life, not knowing whom she should fight in the future.

At church, the First Lady speaks up about and for Sampson and his wife Billie's idea to open up a new school. The entire Cross family get to meet the First Lady. Meanwhile, President Coyle ponders over Tariq, Jibbo, and other dead bodies. Deciding that the Family has fled, Coyle demands things go back to normal.

== Release ==
The book was released on November 14, 2011, on Paperback and Hardcover in the U.S. Multiple chapters can be read online, including the JamesPatterson official website. It is also available as an Audio Book.

== Critical reception ==
The book has received mixed to negative reviews. One review states: "The book [Kill Alex Cross] is just horrible. Right from the start. The president's kid getting kidnapped? Really? It's been done before. Not to mention, it's subplot – someone's poisoning the city's water supply? It may not be the worst Alex Cross book, but it is one of the most terrible books you will ever read. You'll try to forget about it after reading it." Reception has not all been negative, however, one positive review cited it as: "masterfully done. James Patterson at his best, if the series keeps going like this, I can't wait for the next book!"

== Sequels ==
Despite very negative reviews, the series continued on with the nineteenth book in the series, Merry Christmas, Alex Cross with Run, Alex Cross coming out in 2013.
