= The Big Bad Wolf (novel) =

2003 book by James Patterson

- Author: James Patterson
- Language: English
- Series: Alex Cross
- Genre: Crime, mystery, thriller
- Publisher: Little, Brown and Company
- Publication date: November 17, 2003 (1st ed. hardcover)
- Publication place: United States
- Pages: 390
- ISBN: 978-0-316-60290-7
- Preceded by: Four Blind Mice
- Followed by: London Bridges

The Big Bad Wolf is the ninth novel in the Alex Cross series written by James Patterson and was published in November 2003. USA Today named it the seventh best-selling novel in 2004.

== Series overview ==
Alex Cross is a trained forensic psychiatrist and former Washington D.C. homicide detective. He is an African-American based out of the Southeast quadrant of D.C. The Big Bad Wolf is the first novel in the series to feature him in his new role as an FBI agent.

Cross is portrayed as a lonely individual, though empathic and a model father. Though well-educated and well-paid, he chooses to reside in the poor Southeast quadrant. He is very involved in the community, most notably volunteering at St. Anthony's Parish in his neighborhood.

== Plot ==
Cross is in the middle of his training at the FBI when he is assigned to work on a kidnapping case. A federal judge's wife has been kidnapped, and Cross discovers that her kidnapping fits the pattern of other recent kidnappings.

A Russian mobster known as "the Wolf" has been kidnapping people and selling them into sexual slavery. In addition to the judge's wife, his subordinates also kidnap a housewife, and several male college students for clients.

Though Cross is able to identify the Wolf as a key player in the human trafficking ring, his true identity and whereabouts remain a mystery. The only method of contacting him is through a high-tech, secure website, and any person the FBI manages to take into custody ends up dead at the hands of a mole.

Eventually, with the assistance of the New York City Police Department, Central Intelligence Agency, Secret Service, and the Russian government, the FBI is able to arrest a man by the name of Andrei Prokopev. Though the FBI believes him to be the Wolf, it is revealed at the very end of the novel that the Wolf is, in fact, still at large.

== Sequel ==
A sequel, London Bridges has been made featuring the Wolf and Cross face off again, but the Wolf asks for Geoffrey Shafer's assistance in defeating Cross. Shafer was one of Alex's oldest foes, who in fact, ruined his life.
