= London Bridges =

2004 novel by James Patterson

- First edition
- Author: James Patterson
- Language: English
- Series: Alex Cross
- Genre: Crime, mystery, thriller
- Publisher: Little, Brown
- Publication place: United States
- Media type: Print (hardback & paperback) and audiobook
- Preceded by: Big Bad Wolf
- Followed by: Mary, Mary

London Bridges is the tenth novel by James Patterson featuring the former Washington, D.C. homicide detective and forensic psychiatrist and current FBI agent Alex Cross. It was published in 2004.

== Plot summary ==
A terrorist by the alias of "The Wolf" engages Alex Cross' old enemy, Col. Geoffrey Shafer, aka The Weasel, to assist him in a grand plan of worldwide terrorist attacks designed to get humanity's attention. After a town in the Southwestern United States is blown up, the FBI's Alex Cross is assigned to the case despite being on vacation to visit his son Alex Jr. in Seattle and his girlfriend Jamilla Hughes in San Francisco. Alex is at a crossroads in his family and personal life.

What follows next is a long cat and mouse chase in which politics, communication, and ego take center-stage. The Wolf is ruthless enough to draw in even the most unwilling into his plans and never fails to make a point. His opponents are locked in deep wrangling and indecision. It is up to Alex Cross to make the connections and chase The Wolf and The Weasel across America and Europe at the risk of his life.
