= Alex Cross, Run =

Novel by James Patterson

- First edition
- Author: James Patterson
- Original title: Run Alex Cross
- Language: English
- Series: Alex Cross series
- Genre: Crime, mystery, thriller
- Publisher: Little, Brown
- Publication date: February 18, 2013
- Publication place: United States
- Media type: Hardcover
- Pages: 407
- ISBN: 978-0-316-09751-2
- Preceded by: Merry Christmas, Alex Cross
- Followed by: Cross My Heart

Alex Cross, Run is the 20th novel in the Alex Cross series written by American author James Patterson. The novel focuses on the protagonist, detective Alex Cross, who must solve three cases at once with the whole city in a frenzy.

== Plot ==
Metropolitan Police Department officer Alex Cross, John Sampson, and others, invade plastic surgeon Elijah Creem's penthouse where he is illegally giving drugs and having sex (while making pornographic videos) with teenage girls. He is arrested, his wife divorces and leaves him. Alex is later called on to a case in which a girl, Elizabeth Reilly, is found dead. After examining her body, reports confirm she gave birth, but the baby is nowhere to be found. Soon after, he is called on to a case featuring a boy shot, stabbed, and found in the Potomac river. Alex is then called onto a third case featuring another dead girl. Alex must struggle with three cases all at once.

Meanwhile, Ron Guidice, whose fiancé was killed by an officer from MPD, blames Alex for the murder and posts negative comments about Alex at his website, "TheRealDeal". Alex visits the pregnant girl's grandparents. The missing baby, a girl, has been found and given to them. They received numerous letters from when Elizabeth was out of her hometown and went to Washington. In one letter, it is mentioned that Elizabeth fell in love with a man named Russell, but when checking the databases, they find no such man. Instead, they find an older case where another pregnant girl was killed, the child missing.

At home, Alex faces problems when his soon-to-be adopted "daughter" Ava comes home late, possibly on drugs. Ron Guidice overhears, having earlier installed spy equipment in the Cross family house so he can follow their conversations.

It is eventually revealed that Elijah kills the girls and Joshua Bergman, Creem's oldest friend, who is homosexual, kills boys. More bodies show up, and Alex is at one of the murder scenes when Guidice shows up and asks Alex if he is on drugs. Angered, Alex and Guidice fight, and Guidice injects something into Alex. Alex breaks Guidices's nose. Cross collapses and is taken to the hospital. After getting out of the hospital, his gun and badge are taken away and he is forced to do desk work. Guidice's posts on his website and the fact that Alex collapsed due to drugs finally led to Ava being taken away from the Cross family by foster care.

Guidice is revealed to have a daughter named Emma Lee who is watched by his mother living at home. One day Ron comes home with a baby girl, claiming that "some slut" he hooked up with long ago gave birth and left the child in his car. In truth, he killed the Reilly grandparents and took the child.

Meanwhile, Creem robs his own house and kills the neighbors next door to scare off his ex-wife. Alex is eventually restored back to duty, but some investigative work while in "no contact" mode convinces him that Creem is a suspect. Creem is arrested, but released due to circumstantial evidence. Creem decides to flaunt his freedom and invites his mistress to his house while Alex is on surveillance outside of Creem's house. Creem asks Bergman for a favor, but Bergman asks for a kiss in return, to which Creem finally gives in. The next day the mistress is found dead in her apartment, killed by Bergman. Creem's not at his house, so Alex goes to find Bergman, who kills himself when Alex comes near him. Alex finds out that Creem killed all the women as a surrogate for his ex-wife and daughters. He tracks Creem to his ex-wife's house in Rhode Island and stops him from killing her and the daughters. Creem jumps out of the third-story window, surviving the fall but breaking his spine.

Alex is then told that Ava has been missing for many days from the foster home. He takes a leave from work to try to find her. Sampson sneaks into Guidice's condo to find anything to get revenge on Guidice for telling all of Washington that Alex gave drugs to Ava, but finds nothing. After asking a neighbor, Sampson discovers Guidice has a mother and daughter. Sampson later discovers that Ava is dead, having been burned in a flop house. At the foster home, Alex asks if anyone knows where Ava has been. Her roommate shows him a picture of "Ava's boyfriend" Russell, the name of Elizabeth's, the first pregnant girl, boyfriend. Examining the picture, Alex recognizes Guidice and rushes home to tell Sampson and Bree. Going to his safe, Cross gets his gun, intending to kill Guidice for what he has done. Outside at his car, Alex is attacked by Guidice. In the ensuing gunfight, Guidice is killed by Bree. Blood tests confirm that Guidice's baby daughter is Elizabeth's child and Emma Lee is the missing child from the older case. Both children were fathered by Guidice.

Alex considers whether or not he and Bree will have children, inspired by Bree holding Guidice's biological second daughter. The novel ends with Alex asking his therapist Adele Finaly if he will ever outgrow or solve his problem in life, that he is a cop which endangers his, his friends', and his family's lives. She asks Cross what he thinks he should do. "Keep showing up here until I'm so sick of hearing myself talk that I finally make a change." Adele says that eventually he may solve that problem.

== Marketing ==
The first 10 pages can be read at the official James Patterson website. Before the book's release, in February, the first 21 chapters were offered to be read at the website as well.

== Reception ==
The book received mainly favorable reviews. It debuted at the number-one spot of The New York Times Bestseller List, and held its spot for four weeks.
