= Double Cross (novel) =

2007 novel by James Patterson

- Author: James Patterson
- Language: English
- Series: Alex Cross
- Genre: Crime, mystery, thriller
- Publisher: Little, Brown
- Publication date: November 13, 2007
- Publication place: United States
- Media type: Print (hardcover)
- Pages: 400 pp (first edition, hardback)
- ISBN: 0-316-01505-9 (first edition, hardback)
- OCLC: 128237623
- Dewey Decimal: 813/.54 22
- LC Class: PS3566.A822 D68 2007
- Preceded by: Cross
- Followed by: Cross Country

Double Cross is the 13th novel in James Patterson's Alex Cross series featuring Detective Alex Cross. It was released on November 13, 2007.

On December 2, 2007, Double Cross became number 1 on the New York Times bestseller list.

== Plot ==
Four years prior to the beginning of the story, Kyle Craig is sent to prison for his crimes in Roses Are Red and Violets Are Blue and swears revenge upon Detective Alex Cross, who was responsible for his capture.

In the present day, Alex is on a date with police officer Brianna 'Bree' Stone, when they are interrupted by the news of crime-writer author Tess Olsen's death. Upon arriving in Washington, D.C., Alex decides to help, even though he is no longer a detective. The investigators find a Hallmark greeting card and a tape featuring the killer throwing Olsen from a balcony in her apartment. In the video, the killer turns toward the camera and says "In your honor." Alex, Bree, and John Sampson, Alex's best friend and co-worker, discover that the footage of the murder was used twice. Later, the murderer goes to a play and kills Matthew Jay Walker, an actor, and posts videos of his murders on the internet. Alex realizes that the murderer wants an audience, and therefore is nicknamed "DCAK" (an abbreviation of "DC Audience Killer"). At his psychology practice, Alex talks to Sandy Quinlan, a sex-crazed woman and meets another patient, Anthony Demao. Anthony is a war-veteran who killed his partner, Matthew, after Matthew had ordered him to due to his terminal health.

As the murders get more serious, Alex decides to once again work with the DC Metropolitan Police Department while continuing his work as a psychologist. It becomes apparent that the DCAK role-plays as a different alter-ego during each murder. The killer sets up multiple websites featuring footage, pictures, and messages from him and his victims. In a federal prison in Colorado, Kyle Craig receives a visit from his lawyer, Mason Wainwright. Wainwright puts on a human-like mask of Kyle's face and gives one with his face to Kyle, allowing Kyle to escape and Mason to stay in his place. Wainwright dies shortly afterward. Alex learns of Craig's escape and goes to Florence where he reviews footage of Olsen interviewing Kyle for her latest book. Back in D.C., FBI agent, Brian 'Kitz' Kitzmiller is assigned to help Sampson, Bree, and Alex. A DCAK copycat, wearing a Richard Nixon mask, kidnaps a teen couple. The copycat killer kills the boy, while the girl is run over. Meanwhile, Kyle visits his mother, who he blames for letting his father beat Kyle as a child. Kyle steals money from his mother, then shoots and kills her.

In Iowa, Kyle murders a woman after pretending to wish to sleep with her. Alex goes to his office where he witnesses Sandy giving Anthony a hand job. Alex demands to speak with Sandy while Anthony waits outside, but Anthony leaves. Later that day, the Sandy and Anthony meet at a coffee shop, where they make-out as Sandy shouts to the onlookers in the restaurant that Anthony is her brother. Anthony reveals to Sandy that he has received a message from Kyle announcing that he wishes to see DCAK, implying to the audience that they are the DCAK. Alex, Sampson, and Bree go to a press conference in Baltimore, where Alex finds a message from DCAK stating that Alex is missing the "show". Alex learns the attempts to track the woman who had delivered the message, but she escapes in her car. Alex then heads to Washington where a pregnant woman has been found murdered at the National Air and Space Museum. Upon returning home, Alex learns from his kids, Alex 'Ali' Jr. and Jannie, and his grandmother, Nana, that his oldest son, Damon, has run away. Sampson finds Damon playing basketball. Alex scolds Damon, who is frustrated that Alex missed a meeting to allow Damon to attend a prep school, Cushing Academy, in Ashburnham Massachusetts. Alex apologizes to Damon and takes him home. Trying to find peace for a moment, Alex and Bree go to a hotel and make love.

Eventually, Alex receives a message from DCAK, who announces he has caught the copycat. DCAK throws the copycat's body from a helicopter onto a nearby roof. Alex and Bree use a ladder to get to the roof where they find Kitz's dead body. Back on the street, Bree is asked for an interview from a "reporter", Neil Stephens, who punches Bree and flees. Alex later suspects that Tyler Bell, the brother of a murderer, Michael Bell, that Alex had killed is DCAK. Kyle Craig kills a maid in his hotel in Paris before heading to Washington. Kyle arrives in Washington and murders Judge Nina Wolff, who had sentenced him to prison. At Alex's practice, Sandy tells Alex that she will be leaving for Michigan and gives Alex a kiss. While tracking down Bell's former house, a cabin in the woods, Alex and Bree learn that Bell had purchased milk days before he was last seen, causing Alex to get suspicious. Alex then discovers DCAK has kidnapped Sampson. When he returns to Washington, Alex finds a phone attached to his car. He is given directions from the phone to DCAK's hideout.

After arriving at the destination, Alex and Bree are tied to chairs. DCAK reveals himself to be the man Alex knew as Anthony in addition to Neil Stephens, the reporter. The mysterious woman from Baltimore is revealed to be his sister, who had been posing as Sandy. After angering DCAK, who reveals he had killed Bell, Bree manages to escape her bounds and shoot and kill Sandy. DCAK escapes with Alex in pursuit, leading to a chase through a Mexican-food restaurant. Alex catches and stabs DCAK, who survives. However, Kyle Craig appears, revealing he and DCAK are mutual fans. Alex is nearly killed by Kyle before Bree arrives and shoots and apparently kills him. Craig, who is not dead, attempts to shoot Bree but purposefully misses. He is able to flee. At the hospital, Alex realizes DCAK and his sister are really Aaron and Sarah Dennison. Aaron curses at Alex, vowing revenge, which Alex dismisses. The book ends with Alex taking Damon to Massachusetts to go to Cushing Academy, when Alex receives a message stating there has been a murder in Georgetown, setting up the events for Cross Country.

== Release details ==
- 2007, USA, Little Brown ISBN 0-316-01505-9, 13 November 2007, hardback
