= Kiss the Girls (novel) =

Novel by James Patterson

- First edition
- Author: James Patterson
- Language: English
- Series: Alex Cross
- Release number: 2
- Genre: Crime, mystery, thriller
- Publisher: Little, Brown and Company
- Publication date: January 11, 1995
- Publication place: United States
- Media type: Print (hardback & paperback)
- Pages: 464 pp
- ISBN: 0-316-69370-7
- OCLC: 30109286
- Dewey Decimal: 813/.54 20
- LC Class: PS3566.A822 K57 1995
- Preceded by: Along Came a Spider
- Followed by: Jack & Jill

Kiss the Girls is a psychological thriller novel by American writer James Patterson, the second to star his recurring main character Alex Cross, a Black American psychologist and policeman. It was first published in 1995 and was adapted into a film of the same name in 1997.

== Plot ==
As a teenage boy in 1975 Boca Raton, Florida, a future serial killer calling himself Casanova kills his first four victims. Elsewhere in 1981 Chapel Hill, North Carolina, another killer calling himself The Gentleman Caller kills a young couple on a lake.

Years later, Casanova leaves a young woman to die in the woods. Around the same time, Police Detective Alex Cross returns to his Washington, D.C. home to find several relatives waiting for him and is informed that his niece, Naomi "Scootchie" Cross, currently a student at Duke University in Durham, North Carolina, is missing. He travels to North Carolina with his partner Sampson. They meet Durham detectives Nick Ruskin and Davey Sikes, who tell them that the FBI and DEA are involved and that eight to ten women are missing, all from different states; all have received notes from someone calling himself Casanova. Around the same time, Casanova abducts another woman, Dr. Kate McTiernan, and makes her part of his harem of young, attractive, and exceptional women.

In Los Angeles, reporter Beth Lieberman is working on a serial killer story about The Gentleman Caller, who has just raped and murdered a 14-year-old girl. He threatens "bonus kills" if his letters are not published in her newspaper. FBI agent Kyle Craig meets Lieberman in L.A.

Casanova plans to kill Kate McTiernan because she has broken his rules, but she fights him and manages to escape, running into a forest and jumping off a cliff into a river. Meanwhile, Cross discovers that one of The Gentleman Caller's notes published in the Los Angeles Times mentions Naomi. After contacting Lieberman and her editor-in-chief, he learns that Casanova and The Gentleman Caller are communicating as East Coast and West Coast serial killers. McTiernan, recovering at a hospital, is visited by Cross. He learns she was drugged with Marinol, which leads them to believe that Casanova is a doctor or a pharmacist. Agent Craig informs them that Lieberman was murdered by The Gentleman Caller. Her files contained hints to a possible suspect, Dr. William Rudolph from Los Angeles. Cross and McTiernan travel there with Craig, and McTiernan rules Rudolph out as Casanova, meaning he must be The Gentleman Caller. A manhunt for the killer begins, but he escapes several times and vanishes. A search of his apartment uncovers a picture of him with one Dr. Wick Sachs; notes on the back identify Sachs as Casanova.

Cross and Sampson discuss a theory that the girls are being held in an underground house, built in an area that was part of the Underground Railroad. Sachs is a professor at Duke and known as the campus skeleton, as well as a suspect when two students were murdered in the early 1980s. Later Ruskin and Sikes ask Cross for help in catching Casanova, whom they believe to be Sachs.

Rudolph reminisces how he met Casanova, who had known Rudolph had killed the young couple. They shared their experiences and formed a bond. When they reunite, they decide to work together to eliminate Cross. They attack McTiernan after she returns to her home, leaving her seriously wounded. Cross notices the attack is different from the first one and suspects both men worked together. The next day, Dr. Sachs is brought in for questioning. Cross attacks him physically, noticing that Sachs is not very strong, and Cross is sure that he is not Casanova. However, the FBI arrests Sachs nonetheless after finding evidence pointing to him. Sampson and Cross head to the forest again, taking a hand-written map given to them by an Underground Railroad historian. In a previously unsearched area, they find the underground house with the captive women. However, the two killers have been watching and assault them, seriously injuring Sampson. Cross shoots at them, hitting one in the shoulder. The two leave, stealing a truck. Cross pursues them and eventually forces them to separate. In the following gunfight, he kills Rudolph. The surviving women, including Naomi, are reunited with their loved ones.

Cross looks for clues and deduces Casanova's true identity. Cross keeps the information from Agent Craig and decides to conduct his own stakeout. He follows Detective Sikes, positive that he is Casanova, looking for a new woman to kidnap. Cross snoops outside a house that Sikes has entered. Sikes sees him, and they fight. The woman turns out to be Sikes' mistress, an affair the FBI knew about.

Later, while McTiernan and Cross are on a vacation, Cross goes jogging and finds a dead FBI agent. He runs back to the house where Casanova, who is revealed to be Sikes' partner, Ruskin, hits him with a stun gun. With Cross incapacitated, Casanova heads for Kate, but she fights him and defeats him. As he aims his gun at her, Cross recovers in time to shoot and kill him. Cross and McTiernan later go their separate ways even though they have become close friends. Once back in Washington, Cross and Sampson receive a new case.

== Characters ==
- Dr. Alex Cross: An African-American forensic psychologist as well as a detective, described as good-looking and well-built. He is often referred to as "Doctor Detective". Despite being very dedicated to his job, he manages to be a devoted father to his two children. He is the uncle of Naomi Cross, one of the Casanova's victims, which is the reason why he travels south to help in the investigation.
- Dr. Kate McTiernan: A young physician who is captured by Casanova as part of his "harem", but manages to escape from his underground hiding place thanks to her martial-arts skills. After recovering physically, she joins Cross on the hunt for her abductor, and starts to develop a close relationship with him.
- Casanova: A serial killer from North Carolina who "collects" beautiful, exceptional, young women whom he holds in an underground "harem", raping and eventually murdering them. He bonded with The Gentleman Caller years ago and they murdered women together for some time.
- The Gentleman Caller: The other serial killer in the story, a much more brutal and direct murderer who likes to cut off bodyparts and keep them as trophies. He murdered a young couple on a lake in the early 80s, and was soon discovered by Casanova, with whom he formed a unique bond.

== Film adaptation ==
The novel was adapted into a 1997 film directed by Gary Fleder and stars Morgan Freeman as Alex Cross, Cary Elwes as Nick Ruskin, and Ashley Judd as Kate McTiernan. A number of subplots and characters from the book were removed in the screenplay, most notably the character of Beth Lieberman and the publishing of notes in the Los Angeles Times, as well as Cross suspecting and tailing Sikes.

== Popular culture ==
Brendan Dassey, nephew of Steven Avery and on trial for the murder of Teresa Halbach, said in his trial that, although he could not remember the author's name, he had made up part of his confession based on reading Kiss the Girls.
