= Four Blind Mice =

Book by James Patterson

- Author: James Patterson
- Language: English
- Series: Alex Cross
- Genre: Crime, mystery, thriller
- Publisher: Little, Brown and Company
- Publication date: November 18, 2002 (1st ed. hardcover)
- Publication place: United States
- Pages: 400
- ISBN: 978-0-316-69300-4
- Preceded by: Violets Are Blue
- Followed by: The Big Bad Wolf

Four Blind Mice is the eighth novel featuring the Washington, D.C. homicide detective and forensic psychologist Alex Cross, written by James Patterson.

== Plot ==
The novel features Washington D.C. Metro Police homicide detectives Alex Cross and John Sampson as protagonists. While investigating the wrongful conviction and execution of US Army Sergeant Ellis Cooper, their investigation uncovers a series of Army personnel wrongfully convicted and executed for murdering countless civilians. In each instance, the murderer's modus operandi involved painting the corpse.

In the course of the investigation, Cross and Sampson discover that three Army Rangers had committed similar crimes during the Vietnam War. The three Rangers, nicknamed the "Three Blind Mice" (Thomas Starkey, Brownley Harris, and Warren Griffin), had performed a series of unauthorized killings of unarmed villagers and subsequently painted the bodies red, white, and blue. Cross and Sampson track down the killers, but all three are killed in the resulting gunfight.

Cross determines that the mastermind behind the murders is General Mark Hutchinson, Commandant of West Point. Hutchinson had been ordering The Three Blind Mice to frame Army personnel who had committed atrocities while serving in Vietnam. Another victim, Colonel Handler, had discovered the plot and was killed so as to not jeopardize Hutchinson's candidacy for the Joint Chiefs of Staff. Hutchinson captures Cross, but before he can murder him, Hutchinson is killed by members of a Vietnamese street gang in retaliation for his sanctioning of and involvement in Vietnam War atrocities.

== See also ==
- War crimes committed by the United States
