= Roses Are Red (novel) =

Novel by James Patterson

- First edition
- Author: James Patterson
- Language: English
- Series: Alex Cross
- Genre: Crime, mystery, thriller
- Publisher: Little, Brown and Company
- Publication date: 2000
- Publication place: United States
- Media type: Print (hardcover, paperback)
- Pages: 400 pp
- ISBN: 0-316-69325-1
- OCLC: 43641257
- Dewey Decimal: 813/.54 21
- LC Class: PS3566.A822 R67 2000
- Preceded by: Pop Goes the Weasel
- Followed by: Violets Are Blue

Roses Are Red is the sixth novel featuring the Washington, D.C. homicide detective and forensic psychiatrist Alex Cross written by James Patterson.

== Plot summary ==
Alex Cross returns for the sixth book in the series with a new killer on the loose. A series of meticulously planned bank robberies leave behind a wake of bodies. Alex Cross must not only battle against the sadistic criminal who calls himself The Mastermind, but also the risks that he may be putting his family in. Cross takes a plunge into a case where mind games lead to violence and the slightest mistake will be punished with death.

The events continue in Violets Are Blue.
