= Along Came a Spider (novel) =

Novel by James Patterson

- First edition
- Author: James Patterson
- Language: English
- Series: Alex Cross
- Release number: 2
- Genre: Crime, mystery, thriller
- Publisher: Little, Brown and Company
- Publication date: February 3, 1993
- Publication place: United States
- Media type: Print (hardback & paperback)
- Pages: 435 pp
- ISBN: 0-316-69364-2
- OCLC: 25995508
- Dewey Decimal: 813/.54 20
- LC Class: PS3566.A822 A79 1993
- Followed by: Kiss the Girls

Along Came a Spider is a crime thriller novel, and the first novel in James Patterson's series about forensic psychologist Alex Cross. First published in 1993, its success has led to twenty-six sequels as of 2021.

It was adapted into a film of the same name in 2001, starring Morgan Freeman as Cross.

== Plot ==
Alex Cross, a psychologist and police detective, is called to a crime scene where a mother and her two children were murdered. As Alex and his partner, John Sampson, explore the crime scene, Alex gets a call from his boss, Chief of Detectives Pittman, demanding that Alex and John join a new investigation into two kidnapped children. The children are Maggie-Rose Dunne and Michael Goldberg, both from wealthy and prominent families, who are under the protection of Secret Service agents. The kidnapper is Gary Soneji, a mastermind criminal, who has been posing as a teacher at the private school the kids attend.

Alex and John arrive at the children's school to discover fellow officers from the Washington, D.C. police department, the Secret Service, and FBI agents. Alex works with the hostage rescue team, which includes Secret Service supervisor Jezzie Flanagan. Within days, the body of Michael is found by a river in Maryland. Not long afterward, the hostage rescue team receives a ransom demand from the kidnapper. The team rushes to Florida to investigate the business where the demand originated from. While there, they receive another demand and decide to follow the instructions in the hopes of saving Maggie.

Alex is chosen by the kidnapper to deliver the ransom at Disney World. As he walks through the park, he is approached by a man he suspects is not the kidnapper. Still, the man knows about the ransom demand and convinces Alex to leave the park with him. Alex and the man board a private plane and end up at a private airport in South Carolina. As the man leaves the plane with the ransom, Alex frees himself from the armrest he is handcuffed to and chases the man, only to be hit on the head by an unseen person.

Alex and John return their attention to the Sanders family murders. Alex has also begun a relationship with Jezzie. Unable to let go of the kidnapping case, he investigates on his own. Eventually, a teacher from the childrens' school is found murdered in the same manner as the Sanders women, and Maggie's shoe is left at the crime scene. Alex and John find a witness who places a Delaware door-to-door salesman in the area.

The hostage rescue team swarms the home of Gary Murphy, a door-to-door salesman. However, he saw them coming and escapes. Several days later, he walks into a McDonald's in Pennsylvania, kills a man, and takes the other patrons hostage. Alex arrives with John and talks Gary out of the restaurant. Gary is arrested and taken to a Virginia prison where Alex visits him. The suspect claims to have a dissociative identity disorder, and Alex convinces those in charge to allow him to hypnotize Gary to determine if he is telling the truth. Under hypnosis, Gary appears to become his alter-ego, Gary Soneji, and lashes out at Alex.

Gary is put on trial for the kidnappings and the murder of Michael. The defense attorney calls Alex to the stand in the hopes of convincing the jury of Gary's split personality; Alex is allowed to hypnotize Gary in the courtroom. Gary appears to remember things Soneji did, including the idea that someone took Maggie from the farm where Soneji hid her. Shortly after, Gary is found guilty of kidnapping and murder. In prison, Gary seemingly becomes Soneji. Alex speaks with Soneji and learns details about the kidnapping, including his insistence that Maggie was taken without his knowledge. Soneji insists he was being watched before the kidnappings, including the night he murdered the Sanders family. He suggests these watchers were cops. Shortly after, Soneji escapes prison with the help of a prison guard.

Alex connects Soneji's story of being watched to the Secret Service agents assigned to Michael Goldberg and goes to the FBI with his theory. The FBI confirms Alex's suspicions and believes that Jezzie was involved due to her sexual relationship with one of the agents.

Cross takes Jezzie on a Caribbean getaway and confronts her about her actions. She explains that Devine and Chakely noticed Soneji driving by the Goldberg house and followed him. The ransom was her idea, and they removed Maggie-Rose after Michael died accidentally. Jezzie is arrested based on a recording Sampson made of the conversation, and Maggie-Rose is found with a native Bolivian family near the Andes Mountains, where she had been living for the past two years.

Alex returns home and is attacked by Soneji in the middle of the night. He fights Soneji off and chases him out of the house. In a matter of hours, the police corner Soneji near the White House. As Alex attempts to coax him out, John shoots Soneji, who is then returned to prison. Not long after, Alex attends Jezzie's execution by lethal injection. Soneji writes a last taunting letter to Cross and bribes a guard to leave it on Cross' windshield. Disturbed but unwilling to let Soneji disrupt his life any further, Cross returns home to spend time with his family.

== Characters ==
- Alex Cross: An African-American forensic psychologist as well as a detective, described as good-looking and well-built. He is often referred to as "Doctor Detective". Despite being very dedicated to his job, he manages to be a devoted father to his two children. His wife, Maria, was killed in a shooting before the novel begins and he is romantically involved with Jezzie Flanagan before he finds out her role in Maggie Rose's disappearance.
- Jezzie Flanagan: Before the kidnapping of Maggie Rose and Michael Goldberg, she held an esteemed position in the Secret Service—the first woman ever to hold the position. She is described as very beautiful, though she confides in Alex that she wishes she'd been born plain so she wouldn't have to face as much sexism in her workplace. As a white woman romantically involved with Alex (an African-American man), she faces racism, though she handles it better than Alex does. Both her parents were alcoholics, and her father committed suicide. She names them as "smart failures", or brilliant people who never made anything of their lives. When Alex confronts her about her betrayal, she admits that she approached him at first strictly to get information on what the cops knew, but that she later fell in love with him and his children.
- Gary Murphy / Soneji: As a boy, he was physically and sexually abused by his father and stepmother, which caused him to develop a split personality. Gary Murphy is a normal, all-American father and husband, while Gary Soneji is a cold-blooded predator who fantasizes about kidnapping and burying a baby alive at twelve and orchestrates the kidnapping of Maggie Rose and Michael Goldberg. He has an obsession with being famous, and wants to be the most feared criminal in America.

== In other media ==
=== Film ===
A film adaptation of the same name was released on April 6, 2001, starring Morgan Freeman as Alex Cross, Monica Potter as Jezzie Flanagan, and Michael Wincott as Gary Soneji. The adaptation makes substantial changes to the plot, omitting much of Soneji's background and his split personality, as well as changing the identity of the kidnapped children's parents and many characters' eventual fate.

== See also ==
- Little Miss Muffet
