= Violets Are Blue (novel) =

2001 novel by James Patterson

- First edition
- Author: James Patterson
- Language: English
- Series: Alex Cross
- Genre: Crime, mystery, thriller
- Publisher: Little, Brown
- Publication date: 2001
- Publication place: United States
- Preceded by: Roses Are Red
- Followed by: Four Blind Mice

Violets Are Blue is the seventh novel by James Patterson to feature the Washington, D.C. homicide detective and forensic psychiatrist Alex Cross.

== Plot summary ==
Alex receives a call from the Mastermind, who tells Alex that he killed Cavalierre.

Kyle Craig calls Alex about a similarity between two murders in San Francisco and a murder in Washington DC that they'd worked on a few months before. The case involved a runaway girl that was found hanged from a light fixture in a hotel room.

The FBI requests that he go to San Francisco to meet Inspector Jamilla Hughes. First, Alex takes Jannie and Ali to school but tells them he'll be back for Damon's choir concert.

Jamilla picks Cross up at the airport. She takes him to the morgue to see the bodies. A friend of hers, Dr. Allan Pang (a dental expert)is examining the bites on the victims. After reviewing the bites, he deduces that the man was bitten and mauled by a tiger and the girl was bitten by humans.

William and Michael watch the story unfold on TV. They were on a mission and the publicity was part of the plan. William tells Michael that he has a plan for that night. The two brothers break into a funeral home and feast on a dead woman who had not yet been embalmed. Cross is still impressed by Jamilla's work ethic. Alex is working on trying to find a lead on the tiger. He's checking with zoos, veterinarians, and animal trainers. Jamilla calls Alex early the next morning regarding a lead from a reporter friend. They drive to Los Angeles to meet with a woman who had gotten away after an attack by two men, but she had been bitten several times. The attacks had happened over a year ago. Jamilla returns to San Francisco, but leaves her notes with Alex and Kyle. She believes that although the murders are similar, the patterns are different, and may have been committed by different people. Alex concurs. Jamilla tells Alex about the break-in at the funeral home.

Alex and Jamilla follow up on a boy who killed his parents in vampiric sacrifices. The kid is caught but manages to bite Alex causing an infection. The boy claims he follows the leader of the vampires who they call the sire. While Alex is sick the mastermind breaks into Alex’s home but decides not to kill him. Jamilla realizes the sire is a magician who had visited several of the cities murders took place at. Alex and Jamilla visit one of his parties for vampires however William and Michael kill him revealing they committed the recent murders as a part of a coup for their sire.

Then, he thinks about Kyle's next victim, and he decides it could be his old friend, Kate McTiernan from Kiss The Girls. After calling Kate and warning her to get out of town for her own safety, Alex rushes to her home. Kyle is sent to prison, Alex officially starts dating Jamilla Hughes, and things start to calm down for the first time in years for the Cross family.

== Development ==
=== Publication history ===
Violets are Blue was published by Little, Brown and Company on November 19, 2001.

== Reception ==
Kirkus Reviews published a negative review, describing Patterson as having "hoodwinked his publisher" and criticizing the plot and characters. Publishers Weekly was similarly negative, criticizing the quality of the two cases in the book.
