= James Patterson bibliography =

James Patterson has written or co-written many novels and "Bookshots" or novellas, and has co-written books with many authors. The list below separates the works into four main categories: fiction written for adults, for young adults and for children, and non-fiction.

== Fiction written for adults ==
=== Novels ===
==== Cross series ====
===== Alex Cross series =====
1. Along Came a Spider (1993), Boston: Little, Brown and Company ISBN 978-0-316-69364-6
2. Kiss the Girls (1995), Boston: Little, Brown and Company ISBN 978-0-316-69370-7
3. Jack and Jill (1996), Boston: Little, Brown and Company ISBN 978-0-316-69371-4
4. Cat and Mouse (1997), Boston: Little, Brown and Company ISBN 978-0-316-69329-5
5. Pop Goes the Weasel (1999), Boston: Little, Brown and Company ISBN 978-0-316-69328-8
6. Roses Are Red (2000), Boston: Little, Brown and Company ISBN 978-0-316-69325-7
7. Violets Are Blue (2001), Boston: Little, Brown and Company ISBN 978-0-316-69323-3
8. Four Blind Mice (2002), Boston: Little, Brown and Company ISBN 978-0-316-69300-4
9. The Big Bad Wolf (2003), Boston: Little, Brown and Company ISBN 978-0-316-60290-7
10. London Bridges (2004), New York: Little, Brown and Company ISBN 978-0-316-71059-6
11. Mary, Mary (2005), New York: Little, Brown and Company ISBN 978-0-316-15976-0
12. Cross, or Alex Cross (2006), New York: Little, Brown and Company ISBN 978-0-316-15979-1
13. Double Cross (2007), New York: Little, Brown and Company ISBN 978-0-316-01505-9
14. Cross Country (2008), New York: Little, Brown and Company ISBN 978-0-316-01872-2
15. Alex Cross's Trial (2009), with Richard DiLallo, New York: Little, Brown and Company ISBN 978-0-316-07062-1
16. I, Alex Cross (2009), New York: Little, Brown and Company ISBN 978-0-316-01878-4
17. Cross Fire (2010), New York: Little, Brown and Company ISBN 978-0-316-03617-7
18. Kill Alex Cross (2011), New York: Little, Brown and Company ISBN 978-0-316-19873-8
19. Merry Christmas, Alex Cross (2012), New York: Little, Brown and Company ISBN 978-0-316-21068-3
20. Alex Cross, Run (2013), New York: Little, Brown and Company ISBN 978-0-316-22423-9
21. Cross My Heart (2013), New York: Little, Brown and Company ISBN 978-0-316-21090-4
22. Hope to Die (2014), New York: Little, Brown and Company ISBN 978-0-316-21096-6
23. Cross Justice (2015), New York: Little, Brown and Company ISBN 978-0-316-40704-5
24. Cross the Line (2016), New York: Little, Brown and Company ISBN 978-0-316-40709-0
25. The People vs. Alex Cross (2017), New York: Little, Brown and Company ISBN 978-1-780-89515-4
26. Target: Alex Cross (2018), New York: Little, Brown and Company ISBN 978-0-316-27394-7
27. Criss Cross (2019), New York: Little, Brown and Company ISBN 978-0-316-52688-3
28. Deadly Cross (2020), New York: Little, Brown and Company ISBN 978-0-316-42025-9
29. Fear No Evil (2021), New York: Little, Brown and Company ISBN 978-0-316-49914-9
30. Triple Cross (2022), New York: Little, Brown and Company ISBN 978-0316-49918-7
31. Cross Down (2023), New York: Little, Brown and Company ISBN 978-0316404594
32. Alex Cross Must Die (2024), New York: Little, Brown and Company ISBN 978-0316567114
33. The House of Cross (2024), New York: Little, Brown and Company ISBN 978-0-316-40268-2
34. Return of the Spider (2025), New York: Little, Brown and Company ISBN 978-0-316-56956-9
35. The Family Cross (2026), New York: Little, Brown and Company ISBN 978-0-316-56974-3

===== Others =====
- "Action" (2014), with Brent Gargan, short story
- "Cross Kill" (2016), novella, New York: BookShots ISBN 978-0-316-31714-6
- "Detective Cross" (2017), novella, New York: BookShots

===== Ali Cross series =====
1. Ali Cross (2019)
2. Ali Cross: Like Father Like Son (2021)
3. Ali Cross: The Secret Detective (2022)

==== Travis McKinley series ====
1. Miracle on the 17th Green (1996), with Peter de Jonge, Boston: Little, Brown and Company ISBN 0-316-69331-6
2. Miracle at Augusta (2015), with Peter de Jonge, New York: Little, Brown and Company ISBN 0-316-41097-7
3. Miracle at St. Andrews (2019), with Peter de Jonge, New York: Little, Brown and Company

==== When the Wind Blows series ====
1. When the Wind Blows (1998), New York: Little, Brown and Company ISBN 0-316-69332-4
2. The Lake House (2003), New York: Little, Brown and Company ISBN 0-316-60328-7

==== Women's Murder Club series ====
1. 1st to Die (2001), Boston: Little, Brown and Company ISBN 978-0-316-66600-8
2. 2nd Chance (2002), with Andrew Gross, Boston: Little, Brown and Company ISBN 978-0-316-69320-2
3. 3rd Degree (2004), with Andrew Gross, New York: Little, Brown and Company ISBN 978-0-316-60357-7
4. 4th of July (2005), with Maxine Paetro, New York: Little, Brown and Company ISBN 978-0-316-71060-2
5. The 5th Horseman (2006), with Maxine Paetro, New York: Little, Brown and Company ISBN 978-0-316-15977-7
6. The 6th Target (2007), with Maxine Paetro, New York: Little, Brown and Company ISBN 978-0-316-01479-3
7. 7th Heaven (2008), with Maxine Paetro, New York: Little, Brown and Company ISBN 978-0-316-01770-1
8. The 8th Confession (2009), with Maxine Paetro, New York: Little, Brown and Company ISBN 978-0-316-01876-0
9. The 9th Judgment (2010), with Maxine Paetro, New York: Little, Brown and Company ISBN 978-0-316-03627-6
10. 10th Anniversary (2011), with Maxine Paetro, New York: Little, Brown and Company ISBN 978-0-316-03626-9
11. 11th Hour (2012), with Maxine Paetro, New York: Little, Brown and Company ISBN 978-0-316-09749-9
12. 12th of Never (2013), with Maxine Paetro, New York: Little, Brown and Company ISBN 978-0-316-21082-9
13. Unlucky 13 (2014), with Maxine Paetro, New York: Little, Brown and Company ISBN 978-0-316-21129-1
14. 14th Deadly Sin (2015), with Maxine Paetro, New York: Little, Brown and Company ISBN 978-0-316-40702-1
15. 15th Affair (2016), with Maxine Paetro, New York: Little, Brown and Company ISBN 978-0-316-40707-6
  15.5. "The Trial" (2016), with Maxine Paetro, novella, New York: Little, Brown and Company ISBN 978-0-316-31715-3
16. 16th Seduction (2017), with Maxine Paetro, New York: Little, Brown and Company ISBN 978-0-316-27403-6
  16.5. "The Medical Examiner" (2017), with Maxine Paetro, novella
17. 17th Suspect (2018), with Maxine Paetro, New York: Little, Brown and Company ISBN 978-0-316-27404-3
18. 18th Abduction (2019), with Maxine Paetro, New York: Little, Brown and Company ISBN 978-0-316-42026-6
19. 19th Christmas (2019), with Maxine Paetro, New York: Little, Brown and Company ISBN 978-0-316-42027-3
20. 20th Victim (2020), with Maxine Paetro, New York: Little, Brown and Company ISBN 978-0-316-42028-0
21. 21st Birthday (2021), with Maxine Paetro, New York: Little, Brown and Company ISBN 978-0-316-49934-7
22. 22 Seconds (2022), with Maxine Paetro, New York: Little, Brown and Company ISBN 978-0-316-49937-8
23. The 23rd Midnight (2023), with Maxine Paetro, New York: Little, Brown and Company ISBN 978-0316402781
24. 23 1/2 Lies (2023), with Maxine Paetro, Andrew Bourelle, and Loren D. Estleman, New York: Little, Brown and Company ISBN 978-1538752722
25. The 24th Hour (2024), with Maxine Paetro, New York: Little, Brown and Company ISBN 978-0-316-40308-5
26. 25 Alive (2025), with Maxine Paetro, New York: Little, Brown and Company ISBN 978-0-316-56977-4

==== Honeymoon series ====
1. Honeymoon (2005), with Howard Roughan, New York: Little, Brown and Company ISBN 0-316-71062-8
2. Second Honeymoon (2013), with Howard Roughan, New York: Little, Brown and Company ISBN 978-0-316-21122-2

==== Michael Bennett series ====
1. Step on a Crack (2007), with Michael Ledwidge, New York: Little, Brown and Company ISBN 978-0-316-01394-9
2. Run for Your Life (2009), with Michael Ledwidge, New York: Little, Brown and Company ISBN 978-0-316-01874-6
3. Worst Case (2010), with Michael Ledwidge, New York: Little, Brown and Company ISBN 978-0-316-03622-1
4. Tick Tock (2011), with Michael Ledwidge, New York: Little, Brown and Company ISBN 978-0-316-03791-4
5. I, Michael Bennett (2012), with Michael Ledwidge, New York: Little, Brown and Company ISBN 978-0-316-09746-8
6. Gone (2013), with Michael Ledwidge, New York: Little, Brown and Company ISBN 978-0-316-21098-0
7. Burn (2014), with Michael Ledwidge, New York: Little, Brown and Company ISBN 978-0-316-21104-8
8. Alert (2015), with Michael Ledwidge, New York: Little, Brown and Company ISBN 978-0-316-40703-8
9. Bullseye (2016), with Michael Ledwidge, New York: Little, Brown and Company ISBN 978-0-316-40708-3
  9.5. "Chase" (2016), with Michael Ledwidge, novella
10. Haunted (2017), with James O. Born, New York: Little, Brown and Company ISBN 978-0-316-27397-8
  10.5. "Manhunt" (2017), with James O. Born, novella
11. Ambush (2018), with James O. Born, New York: Little, Brown and Company ISBN 978-0-316-27398-5
12. Blindside (2020), with James O. Born, New York: Little, Brown and Company ISBN 978-0-316-42033-4
13. The Russian (2021), with James O. Born, New York: Little, Brown and Company ISBN 978-0-316-42038-9
14. Shattered (2022), with James O. Born, New York: Little, Brown and Company ISBN 978-0-316-49948-4
15. Obsessed (2023), with James O. Born, New York: Little, Brown and Company ISBN 978-0-316-49957-6
16. Crosshairs (2024), with James O. Born, New York: Little, Brown and Company ISBN 978-0-316-40338-2
17. Paranoia (2025), with James O. Born, New York: Little, Brown and Company ISBN 978-0-316-40368-9

==== Private series ====
1. Private (2010), with Maxine Paetro, New York: Little, Brown and Company ISBN 978-0-316-09615-7
2. Private #1 Suspect (2012), with Maxine Paetro, New York: Little, Brown and Company ISBN 978-0-316-09740-6
3. Private Games (2012), with Mark T. Sullivan, New York: Little, Brown and Company ISBN 978-0-316-20682-2
4. Private London (2011), with Mark Pearson, New York: Grand Central Publishing ISBN 978-1-4555-2815-8
5. Private Berlin (2013), with Mark T. Sullivan, New York: Little, Brown and Company ISBN 978-0-316-21117-8
6. Private L.A. (2013), with Mark T. Sullivan, New York: Little, Brown and Company ISBN 978-0-316-21112-3
7. Private: Oz, or Private Down Under (2012), with Michael White, New York: Grand Central Publishing ISBN 978-1-4555-2976-6
8. Private India, or Private India: City on Fire (2014), with Ashwin Sanghi, New York: Grand Central Publishing ISBN 978-1-4555-6081-3
9. Private Vegas (2015), with Maxine Paetro, New York: Little, Brown and Company ISBN 978-0-316-21115-4
10. Private Paris (2016), with Mark T. Sullivan, New York: Little, Brown and Company ISBN 978-0-316-40705-2
11. The Games: A Private Novel, or Private Rio (2016), with Mark T. Sullivan, New York: Little, Brown and Company ISBN 978-0-316-29018-0
12. Private: Missing, or Private Sydney (2016), with Kathryn Fox, New York: Grand Central Publishing ISBN 978-1-4555-6814-7
  12.5. "Private Royals" (2016), with Rees Jones, novella, Bookshots ISBN 978-1786530172
13. Count to Ten: A Private Novel, or Private Delhi (2017), with Ashwin Sanghi
  13.5. "Private Gold" (2017), with Jassy Mackenzie, novella
14. Princess: A Private Novel, or Private Princess (2018), with Rees Jones, New York: Little, Brown and Company ISBN 978-1538714447
15. Private Moscow (2020), with Adam Hamdy, London: Century ISBN 978-1529124446
16. Missing Persons (2021), with Adam Hamdy, New York: Grand Central ISBN 978-1529124446

==== Zoo series ====
1. Zoo (2012), with Michael Ledwidge, New York: Little, Brown and Company ISBN 978-1-5387-5452-8
  1.5. "Zoo 2" (2016), with Max DiLallo, novella

==== NYPD Red series ====
1. NYPD Red (2012), with Marshall Karp, New York: Little, Brown and Company ISBN 978-0-316-19986-5
2. NYPD Red 2 (2014), with Marshall Karp, New York: Little, Brown and Company ISBN 978-0-316-21123-9
3. NYPD Red 3 (2015), with Marshall Karp, New York: Little, Brown and Company ISBN 978-0-316-40699-4
4. NYPD Red 4 (2016), with Marshall Karp, New York: Little, Brown and Company ISBN 978-0-316-40706-9
5. NYPD Red 5, or Red Alert (2018), with Marshall Karp, New York: Little, Brown and Company ISBN 978-178-089-527-7
6. NYPD Red 6 (2020), with Marshall Karp, ISBN 978-1-5387-0301-4

==== Invisible series ====
1. Invisible (2014), with David Ellis, New York: Little, Brown and Company ISBN 978-0-316-40534-8
2. Unsolved (2019), with David Ellis

==== Detective Harriet Blue series ====
0.5. "Black & Blue" (2016), with Candice Fox, novella

1. Never Never (2016), with Candice Fox, Boston: Little, Brown and Company ISBN 978-0-316-43317-4
2. Fifty Fifty (2017), with Candice Fox, Boston: Little, Brown and Company ISBN 978-0-316-51322-7
3. Liar Liar (2018), with Candice Fox, Boston: Little, Brown and Company ISBN 978-0-316-41824-9
4. Hush Hush (2019), with Candice Fox

==== David Shelley series ====
0.5. "Hunted" (2016), with Andrew Holmes, novella

1. Revenge (2018), with Andrew Holmes, New York: Knopf & Little, Brown and Company

==== Caleb Rooney series ====
0.5. "Killer Chef" (2016), with Jeffrey J. Keyes, novella

1. The Chef (2019), with Max DiLallo, New York: Little, Brown and Company ISBN 0316453307

==== Crazy House series ====
1. Crazy House (2017), with Gabrielle Charbonnet, Boston: Little, Brown and Company ISBN 978-0316431316
2. Fall of Crazy House (2018), with Gabrielle Charbonnet, Boston: Little, Brown and Company ISBN 978-0316433747

==== Instinct series ====
1. Murder Games, or Instinct (2017), with Howard Roughan, New York: Little, Brown and Company ISBN 0316273961
2. Killer Instinct (2019), with Howard Roughan
3. Steal (2022), with Howard Roughan

==== Billy Harney series ====
1. The Black Book (2017), with David Ellis, New York: Little, Brown and Company ISBN 978-1-455-54267-3
2. The Red Book (2021), with David Ellis, New York: Little, Brown and Company ISBN 978-0-316-49940-8
3. Escape (2022), with David Ellis, New York: Little, Brown and Company

==== Rory Yates series ====
1. Texas Ranger (2018), with Andrew Bourelle, New York: Little, Brown and Company ISBN 978-0-316-55668-2
2. Texas Outlaw (2020), with Andrew Bourelle
3. The Texas Murders (2025), with Andrew Bourelle

==== Amy Cornwall series ====
1. Out of Sight or The Cornwalls are gone (2019), with Brendan DuBois ISBN 978-1-538-73157-4
2. Countdown (2023), with Brendan DuBois ISBN 978-0-316-45737-8

==== Shadow series ====
1. The Shadow (2021), with Brian Sitts, Grand Central Publishing ISBN 978-1-538-70393-9
2. Circle of Death (2023), with Brian Sitts, Grand Central Publishing ISBN 978-1-538-71111-8

==== Two Sisters Detective Agency series ====
1. 2 Sisters Detective Agency (2021), with Candice Fox, Little, Brown and Company ISBN 978-1538704585
2. 2 Sisters Murder Investigations: A Thriller (2025), with Candice Fox, Little, Brown and Company ISBN 978-1538758496

==== Murder Runs in the Family series ====
1. The House of Wolves (2023), with Mike Lupica, New York: Little, Brown and Company ISBN 978-0-316-40429-7

==== Stand-alones ====
- The Thomas Berryman Number (1976), Boston: Little, Brown and Company ISBN 0-446-60045-8
- Season of the Machete (1977), New York: Warner Books ISBN 0-446-60047-4
- See How They Run, or The Jericho Commandment (1979), New York: Warner Books ISBN 1-56865-423-5
- Virgin, or Cradle and All (1980), New York: McGraw Hill ISBN 0-07-048820-7
- Black Market, or Black Friday (1986), New York: Simon and Schuster ISBN 0-671-61087-2
- The Midnight Club (1989), Boston: Little, Brown and Company ISBN 0-316-69363-4
- Hide & Seek (1996), Boston: Little, Brown and Company ISBN 0-316-69386-3
- Suzanne's Diary for Nicholas (2001), Boston: Little, Brown and Company ISBN 0-316-96944-3
- The Beach House (2002), with Peter de Jonge, Boston: Little, Brown and Company ISBN 0-316-96968-0
- The Jester (2003), with Andrew Gross, Boston: Little, Brown and Company ISBN 0-316-60205-1
- Sam's Letters to Jennifer (2004), New York: Little, Brown and Company ISBN 0-316-71057-1
- Lifeguard (2005), with Andrew Gross, New York: Little, Brown and Company ISBN 0-316-05785-1
- Beach Road (2006), with Peter de Jonge, New York: Little, Brown and Company ISBN 0-316-15978-6
- Judge and Jury (2006), with Andrew Gross, New York: Little, Brown and Company ISBN 0-316-01393-5
- The Quickie (2007), with Michael Ledwidge, New York: Little, Brown and Company ISBN 978-0-316-11736-4
- You've Been Warned (2007), with Howard Roughan, New York: Little, Brown and Company ISBN 978-0-316-01450-2
- Sail (2008), with Howard Roughan, New York: Little, Brown and Company ISBN 978-0-316-01870-8
- Sundays at Tiffany's (2008), with Gabrielle Charbonnet, New York: Little, Brown and Company ISBN 978-0-316-01477-9
- Swimsuit (2009), with Maxine Paetro, New York: Little, Brown and Company ISBN 978-0-316-01877-7
- Don't Blink (2010), with Howard Roughan, New York: Little, Brown and Company ISBN 978-0-316-03623-8
- The Postcard Killers (2010), with Liza Marklund, New York: Little, Brown and Company ISBN 978-0-316-08951-7
- Bloody Valentine (2011), with K.A. John, London: Arrow Books ISBN 978-0-09-955675-6
- Kill Me If You Can (2011), with Marshall Karp, New York: Little, Brown and Company ISBN 978-0-316-09754-3
- Now You See Her (2011), with Michael Ledwidge, New York: Little, Brown and Company ISBN 978-0-316-03621-4
- The Christmas Wedding (2011), with Richard DiLallo, New York: Little, Brown and Company ISBN 978-0-316-09739-0
- Toys (2011), with Neil McMahon, New York: Little, Brown and Company ISBN 978-0-316-09736-9
- Guilty Wives (2012), with David Ellis, New York: Little, Brown and Company ISBN 978-0-316-09756-7
- Mistress (2013), with David Ellis, New York: Little, Brown and Company ISBN 978-0-316-21107-9
- The Murder House (2015), with David Ellis, New York: Little, Brown and Company ISBN 978-0-316-41098-4
- Truth or Die (2015), with Howard Roughan, New York: Little, Brown and Company ISBN 978-0-316-40701-4
- Woman of God (2016), with Maxine Paetro, New York: Little, Brown and Company ISBN 978-0-316-27402-9
- Black Dress Affair (2017), with Susan DiLallo, New York: BookShots ISBN 978-0-316-55440-4
- Expelled (2017), with Emily Raymond, Jimmy Patterson ISBN 978-0-316-44039-4
- The Store (2017), with Richard DiLallo, Little, Brown and Company ISBN 978-0-316-39545-8
- Juror No. 3, or Juror #3 (2018), with Nancy Allen, New York: Knopf & Little, Brown and Company ISBN 978-0-316-47412-2
- The 13-Minute Murder (2018), with Shan Serafin, New York: Grand Central Publishing ISBN 978-0-316-51100-1
- The First Lady (2018), with Brendan DuBois, New York: Knopf & Little, Brown and Company ISBN 1-538-71495-7
- The President Is Missing (2018), with Bill Clinton, New York: Knopf & Little, Brown and Company ISBN 978-0-316-41269-8
- The Cornwalls Are Gone (2019), with Brendan DuBois, New York: Little, Brown and Company ISBN 0-316-48555-1
- The Inn (2019), with Candice Fox, Little, Brown and Company ISBN 978-0-316-52758-3
- The Warning (2019), with Robison Wells, Little, Brown and Company ISBN 978-1-538-73252-6
- Lost (2020), with James O. Born, Little, Brown and Company
- The Summer House (2020), with Brendan DuBois, Little, Brown and Company ISBN 978-0-31653-955-5
- 1st Case (2020), with Chris Tebbetts, Little, Brown and Company ISBN 978-0-31641-818-8
- Cajun Justice (2020), with Tucker Axum, Grand Central Publishing ISBN 978-1-53875-235-7
- The Coast-to-Coast Murders (2020), with J. D. Barker
- The Midwife Murders (2020), with Richard DiLallo, Grand Central Publishing ISBN 978-1-53871-888-9
- Three Women Disappear (2020), with Shan Serafin, New York: Little, Brown and Company ISBN 978-0-31654-161-9
- The President's Daughter (2021), with Bill Clinton, Little, Brown and Company ISBN 978-0-316-54071-1
- The Noise: A Thriller (2021), with J. D. Barker, Little, Brown and Company
- Run, Rose, Run (2022), with Dolly Parton, Little, Brown and Company ISBN 978-0-759-55434-4
- Death of the Black Widow (2022), with J. D. Barker, Grand Central Publishing ISBN 978-1-538-70982-5
- Blowback (2022), with Brendan DuBois, Little, Brown and Company ISBN 978-0-316-49963-7
- The Horsewoman (2022), with Mike Lupica, Little, Brown and Company ISBN 978-0-316-49977-4
- The Twelve Topsy-Turvy, Very Messy Days of Christmas (2022), with Tad Safran, Little, Brown and Company ISBN 978-0-316-40600-0
- Lion & Lamb (2023), with Duane Swierczynski, Little, Brown and Company ISBN 978-0-316-40489-1
- 12 Months to Live (2023), with Mike Lupica, Little, Brown and Company ISBN 978-0-316-40569-0
- Holmes, Marple & Poe: The Greatest Crime-Solving Team of the Twenty-First Century (2024), with Brian Sitts, Little, Brown and Company ISBN 978-0-316-405195
- The #1 Lawyer (2024), with Nancy Allen, Little, Brown and Company ISBN 978-0-316-499675
- Eruption (2024), with Michael Crichton, Little, Brown and Company ISBN 978-0-316-565073
- Hard To Kill (2024), with Mike Lupica, Little, Brown and Company ISBN 978-0-316-569910
- The Writer (2025), with J.D. Barker, Little, Brown and Company ISBN 978-0-316-570008
- The First Gentleman (2025), with Bill Clinton, Little, Brown and Company ISBN 978-0-316-565103
- The Hamptons Lawyer (2025), with Mike Lupica, Little, Brown and Company ISBN 978-0-316-569941
- Billion Dollar Ransom (2025), with Duane Swierczynski, Little, Brown and Company ISBN 978-0-316-570022
- The Most Dangerous Games (2026), with MrBeast, HarperCollins ISBN 978-0-063-488762

=== Short stories ===
==== Collections ====
- Triple Threat (2016), with Max DiLallo and Andrew Bourelle, collection of 3 novellas:
  "Cross Kill" (Alex Cross series), "Zoo 2" (Zoo series #1.5), "The Pretender"
- Kill or Be Killed (2016), with Maxine Paetro, Emily Raymond, Rees Jones and Shan Serafin, collection of 4 novellas:
  "The Trial" (Women's Murder Club series #15.5), "Little Black Dress", "Heist", "The Women's War"
- The Moores are Missing (2017), with Loren D. Estleman, Sam Hawken and Ed Chatterton, collection of 3 novellas:
  "The Moores are Missing", "The Housewife", "Absolute Zero"
- The Moores Are Missing (2017), with Loren D. Estleman and Lee Stone, collection of 3 novellas:
  "The Moores are Missing", "Kill and Tell", "Dead Heat"
- Two From the Heart (2017), with Emily Raymond, Frank Constantini and Brian Sitts, collection of 2 novellas:
  "Tell Me Your Best Story", "The Lifesaver"
- The Family Lawyer (2017), with Robert Rotstein, Christopher Charles and Rachel Howzell Hall, collection of 3 novellas:
  "The Family Lawyer", "Night Sniper", "The Good Sister"
- Triple Homicide (2017), with Maxine Paetro and James O. Born, collection of 3 novellas:
  "Detective Cross" (Alex Cross series), "The Medical Examiner" (Women's Murder Club series #16.5), "Manhunt" (Michael Bennett series #10.5)
- Murder in Paradise (2018), with Doug Allyn, Connor Hyde and Duane Swierczynski, collection of 3 novellas:
  "The Lawyer Lifeguard", "The Doctor's Plot", "The Shut-In"
- The House Next Door (2019), with Susan DiLallo, Max DiLallo and Tim Arnold, New York: Grand Central Publishing ISBN 978-1538730805, collection of 3 novellas:
  "The House Next Door", "The Killer's Wife", "We. Are. Not. Alone"

==== Novellas ====
===== Jon Roscoe Thriller series =====
1. "The Hostage" (2016), with Robert Gold
2. "The Verdict" (2016), with Robert Gold
3. "Kidnapped" (2016), with Robert Gold

===== Detective Luc Moncrief series =====
1. "French Kiss" (2016), with Richard DiLallo
2. "The Christmas Mystery" (2016), with Richard DiLallo
3. "French Twist" (2017), with Richard DiLallo

===== Owen Taylor series =====
1. "The End" (2017), with Brendan DuBois
2. "After the End" (2017), with Brendan DuBois

===== Mitchum series =====
1. "Hidden" (2017), with James O. Born
2. "Malicious" (2017), with James O. Born
3. "Malevolent" (2020), with James O. Born
- Omnibus: The River Murders (2020), with James O. Born

===== Stand-alones =====
- "Action" (2014), with Brent Gargan, short story (Alex Cross series)
- "$10,000,000 Marriage Proposal" (2016), with Hilary Liftin
- "113 Minutes" (2016), with Max DiLallo
- "Airport: Code Red" (2016), with Michael White, Penguin ISBN 978-1786530370
- "Black & Blue" (2016), with Candice Fox (Detective Harriet Blue series #0.5)
- "Break Point" (2016), with Lee Stone, Bookshots ISBN 978-1786530134
- "Chase" (2016), with Michael Ledwidge (Michael Bennett series #9.5)
- "Come and Get Us" (2016), with Shan Serafin
- "Cross Kill" (2016) (Alex Cross series)
- "Dead Heat" (2016), with Lee Stone
- "Heist" (2016), with Rees Jones
- "Hunted" (2016), with Andrew Holmes (David Shelley series #0.5)
- "Killer Chef" (2016), with Jeffrey J. Keyes (Caleb Rooney series #0.5)
- "Let's Play Make-Believe" (2016) also known as "The Palm Beach Murders" (2021), with James O. Born, Grand Central Publishing ISBN 978-1-53875-407-8
- "Little Black Dress" (2016), with Emily Raymond
- "Private Royals" (2016), with Rees Jones, Bookshots ISBN 978-1786530172 (Private series #12.5)
- "The Murder of Stephen King" (canceled), with Derek Nikitas
- "Taking the Titanic" (2016), with Scott Slaven
- "The Mating Season" (2016), with Laurie Horowitz
- "The Pretender" (2016), with Andrew Bourelle
- "The Trial" (2016), with Maxine Paetro, New York: Little, Brown and Company ISBN 978-0-316-31715-3 (Women's Murder Club series #15.5)
- "The Women's War" (2016), with Shan Serafin
- "Zoo 2" (2016), with Max DiLallo (Zoo series #1.5)
- "Absolute Zero" (2017), with Ed Chatterton
- "Achilles" (2017)
- "Avalanche" (2017), with David Inglish
- "Christmas Sanctuary" (2017), with Lauren Hawkeye
- "Dead Man Running" (2017), with Christopher Farnsworth
- "Deadly Cargo" (2017), with Will Jordan, Bookshots ISBN 978-1786531766
- "Detective Cross" (2017) (Alex Cross series)
- "Diary of a Succubus" (2017), with Derek Nikitas
- "Kill and Tell" (2017), with Scott Slaven
- "Love Me Tender" (2017), with Laurie Horowitz
- "Manhunt" (2017), with James O. Born (Michael Bennett series #10.5)
- "Night Sniper" (2017), with Christopher Charles
- "Nooners" (2017)
- "Private Gold" (2017), with Jassy Mackenzie (Private series #13.5)
- "Scott Free" (2017), with Rob Hart
- "Stealing Gulfstreams" (2017), with Max DiLallo
- "Steeplechase" (2017), with Scott Slaven
- "Stingrays" (2017)
- "Tell Me Your Best Story" (2017), with Emily Raymond
- "The Dolls" (2017), with Kecia Bal
- "The Exile" (2017), with Alison Joseph
- "The Family Lawyer" (2017), with Robert Rotstein
- "The Good Sister" (2017), with Rachel Howzell Hall
- "The Housewife" (2017), with Sam Hawken
- "The House Husband" (2017), with Duane Swierczynski
- "The Lawyer Lifeguard" (2017), with Doug Allyn
- "The Lifesaver" (2017), with Frank Constantini and Brian Sitts
- "The Medical Examiner" (2017), with Maxine Paetro (Women's Murder Club series #16.5)
- "The Moores are Missing" (2017), with Loren D. Estleman
- "The Shut-In" (2017), with Duane Swierczynski
- "You've Been Warned" (2017), with Derek Nikitas
- "The Doctor's Plot" (2018), with Connor Hyde
- "The House Next Door" (2019), with Susan DiLallo
- "The Killer's Wife" (2019), with Max DiLallo
- "We. Are. Not. Alone" (2019), with Tim Arnold

== Fiction written for young adults ==
=== Novels ===
==== Maximum Ride / Hawk series ====
- Maximum Ride series:
  1. The Angel Experiment (2005), New York: Little, Brown and Company ISBN 978-0-316-15556-4
  2. School's Out – Forever (2006), New York: Little, Brown and Company ISBN 978-0-316-15559-5
  3. Saving the World and Other Extreme Sports (2007), New York: Little, Brown and Company ISBN 978-0-316-15560-1
  4. The Final Warning (2008), New York: Little, Brown and Company ISBN 978-0-316-00286-8
  5. MAX (2009), New York: Little, Brown and Company ISBN 978-0-316-00289-9
  6. Fang (2010), New York: Little, Brown and Company ISBN 978-0-316-03619-1
  7. Angel (2011), New York: Little, Brown and Company ISBN 978-0-316-03620-7
  8. Nevermore (2012), New York: Little, Brown and Company ISBN 978-0-316-10184-4
  9. Maximum Ride Forever (2015), New York: Little, Brown and Company ISBN 978-0-316-20750-8
- Maximum Ride: Hawk series:
  1. Hawk (2020), with Gabrielle Charbonnet, New York: Little, Brown and Company ISBN 978-0-316-49440-3
  2. City of the Dead (2021), with Mindy McGinnis, New York: Little, Brown and Company ISBN 978-0-316-50015-9

==== Daniel X series ====
1. The Dangerous Days of Daniel X (2008), with Michael Ledwidge, New York: Little, Brown and Company ISBN 978-0-316-00292-9
  1.5. Daniel X: Alien Hunter (2008), with Leopoldo Gout, comic
2. Watch the Skies (2009), with Ned Rust, New York: Little, Brown and Company ISBN 978-0-316-03618-4
3. Demons and Druids (2010), with Adam Sadler, New York: Little, Brown and Company ISBN 978-0-316-03698-6
4. Game Over (2011), with Ned Rust, New York: Little, Brown and Company ISBN 978-0-316-10178-3
5. Armageddon (2012), with Chris Grabenstein, New York: Little, Brown and Company ISBN 978-0-316-10179-0
6. Lights Out (2015), with Chris Grabenstein, New York: Little, Brown and Company ISBN 978-0-316-20745-4

==== Witch & Wizard series ====
1. Witch & Wizard (2009), with Gabrielle Charbonnet, New York: Little, Brown and Company ISBN 978-0-316-03624-5
2. The Gift (2010), with Ned Rust, New York: Little, Brown and Company ISBN 978-0-316-03625-2
3. The Fire (2011), with Jill Dembowski, New York: Little, Brown and Company ISBN 978-0-316-10190-5
4. The Kiss (2013), with Jill Dembowski, New York: Little, Brown and Company ISBN 978-0-316-10191-2
5. The Lost (2014), with Emily Raymond, New York: Little, Brown and Company ISBN 978-0-316-20770-6

==== Confessions series ====
1. Confessions of a Murder Suspect (2012), with Maxine Paetro, New York: Little, Brown and Company ISBN 978-0-316-20698-3
2. Confessions: The Private School Murders (2013), with Maxine Paetro, New York; Boston: Little, Brown and Company ISBN 978-0-316-20765-2
3. Confessions: The Paris Mysteries (2014), with Maxine Paetro, New York: Little, Brown and Company ISBN 978-0-316-37084-4
4. Confessions: The Murder of an Angel (2015), with Maxine Paetro, New York; Boston: Little, Brown and Company ISBN 978-0-316-30102-2

==== Stand-alones ====
- First Love (2014), with Emily Raymond, New York: Little, Brown and Company ISBN 978-0-316-20704-1
- Homeroom Diaries (2014), with Lisa Papademetriou, illustrated by Keino, New York: Little, Brown and Company ISBN 978-0-316-20762-1
- Humans, Bow Down (2016), with Emily Raymond, Jill Dembowski, illustrated by Alexander Ovchinnikov, New York: Little, Brown and Company ISBN 978-0-316-34696-2
- Sophia, Princess Among Beasts (2019), with Emily Raymond

=== Comics ===
==== Maximum Ride: The Manga series ====
1. Maximum Ride, Vol. 1 (2009), with NaRae Lee
2. Maximum Ride, Vol. 2 (2009), with NaRae Lee
3. Maximum Ride, Vol. 3 (2010), with NaRae Lee
4. Maximum Ride, Vol. 4 (2011), with NaRae Lee
5. Maximum Ride, Vol. 5 (2011), with NaRae Lee
6. Maximum Ride, Vol. 6 (2012), with NaRae Lee
7. Maximum Ride, Vol. 7 (2013), with NaRae Lee
8. Maximum Ride, Vol. 8 (2014), with NaRae Lee
9. Maximum Ride, Vol. 9 (2015), with NaRae Lee
10. Maximum Ride, Vol. 10 (expected publication: 2020), with NaRae Lee
11. Maximum Ride, Vol. 11 (2018), with NaRae Lee

==== Daniel X: The Manga series ====
1. Daniel X: The Manga, Vol 1 (2010), with Michael Ledwidge and Seung-Hui Kye
2. Daniel X: The Manga, Vol 2 (2011), with Ned Rust and Seung-Hui Kye
3. Daniel X: The Manga, Vol 3 (2012), with Adam Sadler and Seung-Hui Kye

==== Witch & Wizard series ====
===== Witch & Wizard Graphic Novel series =====
1. Battle for Shadowland (2010), with Dara Naraghi
2. Operation Zero (2011), with Víctor Santos

===== Witch & Wizard: The Manga series =====
1. Witch & Wizard: The Manga, Vol. 1 (2011), with Gabrielle Charbonnet
2. Witch & Wizard: The Manga, Vol. 2 (2012), with Ned Rust
3. Witch & Wizard: The Manga, Vol. 3 (2013), with Jill Dembowski

==== Stand-alones ====
Zoo: The Graphic Novel (2012), with Michael Ledwidge

== Fiction written for children ==
=== Novels ===
==== Middle School series ====
1. The Worst Years of My Life (2011), with Christopher Tebbets, illustrated by Laura Park, New York: Little, Brown and Company ISBN 978-0-316-10187-5
2. Get Me Out of Here! (2012), with Christopher Tebbets, illustrated by Laura Park, New York: Little, Brown and Company ISBN 978-0-316-20671-6
3. My Brother Is a Big, Fat Liar (2013), with Lisa Papademetriou, illustrated by Neil Swaab, New York: Little, Brown and Company ISBN 978-0-316-20754-6
4. How I Survived Bullies, Broccoli, and Snake Hill (2013), with Christopher Tebbets, illustrated by Laura Park, New York: Little, Brown and Company ISBN 978-0-316-23175-6
5. Ultimate Showdown (2014), with Julia Bergen, illustrated by Alec Longstreth, New York: Little, Brown and Company ISBN 978-0-316-32211-9
  5.5. How I Got Lost in London (2014)
6. Save Rafe! (2014), with Christopher Tebbets, illustrated by Laura Park, New York: Little, Brown and Company ISBN 978-0-316-32212-6
7. Just My Rotten Luck (2015), with Christopher Tebbets, illustrated by Laura Park, New York: Little, Brown and Company ISBN 978-0-316-28477-6
  7.25. Rafe's Aussie Adventure (2015)
  7.5. Going Bush (2016), with Martin Chatterton
8. Dog's Best Friend (2016), with Christopher Tebbets, illustrated by Jomike Tejido, New York: Little, Brown and Company ISBN 978-0-316-34954-3
  - Middle School: Hollywood 101 (2016), with Martin Chatterton
9. Escape to Australia (2017), with Martin Chatterton, illustrated by Daniel Griffo, New York: Little, Brown and Company ISBN 978-0-316-27262-9
  - Middle School: G'day, America (2018), with Martin Chatterton
10. From Hero to Zero (2018), with Christopher Tebbets
11. Born to Rock (2019), with Christopher Tebbets
12. Master of Disaster (2020), with Christopher Tebbets
13. Field Trip Fiasco (2021), with Martin Chatterton ISBN 978-1-549-18629-5
14. It's a Zoo in Here! (2022), with Brian Sitts

==== Ali Cross trilogy ====
1. Ali Cross (2020)
2. Like Father Like Son (2021)
3. The Secret Detective (2022)

==== I Funny series ====
1. I Funny (2012), with Chris Grabenstein, illustrated by Laura Park, New York: Little, Brown and Company ISBN 978-0-316-20693-8
2. I Even Funnier (2013), with Chris Grabenstein, illustrated by Laura Park, New York: Little, Brown and Company ISBN 978-0-316-20697-6
3. I Totally Funniest (2015), with Chris Grabenstein, illustrated by Laura Park, New York: Little, Brown and Company ISBN 978-0-316-26161-6
4. I Funny TV (2015), with Chris Grabenstein, illustrated by Laura Park, New York: Little, Brown and Company ISBN 978-0-316-30109-1
5. I Funny: School of Laughs (2017), with Chris Grabenstein, illustrated by Laura Park, New York: Little, Brown and Company
6. The Nerdiest, Wimpiest, Dorkiest I Funny Ever (2018), with Chris Grabenstein

==== Treasure Hunters series ====
1. Treasure Hunters (2013), with Chris Grabenstein and Mark Shulman, illustrated by Juliana Neufeld, New York: Little, Brown and Company ISBN 978-0-316-20756-0
2. Danger Down the Nile (2014), with Chris Grabenstein, illustrated by Juliana Neufeld, New York: Little, Brown and Company ISBN 978-0-316-37086-8
3. Secret of the Forbidden City (2015), with Chris Grabenstein, illustrated by Juliana Neufeld, New York: Little, Brown and Company ISBN 978-0-316-28480-6
4. Peril at the Top of the World (2016), with Chris Grabenstein, illustrated by Juliana Neufeld, New York: Little, Brown and Company ISBN 978-0-316-34693-1
5. Quest for the City of Gold (2017), with Chris Grabenstein
6. All-American Adventure (2019), with Chris Grabenstein
7. The Plunder Down Under (2020), with Chris Grabenstein
8. The Ultimate Quest (2022), with Chris Grabenstein

==== House of Robots series ====
1. House of Robots (2014), with Chris Grabenstein, illustrated by Juliana Neufeld, New York: Little, Brown and Company ISBN 978-0-316-40591-1
2. Robots Go Wild! (2015), with Chris Grabenstein, illustrated by Juliana Neufeld, New York: Little, Brown and Company ISBN 978-0-316-28479-0
3. Robot Revolution! (2017), with Chris Grabenstein, illustrated by Juliana Neufeld, New York: Little, Brown and Company ISBN 978-0-316-34958-1

==== Jacky Ha-Ha series ====
1. Jacky Ha-Ha (2016), with Chris Grabenstein, illustrated by Kerascoët, New York: Little, Brown and Company ISBN 978-0-316-26249-1
2. Jacky Ha-Ha: My Life is a Joke (2017), with Chris Grabenstein, illustrated by Kerascoët, New York: Little, Brown and Company ISBN 978-0-316-50837-7
3. Jacky Ha-Ha Gets the Last Laugh (2023), with Chris Grabenstein, illustrated by Kerascoët, New York: Little, Brown and Company ISBN 978-0-316-41009-0

==== Dog Diaries series ====
1. Dog Diaries (2018), with Steven Butler, New York: Little, Brown and Company ISBN 978-0-316-48748-1
2. Happy Howlidays! (2018), with Steven Butler
3. Mission Impawsible (2019), with Steven Butler
4. Curse of the Mystery Mutt (2019), with Steven Butler
5. Camping Chaos! (2020), with Steven Butler
6. Dinosaur Disaster (2022), with Steven Butler

==== Max Einstein series ====
1. The Genius Experiment (2018), with Chris Grabenstein, New York: Little, Brown and Company ISBN 978-0316523967
2. Rebels With A Cause (2019), with Chris Grabenstein
3. Saves the Future (2020), with Chris Grabenstein

==== Katt Dogg series ====
1. Katt vs. Dogg (2019), with Chris Grabenstein
2. Katt Loves Dogg (2021), with Chris Grabenstein

Stand-alones

- Public School Superhero (2015), with Christopher Tebbetts, illustrated by Cory Thomas, New York: Little, Brown and Company ISBN 978-0-316-32214-0
- Word of Mouse (2016), with Chris Grabenstein, illustrated by Joe Sutphin, New York: Little, Brown and Company ISBN 978-0-316-34956-7
- Pottymouth and Stoopid (2016), illustrated by Chris Grabenstein
- Laugh Out Loud (2017), with Chris Grabenstein
- Not So Normal Norbert (2018), with Joey Green, New York: Knopf & Little, Brown and Company
- Unbelievably Boring Bart (2018), with Duane Swierczynski, New York: Knopf & Little, Brown and Company ISBN 978-0316411530
- Becoming Muhammad Ali (2020), with Kwame Alexander
- Best Nerds Forever (2021), with Chris Grabenstein

=== Short stories ===
- "Boys Will Be Boys" (2011), Guys Read series, New York: Walden Pond Press ISBN 978-0-06-211215-6

=== Picture books ===
==== Little Geniuses series ====
1. Big Words for Little Geniuses (2017), with Susan Patterson, illustrated by Hsinping Pan, picture book, New York: Little, Brown and Company ISBN 978-0-316-50294-8
2. Cuddly Critters for Little Geniuses (2018), with Susan Patterson, illustrated by Hsinping Pan, picture book, New York: JIMMY Patterson Books, Little, Brown and Company ISBN 978-0-316-48628-6

==== Stand-alones ====
- SantaKid (2004), illustrated by Michael Garland, picture book, New York: Little, Brown and Company ISBN 978-0-316-00061-1
- Give Please a Chance (2016), with Bill O'Reilly, picture book
- Give Thank You a Try (2017), picture book
- Penguins of America (2017), picture book
- The Candies Save Christmas (2017), picture book
- The Candies Trick or Treat (2018), picture book
- Elephant Goes Potty (2023), illustrated by Sydney Hanson

== Comics ==
- Jacky Ha-Ha: A Graphic Novel (2020), with Chris Grabenstein
- Jacky Ha-Ha: My Life is a Joke: A Graphic Novel (2021), with Chris Grabenstein

== Non-fiction ==
=== Biographies ===
- Torn Apart (2008), with Hal Friedman
- Against Medical Advice: A True Story (2008), with Hal Friedman, memoirs, New York: Little, Brown and Company ISBN 978-0-316-02475-4
- Med Head: My Knock-down, Drag-out, Drugged-up Battle with My Brain (2010), with Hal Friedman, memoirs, New York: Little, Brown and Company ISBN 978-0-316-07617-3
- The House of Kennedy (2020), with Cynthia Fagen
- with Sherman, Casey; Wedge, Dave (2020). The Last Days of John Lennon. New York: Little, Brown and Company. ISBN 978-0-316-42907-8.
- with Eversmann, Matt; Mooney, Chris (2021). E.R. Nurse. New York: Little, Brown and Company. ISBN 978-0-759-55426-9.
- Walk in My Combat Boots: True Stories from America's Bravest Warriors (2021), with Matt Eversmann, and Chris Mooney, Little, Brown and Company
- with Edwards-Jones, Imogen (2025). The Last Days of Marilyn Monroe: A True Crime Thriller. Little, Brown and Company. ISBN 9780316580519.

History

- The Murder of King Tut (2009), with Martin Dugard, New York: Little, Brown and Company ISBN 978-0-316-03404-3

=== Politics ===
- Trump vs. Clinton: In Their Own Words (2016), Bookshots ISBN 978-0316546508

=== Sociology ===
- The Day America Told the Truth (1991), with Peter Kim, New York: Prentice Hall Press ISBN 978-0134634807
- The Second American Revolution: The People's Plan for Fixing America-Before Its Too Late (1994), with Peter Kim, New York: William Morrow and Company ISBN 978-0688117306

=== True events ===
- Filthy Rich (2016), with John Connolly and Tim Malloy, New York: Little, Brown and Company ISBN 978-0-316-27405-0
- All-American Murder: The Rise and Fall of Aaron Hernandez, the Superstar Whose Life Ended on Murderers' Row (2018), with Alex Abramovich and Mike Harvkey
- Discovery's Murder is Forever also known as Investigation Discovery's True Crime series:
  1. Murder, Interrupted (2018), Grand Central Publishing ISBN 978-1-538-74472-7
  2. Home Sweet Murder (2018), Grand Central Publishing ISBN 978-1-538-74481-9
  3. Murder Beyond The Grave (2018), Grand Central Publishing ISBN 978-1-538-74482-6
  4. Murder Thy Neighbor (2020), Grand Central Publishing ISBN 978-1-538-75241-8
  5. Murder of Innocence (2020), Grand Central Publishing ISBN 978-1-538-75244-9
  6. Till Murder Do Us Part (2021), Grand Central Publishing ISBN 978-1-53875-251-7

=== Memoir ===
- James Patterson by James Patterson: The Stories of My Life (2022): Little, Brown and Company ISBN 978-0-316-39753-7
