= Lindsay Boxer =

- Women's Murder Club character
- First appearance: 1st to Die
- Created by: James Patterson
- Portrayed by: Tracy Pollan; Angie Harmon

In-universe information
- Gender: Female
- Occupation: Police detective
- Nationality: American

Lindsay Boxer is the main character of the novel series Women's Murder Club written by James Patterson and Maxine Paetro. The series is based on fictional characters and police cases in San Francisco.

== Character overview ==
When the series begins, Lindsay Boxer is a 34-year-old divorced San Francisco Police Inspector. She lives alone in an apartment in the Potrero Hill neighbourhood of San Francisco with her beloved Border Collie, Martha. She was married for three years to her college sweetheart, whom she later describes as the brother she never had.

In 1st to Die, she is diagnosed with Negli's aplastic anaemia, a blood disease related to leukaemia. Her off-and-on partner on the force is Warren Jacobi, who, despite having ten more years of experience, is subordinate to her. Part way through the book, she gets a new partner, Chris Raleigh, who is an ex-cop and a media-containment specialist for the Mayor. After opening up her heart and bed to him, he is murdered. In the following books, she starts dating Joe Molinari, Deputy Director of Homeland Security. She has a sister named Cat and two nieces, Brigid and Meredith. Her mother died of cancer when she was 24. Her father, Marty Boxer, left the family when Lindsay was thirteen; and she's seen him only twice since. When he shows up on her doorstep in book 2, she lets him in, only to be betrayed again.

In book 2, 2nd Chance, Lindsay is promoted to Chief of Homicide, her dream since she was in the Academy.

In book 4, 4th of July, she is suspended based on false charges of police brutality. When leads in her case about the murdered newlyweds dry up (1st to Die), she decides to talk to her best friend, forensic-pathologist Claire Washburn, and new-found friend reporter Cindy Thomas to try to figure out what she overlooked. After a while, they add another member to this little club, Jill Bernhart-Mayer, Assistant District Attorney. Their favourite place to meet is a restaurant–bar named Suzie's where they go for the atmosphere, the spicy foods, and the margaritas. Suzie's is the birthplace of the Women's Murder Club, which the four women form. The Women's Murder Club is their own version of detective work. This is when they discuss cases, off the books. After the death of Jill (3rd Degree), they welcome another attorney to the group, Yuki Castellano.

The series follows Lindsay's life, and there is a significant milestone in most of the books. In 11th Hour, she is pregnant; and in 12th of Never, she gives birth to her daughter.

== List of novels ==
1. 1st to Die (2001)
2. 2nd Chance (2002)
3. 3rd Degree (2004)
4. 4th of July (2005)
5. The 5th Horseman (2006)
6. The 6th Target (2007
7. 7th Heaven (2008)
8. The 8th Confession (2009)
9. The 9th Judgment (2010)
10. 10th Anniversary (2011)
11. 11th Hour (2012)
12. 12th of Never (2013)
13. Unlucky 13 (2014)
14. 14th Deadly Sin (2015)
15. 15th Affair (2016)
16. The Trial (2016), novella
17. 16th Seduction (2017)
18. The Medical Examiner (2017), novella
19. 17th Suspect (2018)
20. 18th Abduction (2019)
21. 19th Christmas (2019)
22. The 20th Victim (2020)
23. 21st Birthday (2021)
24. 22 Seconds (2022)

== Adaptations ==
The character has been played by Tracy Pollan in the 2003 telemovie First to Die, and by Angie Harmon in the 2007-08 TV series Women's Murder Club.
