= Carolyn McCormick =

American actress

- Occupation: Actress
- Years active: 1985–present
- Known for: Law & Order; 11001001; Future Imperfect; You Know My Name; Enemy Mine
- Spouse: Byron Jennings (m. 1994)
- Children: 2
- Website: www.carolynmccormick.com

Carolyn McCormick is an American actress who played roles in both feature films and on television programs, including Dr. Elizabeth Olivet in the Law & Order franchise.

== Life and career ==
McCormick has worked in television, movies, theatre, and voice acting.

Her breakthrough role was in Enemy Mine, directed by Wolfgang Petersen with Dennis Quaid. Her other film credits include Woody Allen's Whatever Works, You Know My Name with Sam Elliott, and A Simple Twist of Fate with Steve Martin. She played Hannah's Mom in Barney's Night Before Christmas. Her first notable television credit was as district attorney Rita Fiori in Spenser: For Hire, in 1986–1987. She appeared as the holodeck simulation Minuet in "11001001", a first-season episode of Star Trek: The Next Generation, and later as Minuet (William Riker's holodeck love interest) in a fantasy-alternate universe during the fourth-season episode "Future Imperfect".

McCormick starred as Dr. Elizabeth Olivet, a consulting psychologist for the prosecution on Law & Order. She appeared in approximately half of the episodes of the NBC series between 1994 and 2006.

In 1997, McCormick acted as the unhappy wife of a police psychiatrist, played by Robert Pastorelli, in the short-lived Americanized version of the British series Cracker. She has been a guest star on series including Madam Secretary, Elementary, Blue Bloods, Judging Amy, The Practice, Body of Proof, Cold Case, Homicide: Life on the Street, L.A. Law, and Boston Blue.

McCormick also performs on stage. She appeared at the Off-Broadway Cherry Lane Theatre in Eve-olution with The Cosby Show star Sabrina Le Beauf in 2004. She has also appeared in Dinner with Friends, Oedipus, Ancestral Voices, The Donahue Sisters, Laureen's Whereabouts and In Perpetuity. She worked with Thomas Kail at The Flea Theatre in A. R. Gurney's Family Furniture (2013). In 2015, she appeared in Vanya, Sonya, Masha and Spike at the PaperMill Playhouse and What I Did Last Summer at the Signature 2015. She appeared in the Broadway productions of The Dinner Party in 2001 as Mariette Levieux, Private Lives (standby) in 2002, and in Equus in 2008 as Dora Strang. In 2012, McCormick appeared opposite her husband Byron Jennings in the Off-Broadway production of Ten Chimneys. She appeared Off-Broadway in Will Eno's play The Open House in 2014 (Lucille Lortel nomination, Drama Desk Award). She has narrated both audio books, including the Hunger Games series, and Ken Burns documentaries.

== Filmography ==
=== Film ===
Year	Title	Role	Notes
1985	Enemy Mine	Morse	
1993	Rain Without Thunder	Reporter	
1994	A Simple Twist of Fate	Elaine McCann	
1999	You Know My Name	Zoe	
2002	Emmett's Mark	Mrs. Carlin	
2002	This Is Not a Chair	Mrs. Morrison	Short
2005	Loverboy	Ruth, The Realtor	
2006	Spectropia	Verna	
2008	Proud Iza	Alice Monaco	Short
2008	Nights in Rodanthe	Jenny	
2009	Whatever Works	Jessica	
2010	True Nature	Becky Pascal	
2011	Downtown Express	Marie	
2011	The Miraculous Year	The Realtor	
2013	That Thing with the Cat	Krystal	
2015	The Shells	Maryann Marzena	
2015	The Real American	Eleanor	Short
2016	Equity	Naomi's Doctor	Uncredited
2017	Maggie Black	Elizabeth	
2017	The Post	Mrs. McNamara	
2018	Mapplethorpe	Joan Mapplethorpe	
2018	Huntress		Short
2020	Killer Daddy Issues	Grace	
2021	The Last Thing Mary Saw	Agnes	
2025	Candlewood	Maude Sherman	

=== Television ===
Year	Title	Role	Notes
1986	D.C. Cops	Deborah Matheson	TV movie
1986–1987	Spenser: For Hire	Assistant District Attorney Rita Fiori	Main cast (season 2)
1988–1990	Star Trek: The Next Generation	Minuet	2 episodes
1991–2009	Law & Order	Dr. Elizabeth Olivet	Recurring role
1996	Homicide: Life on the Street	Linda Mariner	2 episodes
1997–1999	Cracker	Judith Fitzgerald	16 episodes
1998	The Warlord: Battle for the Galaxy	Rula Kor	TV movie
1999–2001, 2013–2018	Law & Order: Special Victims Unit	Dr. Elizabeth Olivet	Recurring role
2001	Women Docs	The Narrator	Unknown episodes
2001–2004	Judging Amy	Assistant Attorney General Ellis Bonham	3 episodes
2005	Law & Order: Trial by Jury	Dr. Elizabeth Olivet	Episode: "Day"
2006	Law & Order: Criminal Intent	Dr. Elizabeth Olivet	2 episodes
2006	Inspector Mom	Becca Lee	TV movie
2007	Cold Case	Elizabeth Stone	Episode: "Torn"
2009	The National Parks: America's Best Idea	Various Historical Figures	Voice
2010	One Life to Live	Judge Burdett	3 episodes
2011	Body of Proof	Gwen Baldwin	Episode: "Dead Man Walking"
2012	The Dust Bowl	Caroline Henderson	Voice; 4 episodes
2013	Blue Bloods	Joyce Powers	Episode: "Warriors"
2014	Mind Games	Victoria Hood	Episode: "Cauliflower Man"
2015	Elementary	Denise Davis	Episode: "All My Exes Live in Essex"
2016	Madam Secretary	White House Doctor	Episode: "Desperate Remedies"
2016	The Interestings	Betsy Wolf	TV movie
2017	The Blacklist: Redemption	Meryl Jensen	Episode: "Kevin Jensen"
2017	Billions	Investment Banker	Episode: "Currency"
2018–2019	Bull	Judge Marion Stalder	2 episodes
2020	The Good Fight	Ingrid Hill	Episode: "The Gang Deals with Alternate Reality"
2020	Ann Rule's A Murder to Remember	Celeste	TV movie
2022	A Holiday Spectacular	Elisabeth Bingham	TV movie
2025	Boston Blue	Winnie Malakov	Episode: "Teammates"

=== Video games ===
Video games
Year	Title	Role	Notes
2000	Deus Ex	Anna Navarre / Janice Reed / Maggie Chow / Agathe / Aimee / Annette / Dr. Brittany Prinzler / Female Clinic Bum / MJ12 Lab Assistant / MJ12 Lab Bio-Weapon Scientist / MJ12 Lab Computer Scientist / MJ12 Lab Genetic Scientist / MJ12 Lab Psionics Scientist / Mole Female	Voice; Credited as Carolyn McCormack

=== Audiobooks ===
Audiobooks
Year	Title	Notes
1999	Carnal Innocence	Author: Nora Roberts
1999	Long After Midnight	Author: Iris Johansen
2000	Sacred Sins	Author: Nora Roberts
2001	Final Target	Author: Iris Johansen; The Wind Dancer Series, book 4
2004	3rd Degree	Authors: James Patterson and Andrew Gross; Women's Murder Club, book 3
2004	Trace	Author: Patricia Cornwell; Kay Scarpetta Mysteries, book 13
2005	4th of July	Author: James Patterson; Women's Murder Club, book 4
2006	The 5th Horseman	Authors: James Patterson and Maxine Paetro; Women's Murder Club, book 5
2006	Shadow Man	Author: Cody McFadyen
2006	The Mephisto Club	Author: Tess Gerritsen; Rizzoli and Isles Series, book 6
2007	The 6th Target	Authors: James Patterson and Maxine Paetro; Women's Murder Club, book 6
2007	Heartsick	Author: Chelsea Cain; Gretchen Lowell Series, book 1
2007	The Bone Garden	Author: Tess Gerritsen
2008	7th Heaven	Authors: James Patterson and Maxine Paetro; Women's Murder Club, book 7
2008	Sweetheart	Author: Chelsea Cain; Gretchen Lowell Series, book 2
2009	The 8th Confession	Author: James Patterson; Women's Murder Club, book 8
2009	Evil at Heart	Author: Chelsea Cain; Gretchen Lowell Series, book 3
2009	The Hunger Games	Author: Suzanne Collins; The Hunger Games, book 1
2009	Catching Fire	Author: Suzanne Collins; The Hunger Games, book 2
2010	The 9th Judgment	The Women's Murder Club, book 9
2010	Mockingjay	Author: Suzanne Collins; The Hunger Games, book 3
2011	10th Anniversary	The Women's Murder Club, book 10
2014	Annihilation	Southern Reach Trilogy, book 1
2014	Acceptance	Southern Reach Trilogy, book 3
2019	Hot Ice	Author: Nora Roberts
