= Women's Murder Club (novel series) =

Book series by James Patterson

- Women's Murder Club books 1–12
- 1st to Die; 2nd Chance; 3rd Degree; 4th of July; The 5th Horseman; The 6th Target; 7th Heaven; The 8th Confession; The 9th Judgment; 10th Anniversary; 11th Hour; 12th of Never; Unlucky 13; 14th Deadly Sin; 15th Affair; 16th Seduction; 17th Suspect; 18th Abduction; 19th Christmas; 20th Victim; 21st Birthday; 22 Seconds; 23rd Midnight; The 24th Hour; 25 Alive; 26 Beauties
- Author: James Patterson, Andrew Gross (books 2 and 3), Maxine Paetro (since book 4)
- Country: United States
- Language: English
- Genre: Thriller
- Publisher: Little, Brown
- Published: March 5, 2001 – present
- Media type: Print (hardcover, paperback)
- No. of books: 26

Women's Murder Club is a series of mystery novels by American author James Patterson. The books are set in San Francisco and feature an ensemble of lead characters.

The books have been adapted into a made-for-TV movie, a television series and several games.

== Details ==
Set in San Francisco, the novels follow a group of women from different professions relating to investigating crime as they work together to solve murders. The series follows the women through their personal issues, including Lindsay Boxer's medical issues, marriage, and pregnancy. The main characters were originally Lindsay Boxer (police officer), Cindy Thomas (reporter), Claire Washburn (medical examiner), and Jill Bernhardt, but later in the series, defense attorney, Yuki Castellano, is introduced.

Every book except 7th Heaven and 10th Anniversary were #1 New York Times Best Sellers.

A New York Times article states that Patterson set The Women's Murder Club in San Francisco to gain more fans on the West Coast, where competitor John Grisham had been leading in book sales.

=== Co-authors ===
Patterson wrote the first novel, 1st to Die. Subsequent novels have been cowritten with Andrew Gross (books 2 and 3) and Maxine Paetro (since book 4). Patterson has also written other books with both of these authors.

=== Books ===
1. 1st to Die
2. 2nd Chance
3. 3rd Degree
4. 4th of July
5. The 5th Horseman
6. The 6th Target
7. 7th Heaven
8. The 8th Confession
9. The 9th Judgment
10. 10th Anniversary
11. 11th Hour
12. 12th of Never
13. Unlucky 13
14. 14th Deadly Sin
15. 15th Affair
  15.5 The Trial, novella
16. 16th Seduction
  16.5 The Medical Examiner, novella
17. 17th Suspect
18. 18th Abduction
19. 19th Christmas
20. The 20th Victim
21. 21st Birthday
22. 22 Seconds
23. 23rd Midnight
  23.5 23 1/2 Lies, novella
24. The 24th Hour
25. 25 Alive
26. 26 Beauties

== Television ==
The first book in the series, 1st to Die, had previously been a TV movie starring Tracy Pollan.

In 2007, the books were adapted into a television police procedural drama by the same name, which ran from October 12, 2007, through May 13, 2008 and starred Angie Harmon.

== Games ==
Four games based on the books have been released for the PC – #1: Death in Scarlet, #2: A Darker Shade of Grey, #3: Twice in a Blue Moon, and #4: Little Black Lies. In addition, a video game called Women's Murder Club: Games of Passion has been released for the Nintendo DS.
