= Women's Murder Club =

Women’s Murder Club is a murder mystery franchise by the author James Patterson. It may refer to:

- Women's Murder Club (novel series)
- Women's Murder Club (TV series)
