= Women's Murder Club (TV series) =

Legal drama TV

- Genre: Police procedural Legal drama
- Based on: Women's Murder Club by James Patterson
- Developed by: Elizabeth Craft; Sarah Fain
- Starring: Angie Harmon; Laura Harris; Paula Newsome; Aubrey Dollar; Tyrees Allen; Linda Park; Rob Estes
- Country of origin: United States
- Original language: English
- No. of seasons: 1
- No. of episodes: 13

Production
- Executive producers: Elizabeth Craft; Sarah Fain; Joe Simpson; James Patterson
- Running time: 60 minutes
- Production companies: Lucky Enough; Paco & Blackjack, Inc. Writer's Workbench Films; Papa Joe Television; Rat Entertainment; 20th Century Fox Television

Original release
- Network: ABC
- Release: October 12, 2007 – May 13, 2008

Women's Murder Club is an American police procedural and legal drama that aired on ABC from October 12, 2007, to May 13, 2008. The series is set in San Francisco, California, and is based on the series of novels by the same name written by James Patterson. Series creators Elizabeth Craft and Sarah Fain also served as executive producers alongside Patterson, Joe Simpson, Brett Ratner, and R. Scott Gemmill. The latter also served as showrunner, with Gretchen J. Berg and Aaron Harberts co-executive producing. The pilot was directed by Scott Winant.

Produced by 20th Century Fox Television, the series first aired on Friday nights at 9:00PM Eastern/8:00PM Central. On October 31, 2007, ABC ordered an additional three scripts.

On March 31, 2008, it was announced that Women's Murder Club would return with three new episodes, beginning on Tuesday April 29, 2008, at 10:00PM Eastern/9:00PM Central, replacing Boston Legal. On May 12, 2008, ABC confirmed that the series would not return for a second season.

== Plot ==
Based on the best-selling series of books by James Patterson and Maxine Paetro, the series revolves around the lives of four women in San Francisco – a homicide detective, an assistant district attorney, a medical examiner, and a newspaper reporter – who come together to use their expertise and talents in their respective fields to solve murder cases. Though they lead distinctly different lives, they are bound together by a strong bond of friendship, which leads the women to realize that pooling their resources during investigations leads to undiscovered clues and answers in both work and their personal lives.

== Cast and characters ==
=== Main cast ===
- Inspector Lindsay Boxer (Angie Harmon) – Lindsay is the principal character of the series. She is a transplant from her native Texas, as noted by Jacobi in "Play Through the Pain." She has a lingering obsession over the "Kiss-Me-Not" killer, whose case she worked for five years; that obsession led to the breakup of her marriage to Tom Hogan. At the end of the first episode, the "Kiss-Me-Not" killer returns, and though the FBI is now in charge of the case, Lindsay has a hard time letting go. In "FBI Guy", she reveals that her attic is full of information on Kiss-Me-Not's victims and that she considers the destruction of her personal life an acceptable exchange for capturing him. She had a miscarriage while she was married to Tom Hogan ("Maybe, Baby"). After having a one-night stand with Tom prior to his wedding to Heather, she has a pregnancy scare, though it turns out she is actually anemic. She owns a dog, Martha, who she adopted after her original owner was murdered.
- Deputy District Attorney Jill Bernhardt (Laura Harris) – Jill is a successful deputy district attorney, who works at City Hall. Her father died when she was eight and she ended up in the foster system some time after her mother remarried ("Blind Dates and Bleeding Hearts"). She has a weak stomach when it comes to gore and vomits often enough at bloody crime scenes that Inspector Boxer usually leaves a barf bag for her. She has a fear of commitment, presumably due to her dislike of her stepfather and her constant shuffling in the foster system.
- Dr. Claire Washburn (Paula Newsome) – Claire is a medical examiner for the San Francisco Police Department. She is happily married, but there is some strain due to her husband's recent injury, which has left him needing a wheelchair. She has two sons.
- Cindy Thomas (Aubrey Dollar) – Cindy is the youngest member of the Women's Murder Club. She works as a crime reporter for the fictional San Francisco Register, though she previously worked the metro section. Her father, whom she idolized, died eighteen months before the events of "Play Through the Pain." She has an eidetic memory. A running joke through the series is whenever she says or does something that hints at her age, someone, usually Jill Bernhardt, asks if she was 12.
- Inspector Warren Jacobi (Tyrees Allen) – Lindsay's loyal partner. He was up for the lieutenant position that went to Tom, but has not expressed much disappointment that he didn't get the job, seeming to prefer field work to the politics of the higher position. He also seems to prefer the finer things in life, having an affinity for wine, 30-year-old whiskey, and opera. He is thrice-divorced and has a child from one of those marriages.
- Lieutenant Tom Hogan (Rob Estes) – Lindsay's ex-husband, who in the first episode was promoted to lieutenant and assigned as her boss. He is engaged in the pilot and has remarried by "To Drag and to Hold," but he still worries that Lindsay's obsession with her work will consume her. Tom was played by Christopher Wiehl in the unaired pilot.
- Deputy District Attorney Denise Kwon (Linda Park) - Jill's immediate superior at the DA's office, she clashes with her over her "bleeding heart" style. She is also antagonistic towards Jill due to her past romantic history with Hanson North. When the show returned after the writers' strike, the first episode credits no longer showed her name. But by the second episode, she was back in the credits as a series regular.

=== Recurring cast ===
- Luke Bowen (Coby Ryan McLaughlin) – Jill's ex-boyfriend. He is an ER doctor at the fictional Mission Cross North. Jill and Luke have recently broken up after he finds that she had slept with Hanson.
- Hanson North (Kyle Secor) – Defense attorney who has a romantic history with Jill and is currently seeing her boss, Denise Kwon.
- Ed Washburn (Jonathan Adams) – Claire's husband. Currently uses a wheelchair full-time after being shot while serving as a police officer.
- Heather Hogan née Donnelly (Ever Carradine) – Tom's new wife. She is a kindergarten teacher who is eco-friendly, planning a green wedding.
- Pete Raynor (Joel Gretsch) – Lindsay's love interest in season 1, who is in town for only two weeks.

== Episodes ==
The complete series was released on manufactured-on-demand DVD on 29 September 2014.

No.	Title	Directed by	Written by	Original release date	Prod. code
0	"Pilot"	Scott Winant	Elizabeth Craft and Sarah Fain	N/A	1ANH79
Lindsay, Claire, Cindy, and Jacobi investigate a series of murders occurring on the victims' wedding anniversaries. Jill prosecutes a man for the murder of his wife. Lindsay faces up to the past when her ex-husband announces he is getting married again and deals with the news that she is going to be the new lieutenant. Differences from the series include Cindy already being part of the club, Lindsay becoming the new lieutenant instead of her ex-husband, the casting of Tom, and the "flower killer" instead of the Kiss Me Not Killer.
1	"Welcome to the Club"	Greg Yaitanes	Elizabeth Craft and Sarah Fain	October 12, 2007	1ANH01
Lindsay, Claire, Jill, and Jacobi investigate the murder of a prominent San Francisco reporter, and get unexpected help from the victim's co-worker, who has an interest in serial killers. In their private lives, Lindsay faces up to the past when her ex-husband is brought into her police department in a leadership role, and Jill faces a domestic crisis.
2	"Train In Vain"	Michael Fields	Barbara Hall	October 19, 2007	1ANH02
Lindsay and Jacobi hunt down a killer who committed a triple homicide on a subway car, and discover a disturbing twist in the killer's motive. Cindy tries to gain the respect of The Club. Jill prepares to move in with Luke. Claire helps Ed through his recovery. Lindsay meets Tom's fiancée.
3	"Blind Dates and Bleeding Hearts"	Sarah Pia Anderson	Gretchen J. Berg and Aaron Harberts	October 26, 2007	1ANH03
While investigating a woman found dead in an alleyway, Jill bonds with the victim's teenage daughter. Meanwhile, Lindsay is encouraged by her friends to return to the dating scene and Claire attempts to bring the romance back into her marriage.
4	"Grannies, Guns, and Love Mints"	Rick Wallace	R. Scott Gemmill	November 2, 2007	1ANH04
The Club investigates an underground drug ring that's being run out of a nursing home. Lindsay feels pressured into going on a date. Jill makes a huge decision in her relationship with Luke.
5	"Maybe, Baby"	Skipp Sudduth	Matt Witten	November 9, 2007	1ANH05
The Club investigates the murder of a young man and the disappearance of his pregnant wife. Spurred on by the case, Jill expresses her desire to stay childless. Lindsay and Tom have a one-night stand.
6	"Play Through the Pain"	Tawnia McKiernan	Sherry Carnes	November 16, 2007	1ANH06
The Club investigate the murder of an NFL quarterback whose death was made to look like suicide. Meanwhile, Lindsay runs into Heather the day after her night with Tom, and the two men in Jill's life finally meet.
7	"The Past Comes Back to Haunt You"	Brian Spicer	Melinda Hsu	November 23, 2007	1ANH07
The Club have 24 hours to stop an innocent man's execution and find the real killer of the woman he was accused of murdering. Meanwhile, Jill discovers corruption in the DA's office, and Lindsay worries that her one-night stand with Tom may have resulted in pregnancy.
8	"No Opportunity Necessary"	Rick Wallace	Nichelle D. Tramble	November 30, 2007	1ANH08
The Club investigate the murder of an illegal immigrant, where the only witnesses are the victim's father (who was also shot), and his young daughter. Meanwhile, Lindsay calls in Heather to get through to the girl, and Jill turns to Denise for help when an immigration official turns up.
9	"To Drag & To Hold"	Mel Damski	Gretchen J. Berg and Aaron Harberts	December 7, 2007	1ANH09
The Club delve into San Francisco's drag queen community while investigating a murder. Meanwhile, Tom and Heather tie the knot, and Luke finally discovers the truth about Jill and Hanson's affair.
10	"FBI Guy"	Michael Schultz	Elizabeth Craft and Sarah Fain	January 4, 2008	1ANH10
The Club investigate the decapitation of a wine broker, and suspicion falls on his business partner. Agent Ashe tries to get Lindsay to investigate the Kiss Me Not Killer with him, and Lindsay is forced to come clean over the threat on her life. Tom and Heather return from their honeymoon.
11	"Father's Day"	Félix Enríquez Alcalá	Story by : Robert Nathan and Tom Postiglione; Teleplay by : Sonny Postiglione and Tom Szentgyörgyi	April 29, 2008	1ANH11
Lindsay bends the rules while investigating the murder of an undercover cop, and gets a rude awakening when her dirty ex-cop father suddenly reappears in her life. Meanwhile, Cindy still feels distant from the rest of The Club and Lindsay meets a handsome stranger.
12	"And the Truth Will (Sometimes) Set You Free"	Matthew Penn	Story by : Melinda Hsu and Robert Nathan; Teleplay by : Melinda Hsu and Sherry Carnes	May 6, 2008	1ANH12
An investigation into a rape and murder at a college frat party goes awry for the Club when Cindy is left fighting for her life. Meanwhile, Lindsay considers taking her relationship with Pete to a new level.
13	"Never Tell"	Brad Turner	Story by : Robert Nathan and Matt Witten; Teleplay by : Matt Witten and Nichelle D. Tramble	May 13, 2008	1ANH13
Lindsay risks her life and her new romance to capture the Kiss Me Not Killer once and for all, when a woman's kidnapping leads to the killer's identity being revealed to The Club.

== Reception ==
After reviewing the pilot and skipping the second advance episode, Tim Goodman, San Francisco Chronicle TV critic, published a highly critical review assigning the paper's lowest possible rating.

New York Times TV critic Alessandra Stanley described many nuanced aspects of the show and concluded with, "Women's Murder Club is all right, but not good enough."

Robert Bianco, USA Today critic, wrote a positive review titled "'Murder Club': A simple pleasure worth living for" and ending with, "Still, the actors are enjoyable, and their series in large part does what it sets out to do. It isn't nearly as good as Friday Night Lights, of course - few shows are. But unlike so many fall clunkers, it's competent. This season, that's a rather select club."

Mary McNamara, Los Angeles Times critic, wrote a positive review titled "'Murder Club' is worth joining".

=== U.S. Nielsen ratings ===
Season 1: #57, 8.964m

==== Weekly ratings ====
#	Episode	Air date	Rating	Share	18-49 (Rating/Share)	Viewers (m)	Rank (night)	Rank (timeslot)	Rank (overall)
1	"Welcome to the Club"	October 12, 2007	7.3	13	2.5/8	10.82	#1	#1	#26
2	"Train In Vain"	October 19, 2007	6.5	12	2.0/6	9.69	#2	#1	#37
3	"Blind Dates and Bleeding Hearts"	October 26, 2007	6.1	11	1.9/6	8.90	#1	#1	#41
4	"Grannies, Guns, Love Mints"	November 2, 2007	6.4	11	1.9/6	9.47	#1	#1	#35
5	"Maybe, Baby"	November 9, 2007	6.5	11	2.0/6	9.70	#1	#1	#36
6	"Play Through the Pain"	November 15, 2007	6.1	10	3.3/9	8.93	#8	#3	#45
7	"The Past Comes Back to Haunt You"	November 16, 2007	6.2	11	1.7/5	8.94	#4	#1	#41
8	"No Opportunity Necessary"	November 23, 2007	5.3	9	1.6/5	7.76	#3	#1	#45
9	"To Drag & To Hold"	December 7, 2007	5.8	10	1.8/5	8.58	#2	#1	#32
10	"FBI Guy"	January 4, 2008	5.2	9	1.8/5	7.68	#2	#1	#36
11	"Father's Day"	April 29, 2008	5.8	9	1.9/5	8.14	#7	#2	#42
12	"And the Truth Will (Sometimes) Set You Free"	May 6, 2008	6.1	10	2.2/6	8.68	#8	#2	
13	"Never Tell"	May 13, 2008	5.8	10	2.1/6	8.46		#2	

== International broadcasting ==
The series airs on and E! in Canada, Network Ten in Australia and TV3 in New Zealand. Reruns of the show currently air on Mystery TV in Canada.

In Portugal, the series also airs on Fox Life (first-run) and TVI, but the latter airs the series at prohibitive time slots (around 1 a.m.), causing major criticism. The series is also airs on America Plus which is a part of Orbit Network.

In Hungary, the show aired on June 30, 2008, on RTL Klub.

As of September 5, 2008, WMC also started airing on the Belgian TV channel vtm. The channel officially announced that the show would "strengthen" their Friday Night programming on August 31.

In Latin America, the series is airing on the Fox channel.

In The Netherlands, the show airs on Net 5.

In the Philippines, the series is airing on C/S 9.

The Spanish Fox network also started airing in the beginning of September 2008 under the Spanish name "El Club Contra el Crimen".

The show also airs in South Africa on MNET Series. It premiered on September 11, 2008.

In Russia, the show aired on December 17, 2008, on TV-3.

It has also been aired internationally to the U.S. Military on the American Forces Network (AFN) in 2008.

In Slovakia, the show began airing on January 7, 2009, on TV JOJ.

In France, the first four episodes were aired on March 7, 2009, on M6.

In Singapore, the show aired on November 11, 2009, on MediaCorp Channel 5.

In Italy, the show is airing on La5, but before on Canale 5 in July 2010.

In Germany, the show airs on VOX.

== Novels ==
The following James Patterson Women's Murder Club novels have been released:

- 1st to Die
- 2nd Chance
- 3rd Degree
- 4th of July
- 5th Horseman
- 6th Target
- 7th Heaven
- 8th Confession
- 9th Judgement
- 10th Anniversary
- 11th Hour
- 12th of Never
- Unlucky 13
- 14th Deadly Sin
- 15th Affair
- 16th Seduction
- 17th Suspect
- 18th Abduction
- 19th Christmas
- 20th Victim
- 21st Birthday
- 22 Seconds

• 23rd Midnight • 24th Hour

== Video games ==
The show generated a series of spin-off games on the PC, Mac and Nintendo DS. For the PC and Mac, four hidden objects games were released: Death in Scarlet (2008), Darker Shade of Grey (2009), Twice in a Blue Moon (2009) and Little Black Lies (2010). Women's Murder Club: Games of Passion was released in 2009.
