= 12th of Never =

12th of Never may refer to:

- 12th of Never (novel), a 2013 novel by James Patterson
- "The Twelfth of Never", a song by Johnny Mathis
- Twelfth of Never, an idiom of improbability
