= Video Voyeur =

- Also known as: Video Voyeur: The Susan Wilson Story
- Genre: Drama
- Written by: Kathleen Rowell
- Directed by: Tim Hunter
- Starring: Angie Harmon; Jamey Sheridan; Dale Midkiff; Tegan Moss; Chelan Simmons; Teryl Rothery
- Music by: Daniel Licht
- Original language: English

Production
- Executive producer: Blue André
- Cinematography: Peter Woeste
- Editor: Sunny Hodge
- Running time: 91 minutes
- Production companies: Blue André Productions; Hearst Entertainment Productions; Wilson Story Productions Inc.

Original release
- Network: Lifetime
- Release: January 21, 2002

Video Voyeur or Video Voyeur: The Susan Wilson Story is a 2002 American television drama directed by Tim Hunter and starring Angie Harmon. Made by Lifetime Television, it is based on the real-life story of Susan Wilson, a Louisiana woman, who was videotaped in her own home by a neighbor. Her case helped make video voyeurism a crime in nine U.S. states. Originally, she had no legal recourse as video voyeurism was not considered by those who wrote previous voyeurism legislation.

== Cast ==
- Angie Harmon as Susan Wilson
- Jamey Sheridan as Steve Glover
- Dale Midkiff as Gary Wilson
