= Robert Rotstein =

American attorney and novelist (born 1951)

- Born: Robert Henry Rotstein; June 28, 1951 (age 75); Glendale, California, U.S.
- Education: University of California, Los Angeles (BA, JD)
- Occupations: Lawyer, writer

Robert Henry Rotstein (born June 28, 1951) is an American attorney and novelist currently based in Los Angeles, California. He has published four novels so far, including Corrupt Practices, Reckless Disregard, The Bomb Maker's Son and We, The Jury (2018). He is also currently a partner at the law firm of Mitchell Silberberg & Knupp LLP, focusing on entertainment law, intellectual property law and commercial litigation.

== Background ==
Rotstein was born in Glendale, California, but grew up in Culver City, California, and received his Bachelor of Arts degree from the University of California Los Angeles (UCLA) in 1973, summa cum laude. He also received his Juris Doctor (J.D.) degree from UCLA School of Law in 1976, graduating Order of the Coif and serving as an editor on the UCLA Law Review.

== Legal career ==
Upon graduation from law school, Rotstein served as a judicial law clerk to now U.S. Supreme Court Justice Anthony Kennedy, then Circuit Judge of the U.S. Court of Appeals for the Ninth Circuit. Rotstein then entered private practice at a firm in Beverly Hills, specializing in entertainment law and copyright law. Over the course of his over 38 year legal career in private practice, Rotstein represented various major motion picture studios and clients such as Michael Jackson, Quincy Jones, Lionel Richie, John Sayles, Kenny "Babyface" Edmonds, and James Cameron (e.g. obtaining a Summary judgment for Cameron and his company in a lawsuit involving Cameron's blockbuster motion picture Avatar).

Rotstein also authored a law review article in the Chicago Kent Law Review entitled "Beyond Mataphor: Copyright Infringement and the Fiction of the Work," 68 Chi.-Kent. L. Rev. 725 (1992) that explores the relationship between literary theory and copyright law, and has also taught as an adjunct professor at Loyola Law School in Los Angeles, California, teaching Copyright Law.

Rotstein is currently a partner at Mitchell Silberberg & Knupp LLP, where he co-chairs the firm’s intellectual property department.

== Books ==
Rotstein has published a series of three novels all revolving around the trial attorney protagonist of Parker Stern. In October 2018 his first stand-alone novel, We, the Jury, was released.

The first novel in the series, Corrupt Practices (2013), introduces Parker Stern as an attorney hired by an affluent former client named Rich Baxter to defend him in a lawsuit filed by a powerful Los Angeles church alleging that Baxter has embezzled millions from them. Stern reluctantly takes the case because he has not set foot in a courtroom since his mentor, Harmon Cherry, committed suicide. Yet he gets drawn into the case once realizing that Cherry did not kill himself but was murdered by someone connected to the church. The book received a starred review from Booklist and other positive reviews from New York Journal of Books and Publishers Weekly.

The next novel in the series, Reckless Disregard (2014), follows Stern taking on a case for an elusive video game designer simply known as "Poniard." In Poniard's popular online game "Abduction," a movie mogul is charged with murdering and kidnapping a beautiful movie actress who disappeared in the 1980s; the mogul proceeds to sue Poniard for libel. However, when potential witnesses start dying, and survivors become too frightened to talk, Stern begins to feel like trapped in a game - or something larger - himself. The novel received a starred review from Kirkus Reviews.

The most recent installment in the Parker Stern series is The Bomb Maker's Son (2015) involves Stern representing, at the urging of his mother, a man named Ian Holzner - otherwise known as "The Playa Delta Bomber" that planted a bomb in 1975 that allegedly killed four people. When another "Holzner bomb" explodes and other violent terrorist acts begin to escalate with increasing frequency, Stern slowly begins to undercover the truth behind Holzner and realities involving his family and his own past. The book received positive reviews from Lee Child, Booklist, Kirkus Reviews and Publishers Weekly.

Rotstein is also a member of the Mystery Writers of America and the International Thriller Writers.

== Bibliography ==
- Parker Stern Novels
  - Corrupt Practices (2013)
  - Reckless Disregard (2014)
  - The Bomb Maker's Son (2015)
- We, the Jury (2018)
- Law Review Articles
  - "Beyond Mataphor: Copyright Infringement and the Fiction of the Work," 68 Chi.-Kent. L. Rev. 725 (1992)
