= First to Die =

2003 television film directed by Russell Mulcahy

- DVD cover
- Genre: Mystery
- Based on: 1st to Die by James Patterson
- Teleplay by: Michael O'Hara
- Directed by: Russell Mulcahy
- Starring: Tracy Pollan; Gil Bellows; Carly Pope; Megan Gallagher; Angie Everhart; Mitch Pileggi; Sean Young; Robert Patrick; Pam Grier
- Music by: Patrick Williams
- Country of origin: United States
- Original language: English

Production
- Executive producers: Steve White; Michael O'Hara
- Producer: Tracey Jeffrey
- Cinematography: Attila Szalay
- Editor: Robert Florio
- Running time: 180 minutes
- Production company: Michael O'Hara Productions

Original release
- Network: NBC
- Release: February 23, 2003

First to Die is a 2003 American mystery television film directed by Russell Mulcahy, based on the 2001 novel by James Patterson. The film stars Tracy Pollan, Pam Grier, Angie Everhart and Carly Pope as a group of women team up to investigate a string of murders.

== Plot ==
Homicide inspector Lindsay Boxer teams up with three other professional women to investigate a serial killer who targets brides on their honeymoon. While trying to solve the biggest case of her career, she finds herself falling for her partner and battling a life-threatening illness.

== Cast ==
- Tracy Pollan as Detective Lindsay Boxer
- Gil Bellows as Chris Raleigh
- Carly Pope as Cindy Thomas
- Megan Gallagher as Jill Barnett
- Angie Everhart as Chessy Jenks
- Mitch Pileggi as Warren Jacobi
- Sean Young as Joanna Wade
- Jerry Wasserman as Lt. Roth
- Pam Grier as Claire Washburn
- Byron Mann as Derek Lee
- Robert Patrick as Nicholas Jenks
- Kristina Copeland as Merrill Cale
- John Reardon as David Brandt
- Sonya Salomaa as Melanie Brandt
- L. Harvey Gold as Gerald Brandt
- Clint Carlton as Phillip Campbell
- Chiara Zanni as Heather Tibbs
- Warren Christie as Michael DeGraaff
- Marnie Alton as Kathy Kogut
- Ben Cotton as James Voskul
- Veena Sood as Dr. Veena Yandro
