= The Games: A Private Novel =

2016 novel by James Patterson and Mark Sullivan

- First edition (UK)
- Author: James Patterson and Mark Sullivan
- Language: English
- Genre: Adventure novel
- Publisher: Century (UK); Little, Brown (US)
- Publication date: June 16, 2016 (UK); June 27, 2016 (US)
- Publication place: United States
- Media type: Print (hardcover)
- Pages: 400 pp (first edition, hardcover)
- ISBN: 0316407119
- Preceded by: Private Sydney (2015)
- Followed by: Princess: A Private Novel (2018)

The Games: A Private Novel (also known as Private Rio) is the twelfth novel in the Private series.

== Plot ==
This novel takes place in Rio de Janeiro during the 2014 World Cup and during the 2016 Olympic Games. Private, the private security firm of Jack Morgan, has been hired during both events to help with security. Just prior to the World Cup, a deadly virus named Hydra has killed two children and it kills an official during the World Cup. Just before the Olympics Private is guarding two girls volunteering their time in a service project in a poor section of Rio de Janeiro when their bodyguards are murdered and they are taken hostage. They are rescued, but during the rescue their father is taken hostage. Morgan and the director of Private's Rio office, Jack's girlfriend, plan a rescue of the father.

Meanwhile, a doctor who wants revenge on the wealthy of the world who are to attend the opening ceremony of the Olympics is plotting to release a new and more deadly version of Hydra. He wants to infect and kill as many attendees of the ceremony as possible. Private and the Brazilian police must work quickly to find the doctor and stop the deadly plot.

== Reviews ==
A review in Book Reporter was positive. The review said, "If you can’t make it to Rio for the Olympics, reading THE GAMES will function as an engrossing and riveting prelude that will cause you to appreciate what goes on behind the scenes."
