= Texas Ranger (Patterson novel) =

2018 novel by James Patterson and Andrew Bourelle

- First edition
- Author: James Patterson and Andrew Bourelle
- Language: English
- Genre: Adventure novel
- Publisher: Little, Brown and Company
- Publication date: Aug. 13, 2018
- Publication place: United States
- Media type: Print (hardcover)
- Pages: 368 pp (first edition, hardcover)
- ISBN: 0316556661

Texas Ranger is a stand-alone novel.

== Plot ==
This novel's main character is Texas Ranger Rory Yates. Anne, the ex-wife of Yates, has been receiving death threats. She asks Yates to return to her home, because she is scared. Before Yates can return someone murders Anne in a brutal fashion. Yates is asked to stay away from the case, but he unofficially searches for the killer. Before Yates can find the murderer, this killer strikes again.

== Reviews ==
Ed Godfrey, in a review in The Oklahoman, liked Texas Ranger, saying, "If you like your murder mysteries with an Old West feel, Texas Ranger is worth your time." Chris Gray, in a review in The Houston Chronicle, only somewhat liked this novel. In a story in The Dallas Morning News, author James Patterson talked about this book and why he wrote it. Patterson said, "I haven't written about the area too much, but I enjoyed doing this because it was different. I like to challenge myself and get into a territory where I haven't spent much time as a storyteller." In October 2018 Variety reported that CBS was basing a drama series on Patterson's novel.
