= Second Honeymoon (novel) =

2013 novel by James Patterson and Howard Roughan

- First edition
- Author: James Patterson and Howard Roughan
- Language: English
- Genre: Thriller novel
- Publisher: Little, Brown and Co.
- Publication date: June 24, 2013
- Publication place: United States
- Media type: Print (hardcover)
- Pages: 432 pp (first edition, hardcover)
- ISBN: 0316211222
- Preceded by: Honeymoon

Second Honeymoon is a novel written on the same pattern as Honeymoon, written by James Patterson and Howard Roughan in 2005. Therefore, it is considered the second novel of a series.

== Plot ==
This book has two plots. The primary plot concerns a serial killer who targets newlyweds on their honeymoons. FBI agent John O'Hara (who was central to the first book of this series) works this case, trying to determine who the killer is and why the killer targets particular newlyweds, but in a seemingly random manner. The second plot involves O'Hara personally, but he does not know this until another FBI agent, Sarah Brubaker, brings the matter to his attention.

== Reviews ==
The Book Reporter website has a very positive review of Second Honeymoon. Joe Hartlaub wrote in this review, "Patterson and Roughan make for a great collaborative team. SECOND HONEYMOON picks the reader up and keeps things flowing right along." Today liked the book as well, "James Patterson retains his knack for palpable, chilling suspense in his latest novel, 'Second Honeymoon.'"

USA Today had Second Honeymoon on its list of best-selling books for 23 weeks, beginning with its July 4, 2013, edition. At one time the book held the number one position on this list.
