= Angie Harmon =

American actress (born 1972)

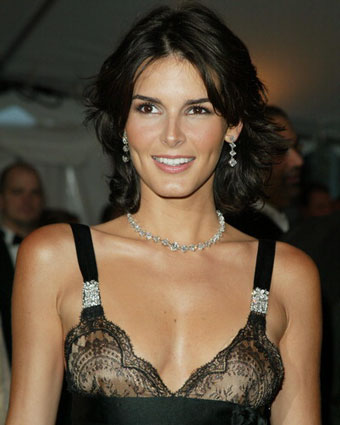
- Harmon in 2007
- Born: Angela Michelle Harmon; August 10, 1972 (age 54); Dallas, Texas, U.S.
- Occupation: Actress
- Years active: 1987–present
- Height: 5' 9" (1.76 m)
- Spouse: Jason Sehorn (m. 2001; div. 2014)
- Partner: Greg Vaughan (2019–2021)
- Children: 3

Angela Michelle Harmon (born August 10, 1972) is an American actress. After winning Seventeen's modeling contest in 1987 at age 15, Harmon signed with IMG Models and appeared on covers for magazines including Cosmopolitan and Esquire. Her first starring role was in the mystery drama series Baywatch Nights (1995–1997). She became known for portraying Abbie Carmichael on the crime drama series Law & Order (1998–2001) and Jane Rizzoli on the TNT series Rizzoli & Isles (2010–2016), winning at the Gracie and People's Choice Awards for the latter.

Harmon's film appearances include Batman Beyond: Return of the Joker (2000) as Barbara Gordon, Agent Cody Banks (2003), and Seraphim Falls (2006). She also played Lindsay Boxer in the short-lived series Women's Murder Club (2007–2008) and starred in a number of Lifetime network's original projects, which include the biographical special Video Voyeur (2002) and the critically acclaimed feature Living Proof (2008). In 2021, she signed an exclusive multi-picture deal with Lifetime.

== Early life ==
Harmon was born in the Dallas suburb of Highland Park, Texas, the daughter of models, Daphne Demar (née Caravageli) and Lawrence Paul Harmon, a hospital information network executive in Dallas, Texas. Her father has English, Scottish, Welsh, Dutch, German and Irish ancestry, while her mother is of Greek descent. In an episode of Who Do You Think You Are?, Harmon found she had a German ancestor who served in George Washington's army during the American Revolutionary War and later acquired land in Mercer County, Kentucky. The land is still owned by a distant branch of her family.

== Career ==
Harmon worked as a child model, and in 1987 won a Seventeen modeling contest. She attended Highland Park High School until 1990, where she was a member of the Highland Belles. She won a Spectrum Model Search contest shortly afterward, subsequently pursued a successful modeling career, and became well known in the early 1990s. She worked as a runway model for Calvin Klein, Giorgio Armani, and Donna Karan and appeared on the covers of ELLE, Cosmopolitan, and Esquire. She is signed with IMG Models in New York City.

Harmon began acting in 1995 after being discovered on a plane by David Hasselhoff. She then had a leading role in Baywatch Nights and the short-lived C-16: FBI. She also appeared in the 1997 film Lawn Dogs, which received a limited theatrical release.

In the late 1990s, Harmon became better known when she joined the NBC series Law & Order, playing Assistant District Attorney Abbie Carmichael from 1998 to 2001. During this time, she also voiced Barbara Gordon in the animated film Batman Beyond: Return of the Joker, succeeding Stockard Channing in the role. Harmon left Law & Order to concentrate on her film career, saying that she preferred working in film to television.

After appearing in the 2001 direct-to-video film Good Advice, she had a supporting role in Agent Cody Banks (2003), playing the CIA handler of a teenage agent (Frankie Muniz). In 2006, Harmon co-starred with Cuba Gooding Jr. and James Woods in the direct-to-DVD political suspense drama End Game, and appeared as Rose in the acclaimed Western film Seraphim Falls.

In 2006, Harmon starred in an ABC pilot Secrets of a Small Town, which did not go to series. She also starred in another failed television show on NBC, Inconceivable, which was canceled after two episodes. The following year, she starred in another ABC pilot, Women's Murder Club, which aired for thirteen episodes. Harmon was one of five actresses who posed discreetly nude for the May 2008 issue of Allure magazine, alongside Gabrielle Union, Zoe McLellan, Jill Scott, and Ana Ortiz.

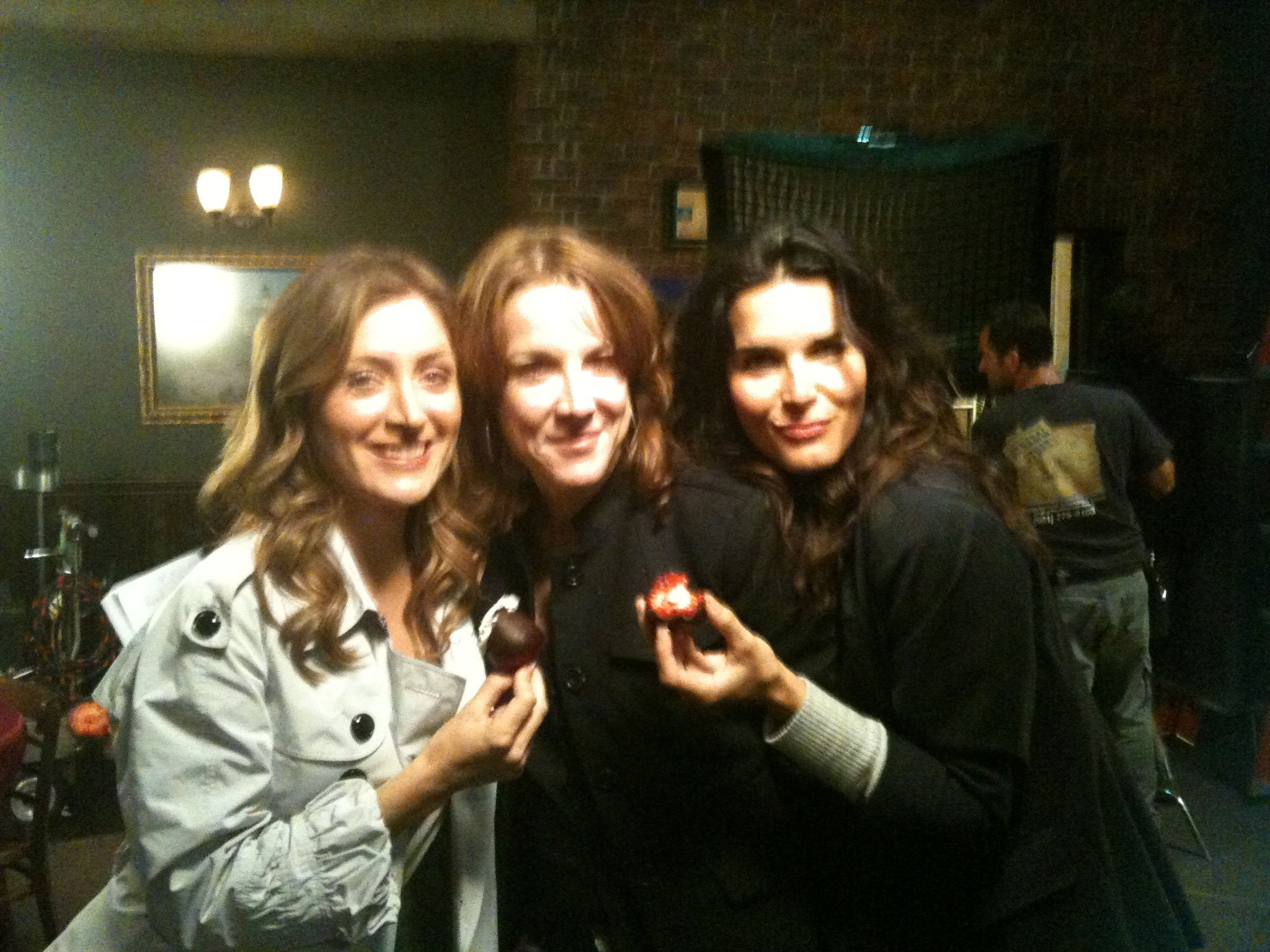
Harmon, to the right, on set of Rizzoli & Isles

In 2010, Harmon hosted an infomercial for "UpLiv", a stress-management program, and also appeared in an infomercial for Olay "Pro-X" wrinkle cream. From 2010 to 2016, she co-starred with Sasha Alexander in the TNT crime-drama series Rizzoli & Isles, playing Boston police detective Jane Rizzoli. The show premiered July 12, 2010. She directed the series' 100th episode. Harmon won Outstanding Female Actor in a Leading Role in a Drama Series for Rizzoli & Isles at the 2012 Gracie Allen Awards, and also won a People's Choice Award for Favorite Cable TV Actress in 2015.

Harmon appeared in the music video for Craig Morgan's "This Ole Boy", released in January 2012. In July 2012, during promotions for a new season of Rizzoli and Isles, Harmon revealed on Conan O'Brien's late night series that she was a fan of and very interested in playing a film version of She-Hulk should such a film become available.

In June 2021, Harmon signed a multi-picture development deal with Lifetime. She hosted the documentary series Cellmate Secrets and starred as Hazel King in Buried in Barstow.

== Personal life ==
On March 13, 2000, Harmon became engaged to former NFL player Jason Sehorn. She was appearing as a guest on The Tonight Show with Jay Leno when Leno called Sehorn out as a surprise guest, who proposed to her. They were married on June 9, 2001. They have three daughters: In November 2014, Harmon and Sehorn separated after 13 years of marriage.

From 2019 until 2021, Harmon was engaged to actor Greg Vaughan.

Harmon defines herself as a "liberal Republican" who supports feminism and gay rights. She and Sehorn spoke at the 2004 Republican National Convention in support of President George W. Bush.

She is a Taekwondo practitioner and also trains in boxing.

She is not related to Mark Harmon despite sharing surnames.

== Filmography ==
=== Film ===
Year	Title	Role	Notes
1997	Lawn Dogs	Pamela 'Pam' Gregory	
2000	Batman Beyond: Return of the Joker	Commissioner Barbara Gordon	Voice
2000	The Acting Class	Herself	
2001	Good Advice	Page Henson	
2003	Agent Cody Banks	Ronica Miles	
2005	Fun with Dick and Jane	Veronica Cleeman	
2006	End Game	Kate Crawford	
2006	Glass House: The Good Mother	Eve Goode	Direct-to-video
2006	Seraphim Falls	Rose	
2009	Hope and Miracles: the Making of Living Proof	Herself	Video Documentary Short
2016	TNT Original Series: Frozen Moments	–	"Buried in Barstow"

=== Television ===
Year	Title	Role	Notes
1989	The More You Know	Herself	
1995	Renegade	Debbie Prentice	Episode: "Offshore Thunder"
1995–1997	Baywatch Nights	Ryan McBride	Main cast, 44 episodes
1996	Baywatch	Ryan McBride	Episode: "Sail Away"
1997–1998	C-16: FBI	Amanda Reardon	Main cast, 13 episodes
1998–2001	Law & Order	A.D.A. Abbie Carmichael	Main cast (seasons 9–11); 72 episodes
1999–2000	Law & Order: Special Victims Unit	A.D.A. Abbie Carmichael	6 episodes
2000	Batman Beyond	Commissioner Barbara Gordon	Voice, 3 episodes
2002	Video Voyeur: The Susan Wilson Story	Susan Wilson	Television film
2005	Inconceivable	Dr. Nora Campbell	Main cast, 10 episodes
2006	Secrets of a Small Town	Bethany Steele	Episode: "Pilot"
2006	Kathy Griffin: My Life on the D-List	Herself	Episode: "Red State, Blue State"
2007–2008	Women's Murder Club	Inspector Lindsay Boxer	Main cast, 13 episodes
2008	Living Proof	Lilly Tartikoff	Television film
2009	Samantha Who?	Gigi	Episode: "The Other Woman"
2010	Chuck	Sydney Prince	Episode: "Chuck Versus Operation Awesome"
2010–2016	Rizzoli & Isles	Jane Rizzoli	105 episodes Lead role Won—Gracie Allen Award for Outstanding Female Actor in a Drama Series; People's Choice Award for Favorite Cable Television Actress
2015	Who Do You Think You Are?	Herself	Episode: "Angie Harmon"
2017–2018	Voltron: Legendary Defender	Lady Trigel	Voice, 3 episodes
2021	Cellmate Secrets	Herself	Narrator
2022	Buried in Barstow	Hazel King	Television film
2023	Beat Bobby Flay	Herself	Episode: "Kitchen Crime Scene"

== Awards and nominations ==
Year	Award	Category	Work	Result
1999	Screen Actors Guild Awards	Outstanding Performance by an Ensemble in a Drama Series (shared with Benjamin Bratt, Steven Hill, Carey Lowell, S. Epatha Merkerson, Jerry Orbach, and Sam Waterston)	Law & Order	Nominated
2000	Screen Actors Guild Awards	Outstanding Performance by an Ensemble in a Drama Series (shared with Benjamin Bratt, Steven Hill, Jesse L. Martin, Carey Lowell, S. Epatha Merkerson, Jerry Orbach, and Sam Waterston)	Law & Order	Nominated
2001	Screen Actors Guild Awards	Outstanding Performance by an Ensemble in a Drama Series (shared with Steven Hill, Jesse L. Martin, S. Epatha Merkerson, Jerry Orbach, Sam Waterston, and Dianne Wiest)	Law & Order	Nominated
2002	Screen Actors Guild Awards	Outstanding Performance by an Ensemble in a Drama Series (shared with Jesse L. Martin, S. Epatha Merkerson, Jerry Orbach, Elisabeth Röhm, Sam Waterston, and Dianne Wiest)	Law & Order	Nominated
2010	Women's Image Network Awards	Actress Drama Series	Rizzoli & Isles	Nominated
2012	Gracie Awards	Outstanding Female Actor in a Leading Role in a Drama Series or Special	Rizzoli & Isles	Won
2014	People's Choice Awards	Favorite Cable TV Actress	Rizzoli & Isles	Nominated
2014	TV Guide Award	Favorite Duo (shared with Sasha Alexander)	Rizzoli & Isles	Nominated
2015	People's Choice Awards	Favorite Cable TV Actress	Rizzoli & Isles	Won
