= NYPD Red 3 =

2015 novel by James Patterson

- First edition
- Author: James Patterson and Marshall Karp
- Language: English
- Genre: Adventure novel
- Publisher: Little, Brown and Company
- Publication date: March 16, 2015
- Publication place: United States
- Media type: Print (hardcover)
- Pages: 384 pp (first edition, hardcover)
- ISBN: 0316406996
- Preceded by: NYPD Red 2
- Followed by: NYPD Red 4

NYPD Red 3 is the third novel in the James Patterson NYPD Red series.

== Plot ==
This third novel in the NYPD Red series centers on two of the NYPD Red detectives, Zach Jordan and his partner Kylie MacDonald. NYPD Red, an entity invented by Patterson for his series, is an elite and well trained unit that has the job of protecting the rich, the famous and the well connected. This duo get called into a case in which the headless body of a man named Peter who was the chauffeur of one of New York's most powerful men, Hunter Alden, is found in the garage. Alden's son also goes missing and a witness swears he and his friend were kidnapped. Alden denies his son is missing and is reluctant to help the police. Zach and Kylie, who are both trying to sort out their own problems with domestic partners, must put their issues on hold to determine what is happening concerning the murder and alleged kidnapping cases assigned to them. The plot of this novel is full of very unexpected twists and turns.

== Reviews ==
NYPD Red 3 was on the USA Today Best-Selling Books list for twelve weeks and at one point was number two on the list.

The Literary Guild did not review this book, but made a positive comment, saying it was "suspenseful, thrilling, and a classic Patterson page-turner." Book Reporter liked this book, saying, "Patterson and Karp have a winning formula here that does not read like formula writing at all and hopefully will continue for some time to come." A unique site that reviews books, Ramblings of a Coffee Addicted Writer, wrote a positive review of this novel, saying, "Overall, NYPD Red 3 is a fast-paced, intense thrill-ride from start to finish."
