= Richard DiLallo =

American writer

Richard DiLallo is the co-author (along with James Patterson) of the #1 New York Times bestseller Alex Cross's Trial.

He has had articles published in Glamour, Brides, and America.

He is former executive vice president and executive creative director of DDB Worldwide (Chicago).
