= Princess: A Private Novel =

2018 novel by James Patterson and Rees Jones

- First edition, cover showing Big Ben
- Author: James Patterson & Rees Jones
- Language: English
- Series: Private series
- Genre: Thriller novel
- Publisher: Grand Central Publishing
- Publication date: May 15, 2018
- Publication place: United States
- Media type: Print (hardcover)
- Pages: 384 pp (first edition, hardcover)
- ISBN: 978-1-53871-444-7 (for first hardcover edition)
- Preceded by: The Games: A Private Novel (2016)

Princess: A Private Novel, written by James Patterson and Rees Jones, is the thirteenth book of the Private Series. Private is a private investigative agency started by Jack Morgan's father and subsequently built into a worldwide enterprise by Jack Morgan.

== Plot ==
This book is a thriller novel set in England and Wales. The main characters are Morgan and Peter Knight, the director of Private London, a subsidiary of Private. Private and Private London have been commissioned by Princess Caroline, third in line to the British throne, to locate Sophie Edwards. Sophie, a close friend of the Princess, has disappeared. While Morgan and his people are working this case, a nemesis from the past surfaces and inflicts a painful blow to Morgan. He is determined to find his old enemy before more people are hurt.
