= NYPD Red 4 =

Novel by James Patterson and Marshall Karp

- First edition
- Author: James Patterson and Marshall Karp
- Language: English
- Genre: Adventure novel
- Publisher: Little, Brown and Company
- Publication date: January 25, 2016
- Publication place: United States
- Media type: Print (hardcover)
- Pages: 368 pp (first edition, hardcover)
- ISBN: 0316407062
- Preceded by: NYPD Red 3
- Followed by: Red Alert

NYPD Red 4 is the fourth novel in the James Patterson NYPD Red series.

== Plot ==
This fourth novel in the NYPD Red series centers on two of the NYPD Red detectives, Zach Jordan and his partner Kylie MacDonald. NYPD Red, an entity invented by Patterson for his series, is an elite and well trained unit that has the job of protecting the rich, the famous and the well connected. This novel has three distinct plots. The main plot involves the robbery of an $8 million necklace that involved a murder of a starlet that was witnessed by a large crowd of people. A second plot involves the theft of expensive diagnostic equipment from a number of the city's hospitals. The subplot is the search for Kylie's husband, who has relapsed after going through several drug abuse rehab programs.

== Reviews ==
This book was at the top of the USA Today best seller list in early February 2016.
