= Woman of God =

Novel by James Patterson and Maxine Paetro

- First edition
- Author: James Patterson & Maxine Paetro
- Language: English
- Genre: Mystery novel
- Publisher: Little, Brown and Company
- Publication date: September 26, 2016
- Publication place: United States
- Media type: Print (hardcover)
- Pages: 400 pp (first edition, hardcover)
- ISBN: 978-0-31627-402-9 (for first hardcover edition)

Woman of God, written by James Patterson and Maxine Paetro, is a stand-alone novel.

== Plot ==
The central character of this book is Brigid Fitzgerald, a physician working with the fictional organization Kind Hands (similar to Doctors without Borders). Brigid is in south Sudan in very desperate and dangerous conditions. Brigid is shot and almost killed and while she is at death's door God talks to her. Throughout this novel God talks to Brigid a number of times. Her life is a tragic one. Things start to go well and Brigid marries and has a child. She suddenly loses her husband and child at once and goes back to Sudan, nearly losing her life again. She finally returns to her native Massachusetts and with a new husband founds a new religious movement.

== Reception ==
Kirkus Reviews reviewed this book and somewhat liked it, saying, "A high-concept pitch, a potboiler on the page, and a protagonist to cheer for, but the authors do not quite tie it all together."

Woman of God was number one in hardcover fiction category in the New York Times Best Sellers list when it first appeared on that list, on October 16, 2016. It was number four in the combined print & e-book fiction category for the same week.
