= The House Next Door (short story collection) =

2019 adventure novel

- First edition
- Author: James Patterson with Susan DiLallo, Max DiLallo and Tim Arnold
- Language: English
- Genre: Adventure novel
- Publisher: Grand Central Publishing
- Publication date: January 8, 2019
- Publication place: United States
- Media type: Print (hardcover)
- Pages: 488 pp (first edition, hardcover)
- ISBN: 978-1538730805

The House Next Door is a stand-alone book containing three fictional stories.

== Plot ==
This book contais three short stories. James Patterson wrote each of the stories with one of the co-authors of the book.

The first story, "The House Next Door" (written by Patterson and Susan DiLallo), is about a family living next to a derelict house that has just been occupied by a mysterious man and his son. As the family and the neighbors get to know the house's new occupants, what they learn is truly frightening.

"The Killer's Wife," written by Patterson and Max DiLallo, is about a detective's quest to find four missing girls. He decides to get on the good side of the wife of the man suspected of abducting them. He knows he is walking a fine line and his plan could go all wrong.

"We.Are.Not.Alone." was written by Patterson and Tim Arnold. It is about a scientist who has been looking for alien life for years and who is no longer taken seriously. He gets a message from space proving that intelligent aliens exist. While that is what he wanted, he finds that others want to seize him and whisk him away, so he runs for his life.

== Reviews ==
The House Next Door did not immediately make The New York Times best sellers list. It did so as a mass market monthly book for the month of December 2019.
