= Women's Murder Club: Games of Passion =

2009 role-playing video game

- Developer: Griptonite Games
- Publisher: THQ
- Series: Women's Murder Club
- Platform: Nintendo DS
- Release: NA: September 22, 2009; AU: November 5, 2009; EU: November 6, 2009
- Genre: Puzzle
- Mode: Single-player

Women's Murder Club: Games of Passion is a 2009 role-playing video game developed for the Nintendo DS. It is an adaptation of the TV series Women's Murder Club.

== Development ==
THQ unveiled Games of Passion at E3 2009.

== Gameplay ==
The player plays as multiple investigators and criminologists, who are sent to work on murder scenes. In these crime scenes, the player is tasked with finding specific objects in the scene in order to be able to identify the murder victim.

After finding all of the required objects, a deduction is made, which is used to develop the storyline and find the perpetrator.

The games takes the style of a text-based game, having two characters talking at a time, with characters swapping between scenes.

== Reception ==
Games of Passion was met with a mixed or average reception, receiving a Metacritic score of 53%. Game People review found that the game focused overly on narration and not enough on gameplay. According to IGN, "Women's Murder Club is notable for two things: Teaching people how to avoid being arrested for murder and its Mad Libs bonus mode. The rest is fairly forgettable, though I suppose fans of James Patterson might want to be part of the unique storyline."
