= 1st to Die =

2001 crime novel by James Patterson

1st To Die
- First edition, Golden Gate Bridge pictured
- Author: James Patterson
- Language: English
- Series: Women's Murder Club
- Genre: Crime novel
- Publisher: Little, Brown and Company
- Publication date: March 2001
- Publication place: United States
- Media type: Print (hardback & paperback)
- Pages: 462 pp
- ISBN: 978-0-316-66600-8
- Followed by: 2nd Chance

1st to Die is a 2001 crime novel by American author James Patterson. It is the first book in the Women's Murder Club series. The series is about four friends who pool their skills together to crack San Francisco's toughest murder cases. Lindsay Boxer is a homicide inspector for the San Francisco Police Department; Claire Washburn is a medical examiner; Jill Bernhardt is an assistant D.A.; and Cindy Thomas is a reporter who just started working the crime desk of the San Francisco Chronicle.

== Plot summary ==
The prologue introduces the main character Inspector Lindsay Boxer, San Francisco P.D., who is in a depression and holding a gun to her head as a result of losing a love interest in a case called "The Honeymoon Murders".

Book One begins with David and Melanie Brandt, freshly married, in their hotel room at the Grand Hyatt. A man outside the door calls "Champagne" and David opens the door. The man, Phillip Campbell, then violently kills the bride and groom and immorally brutalizes the corpse of Melanie.

The book then cuts to Inspector Lindsay Boxer in her general practitioner's office. The doctor, Dr. Roy Orenthaler, tells Lindsay that she has a rare and deadly blood disease called Negli's aplastic anemia. Throughout the book, Lindsay struggles with the physical side effects of getting blood transfusions, and the emotional aspect of having a life-threatening disease. During her appointment, she is called to the crime scene of a double murder at the Grand Hyatt. In that scene she is introduced to Cindy Thomas, covering the story. The second pair of bodies are found, and after Lindsay is told she has a new partner due to the sensitivity of the case, Cindy, Lindsay, and medical examiner Claire Washburn join forces to attempt to solve the case.

The third pair of bodies are found in Cleveland, Ohio, which are thought to be connected to the San Francisco cases. As Lindsay and company go through the case, they acquire a fourth friend, Assistant D.A. Jill Bernhardt. Together, the four attempt to pin down a suspect, leading to the shocking conclusion. A subplot features Lindsay's attraction to Chris Raleigh, her new partner.

== Reception ==
Kirkus Reviews stated the novel has "bargain-basement plotting, fewer thrills than a tax audit, and cardboard sleuths poised to return for a sequel."

== Film adaptation ==
In 2003, the novel was adapted into a television film, First to Die, starring Tracy Pollan, Carly Pope, Megan Gallagher, Pam Grier, Gil Bellows, Robert Patrick and Sean Young.
