= 18th Abduction =

2019 novel by James Patterson

- First US edition
- Author: James Patterson and Maxine Paetro
- Language: English
- Series: Women's Murder Club (novel series)
- Genre: Thriller
- Publisher: Century (UK); Little Brown (US)
- Publication date: April 29, 2019 (Note: This is the release date for the hardcover edition. Other editions were released on other dates.)
- Publication place: United States
- Media type: Print (hardcover) (Note: Also released as Amazon Kindle edition, audiobook and as a paperback.)
- Pages: 416 pp (first edition, hardcover)
- ISBN: 978-0316420266
- Preceded by: 17th Suspect (2018)
- Followed by: 19th Christmas (2019)

18th Abduction is the eighteenth novel in the Women's Murder Club novel series (Note: Women's Murder Club: The Trial is sometimes called fifteen and half in this series, which would make 18th Abduction the eighteenth novel in the series in such a case.) by James Patterson and Maxine Paetro.

== Plot ==
San Francisco Police Sergeant Lindsay Boxer is the main character of this book. It has two plots. The main plot involves three schoolteachers, who suddenly vanish after a night out after school. One turns up murdered with no clues as to who killed her or why or where the other two teachers are. The second plot involves Lindsay's husband, Joe Molinari. A woman who survived a deadly attack on her village in another country many years before comes to Joe with a story that she has seen a war criminal who was involved in this attack in San Francisco. Both Lindsay and Joe look very hard for any clues they can find in both these cases.

== Reviews ==
A positive review came from the Times of India. The review said, "With two intriguing storylines running side by side, the book is hard to put down and will be over faster than the reader anticipated." Book Reporter also liked this book, saying, "Longtime readers of the Women’s Murder Club know what to expect with each installment, and this latest entry more than delivers on all counts."

This book was number one on The New York Times list of best sellers for Combined Print & E-Book Fiction for the week of May 19, 2019.
