= The 5th Horseman =

2006 novel by James Patterson

- First edition cover
- Author: James Patterson and Maxine Paetro
- Language: English
- Series: Women's Murder Club
- Genre: Thriller, mystery novel
- Published: 2006 (Little, Brown)
- Publication place: United States
- Media type: Print (hardcover)
- Pages: 410 pp (first edition, hardback)
- ISBN: 978-0-316-15977-7
- OCLC: 61162187
- Dewey Decimal: 813/.54 22
- LC Class: PS3566.A822 A6154 2006
- Preceded by: 4th of July
- Followed by: The 6th Target

The 5th Horseman is the fifth book in the Women's Murder Club series featuring Lindsay Boxer by James Patterson and Maxine Paetro first published in February 2006. The novel like many in the series was commercially successful and repeatedly appeared in Publishers Weekly bestseller lists, and high in the 2006 list at the end of that year.

== Plot ==
The story begins with a mysterious character named the Night Walker who kills a hospital patient, Jessie Falk. Two plots are intertwined; the first is about a serial killer murdering young girls and posing them into luxury cars; Lindsay Boxer and her team call them "Car Girls".

The second deals with the murders that take place at San Francisco Municipal Hospital. Patients whose diagnoses are not putting their lives in danger die continuously, and buttons are placed on their eyes, once dead.

One of those victims is Keiko Castellano, Yuki's mother. Yuki enlists the aid of her friends to find out the real reason her mother has died.

Lindsay is called to the scene of the murders involving young women who have been murdered and then posed in expensive cars seemingly chosen at random. Each woman has been dressed in very expensive clothing from Nordstrom. The case is puzzling until it is learned that the clothes are the link - one of the killers is an employee at Nordstrom and has stolen the clothes to dress his dead models.

Lindsay captures the killers, who are a Kenneth Guthrie and Louise Bennet (a prostitute called Cherrie), and watches helplessly as Louise jumps out of a window.

Tied into the strange murders at Municipal Hospital is a court case against municipal which involves a malpractice suit filed on behalf of twenty plaintiffs whose family members died at the hospital due to medication errors or perhaps outright murders. The ER doctor, Dennis Garza, working in conjunction with the prosecutor, flubs his testimony so that the hospital loses. The doctor and the prosecutor, Maureen O'Mara, who are lovers, will split the $18 million reward she will receive for the victory.

Their getaway plan is foiled when an outraged father of a dead patient confronts Garza. Garza kills the man and then attempts to get away, only to be stopped by Lindsay.

The Night Walker - the murderer of Keiko and other patients - is uncovered to be a crazy nurse, Marie Saint-Germaine and is caught after her last attempt to murder another patient, who was an undercover agent posing as a patient.

== Release details ==
- 2006, USA, Little Brown ISBN 978-0-316-15977-7, 27 February 2006, hardback (first edition)
