= 17th Suspect =

2018 novel by James Patterson and Maxine Paetro

- First edition
- Author: James Patterson and Maxine Paetro
- Language: English
- Series: Women's Murder Club (novel series)
- Genre: Crime novel
- Publisher: Little, Brown and Company
- Publication date: April 30, 2018 (Note: This is the release date for the hardcover edition. Other editions were released on other dates.)
- Publication place: United States
- Media type: Print (hardcover) (Note: Also released as Amazon Kindle edition, audiobook and as a paperback.)
- Pages: 368 pp (first edition, hardcover)
- ISBN: 978-0316274043
- Preceded by: 16th Seduction (2017)
- Followed by: 18th Abduction (2019)

17th Suspect is the seventeenth novel in the Women's Murder Club novel series (Note: Women's Murder Club: The Trial is sometimes called fifteen and half in this series, which would make 17th Suspect the seventeenth novel in the series in such a case.) by James Patterson and Maxine Paetro.

== Plot ==
San Francisco Police Sergeant Lindsay Boxer is the main character of this book. It has two plots. The main plot involves a number of unsolved murders of homeless people. The second involves a charge of rape by a male employee against his female supervisor in an advertising agency.

In the main plot Lindsay and her partner, Rich Conklin, get involved in the homeless murders when a homeless woman comes to Lindsay to complain that the detectives who should be investigating the cases are doing basically nothing. The murders are occurring in a jurisdiction outside of Lindsay's area of responsibility. She makes waves and files a complaint against one of the detectives who is in charge of the investigations. Then a murder happens on Lindsay's turf. In the meantime the detective against whom Lindsay filed a complaint files one against Lindsay and both officers go before a review board. To make matters worse Lindsay begins feelings weak and fears an old illness that nearly killed her has come back.

The second plot involves another member of the Women's Murder Club, Yuki Castellano, an attorney with the district prosecutor's office. She is prosecuting the rape case. She is finding this case full of twists and turns and she is going head to head against a very accomplished defense attorney. Yuki worries not only about winning such a case, but her husband seems to be going through some sort of problems and Yuki would like to know exactly what they are.

== Reviews ==
A review of this book in Book Reporter is positive. The review concludes, "While THE 17th SUSPECT is complete in itself, it does leave an element of the book dangling treacherously at the conclusion. Longtime readers of the series will recall that Patterson and Paetro are not averse to removing recurring characters from the mix with little warning, so whether they will “go there” is a consideration that is always on the table. We will have to wait until next year to find out, but the anticipation will be worth it." Reviewer Courtney Bauman, for several reasons she mentioned in her review, was not that impressed with this book, saying, "17th Suspect came up a bit short."

This book was the number one New York Times best seller for Combined Print & E-Book Fiction for two weeks in 2018.
