= The 8th Confession =

Book by James Patterson

- First edition
- Author: James Patterson and Maxine Paetro
- Language: English
- Series: Women's Murder Club
- Genre: Crime novel
- Publisher: Little, Brown and Company
- Publication date: April 27, 2009
- Publication place: United States
- ISBN: 978-0-316-01876-0
- Preceded by: 7th Heaven
- Followed by: The 9th Judgment

The 8th Confession is the eighth book in the Women's Murder Club series featuring Lindsay Boxer by James Patterson and Maxine Paetro. This novel was released on April 27, 2009.

== Plot ==
Stacey Glenn, a dropout girl from the high society is convicted of multiple counts of murder by Yuki Castellano - the lawyer of the Murder Club. Glenn is killed and beheaded once she arrives in prison.

The major plot develops around two cases: a homeless man who goes by the name of Bagman Jesus is beaten to death and then targeted with multiple shots; Linsday and her friends investigate the case but they initially find a wall of silence defending him; many people living in the slums where he lived seem to consider him a sort of a saint. Boxer's team finally gives Bagman Jesus an identity; he is Rodney Brooker, a meth dealer who provoked a terrible explosion with a school bus he used as a drug laboratory; he was not loved by the people who knew him but on the contrary he was feared and hated; he had been actually killed by his mates; who also planned to put the blame one on the other in order to make all confessions void and impossible to be used in a courtroom.

Then there's a girl, whom the reader comes to meet as "Pet Girl", who kills rich people without leaving any trace behind; the corpses seem immaculate and intact. She kills multiple couples until Boxer and her partner Rich Conklin manage to trace her while she's trying another murder; her victims were killed with poison from lethal snakes; one of them bites Rich; but he manages to survive and Pet Girl is arrested. In the end, she's revealed to be Norma Johnson, daughter of a man who had taught her how to manage dangerous snakes but wanted to throw her out of his house since she was hated by his lover; Norma had killed him and from then on she had become a serial killer out of revenge.
