= 12th of Never (novel) =

2013 book by James Patterson and Maxine Paetro

- First hardcover edition
- Author: James Patterson and Maxine Paetro
- Language: English
- Genre: Thriller novel
- Publisher: Little, Brown and Co.
- Publication date: April 29, 2013
- Publication place: United States
- Media type: Print (hardcover)
- Pages: 432 pp (first edition, hardcover)
- ISBN: 031621082X (for first hardcover edition)
- Preceded by: 11th Hour
- Followed by: Unlucky 13

12th of Never is the twelfth book of the Women's Murder Club series, written by James Patterson and Maxine Paetro.

== Plot ==
This book has three major plots and at least two minor ones. The first begins with the birth of police detective Lindsay Boxer's daughter, which had to be at home during a major power outage. The less than sterile condition of the baby's birth causes medical complications that keep Boxer away from her job during part of the investigation into a strange series of murders.

The second plot revolves around the series of murders. These murders take place after an eccentric college professor has vivid dreams about murders that end up coming true much in the manner he dreams them.

The third major plot involves a murder case Assistant District Attorney Yuki Castellano is trying in court. Castellano and Boxer are members of an informal group known as the Women's Murder Club. Castellano's court case has many twists.

== Reviews ==
Reviewing the novel at BookReporter.com, Joe Hartlaub wrote, "12th of Never is a book you should read, you'll find it moving and compelling from beginning to end."
