= 2nd Chance (Patterson novel) =

2003 novel by James Patterson

2nd Chance (novel)
- First edition. The Transamerica Pyramid pictured
- Author: James Patterson with Andrew Gross
- Language: English
- Series: Women's Murder Club
- Genre: Crime novel
- Published: 2003 (Little, Brown)
- Publication place: United States
- Media type: Print (hardback & paperback)
- Pages: 432 pp
- ISBN: 0-446-61279-0
- OCLC: 51507481
- Preceded by: 1st to Die
- Followed by: 3rd Degree

2nd Chance is the second novel in the Women's Murder Club series written by James Patterson with Andrew Gross. It is the sequel to 1st to Die.

== Plot summary ==
Homicide Lieutenant Lindsay Boxer is still recovering from the recent loss of her partner and is just returning to the force when she is called in to investigate a series of murders that include an 11-year-old girl and an elderly woman. Through her investigations she discovers a connection to a jail-hate gang called Chimera. After another police officer is killed by a sniper and then her boss is murdered, the trail leads to the ex-cop Frank Coombs. To further complicate all of the Women's Murder Club ladies, Jill is pregnant and Claire becomes a target for the Chimera killer. Cindy starts dating the murdered girl's pastor, Aaron Winslow, and Lindsay's father shows up, pretending he misses his daughter, but actually following Chimera, too, as he was present the day the killer slaughtered a 14-year-old boy. Finally, after chasing the trail of Frank Coombs, Lindsay trails the real killer, Rusty Coombs - Frank's son - to a tower on a college campus where he has opened fire and killed several students. Rusty is getting revenge for what has happened to his father and no longer cares if he lives or dies. Lindsay kills Rusty at the college tower. As an epilogue, Lindsay receives a postcard from her father in Mexico saying sorry for lying to her about his crooked past and telling her he has bought a boat and named it Buttercup, his pet name for her.

== Reception ==
Publishers Weekly said 2nd Chance was Patterson's most interesting book since When the Wind Blows.
