= 19th Christmas =

2019 novel by James Patterson and Maxine Paetro

- First edition (US)
- Author: James Patterson and Maxine Paetro
- Language: English
- Series: Women's Murder Club
- Genre: Thriller
- Publisher: Little, Brown & Company
- Publication date: Oct. 7, 2019
- Publication place: United States
- Media type: Print (hardcover)
- Pages: 368 pp (first edition, hardcover)
- ISBN: 978-0316420273
- Preceded by: 18th Abduction (2019)

19th Christmas is the nineteenth novel in the Women's Murder Club novel series (Note: Women's Murder Club: The Trial is sometimes called fifteen and half in this series, which would make 19th Christmas the nineteenth novel in the series.) by James Patterson and Maxine Paetro.

== Plot ==
Christmas is coming upon San Francisco. Detective Sgt. Lindsay Boxer, her family, and her friends of the Women's Murder Club have much to celebrate. Crime is down. The courts are slow and the medical examiner's office is quiet. Journalist Cindy Thomas is working on a story about the true meaning of Christmas in San Francisco. Then a series of crimes and threats of horrific crimes to come put the entire police force into nonstop action. At first, all they have is a name, "Loman," behind the threats. It takes until Christmas before enough pieces come together to find enough to hope to pinpoint where Loman can be caught.

== Reviews ==
Joe Hartlaub wrote a very positive review of this novel in Book Reporter, referring to the Women's Murder Club Series, saying, "I am tempted to call THE 19th CHRISTMAS the best entry in the series thus far..."

This book was at the number one spot in the "Combined Print & E-Book Fiction" section of The New York Times Best Sellers list for October 27, 2019.
