= 11th Hour (novel) =

2012 crime novel by James Patterson

- First hardcover edition
- Author: James Patterson and Maxine Paetro
- Language: English
- Series: Women's Murder Club
- Genre: Thriller novel
- Publisher: Little, Brown and Co.
- Publication date: May 7, 2012
- Publication place: United States
- Media type: Print (hardcover)
- Pages: 416 pp (first edition, hardcover)
- ISBN: 0316097497 (for first hardcover edition)
- Preceded by: 10th Anniversary (2011)
- Followed by: 12th of Never (2013)

11th Hour is the 11th novel of the Women’s Murder Club series written by American authors James Patterson and Maxine Paetro. The main character of this series is Sgt. Lindsay Boxer. The Women's Murder Club is a small group of women who meet with Boxer to help solve sensational crimes in San Francisco. Throughout the series, the membership of the Women's Murder Club has had some changes.

== Plot ==
This book has two major plots involving cases in which Boxer quickly becomes involved. Someone is gunning down San Francisco drug dealers and kills an undercover officer. One of the weapons used was taken from her own department's evidence locker, indicating the involvement of a rogue cop.

The second major plot involves Boxer, when two heads appear unexpectedly in the garden of a mansion owned by a world-famous actor. More heads are unearthed in the garden.

The first plot concerns Noelle Smith, a violinist, who is giving a gig in front of her father, Chaz Smith, who's killed in the bathroom by a lone avenger, Revenge.

He used a cop, so the circle closes down. But Chaz Smith is revealed to be a cop, too, and Revenge is finally captured by Lindsay Boxer and Rich Conklin; his real name is William Randall, and he decided to take revenge on pushers in the name of his son, who was killed by drugs, without anyone paying for his premature death.

The main plot concerns Janet Wolsley, a woman who finds severed heads in the garden of the mansion she keeps, Elssworth House. The heads are marked with numbers, and the investigation starts from there; more heads are found in the garden, and the Wolseys become suspected; but Nicole, their daughter, takes them on the trail of Connie Kerr, a former tennis player, who has gone insane but seems to know many things.

Connie Kerr reveals she has found and dug out many more heads in the garden; she intrudes on Nicole Wolsey's house to interrogate her, but Nicole tries to stab her; Janet comes out and says it was actually her.

It was finally discovered that it was both of them, in their thirst for revenge against Harry Chandler, Ellsworth's House's owner, who was Janet's lover but cheated on her with many lovers, who became the victims of their furious anger.

== Reviews ==
At least two professional reviews were written about this book. Joe Hartlaub wrote on the Book Reporter website, "The 11th Hour... may be the best Women's Murder Club novel to date."
