= The 6th Target =

2007 novel by James Patterson

- First edition
- Author: James Patterson and Maxine Paetro
- Language: English
- Series: Women's Murder Club
- Genre: Thriller, mystery novel
- Published: 2007 (Little, Brown Grand Central Publishing)
- Publication place: United States
- Media type: Print (hardcover)
- Pages: 400 pp (first edition, hardback)
- ISBN: 0-316-01479-6 (first edition, hardback)
- OCLC: 76871458
- Dewey Decimal: 813/.54 22
- LC Class: PS3566.A822 A6156 2007
- Preceded by: The 5th Horseman
- Followed by: 7th Heaven

The 6th Target is the sixth book in the Women's Murder Club series featuring Lindsay Boxer by author James Patterson with Maxine Paetro. It was released on May 8, 2007.

== Plot summary ==
When a horrifying attack leaves one of the four members of the Women's Murder Club struggling for her life, the others fight to keep a madman behind bars before anyone else is hurt. Lindsay Boxer and her new partner in the San Francisco police department run flat-out to stop a series of kidnappings that has electrified the city: children of rich families are being plucked off the streets together with their nannies - but the kidnappers aren't demanding ransom. Amid uncertainty and rising panic, Lindsay juggles the possibility of a new love with an unsolvable investigation, and the knowledge that one member of the club could be on the brink of death.

Lindsay Boxer has to solve three separate mysteries in this novel.

On a ferry, a madman named Alfred Brinkley shoots people and hurts Claire Washburn, SF's ME and Boxer's friend. Ike Quintana, an addict, voluntary points the police to Alfred Brinkley, a madman who hears voices in his head; while Boxer is wondering how to contact him, he spontaneously turns himself to Lindsay herself, going to her house. She arrests him and puts him on trial.

Brinkley is defended by Mickey Sherman, an excellent lawyer who has to fight the People, represented by Yuki Castellano, together with Lindsay and Claire one of the member of the Women's Murder Club.

Sherman convinces the jury Brinkley's legally insane and so he's judged not guilty and simply interned into a criminal asylum.

Some days after the verdict, though, Brinkley kills his warden and escapes.

He goes to meet her mother, who reminds of having killing his sister when he was a boy; Brinkley gets violent again and attempts to kill her. Boxer catches him and finally manages to convict; only to hear Brinkley still threatening her while moved to prison.

A parallel plot deals with a band of pedophiles, led by Paul Renfree, a man who was molested when a boy and now, with the help of his wife, kidnaps young guys with the intent of selling them to the child trafficking mafia; when he tries to kill Madison Tyler, SFPD tails him until they get their identity and manage to stop him and his accessories.

== Release details ==
- 2007, USA, Little Brown ISBN 0-316-01479-6, 8 May 2007, hardback
