= 14th Deadly Sin =

2015 book by James Patterson and Maxine Paetro

- First edition
- Author: James Patterson & Maxine Paetro
- Language: English
- Series: Women's Murder Club
- Genre: Thriller novel
- Publisher: Little, Brown and Co.
- Publication date: May 4, 2015
- Publication place: United States
- Media type: Print (hardcover)
- Pages: 349 pp (first edition, hardcover)
- ISBN: 0-316-40702-X (for first hardcover edition)
- Preceded by: Unlucky 13

14th Deadly Sin, written by James Patterson and Maxine Paetro, is the fourteenth book of the Women's Murder Club series, which currently numbers twenty-three books.

== Plot ==
This book has two main plots and a number of subplots. Detective Lindsay Boxer is attending a birthday party for one of the girls in her group, dubbed by themselves as the Women's Murder Club. As has happened several years in a row on this birthday, she is called away to examine a murder of a woman in a public area and this time in broad daylight with many persons around. Lindsay, with the help of her husband, tracks down leads to find who is responsible for these killings and why.

The second major plot involves a series of robberies, some involving murders, committed by persons in masks and police windbreakers. This series of crimes has shaken the police department badly. The so-called "Windbreaker Cops" must be found and stopped. It is even possible they are cops rubbing shoulders with Lindsay.

== Reviews ==
This book appeared on the USA Today bestseller list for at least 19 weeks and was at one point the top book on this list. The Bookreporter website has a very favorable review of this book. The review says, "Many people consider the Women’s Murder Club to be Patterson’s best collaborative series. If you haven’t yet had the pleasure of sampling the canon, 14th DEADLY SIN is an excellent place to jump on."
