= 7th Heaven (novel) =

Book by James Patterson

- First edition (UK)
- Author: James Patterson and Maxine Paetro
- Language: English
- Series: Women's Murder Club
- Genre: Thriller, mystery novel
- Published: Jan 2008 (Century, UK); Feb 2008 (Little, Brown, US)
- Publication place: United States
- Media type: Print (hardcover)
- Pages: 384 pp (first edition, hardback)
- ISBN: 978-1-84605-250-7 (first edition, hardback)
- Preceded by: The 6th Target
- Followed by: The 8th Confession

7th Heaven is the seventh book in the Women's Murder Club series featuring Lindsay Boxer by James Patterson and Maxine Paetro. It was released first in the UK on 14 January 2008 and then by Little Brown in the US on 5 February 2008.

== Release details ==
- 2008, UK, Century (ISBN 978-1-84605-250-7), pub date 14 January 2008, hardback (first edition)
- 2008, USA, Little Brown (ISBN 978-0-316-01770-1), pub date 5 February 2008, hardback

== Plot ==
Lindsay is confronted by two cases.

There are two thugs called Pidge and Hawk, whose idea of fun is burning people alive.

They kill three couples until they try the big one in the house of a former governor, Connor Campion, whose son has recently disappeared.

Campion reacts, though, and kills Hawk. Pidge flees, but after a search led by Boxer and her team, they find a lead in the college they attended together with the kids of the victims; they were some sort of geniuses who wanted to try the perfect murder without being caught, inspired by the novel The 7th Heaven. After a final confrontation at his house, Pidge, too, is captured and incarcerated.

The parallel story concerns the same Michael Campion, son of a famous politician, who was reported missing but now he's been said to have visited a prostitute - Junie Moon - right before his disappearance.

Junie Moon is interviewed by the police and confesses Campion died in her arms and then, caught by panic, she had called her boyfriend and decided to dismember him and throw him away in plastic bags. Junie is taken to court and tried but found not guilty.

In the meantime, a creepy wannabe writer, Twilly, stalks Yuki Castellano, who had represented the People in the trial and tells her he knows who killed Campion and tries to kill Yuki, too; he's caught in the act, though, and he reveals he knew Campion left Junie Moon alive and he had asked her to make up the whole story in order to write a book.

It is later revealed that Junie Moon had contrived the whole thing; Michael and Junie are lovers who fake his death and run away together.
