= 3rd Degree (novel) =

2004 novel by James Patterson and Andrew Gross

- First edition (US)
- Author: James Patterson, Andrew Gross
- Language: English
- Genre: Crime, mystery novel
- Published: 2004 (Hodder Headline, UK) (Little, Brown, US)
- Publication place: United States
- Media type: Print (hardback & paperback) & audiobook (cassette & CD)
- Pages: 278 pp (hardback edition), 352 pp (paperback edition)
- ISBN: 978-0-7553-0023-5 (hardback edition), ISBN 978-0446696647 (paperback edition)
- OCLC: 59329570
- Preceded by: 2nd Chance
- Followed by: 4th of July

3rd Degree is a crime novel written by James Patterson and Andrew Gross. It is the third novel in the Women's Murder Club Series, and the sequel to 2nd Chance. The book was published on March 1, 2004.

== Plot ==
In this installment after a house with a family home blows up and Lindsay rushes in to save whoever may have survived the blast, a group of killers known as August Spies vow to kill every three days. They target various political figures time and time again. Lindsay Boxer, with the San Francisco PD, Claire Washburn, the medical examiner, Cindy Thomas, a Chronicle reporter who recently broke up with her pastor boyfriend from the previous novel, and Jill Bernhardt, an assistant district attorney who is revealed to have been a victim of spousal abuse, dive into the case. The case takes a deadly turn when Jill is murdered.

Oddly enough this actually leads the remaining three ladies to find a tie-in to a case that Jill's father prosecuted and to a cover-up years old that has launched this terrorist action.

Lindsay resolves the case in typical fashion by bringing in the college professor that caused it all. She had previously decided to make a go of a relationship with her FBI liaison Joe Molinari when he is introduced in the middle of the book. He is deputy director of Homeland Security. He ends up getting a call from the vice president while on a date with Lindsay. Lindsay and Joe have a date while traveling on the case, which ends up being mocked by her former partner (Warren J) while at work. Their second date is at Lt. Boxer's apartment although they ignore dinner because he comes early and they sleep together. Later she feels very guilty because Jill had just thrown out her abusive bullying husband, and ignored a chance to call her or visit with her because of the date.

== Major characters ==
- Lindsay Boxer (protagonist) is a lieutenant for the Homicide department in San Francisco. Lindsay's attention to her case makes her well renowned and established as a lieutenant. When this homicide case was presented to Lindsay, her skills made her capable of solving the case. Even though Lindsay portrays a strong demeanor, her strong traits have left her lacking a love life. Consequently, she focuses on her job, hobbies, and friends. Her friends are Jill, Claire, and Cindy.
