= 4th of July (novel) =

Book by James Patterson

- First edition cover
- Author: James Patterson and Maxine Paetro
- Language: English
- Series: Women's Murder Club
- Genre: Mystery, legal thriller
- Published: 2005 (Little, Brown & Co.)
- Publication place: United States
- Media type: Print (hardcover)
- Pages: 392 pp (first edition, hardback)
- ISBN: 0-316-71060-1 (first edition, hardback)
- OCLC: 56414165
- Dewey Decimal: 813/.54 22
- LC Class: PS3566.A822 A615 2005
- Preceded by: 3rd Degree
- Followed by: The 5th Horseman

4th of July is a mystery and legal thriller by James Patterson and Maxine Paetro.

== Plot introduction ==
Police lieutenant Lindsay Boxer takes leave from the force after being sued for wrongful death after a recent shootout. She stays at her sister’s house in Half Moon Bay, and reads about murders that resemble one that haunted her for 10 years. She joins with the local police to solve the murders, while dreading her awaiting trial.

== Plot summary ==
When Lindsay Boxer gets a lead on a recent murder of two teenagers, she responds to the call and joins Warren Jacobi on a stakeout of a Mercedes. When the car takes off, a high speed chase ends in a crash. The officers discover two teenagers in their father’s car, who are scared and have been hurt. They help them out, but the teens pull guns and both officers are shot. After being hit in the shoulder and thigh, and seeing Jacobi shot twice, Boxer returns fire. The girl is killed, and the boy is paralyzed for life. As Boxer and Jacobi are recovering in the hospital, they are told that everything is legally good, that it was a case of self-defense.

Then, Boxer receives a notice she is being sued by the teenagers' father for wrongful death. Taking a vacation before the trial starts, Boxer housesits for her sister in Half Moon Bay. While there she reads about recent murders in which the victims’ throats were cut and they were whipped. This resembles an unsolved case from before, so Boxer begins to investigate informally. After a few days, the Half Moon Bay police chief tells her to mind her own business, but reconsiders when the next bodies are found. Boxer meets with her friends to try to determine a link between victims as her trial date approaches.

Boxer is found not guilty, and instead of returning to work right away, goes back to Half Moon Bay, determined to solve the recent murders. She is only there a day when the killers leave her a message by shooting up the house. She gets out and follows more clues, discovering that pornography was the common denominator; all stricken families had been victims or producers of porno videos; then finally catches up with a guy who has been following her, a Keith Howard, who had sold her a car and who she liked a lot until then.

He is arrested and provoked about his incapability of being a cruel criminal, he can't resist and confesses to the killings. It is not until Alison Brown, her friend's daughter, shows up at her house that Boxer catches the other two killers, the very same Carolee Brown and Bob Hinton, a local lawyer. They are part of a vigilante group of former sex victims who take the law into their own hands. After they are all arrested, Boxer returns to San Francisco a double hero, for winning the trial and solving the murders.

== Characters ==
=== Members of the Women's Murder Club ===
- Lindsay Boxer – Homicide Department lieutenant, San Francisco Police Department (SFPD)
- Yuki Castellano – defense attorney for Boxer (revealed at end of novel to be the newest member of WMC, replacing the deceased Jill Bernhardt)
- Claire Washburn - San Francisco medical examiner
- Cindy Thomas - reporter, San Francisco Chronicle

=== Others (partial listing) ===
- Warren Jacobi – Inspector with the SFPD
- Sam Cabot – Apprehended suspect who shot Warren Jacobi, shot and paralyzed by Boxer. He is arrested after the trial.
- Sara Cabot - Sister of Sam Cabot, participated in murders and drove getaway car, shot and killed by Boxer in self-defense. (Father Andrew Cabot, a doctor, sues Boxer as a result of the incident.)
- Dr. Carolee Brown – Friend of Boxer. Runs the Bayside School for runaway children, while secretly murdering individuals who she feels are morally worthless.
- Joe Molinari – Boxer's boyfriend; works for the Department of Homeland Security
- Keith Howard – Gas station attendant at the Man in the Moon gas station; assistant to Carolee Brown
- Bob Hinton- Lawyer who "bumps" into Boxer, finds out where she lives: assistant to Carolee Brown

== Release details ==
- 2005, U.S., Little, Brown & Co., ISBN 0-316-71060-1, pub date 2 May 2005, hardcover
- 2005, U.S., Little, Brown & Co., ISBN 0-316-05885-8, pub date 2 May 2005, hardcover large print
- 2006, U.S., Warner Vision, ISBN 0-446-61336-3, pub date 1 June 2006, paperback
- 2005, U.S., Time Warner Audiobooks., ISBN 1-59483-033-9, pub date 1 May 2005, audiobook (CD)
- 2005, U.S., Time Warner Audiobooks., ISBN 1-59483-032-0, pub date 1 May 2005, audiobook (cassette)
- 2006, UK, Headline Book Publishing, ISBN 0-7553-0583-3, pub date 24 April 2006, paperback
