= Maxine Paetro =

American author

Maxine Paetro was born on April 19, 1946 and is an American author who has been published since 1979. Paetro has collaborated with best-selling author James Patterson on the Women’s Murder Club novel series and other standalone fiction.

== Biography ==
From 1975 until 1987, Paetro was a recruiter and EVP creative department manager at several large New York City advertising agencies. In 1979, Paetro published her first book, How to Put Your Book Together and Get a Job in Advertising, which received its fourth revision in August 2010. This non-fiction work has been described as “the advertising industry bible and ultimate insider's guide to getting in and getting noticed".

Between 1986 and 1992, she published three novels: Manshare, Baby Dreams, and Windfall. In 1993, she collaborated with Dodd Darin to write the biography Dream Lovers: The Magnificent Shattered Lives of Bobby Darin and Sandra Dee.

In 2005, she began the first of more than thirty collaborations with best-selling author James Patterson, co-writing 4th of July for the Women’s Murder Club series. Paetro explains in an interview that she and Patterson (who had also worked in advertising before becoming a full-time writer) had known each other since the 1970s. According to British newspaper The Sunday Times, of authors with the most titles to be at number one on The Sunday Times bestseller list over the past forty years, she ranks sixteenth with eleven separate titles in the #1 position.

Her garden, Broccoli Hall, has been featured in national magazines including House & Garden, Victoria, Country Garden and Country Homes. Broccoli Hall is on the Garden Conservancy Open Days Program.

In 2008, Paetro began a project to refine and develop a unique variety of koi known as Ki Shusui. The project developed a cult following and continues to this day. Her exploits can be followed on Koiphen, the largest board for koi hobbyists.

In 2001, Paetro married former surety bond executive, John A. Duffy, the founder and CEO of consulting company, Manhattan Bridge, LLC.

== Works ==
- How to Put Your Book Together and Get a Job in Advertising (1979, nonfiction)
- Manshare (1986)
- Baby Dreams (1989)
- Windfall (1992, ISBN 978-0450565380 )
- Dream Lovers: The Magnificent Shattered Lives of Bobby Darin and Sandra Dee (1993, with Dodd Darin)
- Swimsuit (2009, with James Patterson)
- Woman of God (2016, ISBN 978-0-31627-402-9, with James Patterson)

=== Women’s Murder Club ===
Four San Francisco friends – a detective, a district attorney, a medical examiner, and a crime reporter – join forces to solve mysteries. Paetro co-authored these books with James Patterson beginning with the fourth book in the series. All are New York Times #1 best-sellers.

- 4th of July (2005, ISBN 0-316-71060-1, with James Patterson)
- The 5th Horseman (2006, ISBN 0-316-15977-8, with James Patterson)
- The 6th Target (2007, ISBN 0-316-01479-6, with James Patterson)
- 7th Heaven (2008, ISBN 0-316-01770-1, with James Patterson)
- 8th Confession (2009, ISBN 978-1-84605-258-3, with James Patterson)
- The 9th Judgment (2010, ISBN 978-0-316-03627-6, with James Patterson) (title change from 9th Victim)
- 10th Anniversary (2011, ISBN 978-0-316-03626-9, with James Patterson)
- 11th Hour (2012, ISBN 978-1-84605-791-5, with James Patterson)
- 12th of Never (2013, ISBN 978-0-09957-426-2, with James Patterson)
- Unlucky 13 (2014, ISBN 978-0-316-21129-1, with James Patterson)
- 14th Deadly Sin (2015, ISBN 978-0-316-40702-1, with James Patterson)
- 15th Affair (2016, ISBN 978-0-316-40707-6, with James Patterson)
- 16th Seduction (2017, ISBN 978-1-538-74441-3, with James Patterson)
- 17th Suspect (2018, ISBN 978-0-316-27404-3, with James Patterson)
- 18th Abduction (2019, ISBN 978-1-538-73160-4, with James Patterson)
- 19th Christmas (2019, ISBN 978-1-538-71594-9, with James Patterson)
- The 20th Victim (2020, ISBN 978-1-538-70074-7, with James Patterson)
- 21st Birthday (2021, ISBN 978-1-538-75285-2, with James Patterson)
- 22 Seconds (2022, ISBN 978-0-316-49937-8, with James Patterson)
- 23rd Midnight (2023, ISBN 978-0-316-40278-1, with James Patterson)

=== Jack Morgan ===
- Private (2010, ISBN 978-0-316-09623-2, with James Patterson)
- Private: #1 Suspect (2012, ISBN 978-0-316-19631-4, with James Patterson)
- Private Vegas (2015, ISBN 978-0-316-21113-0, with James Patterson)

=== Confessions ===
The Confessions series is about 16-year-old Tandoori Angel. She lives in New York City's Upper West Side in the famed Dakota. In the first book, she tries to solve the double homicide of her parents, while coping with shocking discoveries about her family and their company, Angel Pharma. In the second book, she tries finding her lost love, James Rampling, and as her memories of him become clearer and clearer, she comes closer to finding him.

- Confessions of a Murder Suspect (2012, ISBN 978-0-316-20698-3, with James Patterson)
- Confessions: The Private School Murders (2013, ISBN 978-0-316-20765-2, with James Patterson)
- Confessions: The Paris Mysteries (2014, ISBN 978-0-316-37084-4, with James Patterson)
- Confessions: The Murder of an Angel (2015, ISBN 978-0-316-30102-2, with James Patterson)
