= Bibliography of Bill Clinton =

This bibliography of Bill Clinton is a selected list of generally available published works about Bill Clinton, the 42nd president of the United States. Further reading is available on Bill Clinton, his presidency and his foreign policy, as well as in the footnotes in those articles.

== Publications by Clinton ==
- Putting People First: How We Can All Change America. Three Rivers Press. 1992. ISBN 978-0-8129-2193-9.
- Between Hope and History. Times Books. 1996. ISBN 978-0-8129-2913-3.
- My Life (1st ed.). Vintage Books. 2004. ISBN 978-1-4000-3003-3.
- Giving: How Each of Us Can Change the World (1st ed.). Knopf. 2007. ISBN 978-0-307-26674-3.
- "Dayton Accords". Encyclopædia Britannica (Online ed.). Chicago: Encyclopædia Britannica, Inc. December 14, 2009. ISSN 1085-9721.
- Back to Work (1st ed.). Knopf. 2011. ISBN 978-0-307-95975-1.
- The President Is Missing (1st ed.). Knopf. 2018. ISBN 978-0-316-41269-8., with James Patterson
- The President's Daughter (1st ed.). Knopf. 2021. ISBN 978-0-316-54071-1., with James Patterson
- Citizen: My Life After the White House. Cornerstone. 2024. ISBN 978-1-80495-309-9.
- The First Gentleman (1st ed.). Little, Brown and Company. 2025. ISBN 978-0-316-565103., with James Patterson

== Popular books ==
- Peter Baker The Breach: Inside the Impeachment and Trial of William Jefferson Clinton (2000) ISBN 0-684-86813-X
- James Bovard Feeling Your Pain: The Explosion and Abuse of Government Power in the Clinton-Gore Years (2000) ISBN 0-312-23082-6
- Joe Conason and Gene Lyons The Hunting of the President: The Ten-Year Campaign to Destroy Bill and Hillary Clinton (2003) ISBN 0-312-27319-3
- Coulter, Ann (September 1, 2002). High Crimes and Misdemeanors: The Case Against Bill Clinton. Regnery Publishing. ISBN 978-0-89526-113-7.
- Elizabeth Drew On the Edge: The Clinton Presidency (1994) ISBN 0-671-87147-1
- David Gergen Eyewitness to Power: The Essence of Leadership. (2000) ISBN 0-684-82663-1
- Gertz, Bill (September 1, 2001). Betrayal: How the Clinton Administration Undermined American Security. Regnery Publishing. ISBN 978-0-89526-196-0.
- Nigel Hamilton Bill Clinton: An American Journey (2003) ISBN 0-375-50610-1
- Christopher Hitchens No One Left to Lie to: The Triangulations of William Jefferson Clinton (1999) ISBN 1-85984-736-6
- Michael Isikoff Uncovering Clinton: A Reporter's Story (1999) ISBN 0-609-60393-0
- Mark Katz Clinton and Me: A Real-Life Political Comedy (2004) ISBN 978-0-7868-6949-7
- Joe Klein (as Anonymous) Primary Colors. (1996) ISBN 0-679-44859-4
- David Maraniss The Clinton Enigma: A Four and a Half Minute Speech Reveals This President's Entire Life (1998) ISBN 0-684-86296-4
- Dick Morris with Eileen McGann Because He Could (2004) ISBN 0-06-078415-6
- Oakley, Meredith L. (June 1, 1994). On the Make: The Rise of Bill Clinton. Regnery Publishing. ISBN 978-0-89526-493-0.
- Richard A. Posner An Affair of State: The Investigation, Impeachment, and Trial of President Clinton (1999) ISBN 0-674-00080-3
- Nathan J. Robinson Superpredator: Bill Clinton's Use and Abuse of Black America (2016) ISBN 978-0692736890
- Mark J. Rozell The Clinton Scandal and the Future of American Government (2000) ISBN 0-87840-777-4
- Timperlake, Edward; Triplett, William C. (February 12, 2013). Year of the Rat: How Bill Clinton and Al Gore Compromised U.S. Security for Chinese Cash. Simon & Schuster. ISBN 978-1-62157-146-9.
- Tyrrell, R. Emmett (July 7, 2015). Boy Clinton: The Political Biography. Simon & Schuster. ISBN 978-1-62157-461-3.
- Walker, Martin (1996). The President We Deserve: Bill Clinton, His Rise, Falls, and Comebacks. Crown Publishers. ISBN 978-0-517-59871-9.
- Patterson, Robert (January 30, 2012). Dereliction of Duty: Eyewitness Account of How Bill Clinton Compromised America's National Security. Simon & Schuster. ISBN 978-1-59698-678-7.*

== Scholarly studies ==
- Berman, William C. From the center to the edge: The politics and policies of the Clinton presidency (Rowman & Littlefield Publishers, 2002) online.
- Conley, Richard S. ed. Historical Dictionary of the Clinton era (Scarecrow Press, 2012).
- Harris, John F. The Survivor: Bill Clinton in the White House (2006).
- Herrnson, Paul S., and Dilys Hill. The Clinton presidency : the first term, 1992-96 (1999) online
- Maney, Patrick J. Bill Clinton: New Gilded Age President (2016) excerpt
- Warshaw, Shirley Anne. The Clinton Years (Infobase Publishing, 2009); 530 pp; encyclopedic coverage plus primary sources
- White, Mark, ed. The Presidency of Bill Clinton: The Legacy of a New Domestic and Foreign Policy (I.B.Tauris, 2012)

=== Domestic policy and politics ===
- Alschuler, Albert W. "Bill Clinton's parting pardon party." Journal of Criminal Law and Criminology 100.3 (2010): 1131-1168.
- Campbell, Colin, and Bert A. Rockman, eds. The Clinton Legacy (Chatham House Pub, 2000)
- Cohen; Jeffrey E. "The Polls: Change and Stability in Public Assessments of Personal Traits, Bill Clinton, 1993–99" Presidential Studies Quarterly, Vol. 31, 2001
- Cronin, Thomas E. and Michael A. Genovese; "President Clinton and Character Questions" Presidential Studies Quarterly Vol. 28, 1998
- Edwards; George C. "Bill Clinton and His Crisis of Governance" Presidential Studies Quarterly, Vol. 28, 1998
- Eksterowicz, Anthony J., and Robert N. Roberts, "The specter of presidential pardons." White House Studies 6.4 (2006): 377-390.
- Erler, H. Abbie. "Executive Clemency or Bureaucratic Discretion? Two Models of the Pardons Process." Presidential Studies Quarterly 37.3 (2007): 427-448.
- Gillon, Steven M. The pact: Bill Clinton, Newt Gingrich, and the rivalry that defined a generation (Oxford UP, 2008).
- Glad, Betty. "Evaluating Presidential Character" Presidential Studies Quarterly, Vol. 28, 1998
- Greenstein, Fred I. "The qualities of effective presidents: An overview from FDR to Bill Clinton." Presidential Studies Quarterly 30.1 (2000): 178-185 online.
- Greenstein, Fred I. “The Presidential Leadership Style of Bill Clinton: An Early Appraisal.” Political Science Quarterly 108#4 (1993), pp. 589–601. online
- Greenstein, Fred I. "There he goes again: The alternating political style of Bill Clinton." PS: Political Science and Politics 31.2 (1998): 179-181.
- Harris, John F. The Survivor: Bill Clinton in the White House (2006). online
- Head, Simon. The Clinton System (January 30, 2016), The New York Review of Books
- Jones, Bryan D. (1995), The New American Politics: Reflections on Political Change and the Clinton Administration, Boulder: Westview, ISBN 978-0-8133-1972-8
- Kim, Claire Jean. "Managing the Racial Breach: Clinton, Black-White Polarization, and the Race Initiative". Political Science Quarterly 117.1 (2002): 55–79. online
- Lanoue, David J. and Craig F. Emmert; "Voting in the Glare of the Spotlight: Representatives' Votes on the Impeachment of President Clinton" Polity, Vol. 32, 1999
- Leshy, John D. "The Babbitt Legacy at the Department of the Interior: A Preliminary View." Environmental Law 31 (2001): 199–227 online
- Maurer; Paul J. "Media Feeding Frenzies: Press Behavior during Two Clinton Scandals" Presidential Studies Quarterly, Vol. 29, 1999
- Nie; Martin A. "'It's the Environment, Stupid!': Clinton and the Environment" Presidential Studies Quarterly, Vol. 27, 1997 in JSTOR
- Poveda; Tony G. "Clinton, Crime, and the Justice Department" Social Justice, Vol. 21, 1994
- Renshon, Stanley A. High hopes: the Clinton presidency and the politics of ambition (1998) online
- Renshon; Stanley A. The Clinton Presidency: Campaigning, Governing, and the Psychology of Leadership Westview Press, 1995
- Renshon; Stanley A. "The Polls: The Public's Response to the Clinton Scandals, Part 1: Inconsistent Theories, Contradictory Evidence" Presidential Studies Quarterly, Vol. 32, 2002
- Troy, Gill. The Age of Clinton: America in the 1990s (2015)

=== Economic and health policy ===
- Altig, David, and Jagadeesh Gokhale. "An overview of the Clinton budget plan." Federal Reserve Bank of Cleveland, Economic Commentary (1993) online.
- Canova, Timothy A. "Legacy of the Clinton bubble." Dissent 55.3 (2008): 41-50. online
- Fisher; Patrick. "Clinton's Greatest Legislative Achievement? the Success of the 1993 Budget Reconciliation Bill" White House Studies, Vol. 1, 2001
- Graetz, Michael J. "Tax Policy at the Beginning of the Clinton Administration." Yale Journal on Regulation 10 (1993): 561-574. online.
- Heckman, James. "Assessing Clinton's program on job training, workfare, and education in the workplace." (No. w4428. National Bureau of Economic Research, 1993) online.
- Laham, Nicholas, A Lost Cause: Bill Clinton's Campaign for National Health Insurance (1996)
- Lavanty, Donald F. "Medicare Meets the Marketplace: The Bush-Clinton Years." in Political Aspects of Health Care (Palgrave Pivot, 2018) pp. 65–78.
- O'Connor; Brendon. "Policies, Principles, and Polls: Bill Clinton's Third Way Welfare Politics 1992–1996" The Australian Journal of Politics and History, Vol. 48, 2002
- Romano, Flavio. Clinton and Blair: the political economy of the third way (Routledge, 2007)
- Rushefsky, Mark E. and Kant Patel. Politics, Power & Policy Making: The Case of Health Care Reform in the 1990s (1998) ISBN 1-56324-956-1

=== Elections ===
- Abramowitz, Alan I. (1995), "It's Abortion, Stupid: Policy Voting in the 1992 Presidential Election", Journal of Politics, 57 (1): 176–186, doi:10.2307/2960276, ISSN 0022-3816, JSTOR 2960276, S2CID 155087138
- Alexander, Herbert E.; Corrado, Anthony (1995), Financing the 1992 Election, Armonk: Sharpe, ISBN 978-1-56324-437-7
- DeFrank, Thomas M.; et al. (1994), Quest for the Presidency, 1992, College Station: Texas A&M University Press, ISBN 978-0-89096-644-0
- De la Garza, Rodolfo O.; Desipio, Louis (1996), Ethnic Ironies: Latino Politics in the 1992 Elections, Boulder: Westview, ISBN 978-0-8133-8910-3
- Germond, Jack, and Jules Witcover. Mad As Hell: Revolt at the Ballot Box, 1992 (1993).
- Goldman, Peter. et al. Quest for the Presidency 1992 (1994)
- Immelman, Aubrey. "The political personalities of 1996 US presidential candidates Bill Clinton and Bob Dole." Leadership Quarterly 9.3 (1998): 335-366. online
- Klein, Jill Gabrielle. "Negativity in impressions of presidential candidates revisited: The 1992 election." Personality and Social Psychology Bulletin 22.3 (1996): 288-295.
- Lipset, Seymour Martin. "The significance of the 1992 election." PS: Political Science and Politics 26.1 (1993): 7-16. online
- Nelson, Michael. "The Historical Presidency: Clinton's Elections: Redividing Government in the 1990s." Presidential Studies Quarterly 46.2 (2016): 457-472.
- Nelson, Michael. Clinton's Elections: 1992, 1996, and the Birth of a New Era of Governance (2020) excerpt
- O'Mara, Margaret. Pivotal Tuesdays: Four Elections That Shaped the Twentieth Century (2015), compares 1912, 1932, 1968, 1992 in terms of social, economic, and political history
- Ornstein, Norman J. "Foreign policy and the 1992 election." Foreign Affairs 71.3 (1992): 1-16. online
- Rosenstiel, Tom. (1993), Strange Bedfellows: How Television and the Presidential Candidates Changed American Politics, 1992, New York: Hyperion, ISBN 978-1-56282-859-2
- Schantz, Harvey L. Politics in an Era of Divided Government: Elections and Governance in the Second Clinton Administration (2001) ISBN 0-8153-3583-0
- Steed, Robert P. (1994), The 1992 Presidential Election in the South: Current Patterns of Southern Party and Electoral Politics, Westport: Praeger, ISBN 978-0-275-94534-3
- Wattenberg; Martin P. "The Democrats' Decline in the House during the Clinton Presidency: An Analysis of Partisan Swings" Presidential Studies Quarterly, Vol. 29, 1999
- Wattier; Mark J. "The Clinton Factor: The Effects of Clinton's Personal Image in 2000 Presidential Primaries and in the General Election" White House Studies, Vol. 4, 2004

=== Political commentary and campaign statements ===
- Barlett, Donald L. and James B. Steele. America: What Went Wrong? (1992).
- Clinton, Bill, and Al Gore. Putting People First: How We Can All Change America (1992)
- Cramer, Richard Ben. What It Takes: The Way to the White House (1992).
- Dionne, E. J. Why Americans Hate Politics (1992).
- Duffy, Michael, and Dan Goodgame. Marching in Place: The Status Quo Presidency of George Bush (1992)
- Edsall Thomas Byrne, and Mary D. Edsall. Chain Reaction: The Impact of Race, Rights, and Taxes on American Politics (1992).
- Ehrenhalt, Alan. The United States of Ambition: Politicians, Power, and the Pursuit of Office (1992).
- Gore, Al. Earth in the Balance: Ecology and the Human Spirit (1992).
- Greider, William. Who Will Tell the People: The Betrayal of American Democracy (1992).
- Jamieson, Kathleen Hall. Dirty Politics: Deception, Distraction, and Democracy (1992).
- Perot, Ross. United We Stand: How We Can Take Back Our Country (1992)
- Phillips, Kevin. The Politics of Rich and Poor: Wealth and the American Electorate in the Reagan Aftermath (1992).
- Sabato, Larry J. Feeding Frenzy: How Attack Journalism Has Transformed American Politics (1991).
- Will, George F. Restoration: Congress, Term Limits and the Recovery of Deliberative Democracy (1992).

=== Foreign and military policy ===
- Campbell, Colin, and Bert A. Rockman, eds. The Clinton Legacy (Chatham House Pub, 2000)
- Cézar, Rodrigo Fagundes. "When and How do Bureaucratic Conflicts Matter in Trade Policy? Evidence from the US Trade Policymaking Process during the Clinton Administration (1993–2001)." Contexto Internacional 39.1 (2017): 201-222. online
- Coady, James. Change and continuity in American Grand Strategy: a comparative analysis of the Clinton and Bush foreign policy doctrines Diss. Institute for the Study of the Americas, 2010.
- Davis; John. "The Evolution of American Grand Strategy and the War on Terrorism: Clinton and Bush Perspectives" White House Studies, Vol. 3, 2003
- Deibel, Terry L. Clinton and Congress: The politics of foreign policy (2000).,
- Downie, Christian. "Three ways to understand state actors in international negotiations: Climate change in the Clinton years (1993–2000)." Global Environmental Politics 13.4 (2013): 22-40. online
- Dumbrell, John. "Was there a Clinton doctrine? President Clinton's foreign policy reconsidered". Diplomacy and Statecraft 13.2 (2002): 43–56. online
- Dumbrell, John. "President Bill Clinton and US transatlantic foreign policy." Journal of Transatlantic Studies 8.3 (2010): 268-278.
- Dumbrell, John. Clinton's Foreign Policy: Between the Bushes, 1992-2000 (Routledge, 2009) 228pp excerpt
- Dumbrell, John. American Foreign Policy: Carter to Clinton (1997), pp 178–196.
- Edwards, Jason Allen. "Foreign Policy Rhetoric for the Post-Cold War World: Bill Clinton and America's Foreign Policy Vocabulary." (2006). online
- Girard, Philippe. Clinton in Haiti: the 1994 US invasion of Haiti (Springer, 2004).
- Green, Michael J. “Engage and Balance”: Bill Clinton and the Unexpected Return of Great-Power Politics." in By More Than Providence (Columbia UP, 2017) pp. 453-481.
- Halberstam, David. War in a time of peace: Bush, Clinton, and the generals (Simon & Schuster, 2001).
- Hamilton, Nigel. Bill Clinton: Mastering the Presidency (Public Affairs, 2007), with numerous chapters on foreign-policy; excerpt
- Hyland, William G. . Clinton's World: Remaking American Foreign Policy (1999) excerpt
- Jewett, Aubrey W. and Marc D. Turetzky; "Stability and Change in President Clinton's Foreign Policy Beliefs, 1993–96" Presidential Studies Quarterly, Vol. 28, 1998
- Leffler, Melvyn P., and Jeffrey W. Legro, eds. In uncertain times: American foreign policy after the Berlin Wall and 9/11 (Cornell UP, 2011)
- Marsden, Lee. Lessons from Russia: Clinton and US democracy promotion (Routledge, 2018).
- Miniter, Richard (February 5, 2013). Losing Bin Laden: How Bill Clinton's Failures Unleashed Global Terror. Simon & Schuster. ISBN 978-1-62157-111-7.
- Murray, Leonie. Clinton, peacekeeping and humanitarian interventionism: rise and fall of a policy (Routledge, 2007).
- Power, Samantha. "A Problem from Hell": America and the Age of Genocide (2002) covers Bosnia, Kosovo, Srebenica, and Rwanda; Pulitzer Prize.online free to borrow
- Radchenko, Sergey. "‘Nothing but humiliation for Russia’: Moscow and NATO’s eastern enlargement, 1993-1995." Journal of Strategic Studies 43.6-7 (2020): 769-815.
- Rivera, David W., and Sharon Werning Rivera. "Yeltsin, Putin, and Clinton: presidential leadership and Russian democratization in comparative perspective." Perspectives on Politics (2009): 591-610 online.
- Sale, Richard. Clinton's secret wars: The evolution of a commander in chief (Macmillan, 2009).
- Sarotte, Mary Elise. "How to Enlarge NATO: The Debate inside the Clinton Administration, 1993–95." International Security 44.1 (2019): 7-41. online
- Shields, Todd G. et al. eds. The Clinton Riddle: Perspectives on the Forty-second President (University of Arkansas Press, 2004), includes three essays by experts on the Cold War, China, and Russia.
- Shifrinson, Joshua R. "NATO enlargement and US foreign policy: the origins, durability, and impact of an idea." International Politics (2020): 1-29.
- Siemers, David J. "Bill Clinton's Contractarian World view: The Intellectual Origins and Public Face of the Clinton Philosophy." Congress & the Presidency 35#2 (2008).
- Smith, Martin A. The Foreign Policies of Bill Clinton and George W. Bush: A Comparative Perspective (Taylor and Francis, 2017)
- Talbott, Strobe. "Clinton and Yeltsin." Diplomatic History 42.4 (2018): 568-571.
- Trenta, Luca. "Clinton and Bosnia: a candidate's freebie, a president's nightmare." Journal of Transatlantic Studies 12.1 (2014): 62-89.
- Tsui, Chin-Kuei. Clinton, New Terrorism and the Origins of the War on Terror (Routledge, 2016). dissertation version
- Walt, Stephen M. "Two Cheers for Clinton's Foreign Policy" Foreign Affairs 79#2 (2000), pp. 63–79 online.
- Yarhi-Milo, Keren. "Bill Clinton and America’s Credibility after the Cold War." in Who Fights for Reputation (Princeton UP, 2018) pp. 223–264.

=== Primary sources on foreign policy ===
- Carter, Ashton B. and William J. Perry. Preventive Defense: A New Security Strategy for America (Brookings Institution Press, 1999).
- Christopher, Warren. In the stream of history: shaping foreign policy for a new era (Stanford UP, 1998).
- Christopher, Warren. Chances of a Lifetime: A Memoir (2001)
- Clinton, Bill. My Life: The Presidential Years Vol. II (Vintage, 2005) excerpt
- Goldgeier, James M., and Michael McFaul. Power and Purpose: U.S. Policy toward Russia after the Cold War (Brookings Institution Press, 2003).
- Nelson, Michael, et al. eds. 42: Inside the Presidency of Bill Clinton (Miller Center of Public Affairs Books, 2016) excerpt pp 193–233, interviews with insiders on Bosnia, Kosovo, Northern Ireland, and the Middle East.
- Perry, William J. My Journey at the Nuclear Brink (Stanford University Press, 2015)
- Talbott, Strobe. The Russia Hand: A Memoir of Presidential Diplomacy (Random House, 2002).
- Rubinstein, Alvin Z. et al. eds. Clinton Foreign Policy Reader: Presidential Speeches with Commentary (2000) [https://www.amazon.com/Clinton-Foreign-Policy-Reader-Presidential/dp/076560583X/
- Talbott, Strobe. Engaging India: Diplomacy, Democracy, and the Bomb (Brookings, 2004)

== Primary sources ==
- Clinton, Bill, Clinton and William Jefferson Clinton. The Speeches of President Bill Clinton (2015) 344pp excerpt
- Clinton, Bill. (with Al Gore). Science in the National Interest. Washington, D.C.: The White House, August 1994.
- --- (with Al Gore). The Climate Change Action Plan. Washington, D.C.: The White House, October 1993.
- Taylor Branch The Clinton Tapes: Wrestling History with the President. (2009) Simon & Schuster. ISBN 978-1-4165-4333-6
- Official Congressional Record Impeachment Set: ... Containing the Procedures for Implementing the Articles of Impeachment and the Proceedings of the Impeachment Trial of President William Jefferson Clinton. Washington, D.C.: U.S. G.P.O., 1999.
- Public Papers of the Presidents of the United States, William J. Clinton. Washington, D.C.: Office of the Federal Register, National Archives and Records Administration: For sale by the Supt. of Docs., U.S. G.P.O., 1994–2002.
- S. Daniel Abraham. Peace Is Possible, foreword by Bill Clinton (2006).
- Michael Waldman. POTUS Speaks: Finding the Words That Defined the Clinton Presidency (2000) ISBN 0-7432-0020-9.
