= Post-presidency of Bill Clinton =

Actions of U.S. President Bill Clinton after leaving office

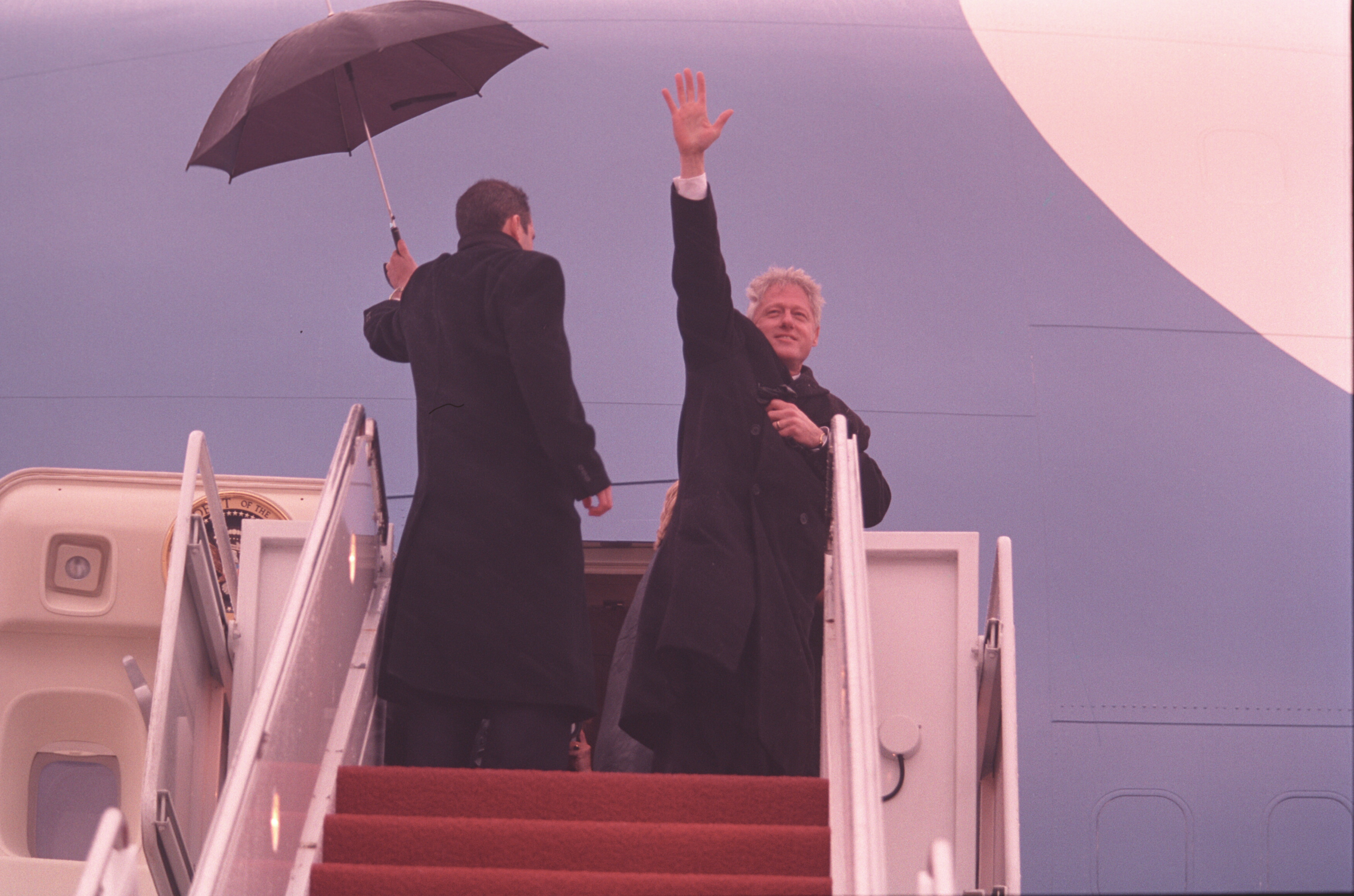
Former President Bill Clinton waves from the departing aircraft after the inauguration of George W. Bush on January 20, 2001

Bill Clinton was the 42nd president of the United States, serving from 1993 to 2001. After the end of his presidency, he continued to be active in the public sphere, touring the world, writing books, and campaigning for Democrats, including his wife, Hillary Clinton, who served as the junior U.S. senator from New York between 2001 and 2009 and the 67th United States Secretary of State between 2009 and 2013, on her presidential campaigns in 2008, in which she was runner-up for the Democratic nomination, and in 2016, when she lost the election to Donald Trump. After Clinton left office, he ended up forming a close friendship with George H. W. Bush, and later, with his son George W. Bush.

== Public speaking and campaigning ==
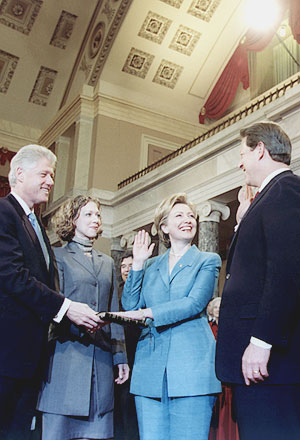
Hillary Rodham Clinton re-enacts being sworn in as a U.S. senator by Vice President Gore as Bill and Chelsea Clinton observe.

At the end of his presidency, the Clintons moved to their house 15 Old House Lane in Chappaqua, New York, in Westchester County. Clinton opened his personal office in the Harlem section of New York City. In 2000, Clinton assisted his wife in her campaign for office as Senator from New York. Clinton campaigned for a number of Democratic candidates for the Senate in the 2002 elections.

Clinton comments on contemporary politics in speaking engagements around the world. One notable theme is his advocacy of multilateral solutions to world problems.

Clinton spoke for the fifth consecutive time at a Democratic National Convention on July 26, 2004, praising candidate John Kerry. He said of President George W. Bush's depiction of Kerry, "strength and wisdom are not opposing values." Despite Clinton's speech, the post-convention bounce to Kerry's poll numbers was less than was hoped for.

Clinton has given dozens of paid speeches each year, mostly to corporations and philanthropic groups in North America and Europe, often earning $100,000 to $300,000 per speech; for 13 speeches he was paid $500,000, or more. According to his wife's Senate ethics reports, he earned more than $30 million in speaking from 2001 to 2005. In 2007, it is estimated he amassed around $40 million from speaking fees. Overall, Bill Clinton earned more than $104 million from 542 paid speeches between January 2001 and January 2013.

Clinton made his first visit to (the at the time) new United Nations Secretary-General Ban Ki-moon in April 2007.

He was the opening speaker at the Ontario Economic Summit held on November 13, 2007 in which he addressed people on various subjects including Canada's role in Afghanistan, environmentalism and access to healthcare.

Clinton served as one of the organizers for the New Baptist Covenant alongside former president Jimmy Carter and other Baptist leaders. This effort sought to bring various Baptists in America together, especially across racial lines, to discuss issues that unite them. Clinton spoke at the January 2008 celebration in Atlanta, Georgia.

== Post 9/11 and relations with Bob Dole ==
Following 9/11, Clinton teamed up with his one-time political rival, former U.S. senator Bob Dole, on the Families of Freedom Foundation, a scholarship fund campaign to pay for the college educations for the families of 9/11 victims. It helped raise more than $100 million. Clinton also was, for a short time in 2003, a commentator opposite Dole on CBS's 60 Minutes.

== William J. Clinton Presidential Center ==
Clinton dedicated his presidential library, the William J. Clinton Presidential Center in Little Rock, Arkansas on November 18, 2004. Under rainy skies, Clinton received praise from former presidents Jimmy Carter and George H. W. Bush, as well as from then-president George W. Bush. He was treated to a musical rendition from Bono and the Edge from U2, who expressed their gratitude at Clinton's efforts to resolve the Northern Ireland conflict during his presidency. The library has the largest archives of any presidential library.

The Clinton facility was funded to a large degree by donations from foreign governments, receiving a $10 million donation from the royal family of Saudi Arabia.

== Published work ==
Clinton released a personal autobiography, My Life in 2004. The book was published by the Knopf Publishing Group at Random House on June 22, 2004. According to the publisher, for single day non-fiction book sales, the book set a worldwide record. Later released as an audio book, total sales were in excess of 400,000 copies. As a writer's fee, he received U.S. $12 million in advance.

He released, Giving: How Each of Us Can Change the World in September 2007, which became a bestseller and gandered positive reviews. The book is about citizen activism and the role of public charity and public service in the modern world. The audiobook version was nominated for a 2008 Grammy Award in the category of Best Spoken Word Album.

In 2011, Clinton released a book "Back to Work: Why We Need Smart Government for a Strong Economy." The book details Clinton's suggestions for improving the economy.

Citizen: My Life After the White House, his second autobiography which covers his post-presidency years, was released on November 19, 2024.

== William J. Clinton Foundation ==
The William J. Clinton Foundation promotes and provides for a number of humanitarian causes. Within the foundation, the Clinton Foundation HIV and AIDS Initiative (CHAI) strives to make treatment for HIV/AIDS more affordable and to implement large-scale integrated care, treatment, and prevention programs. While in Sydney to attend a Global Business Forum, Clinton signed a memorandum of understanding on behalf of his presidential foundation with the Australian government to promote HIV/AIDS programs in the Asia-Pacific region.

The Clinton Global Initiative (CGI), funded by the Clinton Foundation, was inaugurated September 15–17, 2005 in New York City to coincide with the 2005 World Summit. The focus areas of the initiative include attempts to address world problems such as global public health, poverty alleviation and religious and ethnic conflict.

Clinton announced through the William J. Clinton Foundation an agreement by major soft drink manufacturers to stop selling sugared sodas and juice drinks, in public primary and secondary schools within the United States, on May 3, 2005.

The foundation has received donations from a number of foreign governments, including the king of Morocco, a foundation linked to the United Arab Emirates, and the governments of Kuwait and Qatar.

In 2008 newspapers reported that "Mr Clinton had travelled to Kazakhstan with a Canadian mining magnate, Frank Giustra, to meet its dictator president. Mr Giustra later won three lucrative uranium mining contracts from the government and then donated $US31 million to Mr Clinton's charity."

== Relations with George H. W. Bush ==
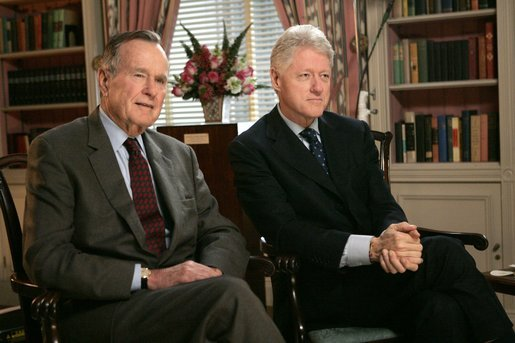
Clinton with former president George H. W. Bush in January 2005

In the aftermath of the Asian tsunami and Hurricane Katrina, Clinton established, with fellow former president George H. W. Bush, the Bush-Clinton Tsunami Fund and the Bush-Clinton Katrina Fund, respectively. He and Bush appeared together in television ads in 2005, encouraging aid for victims of the tsunami and Hurricane Katrina. For this, they were awarded the 2006 Philadelphia Liberty Medal on October 5, 2006.

Then-President George W. Bush, to help the victims of the 2004 Indian Ocean earthquake and tsunami, named Clinton and his father George H. W. Bush to lead a nationwide campaign on January 3, 2005. U.N. Secretary-General Kofi Annan selected Clinton to head the United Nations earthquake and tsunami relief and reconstruction effort on February 1, 2005.

Five days later, to raise money for relief through the USA Freedom Corps, Clinton and Bush appeared on the Fox Super Bowl XXXIX pre-game show. Thirteen days later, to see the relief efforts, they traveled to the affected areas. In April 2007, they spoke together at the funeral of Russian president Boris Yeltsin.

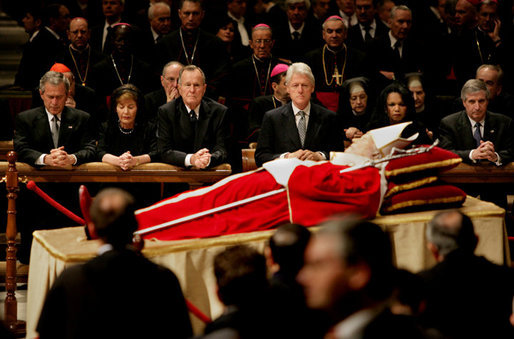
Clinton, along with George W. Bush, Laura Bush, George H. W. Bush, Condoleezza Rice, and Andrew Card pay their respects to Pope John Paul II before the pope's funeral.

== Environment ==
To create the Clinton Foundation Climate Change Initiative (CCI), the William J. Clinton Foundation entered into a partnership with the Large Cities Climate Leadership Group on August 1, 2006, agreeing to provide resources to allow the participating cities to enter into an energy-saving product purchasing consortium and to provide technical and communications support.

Clinton criticized the Bush administration for its handling of emissions control while speaking at the United Nations Climate Change Conference in Montreal on December 9, 2005. To promote initiatives concerning the environment, Clinton twice visited the University of California, Los Angeles in 2006. First, to advertise the Large Cities Climate Leadership Group, he met with Tony Blair, Ken Livingstone, Antonio Villaraigosa, and Gavin Newsom on August 1, 2006. On October 13, 2006, he spoke in favor of California Proposition 87 on alternative energy, which was voted down.

== Personal health ==
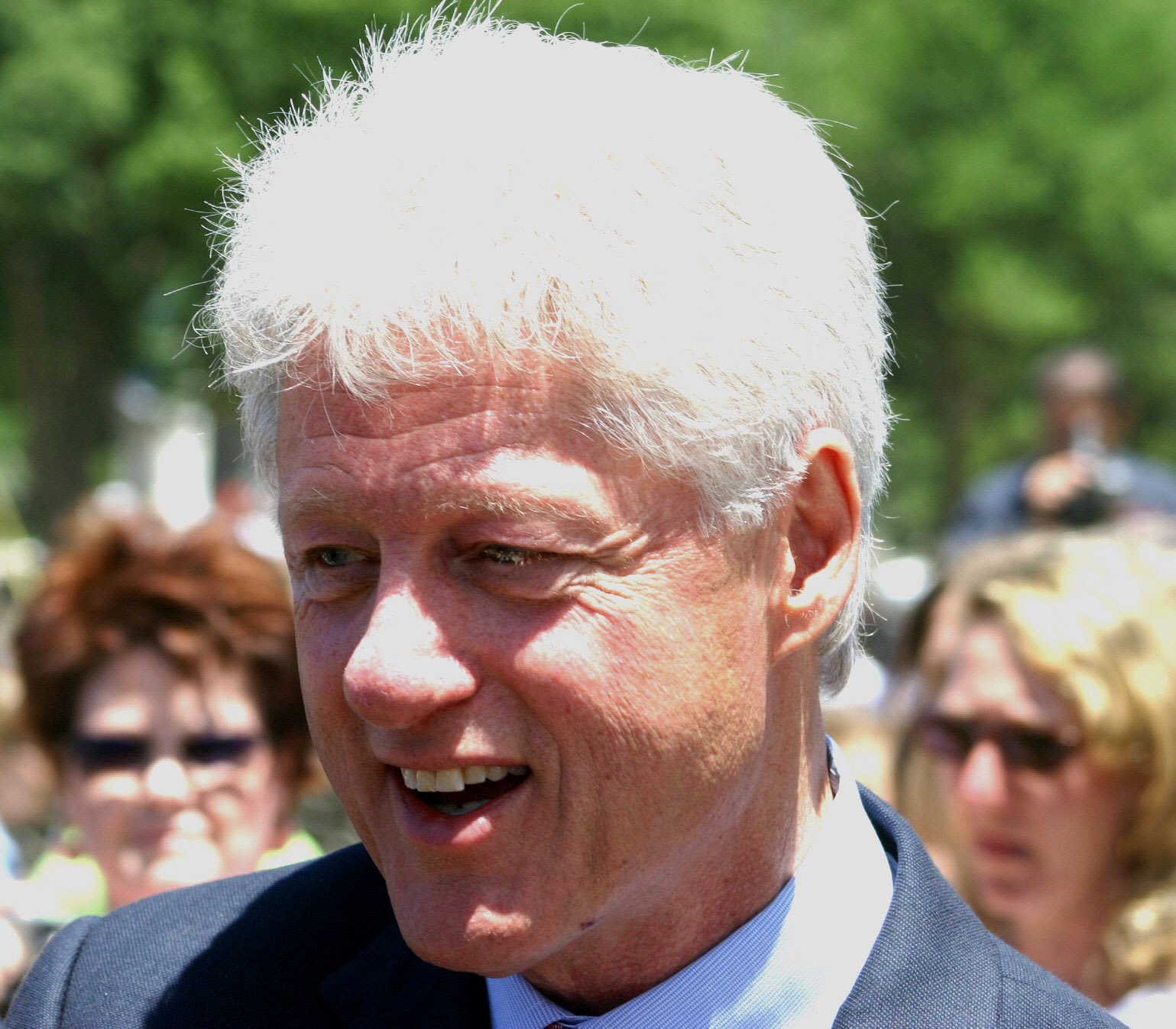
Clinton in 2004

On September 2, 2004, while campaigning for Kerry, Clinton had an episode of angina and was evaluated at Northern Westchester Hospital. It was determined he did not suffer a coronary infarction, and he was sent home, returning the following day for angiography, which disclosed multiple vessel coronary artery disease. He was transferred to Columbia Presbyterian Medical Center in New York City, where he underwent a successful on-pump quadruple coronary artery bypass surgery on September 6, 2004. The medical team stated, had he not had surgery, he would have likely suffered a massive heart attack within a few months. As a complication of his heart surgery, Clinton underwent a follow-up surgery on March 10, 2005 for a left pleural effusion, removing scar tissue and fluid from his left chest cavity.

On February 11, 2010, he was rushed to Columbia Presbyterian Hospital in New York City after complaining of chest pains, and had two coronary stents implanted in his heart. He has since recovered and become a vegan.

== 2008 Presidential election ==
In the course of the 2008 Democratic presidential primary campaign, Clinton vigorously advocated on behalf of his wife, Hillary Clinton, leading some observers and party members to question the appropriateness of his role in view of his status as a former president. Some felt that Clinton was overshadowing his wife in the campaign, with her presidential rival Barack Obama complaining that he sometimes did not know which Clinton he was running against. At an MSNBC debate, Republican primary candidate Mitt Romney said that he "can't imagine Bill Clinton left with nothing to do in the White House", suggesting that Clinton would be a "co-president and try and help manage the economy and help manage the world affairs".

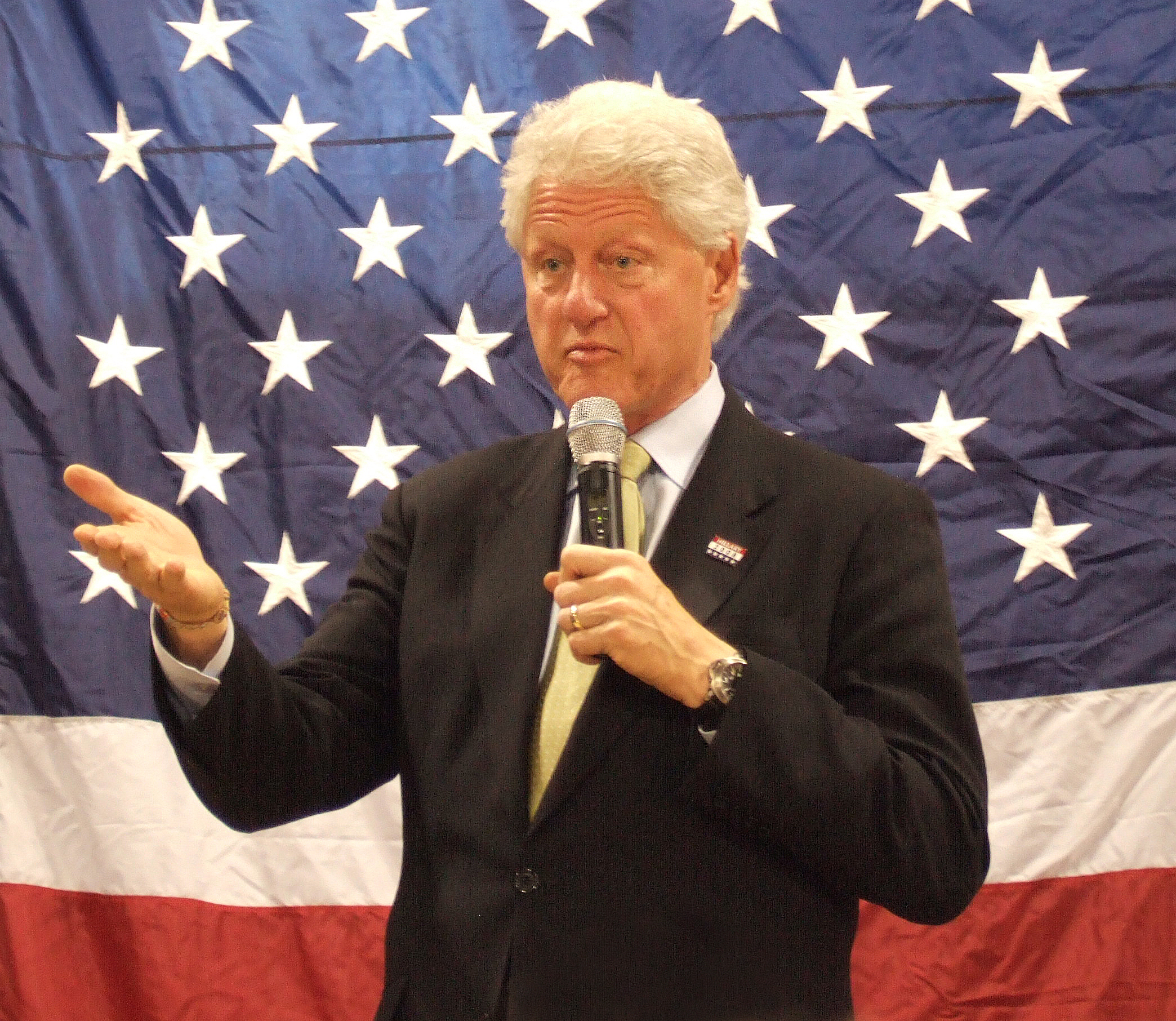
Clinton speaking at a rally for his wife at Dickinson College

Top Democratic Party officials, including Congressman Rahm Emanuel, chairman of the Democratic Congressional Campaign Committee, asked Clinton to tone down his attacks on Obama following the bitterly contested Nevada caucus, suggesting that Clinton could be damaging his own political capital and global stature. Some commentators even accused the former president of "playing the race card" against Obama, who is half-black, by suggesting he would understand if South Carolina's African Americans naturally would vote for the black candidate, but rejected suggestions that America was not ready for a black President. Many felt that by alienating black voters who had once overwhelmingly supported the Clintons, Clinton had tarnished his legacy as the so-called "first black president." In particular, Rep. James Clyburn (D-SC) suggested that Clinton's vocal attacks on Obama could damage the former president's legacy. Following his wife's disappointing defeat in South Carolina, Clinton again made headlines when he appeared to undermine and racialize Obama's victory by comparing it to Jesse Jackson's failed 1984 bid for the Presidency. Some observers suggested that the controversial comments fueled Sen. Ted Kennedy's decision to endorse Sen. Obama for the Presidency. Clinton attracted further controversy with a series of attacks against Obama that many independents and former Clinton supporters felt to be unfair. While some believed the attacks might eventually pay off, others felt they would damage Hillary Clinton's presidential prospects and alienate Democratic voters in the general election. Bill Clinton defended his role in the campaign in South Carolina, disputing claims he made race a campaign issue. According to some reports, the accusations of racism hurt him personally, as blacks had long been Clinton's most loyal supporters.

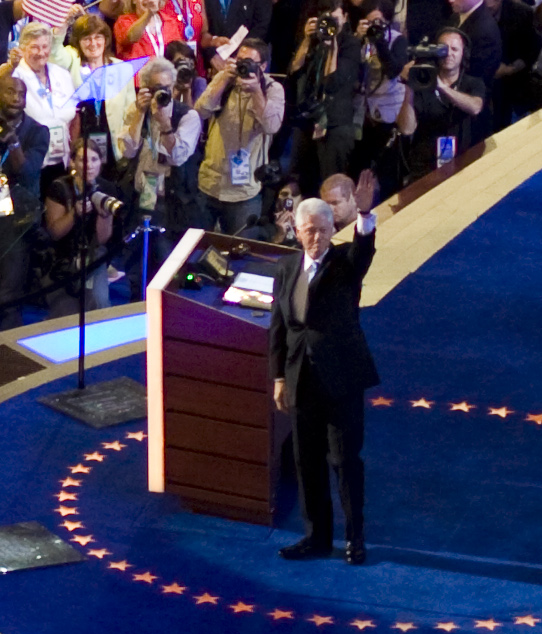
Clinton speaks during the third night of the 2008 Democratic National Convention in Denver, Colorado.

During the primary campaign, his wife's aides criticized Clinton's freelancing and deemed his office uncooperative– at one point, they complained, his people would not allow one of her people to ride on his plane to campaign stops. His aides, on the other hand, stewed over what they saw as her people's disregard for the advice of one of this generation's great political minds and bristled at surrendering control of his schedule. On the night of the Pennsylvania primary, Clinton grew playfully competitive with his wife over who had done more events or had had more impact. Governor Ed Rendell showed Clinton the county-by-county returns, while she was superstitious and rarely watched election night coverage. According to Rendell, "The president wanted to know exactly what the returns were in the places he had been and Hillary hadn't been. He kept showing Hillary, and she would laugh."

Due to Clinton's prominent role in his wife's presidential run and his criticism of Obama, many perceived an enduring distance between the two. Clinton was asked later if he thought presidential nominee Barack Obama was qualified to be president. He replied that the Constitution sets qualifications. When pressed as to whether Obama was "ready" to be president, Clinton replied, "You could argue that no one is ready to be president." Such remarks led to apprehension that the party would be split to the detriment of Obama's election. Fears were allayed August 27, 2008 when Clinton enthusiastically endorsed Obama at the 2008 Democratic National Convention, saying that all his experience as president assures him that Obama is "ready to lead".

== Trip to North Korea ==
Clinton made an unannounced trip to North Korea, a country with which the United States does not have diplomatic relations, on August 4, 2009. Clinton arrived in Pyongyang in order to negotiate the release of U.S. citizens Euna Lee and Laura Ling, who were imprisoned by North Korean forces for illegally entering the country from China while filming a documentary and given a 12-year sentence. His visit to North Korea is the second such trip by a former U.S. president, the other occurring when Jimmy Carter visited in 1994. After meeting with North Korean leader Kim Jong-il, Kim issued a special pardon for the two journalists. On the morning of August 5, the journalists were released from custody and flew home to the United States with Clinton.

== Relations with George W. Bush ==
In 2009, Clinton was named United Nations Special Envoy to Haiti. On January 16, 2010, in response to the 2010 Haiti earthquake, U.S. president Barack Obama announced that Clinton and George W. Bush will coordinate efforts to raise funds for Haiti's recovery. Clinton established, with fellow former president George W. Bush, the Clinton–Bush Haiti Fund.

== 2012 presidential election ==
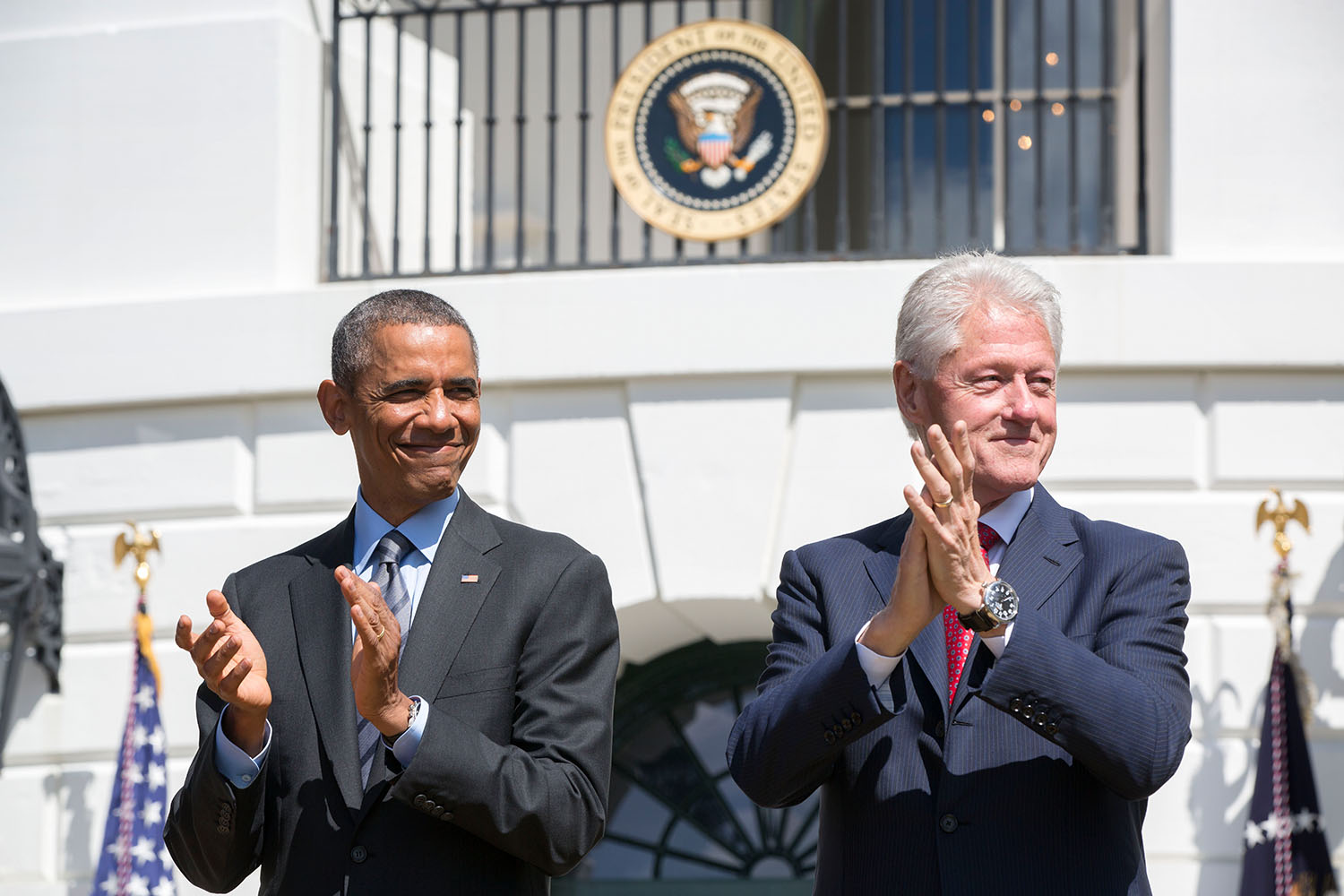
Clinton with President Barack Obama in September 2014

Clinton was a major surrogate for President Barack Obama in the election year, most notably delivering a forty-five-minute speech on the second night of the 2012 Democratic National Convention that was well received in the press, with former Romney consultant Alex Castellanos even stating Clinton had "won the election" for Obama. Clinton remained a powerful surrogate for the president, and was the second person Obama called after receiving Republican candidate Mitt Romney's concession. Clinton also later spoke with Romney, mentioning he felt that Hurricane Sandy had secured Obama's victory. Many, including David Axelrod, have stated Clinton played a crucial role in Obama's campaign.

== 2016 presidential election ==
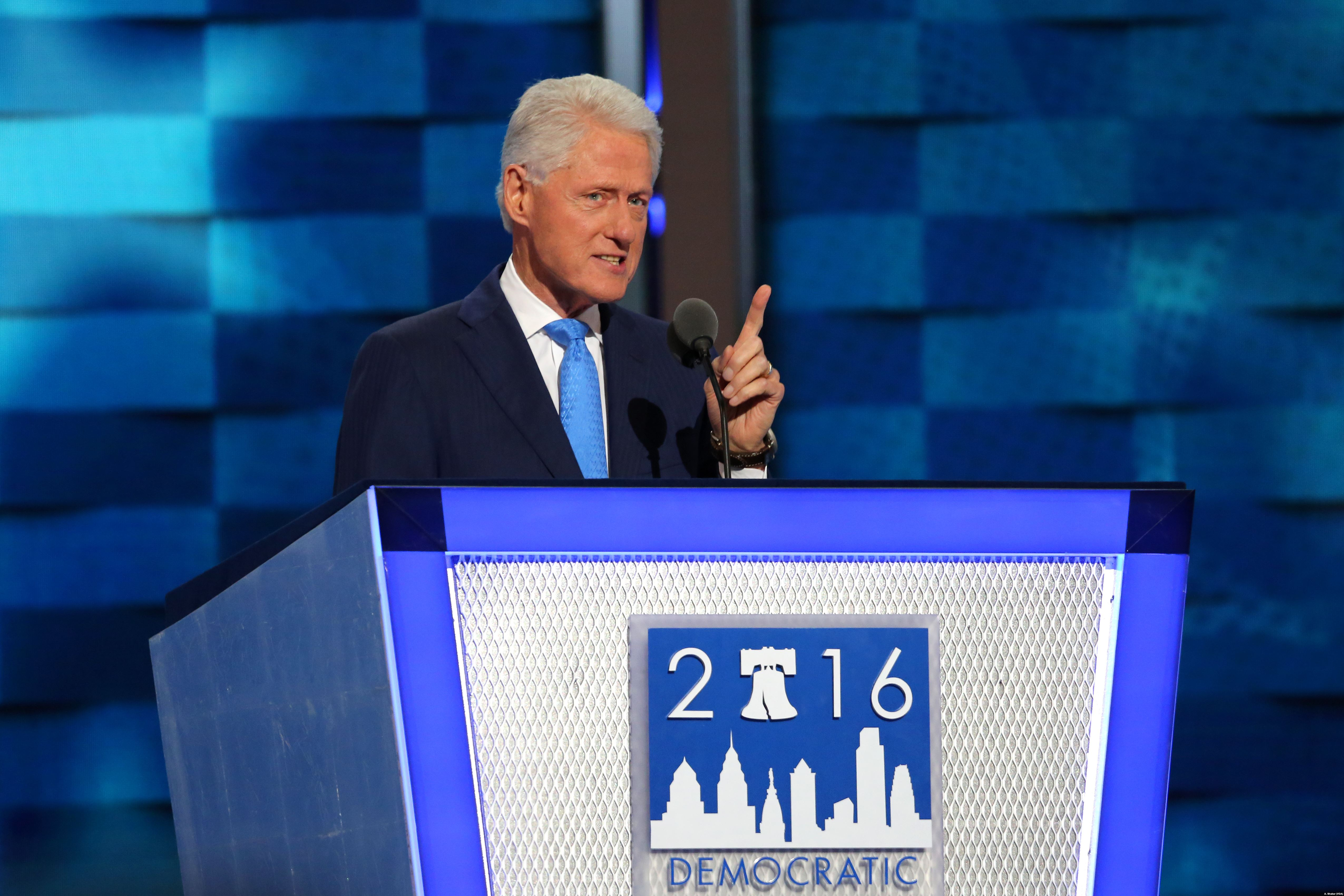
Clinton speaks on the second night of the 2016 Democratic National Convention in Philadelphia.

Over the course of the election year, Clinton supported the presidential campaign of his wife Hillary. In early January, Republican primary frontrunner Donald Trump suggested that Clinton's past infidelities could harm his wife's campaign, Clinton afterward dismissing him: "Donald Trump says a lot of things". On March 21, Clinton made comments about putting "the awful legacy of the last eight years behind us", leading to speculation that he was negatively referring to the Obama presidency. However, on March 24, Hillary Clinton said that her husband was actually referring to the difficulty Obama had in compromising with Republicans.

On June 29, 2016, Clinton had a private conversation with Attorney General Loretta Lynch in Phoenix, Arizona. Clinton's meeting with Lynch, while his wife Hillary was under an FBI probe for the use of a private e-mail server, raised questions about a conflict of interest as well as the ability of the Department of Justice to conduct an independent investigation. Clinton and Lynch insisted that their conversation was purely social.

On November 10, a Clinton aide said he had phoned Trump that afternoon to congratulate the president-elect on his victory. On December 20, Trump tweeted that Clinton called him after the election, which Clinton himself shortly afterward confirmed, and that the former president "doesn't know much" about attracting voters in swing states.

Clinton served as a member of the United States Electoral College for the state of New York. He voted for the Democratic ticket consisting of his wife Hillary and her running-mate Tim Kaine.

== 2020 presidential election ==
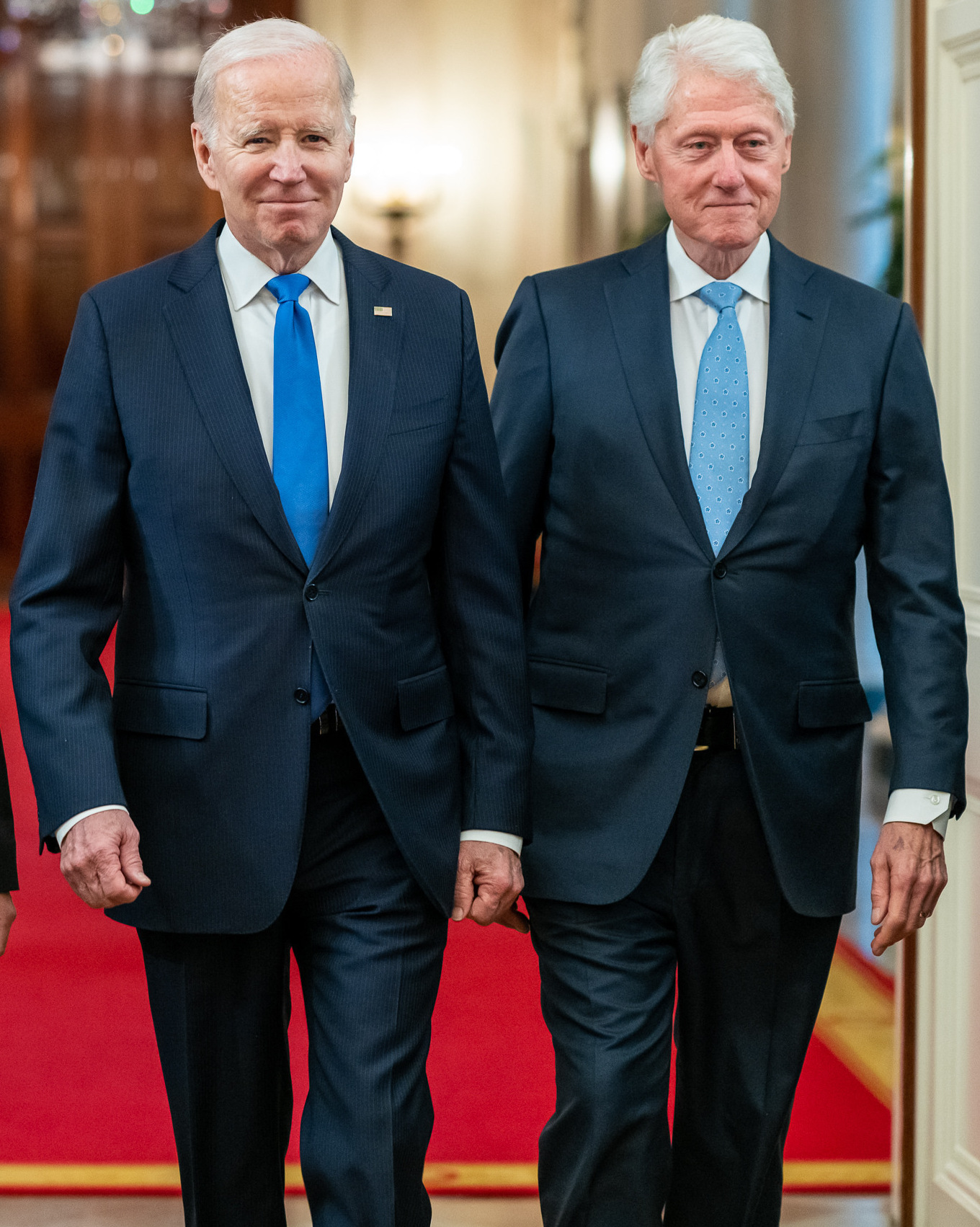
Clinton with President Joe Biden in February 2023

Clinton spoke at the 2020 Democratic National Convention on August 18, 2020 in support of Joe Biden. Clinton again served as a member of the United States Electoral College from New York, casting his vote for the Democratic ticket of Biden and Kamala Harris. On January 20, 2021, the Clintons attended Biden's inauguration. Along with Obama and George W. Bush, Clinton laid a wreath at Arlington National Cemetery's Tomb of the Unknown Soldier, and recorded a segment for the Celebrate America special offering words of wisdom for the new president.

== 2024 presidential election ==
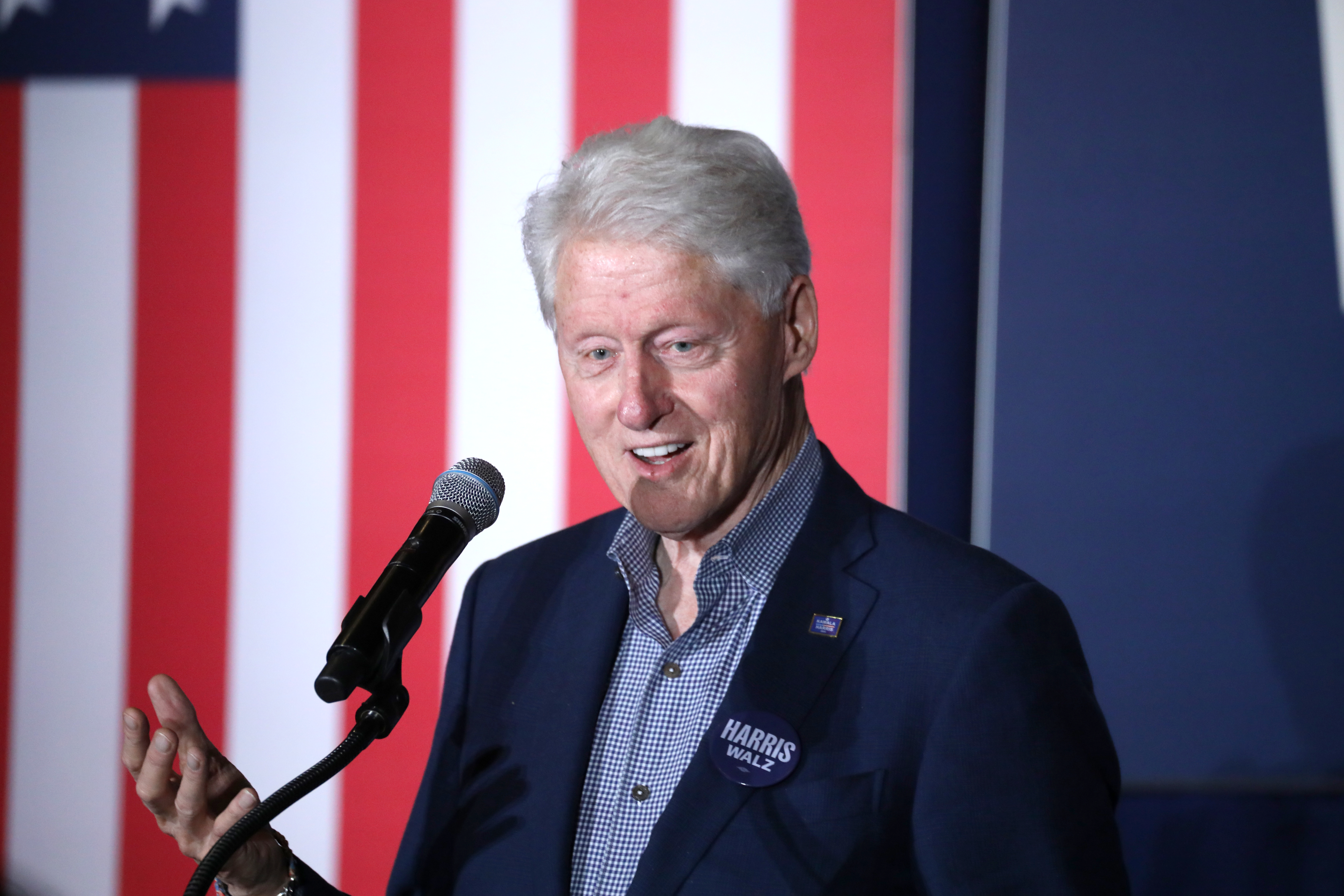
Clinton in October 2024

Clinton condemned the assassination attempt on former president Trump, who was also the presumptive Republican nominee for the 2024 presidential election, on July 13, 2024, expressing relief that Trump was safe and applauded the Secret Service’s response. Clinton later praised Biden's work as president after Biden withdrew from the 2024 presidential election. He appeared on the third night of the 2024 Democratic National Convention, voicing his support for Democratic nominee Kamala Harris.

== Other ==
=== Soccer ===
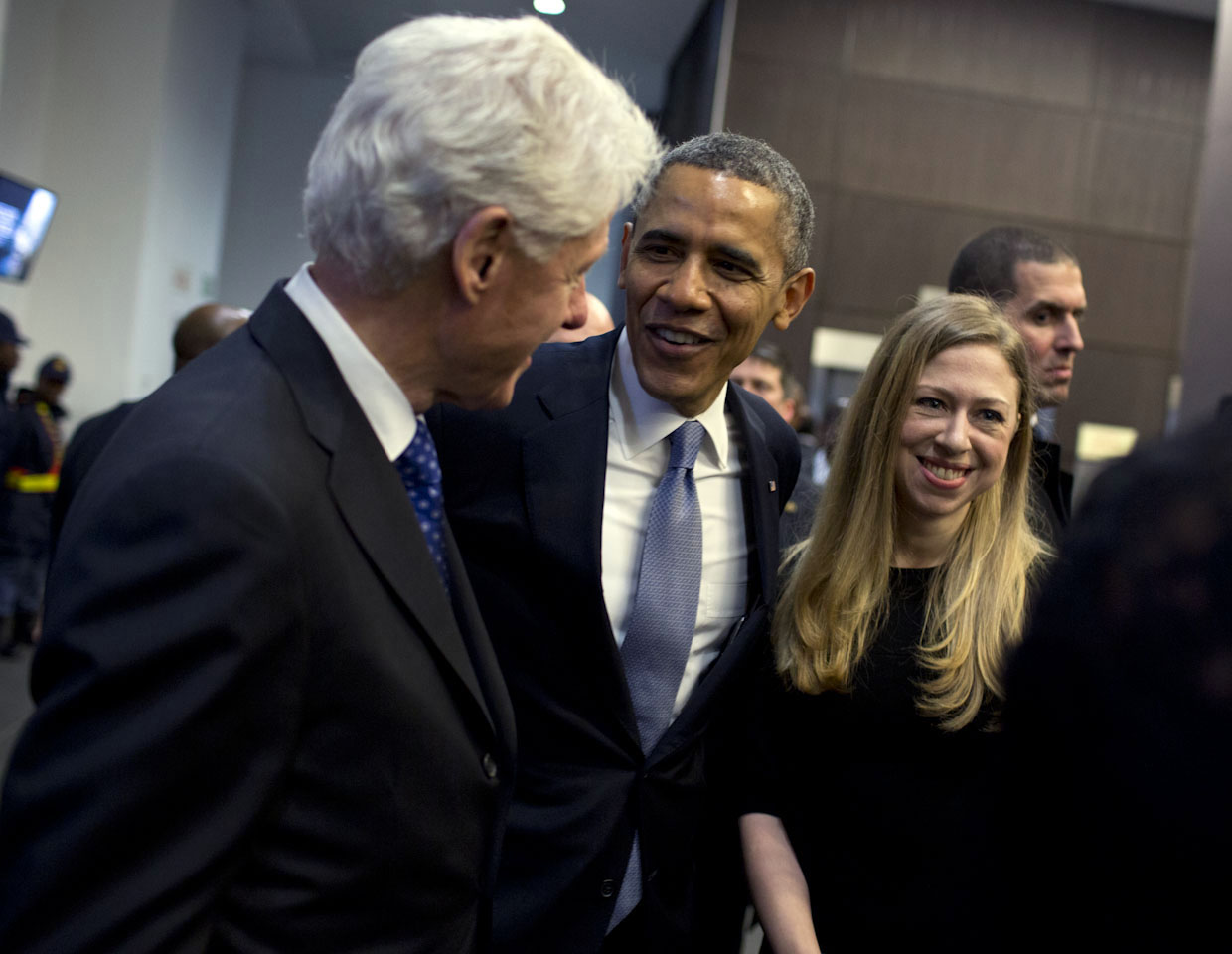
Clinton and his daughter Chelsea with President Obama at Nelson Mandela's funeral in South Africa, December 2013

Clinton was present at the 2006 FIFA World Cup Final. He also visited the 2010 World Cup in South Africa, and was an avid booster of the American team. He was also one of the proponents of the United States 2018 and 2022 World Cup bids. Clinton had been president when the U.S. hosted the 1994 World Cup.

Clinton attended an event marking the 30th anniversary of the Family and Medical Leave Act on February 2, 2023.

=== Disbarment from Supreme Court practice ===
Clinton was disbarred from practicing law before the Supreme Court of the United States in 2001.

=== Fiction writer ===
In May 2017, Clinton announced that he would be co-authoring a book called The President is Missing with best-selling crime novelist, James Patterson. The book was released in June 2018.

=== Foreign funerals ===
The entire Clinton family was present at the 2013 funeral of former South African president Nelson Mandela; Clinton and his wife was present at the 2011 funeral of former Czech president Václav Havel; and Mr Clinton himself was present at the 2005 funeral of Pope John Paul II, the 2007 funeral of former Russian president Boris Yeltsin, the 2015 funeral of former Singaporean premier Lee Kuan Yew, the 2016 funeral of former Israeli president Shimon Peres, the 2017 funeral of former German chancellor Helmut Kohl and the 2019 funeral of former French president Jacques Chirac.

=== Relationship with Jeffrey Epstein ===
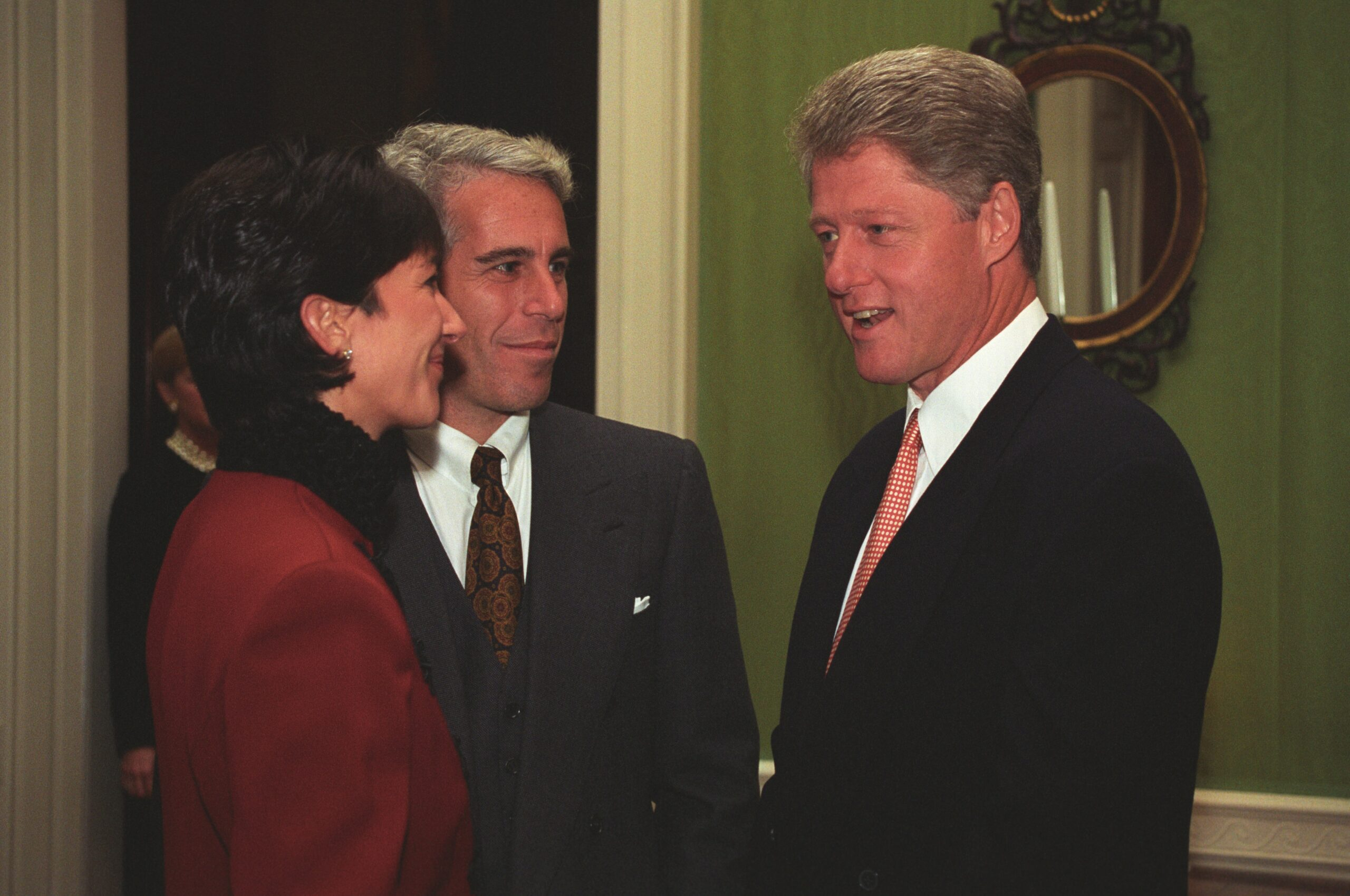
President Clinton with Epstein and Ghislaine Maxwell in the White House, September 1993

According to Jeffrey Epstein's attorney Gerald B. Lefcourt, Epstein was "part of the original group that conceived of the Clinton Global Initiative". In 2002, a spokesperson for Clinton described Epstein as "both a highly successful financier and a committed philanthropist" who "provided 'insights and generosity'". While Clinton was president, Epstein visited the White House at least 17 times between 1993 and 1995; logs show that Clinton was not at the White House for some of the visits. Clinton's office released a statement in 2019 saying that Clinton "knows nothing about the terrible crimes Jeffrey Epstein pleaded guilty to in Florida some years ago, or those with which he has been recently charged in New York. In 2002 and 2003, President Clinton took four trips on Jeffrey Epstein's airplane: one to Europe, one to Asia, and two to Africa, which included stops in connection with the work of the Clinton Foundation. Staff, supporters of the Foundation, and his Secret Service detail traveled on every leg of every trip. [...] He's not spoken to Epstein in well over a decade."

In 1995 the Palm Beach Post reported that Clinton had attended a fundraising dinner for the Democratic National Committee hosted by Ron Perelman at his Palm Beach home for 14 invited guests. The guests included Epstein, singer Jimmy Buffett, actor Don Johnson, Deandra Douglas (wife of actor Michael Douglas), and others, and each guest donated $100,000.

Unverified reports alleged that Clinton flew to Little St. James Island, Epstein's Caribbean island, on Epstein's private jet between January 2001 and 2003. Virginia Roberts, later known as Virginia Giuffre, said in a lawsuit against Prince Andrew, which was settled in 2017, that Clinton had traveled to Little St. James in 2002. A Freedom of Information Act request for United States Secret Service records of visits Clinton may have made to Little St. James produced no such evidence. Epstein's flight logs do not report Clinton flying near the U.S. Virgin Islands. In July 2019, a Clinton spokesperson issued a statement saying Clinton never visited the island. When he was asked by a journalist about his ties with Epstein in a rally in Laredo, Texas in November 2022, Clinton said "I think the evidence is clear." He wrote in his 2024 memoir Citizen that he had found Epstein "odd" but was not aware of his criminal activities, and that he had been out of contact with him by the time Epstein was first arrested in 2005. He also wrote that he had never visited Epstein's island or traveled on Epstein's plane without his Secret Service detail.
