= Back to Work =

Back to Work may refer to:

- Back to Work: Why We Need Smart Government for a Strong Economy, 2011 book by former US President Bill Clinton
- Back to Work Coalition, group of offshore oil and gas industry stakeholders and trade associations
- Back to work legislation, a special law passed by Canada's federal or provincial governments that orders an end to strikes or lockouts and imposes a settlement
