= Kids Helping Kids =

American nonprofit organization

- Founded: December 2002
- Founders: Jamie DeVries
- Type: 501c3 Non Profit
- Purpose: Aiding socio-economically and physically disadvantaged children locally, nationally, and globally.
- Location: Santa Barbara, California, United States
- Region served: Globally
- Method: Donation
- Key people: Jaime DeVries and Jillian Heckman (Vice-President)
- Revenue: $2,500,000
- Volunteers: 180
- Website: kidshelpingkidssb.org

Kids Helping Kids is an entirely student run 501(c)(3) non-profit organization based out of the San Marcos High School AP Economics classes in Santa Barbara, California. Headed by Economics teachers Jamie DeVries and Jillian Heckman, Kids Helping Kids originally began with a student-run penny drive in 2002 and has evolved into an annual signature gala event at the Santa Barbara multimillion-dollar Granada Theatre. Over the course of fifteen years, students have volunteered over 10,000 hours of work, resulting in a gross of $2,500,000 raised for children in need throughout the community and abroad. The Kids Helping Kids mission statement reads: "Empowered students making a difference from the classroom to the community."

== Beginnings ==
Kids Helping Kids was founded in 2002 by one of the San Marcos High School AP Economics classes. Its vision came from teacher Jamie Devries, who wanted to change the stagnant atmosphere of the AP Economics curriculum and give the students a real world application to the principles they learn in class. The organization's first project was a penny drive, enlisting the help of local grade schools and high schools. From there, Kids Helping Kids students hosted a benefit night and silent auction at Santa Barbara's Ruby's Diner, where a portion of each dinner was donated to Kids Helping Kids. Through money raised from food sales, the silent auction, and donations, Kids Helping Kids was able to raise $8,000 for the 2003 year. This money was donated directly to the Santa Barbara Unity Shoppe, a public benefit corporation encouraging self-sufficiency and independence through education and basic necessities. Since then, Kids Helping Kids has grown exponentially; each year, the students have been building off of the accomplishments, both financial and organizational, of the prior class.

== Fundraising ==
=== Signature Concert Gala ===
Kids Helping Kids hit its big break in 2008 when Tyrone Wells, folk-pop singer and songwriter, agreed to perform for a benefit concert. Largely because of the concert, the Kids Helping Kids class of 2008 ended up raising $105,000. 2008 also marked the year that Mark Chipello, Tyrone Wells' personal manager, became Kids Helping Kids' talent buyer. Chipello continues to serve as a liaison between Kids Helping Kids and record industries, securing each year's artist. The following year, the Kids Helping Kids class of 2009 landed alternative rock band Toad the Wet Sprocket to headline, and Tyrone Wells to open, at the now annual benefit concert. 2009 was also the first year the concert was held at the beautiful, historic Granada Theater in Santa, Barbara, CA, where it continues to be held every year. Since then, Kids Helping Kids concert artists have been: Five for Fighting (2010), Matt Kearney with Tyrone Wells (2011), Sara Bareilles with Tyrone Wells (2012), Switchfoot with Brad Corrigan (2013), and Andy Grammer with Tim Lopez (2014), Ingrid Michaelson with Jon McLaughlin (2015), NEEDTOBREATHE with JohnnySwim (2016), Gavin DeGraw with Parachute (2017). Many are Grammy nominated and platinum recording.

=== Sponsors ===
Deckers Outdoor Corporation, a function-orientated footwear manufacturer based in Goleta, California, has been the title sponsor of Kids Helping Kids since 2009. They have generously contributed over $160,000 to Kids Helping Kids. In 2013, the State Farm Youth Advisory Board rewarded Kids Helping Kids a $78,400 grant to facilitate Kids Helping Kids Santa Barbara's mission to expand on a national level.

== Causes ==
A total of $2,200,000 has been raised by Kids Helping Kids. Locally, Kids Helping Kids has donated directly to the Unity Shoppe as well as annually covering the cost of AP tests and lab fees for lower income families. In 2011, Kids Helping Kids helped subsidize the medical and funeral costs for a local student who was killed in car accident. Additionally, the organization replaced a visual aid machine for a local student and gave a grant to a grade school band to purchase brand new instruments. Globally, Kids Helping Kids has funded the building of a preschool and orphanage in Rwanda, which benefits vulnerable orphans and children. Kids Helping Kids also paid for a safe house to be built in Nicaragua, and Ileana's Smile/Ileana's School of Hope, which has its origins from a young girl who lived in a trash dump community in Managua, Nicaragua.

== Recent activity ==
In November 2013, a group of Kids Helping Kids members traveled to the safe house they fund in Managua, Nicaragua. Kids Helping Kids is currently working to expand on a national level. There are currently four branches of Kids Helping Kids, with the Santa Barbara, California chapter acting as the mother organization for high schools in Sacramento, Ojai, and Denver. Kids Helping Kids Sacramento held their first benefit concert in May 2013, raising over $20,000 for charitable purposes. In September 2013, Kids Helping Kids received a $78,400 grant from the State Farm Youth Advisory Board. The grant is intended to provide the students of Kids Helping Kids Santa Barbara with the necessary funds to fly representatives across the country mentoring other high schools in the fundamentals of creating a non-profit organization in Kids Helping Kids name. This years Santa Barbara senior management team consists of CEO Madison Schock, CFO Hunter LaBrie, CMO Abigail Fiedtkou, COO Danielle Terry, Director of Advancement Eliana Bordin, and Director of Outreach Ava Wagner.

== Accomplishments ==
Since 2002, Kids Helping Kids has raised over $2,500,000. In 2011, Kids Helping Kids was recognized with the Subway National High School Heroes Award. In 2013, Kids Helping Kids was awarded a $78,000 grant from the Youth Advisory Board of State Farm Insurance to support our dream of spreading the Kids Helping Kids program to other high schools across the nation.

Year	CEO	Gross Amount Raised	Artist	Location
Class of 2003	N/A	$8,000	San Marcos High School Madrigals	Santa Barbara Ruby's Diner
Class of 2004	N/A	$10,000	San Marcos High School Madrigals and Jazz Band	Santa Barbara Ruby's Diner
Class of 2005	N/A	$12,000	San Marcos High School Madrigals and Jazz Band	Santa Barbara Pizza Mizza Restaurant
Class of 2006	N/A	$24,000	San Marcos High School Madrigals and Jazz Band	Santa Barbara Pascuccis Restaurant
Class of 2007	Michele Trichler	$53,000	San Marcos High School Madrigals and Jazz Band	Santa Barbara Fess Parker Double Tree Resort
Class of 2008	Bryn Kass	$108,000	Tyrone Wells	Santa Barbara Fess Parker Double Tree Resort
Class of 2009	Erik Holliday	$110,000	Toad the Wet Sprocket	Santa Barbara Granada Theater
Class of 2010	Shelby Zylstra	$140,000	Tyrone Wells and Five for Fighting	Santa Barbara Granada Theater
Class of 2011	Ellen Gleason	$165,000	Tyrone Wells and Matt Kearney	Santa Barbara Granada Theater
Class of 2012	Kelly Shara		Tyrone Wells and Sara Bareilles	Santa Barbara Granada Theater
Class of 2013	Jordan Lund	$185,000	Brad Corrigan and Switchfoot	Santa Barbara Granada Theater
Class of 2014	Carter Hudson	$293,000	Tim Lopez and Andy Grammer	Santa Barbara Granada Theater
Class of 2015	Peter Greig	$312,000	Jon McLaughlin and Ingrid Michaelson	Santa Barbara Granada Theater
Class of 2016	Jack Palmer	$461,000	Johnnyswim and NEEDTOBREATHE	Santa Barbara Granada Theater
Class of 2017	Makena Hubbard		Gavin DeGraw and Parachute	Santa Barbara Granada Theater
Class of 2018	Elizabeth Kravchuck		Dave Barns, Andy Grammer and NEEDTOBREATHE	Santa Barbara Granada Theater

== See also ==
- Youth philanthropy
- A Kid's Guide to Giving
