= Justin Cooper (aide) =

Senior Advisor to President Clinton

Justin Cooper is a former adviser to Bill Clinton, former President of the United States. Cooper first worked within the Office of Science and Technology in the Clinton administration before later becoming an aide for Clinton in his post-presidential years.

== Career ==
=== White House ===
Cooper began working in the White House as an intern in the Office of Science and Technology Policy and later in the Oval Office. He was later hired as a staff assistant for Oval Office operations.

=== Post-Presidency ===
Clinton asked Cooper, along with Doug Band, to move to New York to play a critical role in his post-presidential activities.

Cooper has served as senior aide and advisor to President Clinton, becoming a critical member of Clinton's post-presidency cadre of advisors. In his current role, Cooper has traveled with Clinton on hundreds of trips domestically and internationally.

Cooper is frequently credited with assisting President Clinton in editing and recounting his autobiography detailing his formative years and tenure as president in his memoir My Life. President Clinton notes Cooper's critical role in the formation of the memoir in the first sentence of the book's "Acknowledgments." Cooper was integral in transforming Clinton's thoughts into an organized narrative.
He played a similar role on Clinton's second book, Giving.

Cooper, who has a close working relationship with Secretary of State Hillary Clinton and her most senior advisers since their White House days, including Cheryl D. Mills and Huma Abedin, is often responsible for briefing and advising the President on a range of issues including finances, business matters, public relations, politics, the Clinton Family Foundation and the Clinton Foundation's initiatives as well as the Clinton Global Initiative.

In addition to his noted role in the publication of Clinton's memoirs, Cooper is also a frequent travel partner of the President. Most notably, Cooper accompanied the President's delegation to North Korea when Clinton successfully secured the release of two American journalists, Laura Ling and Euna Lee, in August 2009.

Cooper serves on the governing board of the American University of Dubai.

=== Clinton private server ===
Cooper was one of the key persons that help administer Hillary's private email server. Hillary's private server has been part of an ongoing Federal investigation. The internet domain, clintonemail.com, was registered to Cooper, not the Clintons, while she was secretary of state. The domain was registered by Cooper before Hillary became secretary of state on January 21, 2009. Hillary used the email, hdr22@clintonemail.com, on her private server while secretary of state, rather than use a dot gov account for all of her secretary of state work. Cooper had no US security clearance or expertise in computer security. Cooper also helped the Clintons with other tech support. Later, Bryan Pagliano, the former IT director for Clinton's 2008 presidential campaign, was hired to maintain their private email server while Clinton was secretary of state, while the domain was still registered to Cooper. In 2014 clintonemail.com changed to a new registered owner, Perfect Privacy, a proxy company.
