= Youth philanthropy =

Youth philanthropy is the donation of time, energy or resources, including money, by children and youth towards philanthropic causes. According to one study, "youth philanthropy is, at the broadest level, youth giving of their time, talents and treasure." It is seen as an effective means in which youth develop knowledge of and participate in philanthropic projects such as volunteering, grant writing, and community service.

== About ==
Youth philanthropy educates young people about social change in order to identify community problems and design the most appropriate solutions in a systemic way. Philanthropy in this case is defined as anything young people do to make the world around them a better place.

Focused on youth-adult partnerships and youth voice, youth philanthropy is seen as a successful application of service learning. Youth philanthropy helps young people develop skills, knowledge, confidence and leadership abilities. Youth philanthropy is also identified as a particularly effective means for educating children and youth about volunteerism and civic engagement.

Within the Jewish community institutions such as synagogues, day schools, Jewish federations and other organizations have created Jewish youth philanthropy programs to provide Jewish youth with opportunities to engage in grantmaking activities through a Jewish lens. The Jewish Teen Funders Network serves as a central address for Jewish youth philanthropy, and aims to help grow and strengthen the burgeoning field.

== See also ==
- Youth programs
- A Kid's Guide to Giving
- Kids Helping Kids
