= The President's Daughter (novel) =

Novel by Bill Clinton and James Patterson

- Author: Bill Clinton & James Patterson
- Language: English
- Genre: Crime, mystery, thriller
- Publisher: Alfred A. Knopf and Little, Brown & Co.
- Publication date: June 7, 2021
- Pages: 528

The President's Daughter is a political thriller novel by former U.S. President Bill Clinton and novelist James Patterson published in June 2021. It is Clinton's second novel, after The President is Missing (2018).

== Plot ==
U.S. President and former Navy SEAL Matthew Keating oversees an American military operation which enters Libyan territory without permission to raid the base of Islamic extremist terrorist Asim Al-Asheed. The operation kills several of Al-Asheed's accomplices as well as his civilian wives and children, but Al-Asheed escapes. Against the advice of his staff, Keating publicly admits to the operation and apologizes for its failure. Al-Asheed swears revenge on Keating.

Two years later, Keating has lost his re-election campaign and lives quietly in rural New Hampshire with his family. Al-Asheed has built up a new terrorist group and secured the aid of Jiang Lijun, an agent of China's Ministry of State Security, who hates the U.S. because of his father's death in the 1999 U.S. bombing of the Chinese embassy in Belgrade.

Al-Asheed's team infiltrates New Hampshire and kidnaps Keating's daughter, Melanie, while she is hiking. The U.S. government, whose new president still harbours dislike for Keating, refuses to let the latter help with search efforts. Jiang's boss, Li Baodong, orders him to obtain Melanie so that China can gain prestige by returning her to the U.S. However, Jiang privately decides to let Al-Asheed keep Melanie. Jiang meets with Al-Asheed and offers him further support. Al-Asheed escapes an attack by U.S. police and flees the country with Melanie.

Al-Asheed releases a video in which he names his ransom demands for Melanie's release, but Keating deduces that Al-Asheed does not intend to let Melanie live. Keating flees his Secret Service guards and obtains the help of several friends in the American, Saudi and Israeli militaries and intelligence agencies to locate Al-Asheed's new Libyan compound.

Li reveals to Jiang that he recorded the meeting in which Jiang disobeyed the order to negotiate for Melanie, and threatens Jiang with blackmail if he does not complete the task. He also says that the Chinese embassy in Belgrade had a secret military installment underneath it, thus Jiang should not consider his father an innocent victim and should end his grudge against the U.S. Meanwhile, Melanie frustrates Al-Asheed with several escape attempts.

Jiang travels to Al-Asheed's compound and attempts to negotiate for Melanie's handover, but Al-Asheed instead takes him prisoner. Hours later, Keating and his team attack the compound, kill Al-Asheed and rescue Melanie. Jiang pretends to be a civilian and travels back to the U.S. with Keating's team, then escapes into Chinese custody.

The U.S. government declines to charge Keating's team with any crimes. Li kills Jiang for his failures and to cover up China's involvement in the affair. Keating returns to New Hampshire, but vows to run for president again in the next election.

== Reception ==
A reviewer for the New York Times called the book silly, yet highly entertaining. In a more negative review, the Washington Post said that "Clinton has once again revealed such a naked fantasy version of himself that you almost feel embarrassed for the man." Kirkus Reviews commented that the plot is cliché and predictable, but called it "undemanding entertainment". The Standard agreed that the plot was predictable and questioned whether Clinton added any value to the book.
