= Back to Work Coalition =

The Back to Work Coalition is a group of twelve offshore oil and gas industry stakeholders and trade associations, that have banded together to oppose the federal and regulatory policies placed on the industry following the Deepwater Horizon oil well explosion of April 2010. After the explosion, the Obama administration imposed a federal moratorium on deepwater drilling that lasted through mid-October 2010. The Back to Work Coalition was created in December 2010 to combat what the members believe is a "de facto" moratorium, caused by the federal government's hesitance in issuing drilling permits on the gulf's Outer Continental Shelf (OCS). The coalition was founded by Louisiana Department of Natural Resources (DNR) Secretary Scott Angelle. The coalition is facilitated by the Gulf Economic Survival Team (GEST), a non-profit organization created to restore Louisiana's economy following the moratorium.

== Members ==
The Back to Work Coalition Leadership Advisory Committee includes:

- GEST
- Louisiana Oil & Gas Association (LOGA)
- Louisianan Mid-Continental Oil and Gas Association (LMOGA)
- American Petroleum Institute (API)
- National Ocean Industries Association (NOIA)
- International Association of Drilling Contractors (IADC)
- Offshore Marine Service Association (OMSA)
- Offshore Operators Committee (OOC)
- Independent Petroleum Association of America (IPAA)
- Greater New Orleans, Inc (GNO, Inc)
- U.S. Oil and Gas Association
- United States Chamber of Commerce

Participating members of the Louisiana Congressional Delegation include:

- Senator Mary Landrieu
- Senator David Vitter
- Congressman Charles Boustany
- Congressman Steve Scalise
- Congressman Bill Cassidy
- Congressman-elect Jeff Landry

== Background ==
On April 20, 2010, the Deepwater Horizon oil well, a 9-year-old semi-submersible mobile offshore drilling unit owned by BP, exploded in the Gulf of Mexico. The well spilled for three months, resulting in the world’s largest accidental release of oil into marine waters. Federal science and engineering teams estimated that 53,000 barrels of oil per day gushed from the well just before BP managed to cap it on July 15. The daily flow rate was initially around 62,000 barrels per day and gradually decreased as the reservoir of hydrocarbons fueling the spill was depleted.

In response to the environmental hazards caused by the oil spill, the federal government under President Barack Obama implemented a mandatory moratorium on energy exploration and drilling in the Gulf of Mexico. The initial moratorium, issued on May 28, was overturned by a federal court in New Orleans. Subsequently, a second moratorium was put in place on June 12, intended to last until the end of November. This nearly 6-month-long moratorium faced significant opposition from the people of Louisiana due to its adverse economic impact. Local officials, lawmakers, and workers in the oil industry expressed concerns that the moratorium would lead to the loss of hundreds of thousands of jobs and further harm an economy already reeling from the effects of the massive spill.

Following the lifting of the moratorium, the Obama administration introduced a series of regulatory measures that seemed to create obstacles in obtaining drilling permits. This resulted in what Louisiana lawmakers and workers have termed the "de- facto" moratorium, also known as the "permitorium'", on energy production in the Outer Continental Shelf of the Gulf Coast. The de-facto moratorium is the target of Angelle's Back to Work Coalition, which aims to address and overcome the obstacles hindering the issuance of new permits. According to Angelle, the coalition is dedicated to identifying these barriers and actively seeking solutions to facilitate the resumption of energy production. Angelle believes that "the deepwater drilling moratorium may have been lifted, but the federal regulatory challenges continue to delay the return of new drilling in the Gulf. It is time to get the men and women of this industry back to work, as well as the other industries that are dependent upon drilling activity for survival."

== Louisiana oil industry ==
The oil and gas industry plays a pivotal role in Louisiana's economy, contributing significantly in terms of economic impact, tax revenue, and employment opportunities. In Louisiana, the oil and gas industry encompasses four key sectors. Firstly, there is the exploration and production segment, responsible for discovering and extracting oil and natural gas. Secondly, the refining sector processes crude oil into essential products such as gasoline, diesel, and chemical feedstock. The marketing sector includes gasoline stations, while the transportation sector comprises pipelines for transporting crude oil, natural gas, and refined products.

An economic impact study conducted by Dr. Loren Scott reveals that the total direct and indirect impact of the oil and gas industry on the state amounts to approximately $65 billion. The direct impact stems from taxes, royalties, fees, salaries, and other expenditures made by the industry within Louisiana. The indirect impact results from the circulation of salaries and wages earned by industry employees within the state, as well as the business transactions between service companies associated with the oil and gas sector and other industries. Virtually all parishes in Louisiana witness some level of oil and gas activity.

The offshore industry operating in the Gulf of Mexico, beyond the state's territorial boundaries, exerts a significant influence on Louisiana's economy. A study by Applied Technology Research Inc. indicates that the offshore industry directly contributes $3 billion to the state, with over $500 million allocated to salaries and wages for individuals working in the Gulf of Mexico. Additionally, approximately $2.5 billion is spent on services and supplies from Louisiana-based companies that engage with the offshore industry. It is essential to note that all resources utilized on offshore platforms originate from onshore locations.

Furthermore, the refining sector of the industry has an economic impact of $8 billion on the state, with half of this amount directed towards crude oil purchases and the remainder allocated to salaries, wages, services, and supplies utilized at refineries.

(Paraphrased from the Louisiana Mid-Continent Oil and Gas Association Industry Overview)

== Timeline ==
December 2010

On December 8, DNR Secretary Scott Angelle met with Director Michael Bromwich of the Bureau of Ocean Energy Management, Regulation and Enforcement (BOEMRE) in Houma, Louisiana. Angelle described the meeting as "productive," with Bromwich committing that no new rules or regulations would be introduced unless it was deemed irresponsible not to do so.

The following day, on December 9, the Back to Work Coalition convened for its inaugural meeting in New Orleans, Louisiana. During the meeting, the coalition identified the challenges hindering the permitting process. They outlined the need to expedite plan approvals, clarify new regulations and permitting rules, and address NEPA and Environmental Assessment requirements. Executive Director Lori LeBlanc of GEST emphasized the coalition's primary objective of revitalizing the coast's workforce to support America's energy needs. LeBlanc expressed the coalition's intent to actively seek clarification on new rules related to drilling plans and permits issued by the BOEM, and to advocate for the allocation of resources to swiftly process the backlog of drilling plans, especially for deepwater operations, to ensure the efficient movement of permits through the system.

January 2011

On January 3, the Bureau of Ocean Energy Management, Regulation and Enforcement (BOEMRE) informed 13 companies, representing 16 wells, whose deepwater drilling operations were halted by the deepwater drilling moratorium that they might be able to recommence their previously approved activities. BOEMRE clarified that these companies were not required to submit revised exploration or development plans for additional National Environmental Policy Act (NEPA) reviews as long as they adhered to the new policies and regulations set forth by BOEMRE.

On January 11, the National Commission on the BP Deepwater Horizon Oil Spill published its final report, addressing the incident and its implications.

Later, on January 21, the Back to Work Coalition issued a response to the National Commission's report, countering what they perceived as a negative portrayal of the oil companies' efforts following the Deepwater Horizon Oil Spill. The coalition defended the industry's dedication and emphasized the importance of re-employing individuals affected by the incident, advocating for a return to work in the sector.

February 2011

On February 4, Secretary Angelle and members of the Back to Work Coalition met with BOEMRE Director Michael Bromwich for the fourth time in three weeks.

Later, on February 28, the first deepwater drilling permit since the moratorium was issued to Noble for a bypass of an obstruction in a well near Deepwater Horizon that was already in progress before the spill. Angelle and the Back to Work Coalition convened with BOEMRE Director Bromwich for the sixth time in five weeks, where BOEMRE announced that 41 more wells affected by the moratorium may have the opportunity to resume previously approved activities.

March 2011

On March 16, DNR Secretary Scott Angelle provided testimony before the U.S. House of Representatives Committee on Natural Resources, focusing on the economic and community repercussions stemming from the delays in deepwater permitting in the Gulf of Mexico. On March 21, BOEMRE granted approval for Shell's deepwater exploration plan. Following this, on March 24, Chevron received authorization to proceed with drilling an exploratory well in the Gulf of Mexico, marking the first deep-water wildcat well permitted since the previous year's oil spill. Chevron's well represents a significant milestone as it ventures into an unexplored reservoir without prior oil or gas production.

== Controversy ==
The notion of a de facto moratorium, commonly referred to as a "permitorium," is a subject of contention across the country. The ongoing debate between the federal government and Louisiana state leaders regarding planning and drilling permits has sparked intense scrutiny from both proponents and opponents of the concept. Democrats on the House Committee of Natural Resources, in particular, challenge the existence of a 'permitorium,' while others acknowledge its presence but emphasize the critical importance of prioritizing the safety of oil-rig workers and environmental well-being over expedited drilling activities. Rep. Edward Markey, D-Mass., was quoted saying, "There is not a de facto moratorium, only a Republican moratorium on the facts. This hearing is taking place in a parallel universe where we didn't have the nation's worst oil spill last year in which 11 lives were lost. A parallel universe where new drilling is not being approved as we speak."
