= Between Hope and History =

1996 book by Bill Clinton

- First edition
- Author: Bill Clinton
- Language: English
- Publisher: Random House
- Publication date: September 1, 1996
- Media type: Hardcover
- Pages: 178
- ISBN: 978-0-8129-2913-3
- OCLC: 35299616
- Dewey Decimal: 973.929 21
- LC Class: E885 .C54 1996
- Followed by: My Life

Between Hope and History: Meeting America's Challenges for the 21st Century is a 1996 book by then-incumbent United States President Bill Clinton. It was published by Random House in September 1996 in the lead up to the 1996 US presidential election, partly as a means to reach out to the electorate.

The New York Times Book Review described it as "A snapshot of President Clinton's "New Democratic" philosophy as he segues from his first to (he hopes) his second term."
