= The First Gentleman (novel) =

2025 novel by Bill Clinton and James Patterson

- Author: Bill Clinton; James Patterson
- Language: English
- Genre: Crime, mystery, thriller
- Publisher: Alfred A. Knopf and Little, Brown & Co.
- Publication date: June 2, 2025
- Pages: 480
- ISBN: 978-0-316-565103

The First Gentleman is a 2025 political thriller written by James Patterson and Bill Clinton. It was published jointly by Little, Brown and Company and Alfred A. Knopf and released on June 2, 2025. It is the third thriller novel to be written jointly by Patterson and Clinton.

== Plot ==
Former NFL star-turned-political spouse Cole Wright, the First Gentleman of the United States, is put on trial for a 17-year-old murder of a cheerleader just as his wife, President Madeline Wright, is facing reelection. The accusation threatens to derail Wright's political career and diminish her efforts to pass a vital economic package known as the "Grand Bargain." A pair of investigative journalists then race to uncover the truth about the case. The novel weaves together political intrigue, legal drama, and threats of assassination as it explores the immense pressure on the First Couple.

== Reception ==
Kirkus Reviews praised the book, describing it as a "taut yarn" and "just the thing for beach or airplane reading." A mini-review in The Denver Post described it as "a page-turner" but criticized the "jarring" and "wonky" presidential address.
