= A Kid's Guide to Giving =

Non-fiction children's book

- Author: Freddi Zeiler
- Illustrator: Ward Shumaker
- Genre: non-fiction children's
- Publisher: Innovative Kids
- Publication date: 2006

A Kid's Guide to Giving is a non-fiction children's book by Freddi Zeiler, with illustrations by Ward Schumaker. It sets out to teach and inform young people on how to give – both money and other help – to charities and other causes. It was published in 2006 by Innovative Kids in collaboration with By Kids For Kids. The book was recommended by former US President Bill Clinton in his Giving: How Each of Us Can Change the World.

Freddi Zeiler realized when she was in 7th grade that she had a privileged life, seeing that other kids around the world worked all day just so their families could buy food and survive. She searched on the computer for the "perfect charity" for her interests and discovered a lot about charities in the process. She wrote the book to save other children the same effort. The book is a reference of many non-profit organizations that young people can relate to, divided into the categories People, Animals, and Environment.
