= The President Is Missing (novel) =

Novel by Bill Clinton and James Patterson

- Author: Bill Clinton & James Patterson
- Language: English
- Genre: Crime, Mystery, Thriller
- Publisher: Alfred A. Knopf and Little, Brown & Co.
- Publication date: June 4, 2018
- ISBN: 978-0-316-41269-8

The President Is Missing is a political thriller novel by former U.S. President Bill Clinton and novelist James Patterson published in June 2018. It is Clinton's first novel. Clinton and Patterson also teamed up to write a standalone novel with all new characters, The President's Daughter, released in June 2021.

== Plot ==
The book begins with U.S. President Jonathan Lincoln Duncan preparing to defend himself against the charge of negotiating with a terrorist. It has been discovered that the president made a phone call to Suliman Cindoruk, the leader of the cyberterrorist group Sons of Jihad, and that he thwarted an attack on Cindoruk's life.

Duncan's daughter Lilly, who is studying in Paris, receives a coded message from a young Eastern European woman named Nina. Lilly tells her father about the strange person and the message, and she is requested to come back home immediately. Determined to know the source of the leak, the president invites Nina to the White House. She tells the president that in order to get the full story, he must meet with her partner at Nationals Park on Friday. Duncan meets the partner, named Augie. As Augie and the president leave the stadium, an assassin contracted by Suliman Cindoruk shoots and kills Nina. The Secret Service intervenes and extracts Duncan and Augie. The president's convoy heads to Virginia, but they are ambushed again. Two Secret Service agents are killed, but the President is unharmed and drives off with Augie. He arrives at a safe house, where he learns that Nina and Augie created and distributed a highly destructive computer virus called "Dark Ages" for Cindoruk, but they warned the US when they realized what it would do. The virus is scheduled to take effect in a few hours.

In a meeting with the Prime Minister of Israel, Prime Minister of Russia, and the Chancellor of Germany, Augie explains the full extent of Dark Ages: it is an attack that would completely destroy the data on every internet-connected device in the US, leaving the country vulnerable to outside attack and forcing the government to retreat from its foreign policy objectives. Duncan reveals that the US military has quickly built a rudimentary international network to maintain defensive abilities in the event of the Dark Ages virus launching.

The cybersecurity team, with Duncan's help, discover a way of rendering the virus ineffective, so they test it on a server at the Pentagon. This test inadvertently sets off the virus throughout the nation, but it is suspended after deleting only a few files. At the same time, the Sons of Jihad attempt to kill Augie, but are stopped by the Secret Service and a Marine Corps helicopter. Duncan assembles his top aides to try to guess the password. At the last second, his chief of staff correctly guesses the password and disables the virus.

As they return to the White House, Duncan reveals that assembling his team to guess the password was a ruse to discover the leaker. He had already obtained the password from Nina's text messages and entered it himself. The president confronts his chief of staff and tells her that he has evidence that she leaked "Dark Ages", and she tipped off Suliman as well. Duncan learns that Suliman had been sponsored by Russia and a faction in the House of Saud, both of whom wanted to weaken the superpower status of the US so they could expand their territory without interference. The president's popularity soars, and impeachment talks are dropped.

== Adaptations ==
=== Cancelled television adaptation ===
Clinton and Patterson went on a 16-meeting tour to select the right outlet for a theatrical film. However, Showtime initially announced that they were turning the book into an ongoing drama series. Showtime president and CEO David Nevins said that "the pairing of President Clinton with fiction’s most gripping storyteller promises a kinetic experience, one that the book world has salivated over for months and that now will dovetail perfectly into a politically relevant, character-based action series for our network." On October 14, 2020, it was announced that due to the ongoing COVID-19 pandemic, the series would not move forward at Showtime.

=== Film adaptation ===
In January 2026, it was reported that Halle Berry and Holly Jeter's HalleHolly was developing a film adaptation of The President Is Missing with Roth/Kirschenbaum Films for Apple Original Films featuring Berry as a President Joanna Duncan in a gender swap from the novel. Nicole Perlman and David Chasteen were reported to be writing the script.

== Reception ==
In his review of the novel for The New Yorker, Anthony Lane argues that The President Is Missing "maximizes its potency and fulfills its mission" while commenting negatively on the book's prose, the absurdity of its plot, and the use of product placement. James O'Sullivan published an analysis in The Guardian which uses stylometry to show that the novel was primarily written by Patterson.

In a negative review, Will Gompertz of the BBC gave the novel 1 out of 5 stars, calling it "predictable, dull and uninteresting".

The book topped The New York Times Best Seller list by the June 24 edition. Alfred A. Knopf announced that the book sold 250,000 copies in all formats during its first week. Nielsen Bookscan, which represents around 85 percent of print book sales, reported that at least 152,000 of the copies sold in its first week were hardcover. The book's first week sales were the highest in the adult fiction genre since the 2015 release of Harper Lee's Go Set a Watchman and the highest in fiction since the November 2017 release of Diary of a Wimpy Kid: The Getaway. The book again topped the Best Seller list for the July 1 edition, the July 8 edition, and then again for the July 15 edition.

By July 6, 2018, Publishers Weekly stated that the book sold nearly 384,000 copies by the end of June and was the top selling new novel for the entire first half of 2018. The book would also top the Best Seller list for the July 22 edition. It then topped the Best Seller list for the July 29 edition. On August 8, Knopf announced that the book sold one million copies in North America alone.
