= Back to Work (book) =

Book by Bill Clinton

- Author: Bill Clinton
- Language: English
- Publisher: Alfred A. Knopf
- Publication date: November 8, 2011
- Media type: Hardcover
- Pages: 208
- ISBN: 978-0-307-95975-1
- Preceded by: Giving

Back to Work: Why We Need Smart Government for a Strong Economy is a 2011 non-fiction book by former United States President Bill Clinton. Praise appeared in publications such as the Los Angeles Times and the New York Journal of Books, while publications such as The Guardian published more mixed reviews.

== Contents ==
Clinton writes that the American government faces considerable challenges that it is fundamentally struggling to deal with, problems affecting culture and society as well as the current economy. He argues that Americans "have to get back in the future business." He specifically blames a mindset articulated by ideological conservatives and their allies in the modern Republican Party, particularly those connected to the Tea Party movement, for emphasizing cutting government spending and lowering regulations over what he sees as pragmatic government actions that create economic growth and prosperity. Rather than having an inherently anti-government mindset that causes Americans to "hog-tie ourselves", Clinton states that they "need a strong, effective private sector and a strong, effective government that work together".

He describes various areas such as high-school graduations where the U.S. has fallen behind compared to other countries. Clinton concludes, "Over the last three decades, whenever we’ve given in to blame the government for all our problems, we’ve lost our commitment to shared prosperity, balanced growth, financial responsibility, and investment in the future." He criticizes both American parties for not being up to the task of fighting the major economic slowdown, though he writes from a lens of clear sympathy for President Barack Obama and the Congressional Democrats in the face of Republican opposition. "From 1981 to 2009," he writes, looking back to the economy pre-recession, "the greatest accomplishment of the anti-government Republicans was not to reduce the size of the federal government but to stop paying for it."

In terms of specific policies, Clinton advocates changes such as raising the cap on Social Security taxes, reducing military-related spending, and reforming the payment system to medical providers in the Medicare and Medicaid programs. As well, he discusses fighting loopholes in the U.S. tax code, citing how ExxonMobil made $10.7 billion in profits during the second quarter of 2011 with an effective tax rate of only 17.6% (less than the average tax rate of 20.4% for individual Americans). He broadly writes in support of the viewpoints of the bipartisan Simpson-Bowles Commission.

== Reviews and response ==
The Guardian published a mixed review, with author Erik Tarloff arguing that "the book is almost devoid of human interest or any hint of the man's vivid, outsize personality" but also that Clinton had sounded "informed, high-minded, intelligent and persuasive" in making policy recommendations. He viewed parts of the book as "deadly dull" with others "shrewd and convincing", and he claimed that only "in a country whose notionally conservative party has gone so far off the rails would anyone even have bothered to write it." Tarloff also wrote, "Everything in it is worthy, but only a wonk (or a reviewer) would want to read it to the end."

Financial journalist Andrew Rosenbaum praised the work for the New York Journal of Books. He wrote, "President Clinton offers straightforward policy options, supported by statistics and documentation— and what a welcome bit of refreshment this is". He also lauded the book's "extremely detailed" points of policy advice.

The Los Angeles Times also published a supportive review. Reporter Carolyn Kellogg wrote that Clinton had authored "a book with the chutzpah that the Democrats have been missing." She also remarked,

The most interesting thing about this book is not the economic arguments themselves, but that they're being made in one place, in plain language, by Clinton. The former president has blossomed as an elder statesman, standing side by side with both Bush presidents to support emergency relief, forming his nonpartisan foundation and friendships with powerful players of all stripes... close political watchers may take issue with parts of the book— the characterizations are broad, he omits his own administration's healthcare efforts and underplays its role in financial deregulation, his hopes for green technology are rosier than others predict, and very real political influences like money and lobbyists don't factor into his analysis or prescriptions. But Clinton himself seems convinced he's put together a coherent economic picture that is honest, persuasive and necessary.

=== Award nomination ===
The audiobook version of this book was nominated for the 55th Grammy Awards in the category of Best Spoken Word Album.

== See also ==
- Presidency of Bill Clinton
- Simpson-Bowles Commission
- Clintonomics
- Giving: How Each of Us Can Change the World
