= My Life (Clinton autobiography) =

2004 autobiography of Bill Clinton

- First edition cover
- Editor: Justin Cooper
- Author: Bill Clinton
- Cover artist: Bob McNeely (photograph); Carol Devine Carson (design)
- Language: English
- Subject: Autobiography
- Publisher: Knopf Publishing Group (Random House)
- Publication date: June 22, 2004
- Publication place: United States
- Pages: 1,008
- ISBN: 978-0-375-41457-2
- OCLC: 55667797
- Dewey Decimal: 973.929/092 B 22
- LC Class: E886 .A3 2004
- Preceded by: Between Hope and History
- Followed by: Giving

My Life is a 2004 autobiography written by Bill Clinton, the 42nd president of the United States. It was released on June 22, 2004, around three years after Clinton left office. The book was published by the Knopf Publishing Group and became a bestseller; the book sold in excess of 2.3 million copies. Clinton received a $15 million (equivalent to $26 million in 2025) advance for the book, the highest such fee ever paid by a publisher.

== Summary and themes ==
In My Life, Clinton covered his life chronologically, beginning with his early years in Hope, Arkansas, and his family's move to Hot Springs, Arkansas, where he attended school and learned the tenor saxophone. It later had a peripheral role in his political public appearances. He had an early interest in politics, which he pursued in college. He eventually ran for and won the Governorship of Arkansas, and later, the Presidency of the United States. Along the way, Clinton offers anecdotes of ordinary people he had interacted with over the years.

Early in Clinton's life, he recalls listening to his family's stories of others and learning

that no one is perfect but most people are good; that people can't be judged by their worst or weakest moments; that harsh judgments can make hypocrites of us all; that a lot of life is just showing up and hanging on; that laughter is often the best, and sometimes the only, response to pain.

Following his defeat for second term as governor, Clinton remarks, "the system can only absorb so much change at once; no one can beat all the entrenched interests at the same time; and if people think you've stopped listening, you're sunk."

In a political battle, he said that one should wait for an attack from his opponent, then counterpunch as strong and as fast as possible. Early gaffes in Clinton's political career were a result, he believed, of taking too long to respond to attacks.

== Writing process ==
Clinton spent about two and a half years on My Life. He gathered material for four months, wrote an outline, and spent two years and two months writing the book. Clinton advisor Justin Cooper assisted him throughout the writing of the book, transcribing his handwritten drafts onto his computer and providing him with notes, quotes and data. "I wrote it out long hand, left blanks for research, he'd do the research, put it in the computer, print it out, and then we'd edit it," Clinton said. "Every page in this book has probably been gone over somewhere between three and nine times." The original draft for the book was written completely in long-hand. "[There were] 22 big, thick notebooks." The book was edited by Robert Gottlieb. Clinton solicited him after being impressed by Katharine Graham's autobiography Personal History, which Gottlieb had edited.

== Reaction ==
At 1,008 pages, the memoir was chided for its length, with comedian Jon Stewart joking, "I have to confess, I did not finish the entire book; I'm on ... page 12,000." Similarly, then-President George W. Bush joked that it was "10,000 pages long."

In 2007, Teletext carried out a survey of British readers, the results of which revealed that of the respondents who had purchased or borrowed My Life, 30 percent had either not read it, or had begun to read it but had not finished it.

Clinton's former advisor Dick Morris wrote a rebuttal named Because He Could (2004), criticizing My Life. In his own book, Morris presented what he believed to be factual inaccuracies of different events Clinton depicted in My Life.

White House intern Monica Lewinsky was also highly critical of the book, particularly the passages in which Clinton writes about his affair with her, saying that she had thought he would "correct the false statements he made when he was trying to protect the presidency."

Clinton earned US$30 million as of April 2008 from the sales of My Life and his follow-up book, Giving: How Each of Us Can Change the World.

== Editions ==
In addition to the full-volume hardback that was initially released, several other editions followed, including: a limited deluxe edition that was numbered, slipcased, and autographed (ISBN 978-1400044504); trade paperback; abridged audio (read by Bill Clinton); unabridged audio (read by Michael Beck); and a mass market paperback edition separated into two volumes. The audiobook edition, read by Clinton and published by Random House Audio, won the 2005 Grammy Award for Best Spoken Word Album.

This was the second time Clinton had won the award; in February 2004, Clinton (along with former leader of the Soviet Union Mikhail Gorbachev and actress Sophia Loren) won the Grammy Award for Best Spoken Word Album for Children. They were narrators for the Russian National Orchestra's album Peter and the Wolf/Wolf Tracks.

== See also ==
- List of autobiographies by presidents of the United States
- Citizen: My Life After the White House
