= Citizen (Clinton book) =

2024 memoir by Bill Clinton

Citizen: My Life After the White House
- Author: Bill Clinton
- Language: English
- Subject: American politics
- Genre: Memoir
- Published: November 21, 2024
- Publisher: Alfred A. Knopf
- Publication place: United States
- Pages: 464
- ISBN: 9781804953099

Citizen: My Life After the White House is the second volume of memoirs by former president of the United States Bill Clinton. It was published on 19 November 2024. It covers Clinton's post-presidential years, following on from Clinton's My Life of 2004.

== Reception ==
A reviewer for The Guardian described the book as a "prolonged stroll down memory lane that never quite reaches a desired destination". Kara Kennedy of The Telegraph wrote that Citizen is an "eloquent if unremarkable page-turner", but lauded Clinton's "memory and attention to detail", quipping that it almost seemed like "throughout his presidency [Clinton] was gearing up for this second act: Bill Clinton, memoirist."
