= Giving: How Each of Us Can Change the World =

Book by Bill Clinton

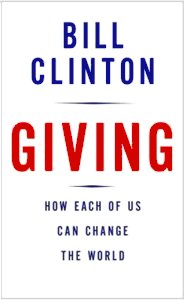
- Front Cover
- Author: Bill Clinton
- Language: English
- Publisher: Alfred A. Knopf
- Publication date: September 2007
- Media type: Hardcover
- Pages: 240
- ISBN: 978-0-307-26674-3
- OCLC: 166269479
- Dewey Decimal: 361.7 22
- LC Class: HN18 .C477 2007
- Preceded by: My Life
- Followed by: Back to Work

Giving: How Each of Us Can Change the World is a 2007 book by former United States President Bill Clinton. It was published by Knopf in September 2007. With an initial print run of 750,000 copies, it debuted at the top of the New York Times Best Seller list in its first week. It was announced that an unspecified portion of proceeds would go to causes mentioned in the book. Clinton ultimately donated $1 million of the proceeds to charity. At the time the book was released, his wife Hillary Rodham Clinton, then the junior United States senator from New York, was seeking the Democratic nomination for President.

Peter Baker, writing a review for the Washington Post, described it as Bill Clinton's version of his wife's 1996 book It Takes a Village. The book details efforts funded by the Clinton Foundation or which Clinton otherwise admires, with a message encouraging readers to join in. The book mentions the charity work of well-known people like Oprah Winfrey, Andre Agassi, and Warren Buffett, why each chooses to do it, and also mentions lesser known instances of charity.

The book can be used as a guide for fundraising by the NGO and INGO activists.

== Reception ==
Baker called Giving an "extended public service announcement masquerading as a book" that offers "little in the way of personal introspection". John Freeman, writing for Newsday, was more favorable, calling Giving "powerful, inspirational guide" for everyday citizens that rose above simply being a political move.

As of April 2008, Clinton had earned $30 million from the sales of Giving and his previous book, My Life. He made $6.3 million from Giving, minus the $1 million he gave to charity.

== Award nomination ==
The audiobook version of this book was nominated for a Grammy Award in the category of Best Spoken Word Album.

== See also ==
- Back to Work: Why We Need Smart Government for a Strong Economy
- A Kid's Guide to Giving

Preceded by Wonderful Tonight by Pattie Boyd and Penny Junor	#1 New York Times Best Seller Non-Fiction; September 23, 2007	Succeeded by Power to the People by Laura Ingraham
