= List of The New York Times number-one books of 2014 =

The American daily newspaper The New York Times publishes multiple weekly lists ranking the best selling books in the United States. The lists are split into three genres—fiction, nonfiction and children's books. Both the fiction and nonfiction lists are further split into multiple lists.

== Fiction ==
The following list ranks the number-one best selling fiction books, in the combined print and e-books category. The most popular books of the year were The Goldfinch, by Donna Tartt and Gone Girl, by Gillian Flynn with 4 weeks at the top.

Date	Book	Author
January 5	Sycamore Row	John Grisham
January 12	Sycamore Row	John Grisham
January 19	Sycamore Row	John Grisham
January 26	The Invention of Wings	Sue Monk Kidd
February 2	The Goldfinch	Donna Tartt
February 9	The Goldfinch	Donna Tartt
February 16	The Goldfinch	Donna Tartt
February 23	The Goldfinch	Donna Tartt
March 2	Private L.A.	James Patterson and Mark Sullivan
March 9	Concealed in Death	Nora Roberts
March 16	The Chance	Robyn Carr
March 23	Words of Radiance	Brandon Sanderson
March 30	Night Broken	Patricia Briggs
April 6	Missing You	Harlan Coben
April 13	Shadow Spell	Nora Roberts
April 20	The King	J. R. Ward
April 27	Carnal Curiosity	Stuart Woods
May 4	The Collector	Nora Roberts
May 11	The Target	David Baldacci
May 18	The Target	David Baldacci
May 25	Unlucky 13	James Patterson
June 1	Unlucky 13	James Patterson
June 8	The One and Only	Emily Giffin
June 15	Skin Game	Jim Butcher
June 22	Mr. Mercedes	Stephen King
June 29	Written in My Own Heart's Blood	Diana Gabaldon
July 6	Top Secret Twenty-One	Janet Evanovich
July 13	Invisible	James Patterson
July 20	Invisible	James Patterson
July 27	Act of War	Brad Thor
August 3	The Book of Life	Deborah Harkness
August 10	Fifty Shades of Grey	E. L. James
August 17	Big Little Lies	Liane Moriarty
August 24	Outlander	Diana Gabaldon
August 31	Outlander	Diana Gabaldon
September 7	Outlander	Diana Gabaldon
September 14	The Long Way Home	Louise Penny
September 21	Personal	Lee Child
September 28	Festive in Death	J. D. Robb
October 5	Edge of Eternity	Ken Follett
October 12	Gone Girl	Gillian Flynn
October 19	Gone Girl	Gillian Flynn
October 26	Gone Girl	Gillian Flynn
November 2	Gone Girl	Gillian Flynn
November 9	Gray Mountain	John Grisham
November 16	Blood Magick	Nora Roberts
November 23	The Burning Room	Michael Connelly
November 30	Revival	Stephen King
December 7	Captivated by You	Sylvia Day
December 14	Hope to Die	James Patterson
December 21	Gray Mountain	John Grisham
December 28	All the Light We Cannot See	Anthony Doerr

== Nonfiction ==
The following list ranks the number-one best selling nonfiction books, in the combined print and e-books category. The most frequent weekly best seller of the year was Unbroken by Laura Hillenbrand with 12 weeks at the top of the list.

Date	Book	Author	Publisher
January 5	Things That Matter	Charles Krauthammer	Crown Forum
January 12	Things That Matter	Charles Krauthammer	Crown Forum
January 19	Lone Survivor	Marcus Luttrell with Patrick Robinson	Little, Brown
January 26	Lone Survivor	Marcus Luttrell with Patrick Robinson	Little, Brown
February 2	Duty	Robert M. Gates	Knopf
February 9	Lone Survivor	Marcus Luttrell with Patrick Robinson	Little, Brown
February 16	Lone Survivor	Marcus Luttrell with Patrick Robinson	Little, Brown
February 23	Lone Survivor	Marcus Luttrell with Patrick Robinson	Little, Brown
March 2	The Monuments Men	Robert M. Edsel with Bret Witter	Center Street
March 9	The Monuments Men	Robert M. Edsel with Bret Witter	Center Street
March 16	The Monuments Men	Robert M. Edsel with Bret Witter	Center Street
March 23	Twelve Years a Slave	Solomon Northup	Various publishers
March 30	Twelve Years a Slave	Solomon Northup	Various publishers
April 6	Twelve Years a Slave	Solomon Northup	Various publishers
April 13	Thrive	Arianna Huffington	Harmony Books
April 20	Flash Boys	Michael Lewis	Norton
April 27	Flash Boys	Michael Lewis	Norton
May 4	Heaven Is for Real	Todd Burpo with Lynn Vincent	Thomas Nelson
May 11	Heaven Is for Real	Todd Burpo with Lynn Vincent	Thomas Nelson
May 18	Heaven Is for Real	Todd Burpo with Lynn Vincent	Thomas Nelson
May 25	Finding Me	Michelle Knight with Michelle Burford Weinstein	Weinstein Books
June 1	Capital in the Twenty-First Century	Thomas Piketty	Belknap/Harvard University
June 8	One Nation	Ben Carson with Candy Carson	Sentinel
June 15	I Know Why the Caged Bird Sings	Maya Angelou	Random House
June 22	One Nation	Ben Carson with Candy Carson	Sentinel
June 29	Hard Choices	Hillary Rodham Clinton	Simon & Schuster
July 6	Hard Choices	Hillary Rodham Clinton	Simon & Schuster
July 13	Blood Feud	Edward Klein	Regnery
July 20	Unbroken	Laura Hillenbrand	Random House
July 27	Unbroken	Laura Hillenbrand	Random House
August 3	Unbroken	Laura Hillenbrand	Random House
August 10	Unbroken	Laura Hillenbrand	Random House
August 17	Unbroken	Laura Hillenbrand	Random House
August 24	Unbroken	Laura Hillenbrand	Random House
August 31	Unbroken	Laura Hillenbrand	Random House
September 7	Unbroken	Laura Hillenbrand	Random House
September 14	Unbroken	Laura Hillenbrand	Random House
September 21	What If?	Randall Munroe	Houghton Mifflin Harcourt
September 28	13 Hours	Mitchell Zuckoff with members of the Annex Security Team	Twelve
October 5	13 Hours	Mitchell Zuckoff with members of the Annex Security Team	Twelve
October 12	Killing Patton	Bill O'Reilly and Martin Dugard	Holt
October 19	Killing Patton	Bill O'Reilly and Martin Dugard	Holt
October 26	Killing Patton	Bill O'Reilly and Martin Dugard	Holt
November 2	Killing Patton	Bill O'Reilly and Martin Dugard	Holt
November 9	Killing Patton	Bill O'Reilly and Martin Dugard	Holt
November 16	Yes Please	Amy Poehler	Dey St./Morrow
November 23	Yes Please	Amy Poehler	Dey St./Morrow
November 30	41	George W. Bush	Crown
December 7	41	George W. Bush	Crown
December 14	Unbroken	Laura Hillenbrand	Random House
December 21	Unbroken	Laura Hillenbrand	Random House
December 28	Unbroken	Laura Hillenbrand	Random House

== See also ==
- Publishers Weekly list of bestselling novels in the United States in the 2010s
