= Private (novel) =

2010 novel by James Patterson and Maxine Paetro

- Author: James Patterson & Maxine Paetro
- Language: English
- Series: Jack Morgan Series
- Genre: Thriller novel
- Publisher: Little, Brown and Co.
- Publication date: June 28, 2010
- Publication place: United States
- Media type: Print (hardcover)
- Pages: 416 pp (first edition, hardcover)
- ISBN: 0-316-09615-6 (for first hardcover edition)
- Preceded by: This is the first book in this series
- Followed by: Private: #1 Suspect (2011)

Private is the first book of the Jack Morgan series. This novel was written by James Patterson and Maxine Paetro. The Private London series was spun off from the Jack Morgan series.
