= Private: Number 1 Suspect =

2012 book by James Patterson

Private: #1 Suspect
- First edition (US)
- Author: James Patterson & Maxine Paetro
- Language: English
- Series: Jack Morgan Series
- Genre: Thriller novel
- Publisher: Little, Brown and Co.
- Publication date: January 2, 2012
- Publication place: United States
- Media type: Print (hardcover)
- Pages: 486 pp (first edition, hardcover)
- ISBN: 978-0-316-09740-6 (for first hardcover edition)
- Preceded by: Private
- Followed by: Private L.A.

Private: #1 Suspect is the second book of the Jack Morgan series. This novel was written by James Patterson and Maxine Paetro. More books in this series are to follow.

== Plot ==
This book has several plots. The most important one involves Jack Morgan, the owner of Private, a private investigation company started by his father. Morgan comes back from a trip to find a former girlfriend murdered in his bed. Morgan is the number one suspect of this murder and has to clear himself of it or go to a lengthy trial. Morgan also owes a favor to a mobster, a favor he does not want to honor but is in no position to refuse. A third plot is the disappearance of a film star who is already in much legal trouble. Finally, Private seeks to solve a series of hotel murders that are the work of a serial killer.

== Reviews ==
This book received at least three professional reviews, one of them favorable and two of them unfavorable. Joe Hartlaub of Bookreporter said in a very positive review, "Patterson and Paetro’s concept and execution for PRIVATE: #1 SUSPECT is flawless."

In a negative review, the Publishers Weekly website said, "Unrelated subplots, including a serial killer who leaves his victims in different locations of a hotel chain, serve only to add to the book’s length. An evil identical twin doesn’t help with plausibility."
