= Correctional Reception Center =

Prison in Orient, Ohio, US

Coordinates: 39°48′00″N 83°08′57″W

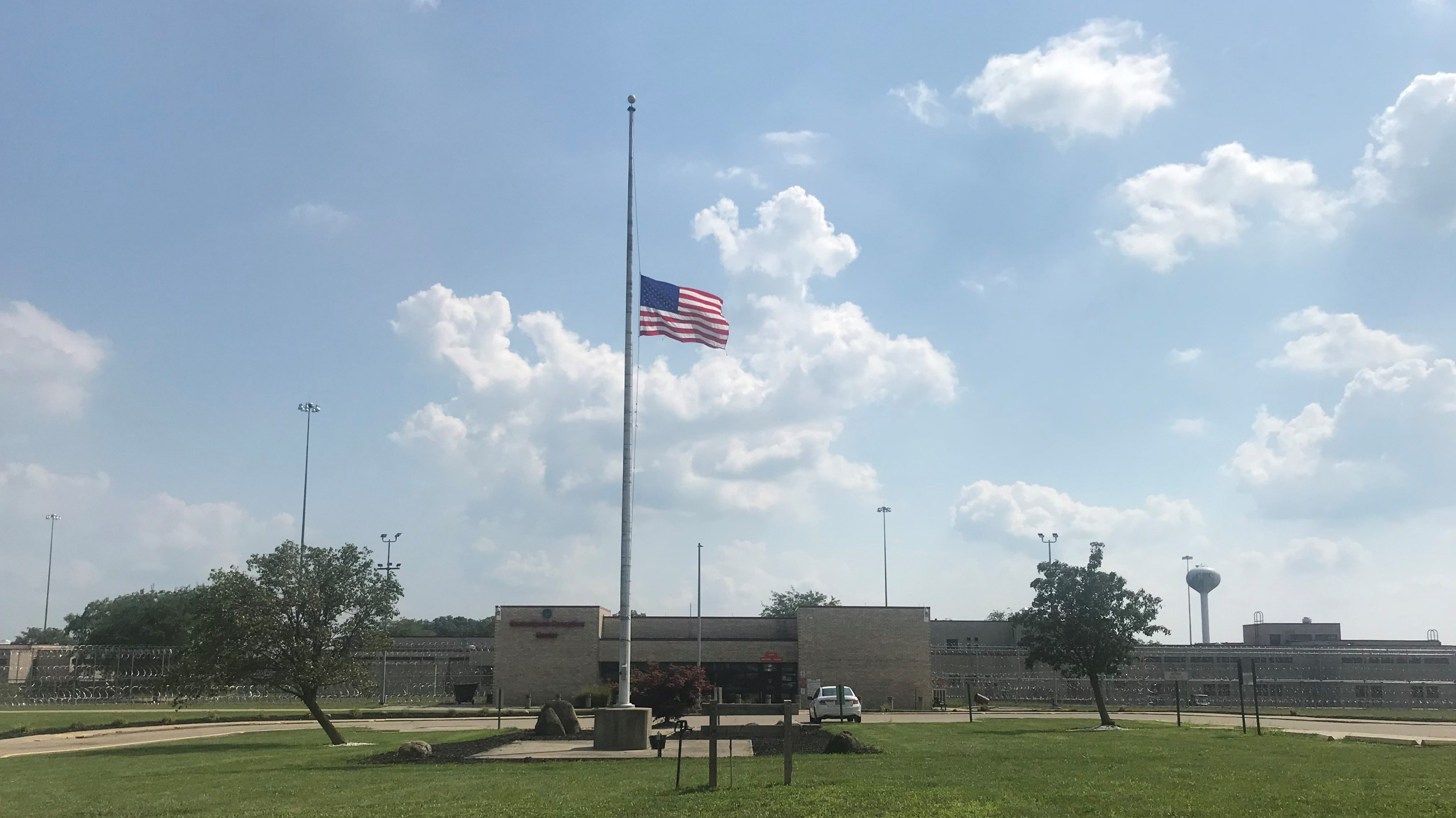
- Interactive map of Correctional Reception Center
- Location: 11271 Ohio 762 Orient, Ohio
- Status: Open
- Security class: Mixed males
- Capacity: 1,562
- Population: 1,557 (February 4, 2024)
- Opened: 1987
- Managed by: Ohio Department of Rehabilitation and Correction
- Director: Edward H. Banks III (Interim)
- Warden: Jody Sparks
- Website: https://drc.ohio.gov/about/facilities/correctional-reception-center

The Correctional Reception Center is a state prison for men located in Orient, Pickaway County, Ohio, opened in 1987, owned and operated by the Ohio Department of Rehabilitation and Correction.

The facility holds a maximum of 1,562 inmates at various security levels with a population of 1,557 as of February 4, 2024. The prison is immediately adjacent to the state's Pickaway Correctional Institution. It is also the reception center for most male inmates in Ohio except those from Stark, Summit, and Cuyahoga counties.

== Notable Inmates ==
Inmate Name	Register Number	Status	Details
George Washington Wagner IV	A808476	Serving life sentence.	One of the perpetrators of the 2016 Pike County shootings.
Ariel Castro	A643371	Sentenced to life without parole, died by suicide in September 2013.	Abducted Michelle Knight, Amanda Berry, and Gina DeJesus from 2002 to 2013 in Cleveland.
Chad Doerman	A835208	Serving life sentence.	Shot and killed his three sons: Chase, 3; Hunter, 4; and Clayton, 7 in Clermont County.

*The number is not reported using the Offender Search through the ODRC website.
