= Doerman family murders =

2023 familicide in Ohio, U.S.

- Monroe Township (Ohio)
- Location: 38°56′50″N 84°11′25″W; Monroe Township, Clermont County, Ohio, U.S.
- Date: June 15, 2023; 3 years ago
- Attack type: Triple-filicide by shooting
- Weapon: .22-caliber Marlin Model 70HC semi-automatic rifle
- Deaths: 3
- Injuries: 1
- Victims: Clayton Doerman (7); Hunter Doerman (4); Chase Doerman (3)
- Perpetrator: Chad Doerman
- Verdict: Pleaded guilty
- Convictions: Aggravated murder (3 counts), felonious assault (2 counts)
- Sentence: Three consecutive life sentences without the possibility of parole

On June 15, 2023, in Monroe Township, Clermont County, Ohio, United States, Clayton, Hunter, and Chase Doerman (ages seven, four and three respectively) were shot and killed at their home. The 34-year-old wife of the perpetrator was injured in the attack, and her daughter (the perpetrator's stepdaughter) was held at gunpoint but escaped.

Police arrived and arrested 32-year-old Chad Doerman, the father of the three victims, and charged him with murder, felonious assault, and kidnapping. Doerman pleaded not guilty on June 23.

On August 2, 2024, Doerman pleaded guilty to three counts of aggravated murder and two counts of felonious assault as part of a plea agreement that allowed him to avoid the death penalty. He was sentenced to three consecutive life sentences without the possibility of parole.

== Events ==
According to the bill of particulars, on June 15, 2023, Chad Doerman returned home early from work and requested his three sons, Clayton, Hunter, and Chase, and his wife, Laura, join him in the primary bedroom for a nap. Sometime after they had laid down on the bed, Doerman opened his gun safe and retrieved a Marlin Model 70HC .22 rifle. Doerman shot Hunter twice, killing him. Laura began trying to help Hunter while telling the other two sons to run.

The 14-year-old stepdaughter, Alexis, who had been watching television, had entered the bedroom and witnessed the first shots. She ran after Clayton, telling him to keep running. Doerman chased him into a nearby field, shot him from behind, and then again point-blank in the head. Doerman carried Clayton's body back to the house's yard.

Alexis reentered the house, picked up Chase, and escaped to the road. Doerman followed her and aimed the rifle at her, telling her to put Chase down. He tried to fire but was out of ammunition. Chase ran to his mother, who was now outside in the yard trying to render aid to Clayton. Alexis got away and informed a passerby what her stepfather was doing before continuing to run towards the nearby Monroe Township Fire Department.

Doerman went inside and carried Hunter's body outside, laying him in the yard. He tried to wrestle Chase from Laura, reportedly biting her in the process. When she managed to grab the rifle, Doerman fired, shooting Laura in the thumb. She dropped Chase, whom Doerman then shot in the head. In total, he had discharged the rifle 9 times. Doerman laid Chase's body down next to his brothers and sat on the side stoop of the house, watching as Laura tried to resuscitate the boys, until police arrived at 4:25 p.m.

Upon their arrival, the police instructed Doerman to show his hands and walk towards them, but Doerman disobeyed and remained sitting. Subsequently, officers approached him and took him into custody at 4:27 p.m.

== Victims ==
Three children were killed in the incident: Clayton, Hunter and Chase. It was determined that Chase was shot once while the other two were shot four times. The children's mother was wounded with a gunshot wound to the hand, and transported to the hospital for treatment.

== Aftermath ==
Shortly after the shooting, a crisis team was stationed at Monroe Elementary School for those who needed aid. This was the second killing in recent months; in February 2023, another student and his parents were killed in a murder suicide. Two separate GoFundMe campaigns were created to help Alexis and Laura.

== Legal proceedings ==
Doerman reportedly admitted in an interview he had been planning since October 2022 to shoot his sons.

He was charged with nine counts of aggravated murder, one for each gunshot that hit the deceased. In addition, he received eight kidnapping charges and four felonious assault charges. His first court appearance was on June 16. He pleaded not guilty at his arraignment on June 23, which he later changed his plea to not guilty by reason of insanity in March 2024. Prior to Doerman pleading guilty and being sentenced to life imprisonment, prosecutor Mark Tekulve sought the death penalty. Doerman's trial was set to begin in July 2024, but was delayed. On August 2, 2024, Doerman pleaded guilty in exchange for three life sentences without parole.

An attorney for the prosecution read statements by both Doerman's wife and his stepdaughter. The stepdaughter's statement read, in part:

[Y]ou gave me an amazing life and I will forever be grateful for the memories and time you spent with me.... I don't think I will ever be able to hate you.... I will forever hold onto the memories I had with you and the boys because those are all happy memories and those were the best times.... [Y]ou were the best dad I could have ever asked for.... I will never in a million years ever forgive you for what you have done and hope you pay for your actions like you deserve. But I will never hate you.

== Perpetrator ==
Court records show Chad Doerman (born March 1, 1991) had one criminal offense from a domestic violence charge prior to the shootings, as well as some traffic violations. The domestic abuse case was ultimately dropped after the alleged victim, Doerman's father, failed to appear as a prosecution witness in the case. A neighbor who saw the aftermath of the shooting indicated they had witnessed Doerman treating his family poorly and that he was angry every day.

On August 7, 2024, Doerman was incarcerated at the Correctional Reception Center in Orient, Ohio.
