= Private Down Under =

2012 Private series book by James Patterson

- First edition (original name)
- Author: James Patterson & Michael White
- Language: English
- Series: Private
- Genre: Thriller novel
- Publisher: Random House Australia
- Publication date: 2012
- Publication place: United States
- Media type: Print (hardcover)
- Pages: 384 pp (first edition, hardcover)
- Preceded by: Private L.A. (2013)
- Followed by: Private India: City on Fire (2014)

Private Down Under is the seventh book of Patterson's Private series. This novel was written by Patterson and Michael White and was first published in 2012 by Random House Australia under the title Private Oz.

== Plot ==
In previous Private novels, James Patterson billed Private as the world's most exclusive detective agency. Private opens a new office in Sydney, Australia. A party is thrown as the business opens, but no celebrations take place. As soon as a toast is made, a young Asian man staggers into the party and dies. This immediately gets Private into an investigation of organized crime.

Within days Private is called to investigate what turns into a series of grisly murders in the wealthy Eastern Suburbs of Sydney. Added to that a famous rock star walks into the Private offices and says he needs protection, as someone wants to kill him. The staff of Private is busy in the rest of the book making headway on all these cases.

== Reviews ==
This book is noted in several publications. The Belfast Telegraph said this book was reported as widely read in Northern Ireland's libraries. In September 2014 Private Down Under one week was listed third on the New York Times Best Seller list for combined print and e-book fiction. Book Reporter provided a positive review of the book, saying, "One can only hope that Patterson and White will revisit the offices of Private Sydney in short order."
