= Mary Jordan (journalist) =

American journalist, Pulitzer Prize winner

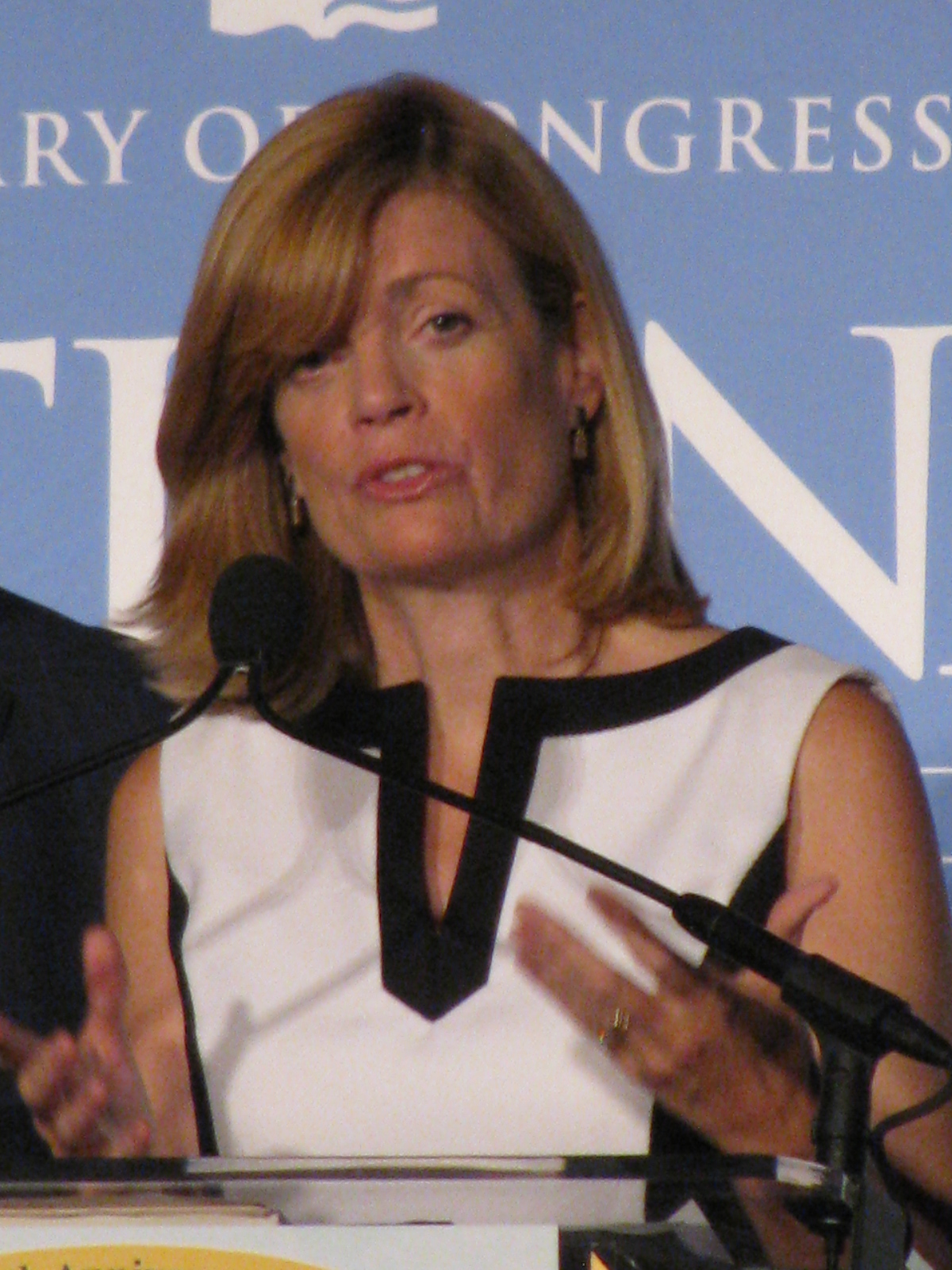
- Jordan at the 2015 National Book Festival
- Born: November 10, 1960 (age 65); Cleveland
- Education: Saint Joseph Academy
- Alma mater: Georgetown University; Columbia University; Trinity College Dublin; Harvard University
- Occupation: Journalist
- Writing career
- Genre: non-fiction
- Notable awards: Pulitzer Prize for International Reporting (2003)

Mary Catherine Jordan (born November 10, 1960) is an American journalist and author who is Associate Editor at The Washington Post. She was a foreign correspondent for 14 years. With her husband, Kevin Sullivan, Jordan ran the newspaper's bureaus in Tokyo, Mexico City and London. Jordan also was the founding editor and head of content for Washington Post Live. In 2003, she received the Pulitzer Prize for International Reporting along with her husband.

Jordan wrote the 2020 book, The Art of Her Deal, an unauthorized biography of Melania Trump. With Sullivan, she also wrote Hope: A Memoir of Survival in Cleveland in 2015. Hope was written with Amanda Berry and Gina DeJesus, two of the women who were kidnapped and held for a decade in Cleveland, Jordan's hometown. Jordan interviews people for the What It Takes podcast created by the Academy of Achievement.

== Early life and education ==
Jordan, a daughter of Irish immigrants, was born and raised in Cleveland, Ohio. She attended Saint Joseph Academy in Cleveland, Ohio, graduating in 1979. She graduated from Georgetown University in 1983 and earned a master's degree from the Columbia University Graduate School of Journalism in 1984. She also studied in year-long stints at Trinity College, Dublin (Irish history and the poetry of W. B. Yeats). In 1989–90, Jordan was awarded a Nieman Fellowship by Harvard University.

== Career ==
Jordan was given her first job in the newspaper business by Irish author and editor Tim Pat Coogan, who hired her to write a column in The Irish Press.

As a national correspondent for the Post, Jordan has written about U.S. politics and society and has appeared as an analyst on ABC, and BBC. Jordan was the founding editor and moderator for Washington Post Live, which hosted forums including "The 40th Anniversary of Watergate" in June 2012 that featured key Watergate figures including former White House Counsel John Dean, The Washington Post editor Ben Bradlee, and reporters Bob Woodward and Carl Bernstein.

Jordan has interviewed newsmakers including singer and songwriter Paul McCartney, Colombian novelist Gabriel García Márquez, British Prime Minister Tony Blair, and Benjamín Arellano Félix, one of Mexico's most notorious drug kingpins. She has written about injustices and discrimination against women including the exceedingly low conviction rate of rape in Britain and the many girls in India denied schooling solely because they were not born male.

Jordan and Sullivan authored The Prison Angel: Mother Antonia's Journey from Beverly Hills to a Life of Service in a Mexican Jail (The Penguin Press, 2005). In 2006, the book won the Christopher Award, which "salutes media that affirm the highest values of the human spirit."

Together with Amanda Berry and Gina DeJesus, two of the women kidnapped and held for nearly a decade by Ariel Castro in Cleveland, Jordan and Sullivan wrote the bestselling book Hope: A Memoir of Survival in Cleveland (Viking, 2015).

Jordan was part of the team that reported Trump Revealed: An American Journey of Ambition, Ego, Money, and Power, a biography of Donald Trump published by Scribner in 2016. Jordan was a contributing writer to Nine Irish Lives: The Thinkers, Fighters and Artists Who Helped Build America, edited by Mark Bailey and published by Algonquin Books in 2018.

Jordan and Sullivan are the authors of Trump on Trial: The Investigation, Impeachment, Acquittal and Aftermath (Scribner, 2020). The book, with reporting contributions from Washington Post colleagues, received a "starred" review by Kirkus, which said it "sets a standard for political storytelling with impeccable research and lively writing." The paperback was updated to include the second Trump impeachment and was published in 2021 as Trump's Trials.

== Awards and recognition ==
Jordan and Sullivan won the 2003 Pulitzer Prize for International Reporting for their Post series on the "horrific conditions in Mexico's criminal justice system and how they affect the daily lives of people." Along with four Post photographers, Jordan and Sullivan were finalists for the 2009 Pulitzer Prize for International Reporting for their series of stories on the difficulties women face around the world.

Jordan has also won the George Polk Award for Economic Reporting (in 1998), and accolades from the Overseas Press Club of America and the Society of Professional Journalists.

In 2016, Jordan was the winner of The Washington Post's Eugene Meyer Award for her contributions to the paper.

== Works ==
=== Books ===
- ——; Sullivan, Kevin (2005). The Prison Angel: Mother Antonia's Life of Service in a Mexican Jail (hardcover 1st ed.). New York: Penguin Publishing Group. ISBN 9781594200564.
- ——; Amanda Berry; Gina DeJesus; Kevin Sullivan (2015). Hope: A Memoir of Survival in Cleveland (hardcover 1st ed.). New York: Viking Books. ISBN 9780525427650.
- —— (2020). The Art of Her Deal: The Untold Story of Melania Trump (hardcover 1st ed.). New York: Simon & Schuster. ISBN 9781982113407.
- ——; Sullivan, Kevin (2020). Trump on Trial: The Investigation, Impeachment, Acquittal and Aftermath (hardcover 1st ed.). New York: Scribner. ISBN 9781982152994.
- ——; Sullivan, Kevin (2020). Trump's Trials: One Started with a Phone Call. The Other with a Deadly Riot. Here Is the Story (paperback ed.). New York: Scribner. ISBN 9781982153007.

=== Anthology appearances ===
- ——; Sullivan, Kevin (2018). "The Peacemaker: Niall O'Dowd". In Mark Bailey (ed.). Nine Irish Lives: The Thinkers, Fighters and Artists Who Helped Build America. Algonquin Books. ISBN 9781616205171.

=== Selected works from 2003 Pulitzer Prize-winning stories ===
- Disparate Justice Imprisons Mexico's Poor
- In Mexico, an Unpunished Crime
- Mexico's Children Suffer in "Little Jails"
- Convicts are Condemned to a Paradise in Mexico

=== Selected works from Pulitzer Prize-finalist series on the difficulties facing women ===
- 'This is the Destiny of Girls'
- In Affluent Germany, Women Still Confront Traditional Bias
- In Britain, Rape Cases Seldom Result in a Conviction

=== Poynter Institute interview with Sullivan and Jordan ===
- Shoulder to Shoulder: The Art and Chaos of Collaboration
