= Private Games =

Book by James Patterson

- First edition (US)
- Author: James Patterson & Mark T. Sullivan
- Language: English
- Series: Private London series
- Genre: Thriller novel
- Publisher: Little, Brown and Company
- Publication date: January 1, 2012
- Publication place: United States
- Media type: Print (hardcover)
- Pages: 409 pp (first edition, hardcover)
- ISBN: 978-1-84605-973-5 (for first hardcover edition)
- Preceded by: Private London (2011)

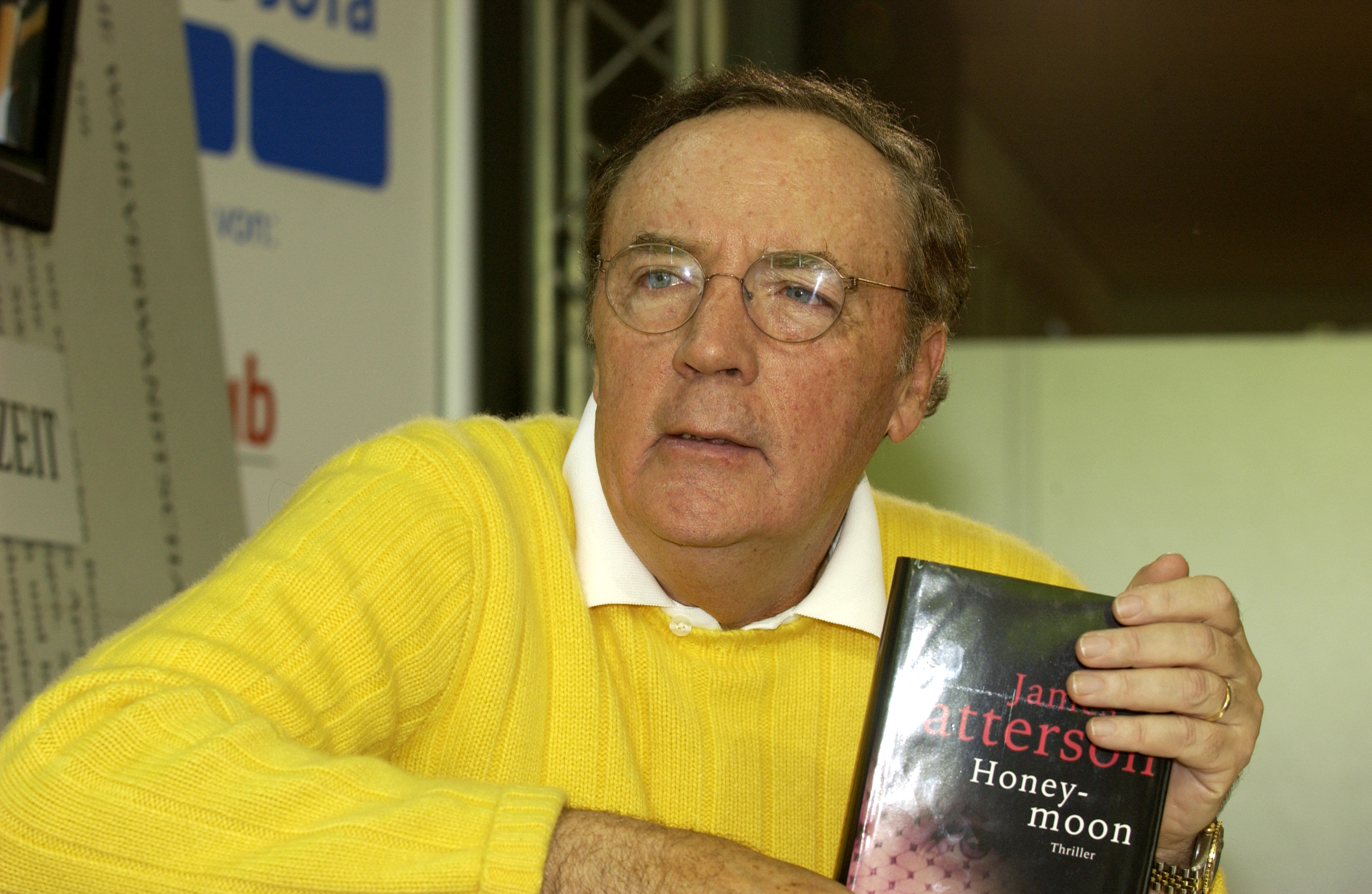
James Patterson

Private Games, written by James Patterson and Mark Sullivan, is the second book of the Private London series. The Private London series is itself a spin-off of the Private series. This book was first published on January 1, 2012, by Little, Brown and Company.

== Plot ==
This book is a thriller novel set just before and during the 2012 London Olympics. Peter Knight is an investigator for Private London, a subsidiary of Private, a private investigative agency led by Jack Morgan in the United States. Private London has been commissioned to provide security for the London Olympics. Private London has been thrown into some disarray, because a number of its personnel were killed in an airplane crash just before the Olympics began.

Just before the Olympics begin, someone beheads Knight's mother's fiancé. The slain man is a member of the Olympic games organizing committee. After the murder, Karen Pope, a reporter for The Sun, receives a letter from a person who calls himself Cronus. Cronus claims he will kill persons involved with the Olympics who he considers corrupt. Cronus does just that, even infiltrating Olympics security and Knight's home. Throughout the novel, Cronus and his underlings kill those considered corrupt and anyone who gets in their way. Near the end of the book, Private Games takes an unexpected twist.
