= Cleveland Abduction =

2015 American crime drama TV film

- Genre: Thriller
- Based on: Finding Me: A Decade of Darkness, a Life Reclaimed by Michelle Knight
- Written by: Stephen Tolkin
- Directed by: Alex Kalymnios
- Starring: Taryn Manning; Raymond Cruz; Joe Morton
- Music by: Tony Morales
- Country of origin: United States
- Original language: English

Production
- Producers: David A. Rosemont; Stephen Tolkin
- Cinematography: Richard Wong
- Editor: Henk Van Eeghen
- Running time: 88 minutes
- Production company: Sony Pictures Television

Original release
- Network: Lifetime
- Release: May 2, 2015

Cleveland Abduction is a 2015 American crime drama television film directed by Alex Kalymnios from a teleplay written by Stephen Tolkin. Based on the kidnapping of three Cleveland women by Ariel Castro in the early 2000s, the film stars Taryn Manning, Raymond Cruz and Joe Morton. It debuted May 2, 2015 on Lifetime.

The film is based on the memoir, Finding Me: A Decade of Darkness, a Life Reclaimed by Michelle Knight.

== Plot ==
In August 2002 in Cleveland, Ohio, 21-year-old single mother Michelle Knight has lost custody of her son, Joey. One morning while walking to court, she accepts a ride from Ariel Castro who abducts her and holds her captive in his home, regularly beating and raping her.

After several months, Castro buys Michelle a puppy for company but kills it when she tries to escape, leaving her devastated. Michelle also discovers she is pregnant but Castro causes her to have a miscarriage by hitting her with a dumbbell. Finding strength through her belief in God and determined to be reunited with her son, she refuses to be broken down and always remains hopeful that she will be found, despite no active investigation as police believe she had ran away.

In April 2003, Castro abducts and brings home Amanda Berry, and later in April 2004, he does the same with Georgina "Gina" DeJesus. The three young women become friends, treating one another as sisters throughout their time in captivity. When Amanda becomes pregnant, Michelle delivers the baby, a girl, performing CPR on her under the threat of Castro killing her if the child does not survive. They name her Jocelyn and she grows up brainwashed into thinking their way of living is normal, believing Michelle and Gina are her aunts.

In 2013 after enduring more than a decade of brutality and captivity, Amanda succeeds in escaping from the house when Castro fails to lock the front door. She and Jocelyn alert their neighbours and they phone the police, releasing all four women. After recovering in hospital, Michelle learns Joey was adopted not long after she was reported missing; his new family decline any interaction and she comes to accept this, knowing Joey is happy and taken care of.

Michelle, Amanda and Gina part ways, forever bonded by their experience, but hopeful for the future ahead. Castro is sentenced to life imprisonment plus 1,000 years, without any possibility of parole. However, just a month after his sentencing, he is found dead in his cell from suicide by hanging.

== Cast ==
- Taryn Manning as Michelle Knight
- Raymond Cruz as Ariel Castro
- Katie Sarife as Gina DeJesus
- Samantha Droke as Amanda Berry
- Pam Grier as Carla
- Joe Morton as Agent Solano
- Kyle McCann as Joey Knight

== See also ==
- Ariel Castro kidnappings - the case on which the book this movie was based on, was itself based on.
