= Private Paris =

- First edition
- Author: James Patterson and Mark Sullivan
- Language: English
- Series: Private series
- Genre: Adventure novel
- Publisher: Little, Brown and Company
- Publication date: March 14, 2016
- Publication place: United States
- Media type: Print (hardcover)
- Pages: 448 pp (first edition, hardcover)
- ISBN: 0316407054
- Preceded by: Private India: City on Fire (2014)
- Followed by: Private: Missing (2016)

Private Paris is the tenth novel in the Private series.

== Plot ==
When Jack Morgan, the owner of Private, visits his office in Paris, he hopes to have a relaxing time of enjoying the sights and having fine food and wine. His trip ends up being anything but relaxing. First, a client from California calls to ask Jack to find a granddaughter missing in Paris and to return her home. This venture becomes very complicated. Next, France's elite are being killed one by one and the killings appear to be religiously and ethnically motivated.

== Reviews ==
A review in book reporter was positive. The review said, "PRIVATE PARIS is not high literary art; not everything needs to be. Instead it’s a heck of an entertaining story that moves readers rapidly from page to page while also providing a bit of a triptych tour of Paris and its culture." The New York Times had a review that mentioned Private Paris without really saying much about the book.
