= Kevin Sullivan (journalist) =

American journalist & author (born 1959)

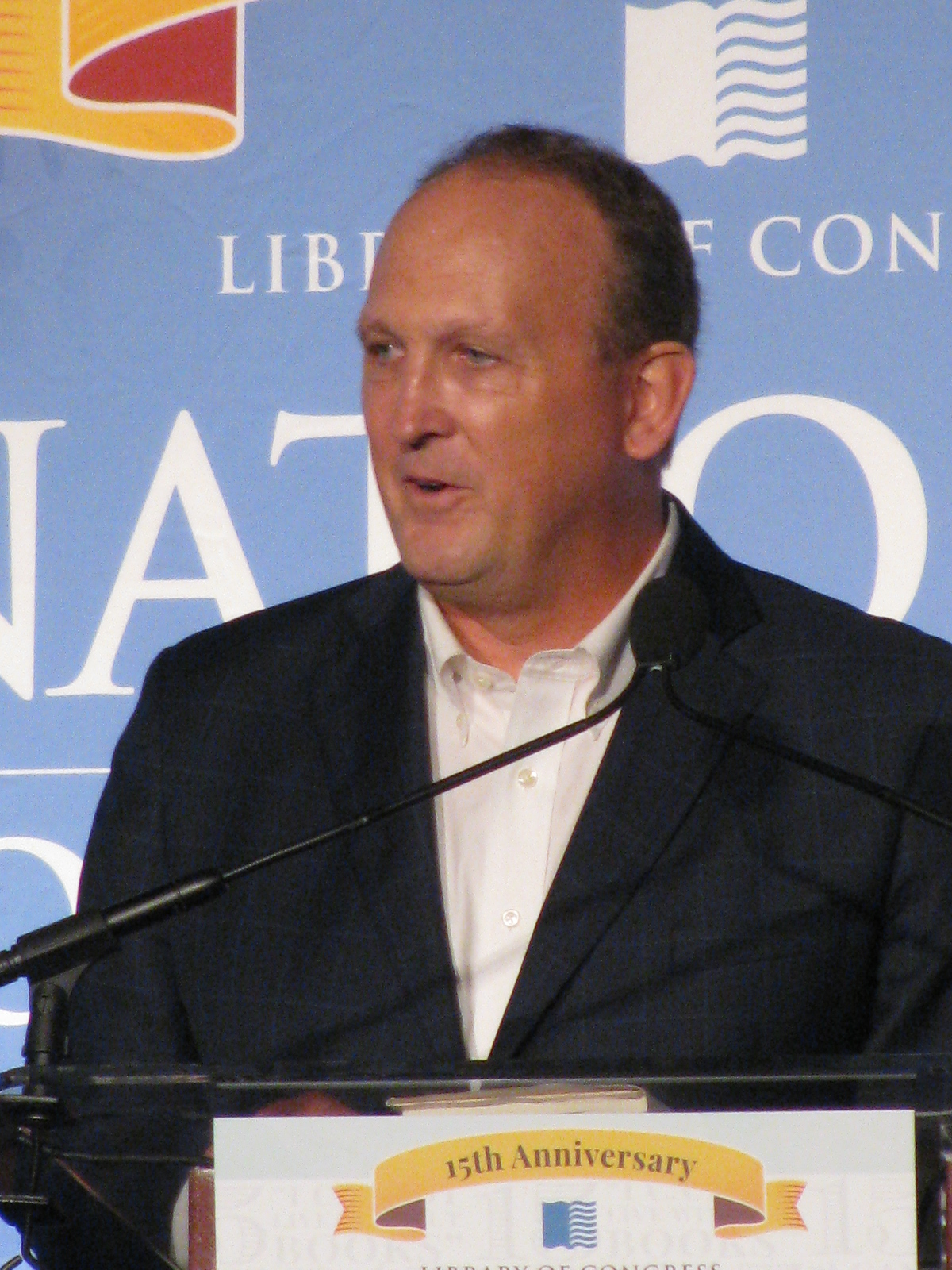
- Born: November 5, 1959 (age 66)
- Education: University of New Hampshire
- Occupation: journalist
- Writing career
- Genre: non-fiction

Kevin Sullivan (born November 5, 1959) is an American journalist and author who is an associate editor at The Washington Post. Sullivan was a Post foreign correspondent for 14 years, working with his wife, Mary Jordan, as the newspaper's co-bureau chiefs in Tokyo, Mexico City and London. Sullivan is known for parachuting into faraway places, from Congo to Burma to Baghdad. He went to Afghanistan after the September 11, 2001 terrorist attacks and to Saudi Arabia when King Abdullah died, and again after Jamal Khashoggi was murdered. He has also worked as the Post's chief foreign correspondent, deputy foreign editor, and Sunday and Features Editor.

Sullivan and Jordan wrote three books together. Trump on Trial chronicled the Trump impeachment, and Hope: A Memoir of Survival in Cleveland was written with kidnapping survivors with Amanda Berry and Gina DeJesus. Sullivan and Jordan have also been featured authors at the Library of Congress National Book Festival in Washington, D.C.

== Early life and education ==
Sullivan was raised in Brunswick, Maine and graduated from the University of New Hampshire in 1981. After working for The Providence Journal in Rhode Island and the Gloucester Daily Times in Massachusetts, Sullivan joined the Post in 1991.

Sullivan spent a year studying Japanese language and East Asian affairs at Georgetown University in 1994–95, and he studied Spanish and Latin American affairs as a John S. Knight Fellow at Stanford University from 1999 to 2000.

== Career ==
Sullivan and Jordan wrote The Prison Angel: Mother Antonia's Journey from Beverly Hills to a Life of Service in a Mexican Jail. The book was given the Christopher Award in 2006.

They also co-authored with Amanda Berry and Gina DeJesus, two of the women kidnapped and held for nearly a decade by Ariel Castro in Cleveland—of Hope: A Memoir of Survival in Cleveland, published by Viking in April 2015. Sullivan also contributed a chapter to Trump Revealed: An American Journey of Ambition, Ego, Money, and Power, a Washington Post biography of then-candidate Donald Trump published by Scribner in 2016.

Sullivan and Jordan contributed a chapter to Nine Irish Lives: The Thinkers, Fighters and Artists Who Helped Build America, edited by Mark Bailey and published by Algonquin Books in 2018. Sullivan and Jordan are the authors of Trump on Trial: The Investigation, Impeachment, Acquittal and Aftermath, published by Scribner in August 2020. The book, with reporting contributions from Washington Post colleagues, was given a “starred” review by Kirkus.

== Awards ==
Sullivan and Jordan won the 2003 Pulitzer Prize for International Reporting for a series of stories about the Mexican criminal justice system. They were also finalists for the 2009 Pulitzer Prize for International Reporting, along with four Post photographers, for a series of stories on difficulties facing women around the world.

Sullivan was also part of a Post team that was a finalist for the 2019 Pulitzer Prize for Public Service. Reporting from Saudi Arabia, Sullivan contributed to what the Pulitzer board called the Post's “commanding and courageous” coverage of the October 2018 murder of Saudi-born journalist Jamal Khashoggi.

Sullivan and Jordan, with Post colleague Keith Richburg, also won the 1998 George Polk Award for their reporting on the 1997 Asian financial crisis. Sullivan and Jordan have also won awards from the Overseas Press Club of America and the Society of Professional Journalists.

== Works ==
=== Bibliography ===
- Mary Jordan; Kevin Sullivan (5 May 2005). The Prison Angel: Mother Antonia's Journey from Beverly Hills to a Life of Service in a Mexican Jail. Penguin Press. ISBN 978-1594200564
- Amanda Berry; Gina DeJesus; Mary Jordan; Kevin Sullivan (27 April 2015). Hope: A Memoir of Survival in Cleveland. Viking Press. ISBN 978-0698178953
- Kevin Sullivan; Mary Jordan (25 August 2020). Trump on Trial: The Investigation, Impeachment, Acquittal and Aftermath. Scribner. ISBN 978-1-9821-5299-4.

=== Selected works from 2003 Pulitzer Prize-winning stories ===
- In Mexico Hinterland, Life Beyond the Law
- Torture, A Ghost in Mexico's Closet
- Disparate Justice Imprisons Mexico's Poor
- Kidnapping is Growth Industry in Mexico

=== Selected works from 2009 Pulitzer Prize-finalist series on the difficulties facing women ===
- A Mother's Final Look at Life
- In Sierra Leone, Every Pregnancy Is a 'Chance of Dying'
- Africa's Last and Leas
- In Africa, One Family's Struggle With the Global Food Crisis

=== Selected works from 2019 Pulitzer Prize-finalist series on the Jamal Khashoggi murder ===
- Crown Prince Mohammed bin Salman is ‘chief of the tribe’ in a cowed House of Saud
