= Finding Me: A Decade of Darkness, a Life Reclaimed =

2014 biographical memoir by American kidnapping survivor Michelle Knight

- Author: Michelle Knight
- Audio read by: Michelle Knight (herself)
- Language: English
- Subject: Story of the kidnappings of three Cleveland women by Ariel Castro in the early 2000s
- Genre: Biography
- Publisher: Weinstein
- Publication date: May 6, 2014
- Publication place: United States
- Media type: Print
- Pages: 280
- ISBN: 978-1-602-86279-1

Finding Me: A Decade of Darkness, a Life Reclaimed is a 2014 biographical memoir by American kidnapping survivor Michelle Knight and contributed by Michelle Burford. Knight's memoir tells the story of her tumultuous childhood in Cleveland, her estrangement from her family, and her fight for custody for her son, as well as being abducted, raped, tortured and kept into captivity for over a decade at the hands of her kidnapper, Ariel Castro.

Finding Me debuted on May 6, 2014, one year after Knight was rescued from captivity with fellow survivors Amanda Berry and Gina DeJesus. The book reached the number two spot on the New York Times Bestseller List and was named to the top 20 best biographies and memoirs list by Amazon.com in 2014. Knight's book was later served as the outline for the Lifetime network film Cleveland Abduction.
