= Mark T. Sullivan =

American author (born 1958)

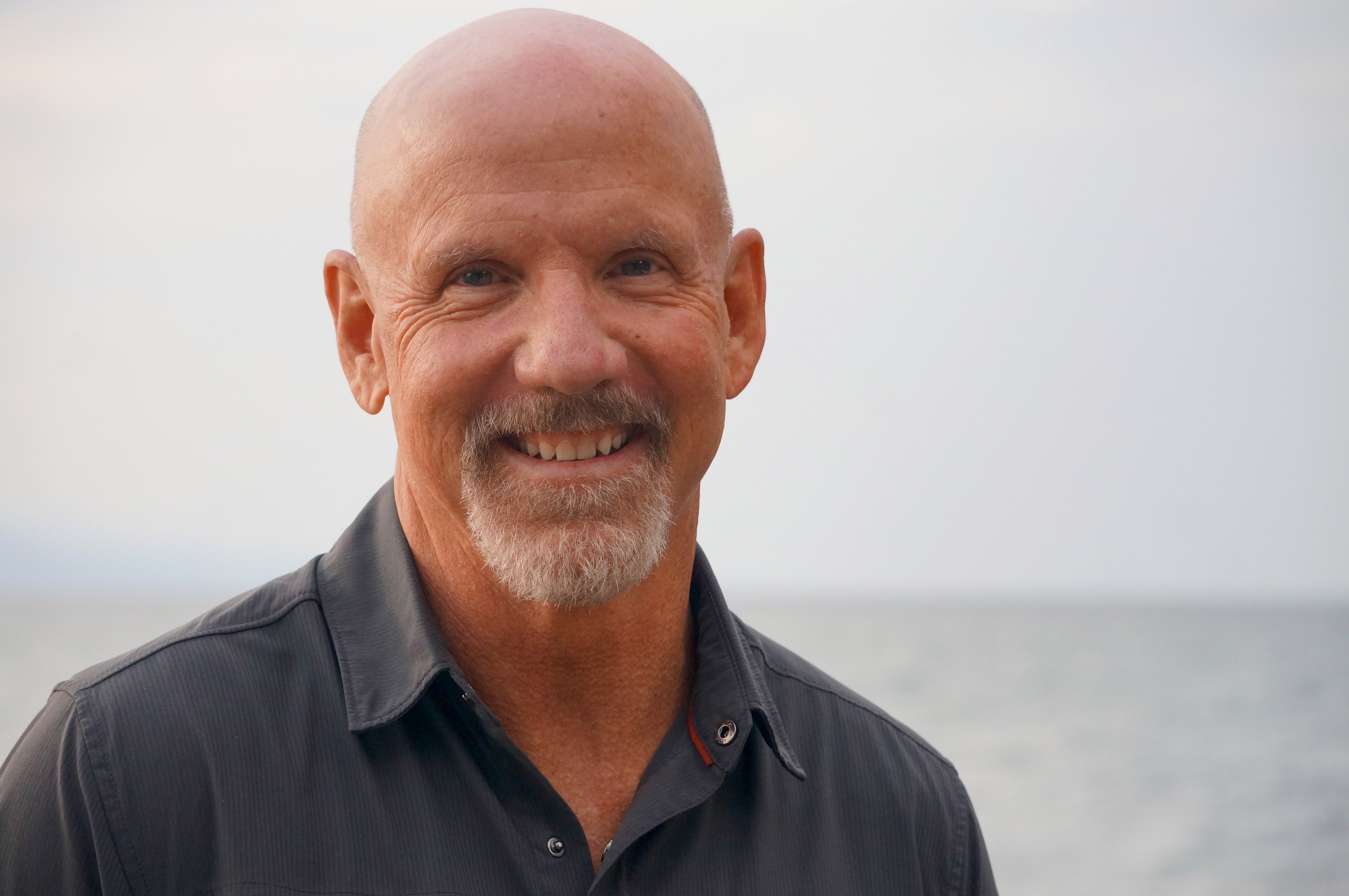
Author Mark T. Sullivan

Mark T. Sullivan (born 1958) is an American author who writes mystery, suspense and historical fiction novels. His fourteen published works that are written solely by him include The Fall Line, The Purification Ceremony, Triple Cross, Rogue and the USA Today and Washington Post bestselling novel, Beneath a Scarlet Sky. He has also written, as of June 2016, five novels with James Patterson.

== Biography and career ==
Sullivan was born and raised in Medfield, Massachusetts, a suburb of Boston. He earned a BA in English from Hamilton College in 1980. After graduating, he served as a volunteer in the Peace Corps, teaching English to children of Tuareg nomads in the Sahara Desert.

Sullivan returned to the United States in 1982 and studied at the Medill School of Journalism of Northwestern University in Evanston, Illinois.

He began writing fiction at 30, and his first novel, The Fall Line (1994), was a New York Times Notable Book of the Year.

His 2017 novel, Beneath a Scarlet Sky, was optioned in 2017 by Pascal Pictures with actor Tom Holland attached to star in the lead role.

== Published works ==
- The Fall Line (1994), ISBN 978-0-7860-0176-7
- Hard News (1995), ISBN 978-0786003228
- The Purification Ceremony (1996), ISBN 978-0-380-79042-5
- Ghost Dance (1995), ISBN 978-0-380-79043-2
- Labyrinth (2001), ISBN 0-7434-3980-5
- The Serpent's Kiss (2003), ISBN 978-0-7434-3982-4
- Triple Cross (2009), ISBN 978-0-312-37850-9
- Rogue (October 2012, ebook 2011), ISBN 978-0312378516
- Private Games (January 2012) ISBN 0316206822 (written with James Patterson)
- Private Berlin (January 2013) ISBN 0316211176 (written with Patterson)
- Outlaw (October 2013) ISBN 978-1-250-02361-2
- Private L.A. (February 2014) ISBN 0-316-21112-5 (written with Patterson)
- Thief (December 2014) ISBN 978-1-250-05231-5
- Private Paris (March 2016) ISBN 978-0316407052 (written with Patterson)
- The Games: A Private Novel (June 2016) ISBN 978-0316407113 (written with Patterson)
- The Second Woman (2017) ISBN 978-1521301296
- Beneath a Scarlet Sky (2017), ISBN 978-1-503-94337-7
- The Last Green Valley (2021), ISBN 978-1503958760
- All The Glimmering Stars (2024), ISBN 978-1542038126
