= Festive in Death =

2014 novel by J. D. Robb

- First edition
- Author: J.D. Robb (Nora Roberts)
- Language: English
- Genre: Mystery
- Publisher: Putnam
- Publication date: 2014
- Publication place: United States

Festive in Death is the 39th book written by Nora Roberts under the pseudonym of J.D Robb.

== Plot summary ==
Eve Dallas is a homicide detective who investigates a list of women who were romanced by a murdered personal trainer during the pre-Christmas party season.
