= Private L.A. =

- First edition
- Author: James Patterson & Mark T. Sullivan
- Language: English
- Series: Jack Morgan Series
- Genre: Thriller novel
- Publisher: Little, Brown and Co.
- Publication date: February 10, 2014
- Publication place: United States
- Media type: Print (hardcover)
- Pages: 448 pp (first edition, hardcover)
- ISBN: 0-316-21112-5 (for first hardcover edition)
- Preceded by: Private: Number 1 Suspect
- Followed by: Private Down Under

Private L.A. is the third book of the Jack Morgan series. The Goodreads website considers this the seventh book of the series, as four spin-off novels have been written about Private operations in other locations. This novel was written by James Patterson and Mark T. Sullivan. It appears more books in this series are to follow.

== Plot ==
This book has several plots. Most directly involve Jack Morgan, the owner of Private, a private investigation company started by his father. One plot involves the disappearance of a Hollywood acting couple and their three adopted children. While investigating their disappearance, Justine Smith, Morgan's friend and employee, faces death in one situation. This experience changes her perception of herself and she has to sort her emotions out that result from this. Another plot involves the legal problems of Jack's brother Tommy. Tommy seeks to bring Jack down with himself and Jack has to find a way to steer clear of his brother's problems. Another plot involves Private in a case where a killer or group of killers, known as No Prisoners, is randomly targeting people in public places and killing them to extort money in exchange for ceasing the killings.

== Reviews ==
This book received some acclaim. It appeared on the USA Today bestseller list for at least 13 weeks and was at one point the top book on this list. The Bookreporter website has a very favorable review of this book. The review says, "There is plenty to enjoy here, with no question that Patterson’s regular and occasional readers, as well as those reading his work for the first time, will be fully satisfied."
