= Ariel Castro kidnappings =

2002–2004 kidnappings in Cleveland, Ohio, US

- From left to right: Amanda Berry, Gina DeJesus, and Michelle Knight
- Location: 41°28′21″N 81°41′53″W; 2207 Seymour Avenue, Tremont, Cleveland, Ohio, U.S.
- Date: August 23, 2002 to May 6, 2013
- Attack type: Kidnapping, rape, aggravated murder, attempted murder, assault
- Victims: Michelle Knight; Amanda Berry; Gina DeJesus
- Perpetrator: Ariel Castro
- Convicted: Ariel Castro

Between 2002 and 2004, Ariel Castro abducted Michelle Knight, Amanda Berry, and Gina DeJesus from the roads of Cleveland, Ohio, United States, and later held them captive in his home at 2207 Seymour Avenue in the city's Tremont neighborhood. All three young women were imprisoned at Castro's home until 2013, when Berry successfully escaped with her six-year-old daughter, to whom she had given birth while captive. Neighbors helped Amanda Berry escape from a Cleveland house on May 6, 2013, after she cried for help from a locked door. Neighbors Charles Ramsey and Angel Cordero assisted her and her young daughter in breaking through the door, and Ramsey provided a phone to call 911. Police arrested Castro a few hours later.

Castro was charged with four counts of kidnapping and three counts of rape. He pleaded guilty to 937 criminal counts of rape, kidnapping, and aggravated murder as part of a plea bargain. He was sentenced to life imprisonment plus 1,000 years in prison without the possibility of parole. One month into his life sentence, Castro died by suicide by hanging himself with bedsheets in his prison cell.

== Kidnapper background ==
Ariel Castro in 2001

Ariel Castro (July 10, 1960 – September 3, 2013) was born in Duey, Yauco, Puerto Rico, to Pedro Castro and Lillian Rodriguez. His parents divorced when he was a child, and he moved to Pennsylvania with his mother and three siblings. They first lived in Reading, Pennsylvania, before settling in Cleveland, Ohio, where Castro's father and other relatives were living. His uncle Julio “Cesi” Castro was a shop owner who was widely known throughout the Puerto Rican community in Cleveland. He had nine siblings (both full and half). Castro was a devout Catholic.

Castro was sexually and physically abused throughout his childhood. He was molested starting at the age of five by a male neighbor in Puerto Rico and was also raped by an uncle. His mother had physically abused him by striking him with "belts, sticks and an open hand" daily and verbally abused him by "yelling negative things and cursing" at him. He was suspended in junior high for "touching a girl's breast". Castro attended Lincoln-West High School in Cleveland.

As an adult, Castro met his girlfriend, Grimilda Figueroa, when his family moved into a house across the street from hers in the 1980s. Castro and Figueroa lived with both sets of their parents until they moved into their own home at 2207 Seymour Avenue, located in Cleveland's Tremont neighborhood, in 1992. Their home was a two-story, 1,400-square-foot (130 m^{2}), four-bedroom, one-bathroom house with a 760-square-foot (71 m^{2}) unfinished basement built in 1890 and remodeled in 1956.

According to Figueroa's sister, Elida Caraballo, "All hell started breaking loose" after the couple moved into their new home. Caraballo claimed that Castro beat Figueroa, breaking her nose, ribs, and arms and causing a blood clot on her brain that resulted in an inoperable tumor. He also threw her down a flight of stairs, cracking her skull. In 1993, Castro was arrested for domestic violence, but was not indicted by a grand jury. After another alleged beating in 1996, Figueroa moved out of the house and secured custody of their four children. Police assisted in the move and detained Castro, but they did not press charges. Castro continued to threaten and attack Figueroa after she left him. In 2005, Figueroa filed charges in the Cuyahoga County Domestic Relations Court, which accused Castro of inflicting multiple severe injuries on her and of "frequently" abducting their daughters. The court granted her a temporary restraining order against Castro, but it was dismissed a few months later. Figueroa died in 2012 due to complications from her brain tumor.

Castro was in a relationship with Lilian Roldan from 2000 to 2003. She had described him as “gentleman” during their relationship.

Before his arrest at age 52, Castro worked as a bus driver for the Cleveland Metropolitan School District until he was fired in November 2012 for "bad judgment", including making an illegal U-turn with students on his bus, using his bus to go grocery shopping, leaving a child on the bus while he went for lunch at Wendy's, and leaving the bus unattended while he took a nap at home. At the time of his arrest, Castro's home was in foreclosure after three years of unpaid real estate taxes.

Castro performed in several local merengue bands and was featured in a live performance with Los Boy'z Del Merengue in 2003. Upon his arrest, Grupo Fuego, one of the bands he performed for, stated that he was not an official member of the band and that he was a sub twice in 2008.

== Kidnappings ==
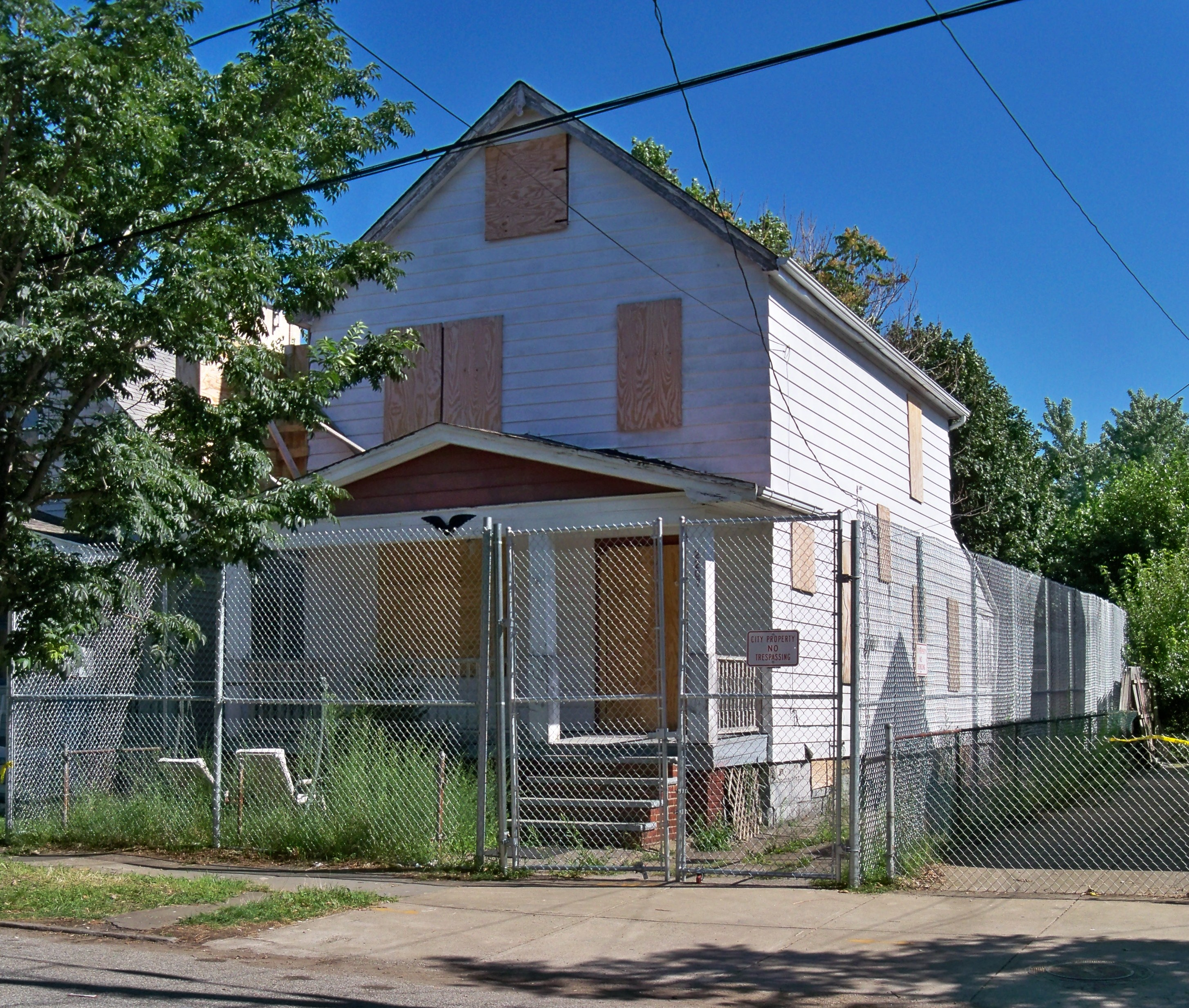
Castro's home at 2207 Seymour Avenue. It was demolished on August 7, 2013, as part of Castro's plea bargain.

Castro's modus operandi for each victim was similar: he kidnapped his targets by offering them a ride; he drove each to his home at 2207 Seymour Avenue, lured them inside, took them to the basement, and restrained them.

=== Michelle Knight ===
Michelle Knight (born April 23, 1981) disappeared on August 23, 2002, after leaving a cousin's house. She was 21 years old at the time. On the day of her disappearance, she was scheduled to appear in court for a child custody case involving her son Joey, who was in the custody of the state.

Following Knight's rescue, police acknowledged that limited resources had been spent on investigating her disappearance, in part because she was an adult. Authorities believed that she had run away voluntarily due to anger over losing custody of her son. According to Cleveland Deputy Police Chief Ed Tomba, she was "the focus of very few tips". She was removed from the National Crime Information Center database in November 2003, fifteen months after she disappeared, which made her largely unknown prior to her rescue; the FBI's decision to remove her record was heavily criticized. The Cleveland Division of Police (CDP) and the Federal Bureau of Investigation (FBI) maintain that her inclusion or exclusion had no bearing on her rescue.

=== Amanda Berry ===
Amanda Marie Berry (born April 22, 1986) disappeared on April 21, 2003, the day before her 17th birthday. She was last heard from around 8:00 p.m. when she called her sister to tell her that she was getting a ride home from her job at a Burger King at the corner of Lorain Ave & W. 110th St. The FBI initially considered her a runaway until a week after her disappearance, when an unidentified male used her cell phone to call her mother, Louwana Miller. He said: "I have Amanda. She's fine and will be coming home in a couple of days".

Berry was featured in a 2004 segment of Fox's America's Most Wanted (re-aired in 2005 and 2006), which linked her to Gina DeJesus, who by that point had also gone missing in Cleveland. Berry and DeJesus were profiled on The Oprah Winfrey Show and The Montel Williams Show, where self-proclaimed psychic Sylvia Browne told Berry's mother Louwana Miller in November 2004 that her daughter was dead and that she was "in water". This pronouncement devastated her mother, causing her to take down pictures and give away Berry's computer. However, Miller continued to search for Berry before dying from heart failure in early March 2006. Later that year, on December 25, 2006, Berry gave birth to a daughter. DNA evidence has confirmed that Castro was the father of the child.

Robert Wolford was a prison inmate who had lived in Tremont, and he claimed in July 2012 that he had information about the location of Berry's body. He led police to an empty lot on Cleveland's West Side, where they conducted a fruitless search. He was sentenced in January 2013 to 4 1/2 years in prison for obstruction of justice, making a false report, and making a false alarm.

=== Gina DeJesus ===
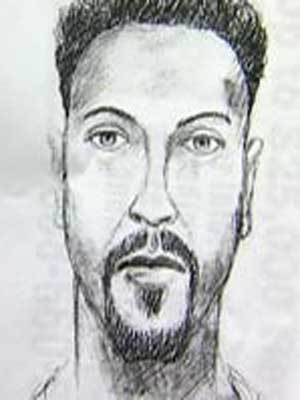
2004 FBI sketch of a suspect in DeJesus's disappearance

Georgina Lynn DeJesus (born February 13, 1990) went missing on April 2, 2004, at the age of 14. She was last seen at a payphone around 3:00 p.m. while on the way home from her middle school at West 105th Street and Lorain Avenue. At the time, she was friends with Castro's daughter Arlene. Shortly before Gina disappeared, she and Arlene had called Arlene's mother, Grimilda Figueroa, for permission to have a sleepover at DeJesus' house, but Figueroa replied that they could not and the two girls parted ways. Arlene was the last person to see DeJesus before her disappearance.

DeJesus was under the impression that Castro was picking her up to drop her off at home, and she trusted Castro because she was friends with his teenage daughter. No one witnessed her abduction and an Amber alert was not issued, which angered her father. He said in 2006, "The Amber Alert should work for any missing child. ... Whether it's an abduction or a runaway, a child needs to be found. We need to change this law."

A year after DeJesus' disappearance, the FBI released a composite sketch and description of a male suspect, described as, "Latino, 25 to 35 years of age, 5 feet 10 inches (178 cm), 165 to 185 pounds (75 to 84 kg), with green eyes, a goatee, and possibly a pencil-thin beard.” According to court records, Castro was 5 feet 7 inches (170 cm), 179 pounds (81 kg), with brown eyes and a goatee.

DeJesus was featured in the America's Most Wanted segment which linked her to Berry. The disappearances received regular media attention into 2012, while the families held public vigils. Castro attended at least two of these vigils, reportedly participated in a search party, and tried to get close to the DeJesus family. Castro's son Anthony was a journalism student in 2004, and he interviewed DeJesus's mother for an article about the disappearances in the Plain Press newspaper. Police kept the investigation open and offered a $25,000 reward for information.

According to Castro's uncle, his family knew the DeJesus family and had lived in the same neighborhood. Castro falsely claimed that he was not aware that DeJesus was a member of that family when he abducted her.

== Captivity ==
Upon kidnapping Michelle Knight, Castro took her to the upper floor of his house, tied her hands and feet together, and pulled her up using her hands, feet, and neck. He left her there for three days without food. Prosecutors at Castro's sentencing wrote that diaries kept by his victims "speak of forced sexual conduct, being locked in a dark room, anticipating the next session of abuse, dreams of someday escaping and being reunited with family, being chained to a wall, being held like a prisoner of war, missing the lives they once enjoyed, emotional abuse, Castro's threats to kill them, being treated like an animal, continuous abuse, and desiring freedom." Castro kept the girls in locked bedrooms, where he forced them to use plastic toilets that were "emptied infrequently". He fed them one meal a day and allowed them to shower twice a week at most. He also replaced the windows with solid wood, preventing any sunlight from entering the house.

Knight told police that Castro had impregnated her at least five times and had induced miscarriages each time through beatings, hitting her with dumbbells, punching her, and slamming her against walls. He also starved her. Knight's grandmother told reporters that she would require facial reconstruction surgery due to the beatings that she endured, and had lost hearing in one ear. At one point, Knight had a pet dog while in captivity, but Castro killed it by snapping its neck after it bit him while trying to protect Knight. DeJesus told law enforcement that Castro raped her, but she did not believe that he ever impregnated her.

On Christmas Day 2006, Castro allegedly ordered Knight to assist in the birth of Berry's child, which took place in a small inflatable swimming pool, and threatened to kill her if the baby did not survive. At one point, the baby stopped breathing, but Knight was able to resuscitate her. Castro occasionally took Berry's daughter out of the house, including to visit his mother; she called him "daddy" and Castro's mother "grandmother". In 2013, he showed one of his adult daughters a picture of the child and said that she was his girlfriend's daughter from a previous relationship; he had told others that she was his granddaughter. Berry taught her daughter how to read and write.

According to a statement from the CPD, officers visited Castro's home only once following the kidnappings to discuss an unrelated incident. Castro did not appear to be home at the time and was later interviewed elsewhere. Neighbors stated that they had called the police about suspicious activity observed at the home, but police claim that they have no record of any such calls. Castro's son Anthony reported that there were certain areas of the house that were locked and inaccessible. He also mentioned an occasion three weeks before the women's escape when Castro asked him if Berry would ever be found. Anthony said that he told Castro that Berry was likely dead, to which Castro responded: "Really? You think so?"

NBC affiliate WKYC reported that Castro recalled each of the three abductions in great detail during his interrogation and indicated that they were unplanned crimes of opportunity. According to WKYC's sources, Castro did not have an "exit plan" and believed that he would eventually be caught. He referred to himself as "coldblooded" and a sex addict. Police found a suicide note in the house in which he discussed the abductions and wrote that his money and possessions should be given to the kidnapped women if he were caught.

== Escape and rescue ==
On the morning of May 6, 2013, Berry was finally able to make contact with Castro's neighbors, leading to her escape with her 6-year-old daughter and the rescue of DeJesus and Knight by authorities. According to police, Castro had left the house that day and Berry realized that he had failed to lock the "big inside door", although the exterior storm door was bolted. She did not attempt to break through the outer door because she thought that Castro "was testing her", according to the police report. Previously, Castro had tested the women by leaving the house partially unlocked and exits unsecured. If they attempted to escape, he beat them. Instead, Berry screamed for help when she saw neighbors through the screen.

Neighbors have offered differing views of the escape. According to Berry in her memoir Hope: A Memoir of Survival in Cleveland, neighbor Angel Cordero responded to the screaming, but left as he was unable to communicate with Berry because he was a Spanish-speaker who spoke little English. Neighbor Charles Ramsey arrived at the scene and suggested kicking out the storm door's bottom panel. Together, Ramsey and Berry kicked a hole through the bottom of the door and Berry crawled through with her daughter. Berry told Ramsey that she and her child were being kept inside the house against her will. Once both were free, Ramsey called 9-1-1 from his home, while Berry called as well from the home of another neighbor, saying: "Help me, I'm Amanda Berry, I've been kidnapped, and I've been missing for ten years. And I'm here. I'm free now!"

Responding police officers Michael Tracy, Barbara Johnson and Anthony Espada entered Castro's house. They walked through an upstairs hallway with guns drawn, announcing themselves as CPD. After peeking out from a slightly opened bedroom door, Knight entered the hallway and leaped into an officer's arms, repeatedly saying, "You saved me." Soon afterward, DeJesus entered the hallway from another room. Knight and DeJesus walked out of the house, and all three young women, plus the child, were taken to MetroHealth Medical Center. Berry and DeJesus were released from the hospital the next day, and Knight was discharged four days later on May 10.

== Arrest and legal proceedings ==
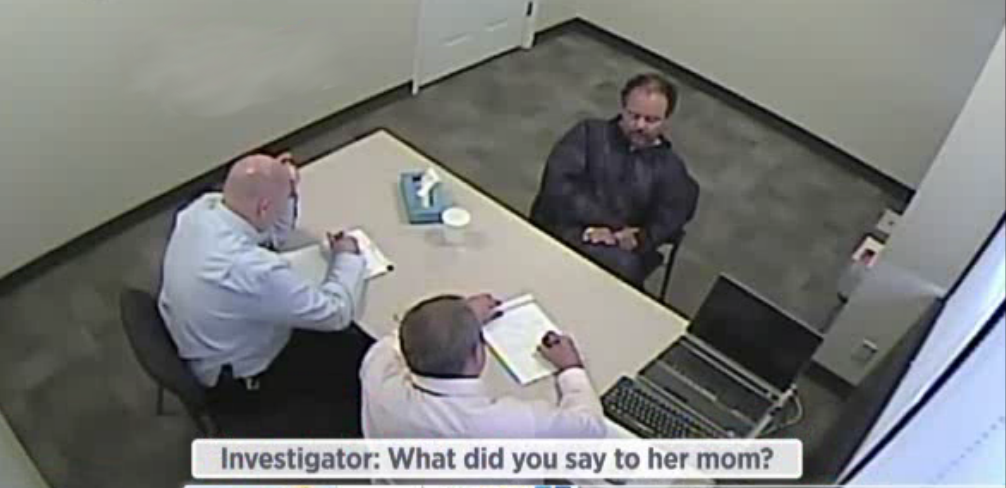
Screenshot showing Castro's interrogation by the FBI

Castro was arrested in a McDonald's parking lot shortly after the victims were rescued. He was charged with four counts of kidnapping and three counts of rape on May 8, which carry prison sentences of ten years to life in Ohio. Two of Castro's brothers, Pedro and Onil, were also initially taken into custody, but were released on May 9 after police announced that they had no involvement in the kidnappings. The charges against the two brothers were dropped.

Castro made his first court appearance at the Cleveland Municipal Court on May 9, where bail was set at $2 million per kidnapping charge, adding to a total of $8 million. Prosecutors intended to seek the death penalty against Castro. Additional charges were reported to be pending, including aggravated murder (for intentional induction of miscarriages), attempted murder, assault, a charge for each instance of rape, and a kidnapping charge for each day each captive was held. On May 14, Castro's attorneys said he would plead "not guilty" to all charges if indicted for kidnapping and rape.

A Cuyahoga County grand jury returned a true bill of indictment against Castro on June 7. It contained 329 counts, including two counts of aggravated murder (under different sections of the Ohio criminal code) for his role in the termination of one of the women's pregnancies. The indictments covered only the period from August 2002 to February 2007. The county prosecutor, Timothy J. McGinty, stated that the investigation was ongoing, and that any further findings would be presented to the grand jury. McGinty said that pursuing a death penalty specification would be considered following completion of indictment proceedings.

After entering a not guilty plea for Castro on June 12, one of his attorneys, Craig Weintraub, said that although some of the charges against Castro were indisputable, "it is our hope that we can continue to work toward a resolution to avoid having an unnecessary trial about aggravated murder and the death penalty". He noted, "We are very sensitive to the emotional strain and impact that a trial would have on the women, their families and this community". Castro was found competent to stand trial on July 3.

On July 12, a Cuyahoga County grand jury returned a true bill of indictment for the remainder of the period after February 2007. It brought the total to 977 counts: 512 counts of kidnapping, 446 of rape, seven of gross sexual imposition, six of felonious assault, three of child endangerment, two of aggravated murder, and one of possession of criminal tools. On July 17, Castro pleaded not guilty to the expanded indictment. He faced death by lethal injection if convicted on all of the charges.

Castro pleaded guilty on July 26 to 937 of the 977 charges against him, including charges of kidnapping, rape, and aggravated murder, as part of a plea bargain which called for consecutive sentences of life in prison plus 1,000 years, all without parole. Under the plea deal, Castro forfeited his right to appeal, and could not profit in any way due to his crimes. He also forfeited his assets, including his Seymour Avenue house, which prosecutors said would be demolished. Castro was told by Cuyahoga County Common Pleas Court Judge Michael Russo, "You will not be getting out. Is that clear?" to which Castro responded, "I do understand that, your honor." Castro also made comments about his "addiction to pornography" and "sexual problem", but was cut off by Judge Russo, who said such issues could be discussed at the August 1 sentencing hearing. A law firm representing Berry, DeJesus, and Knight released a statement that the three women were "relieved by today's plea. They are satisfied by this resolution to the case and are looking forward to having these legal proceedings draw to a final close in the near future".

At the sentencing hearing on August 1, Castro was sentenced to consecutive life terms in prison, plus 1,000 years, all without any possibility of parole. He was also fined $100,000. The court forfeited all of his property and assets to the Cuyahoga County government. Before his sentencing, Castro addressed the court for nearly twenty minutes, in which he said he was "a good person" and "not a monster", but that he was addicted to sex and pornography and had "practiced the art of masturbation" from a young age. He claimed that he had never beaten or tortured the women and insisted that "most" of the sex he had with them "was consensual". He shifted between apologizing and blaming the FBI for failing to catch him, as well as blaming his victims themselves for getting in a car with a stranger, along with insisting to the court that when he had sex with them, he had discovered they were not virgins. He would alternately shift back into apologetic comments, saying: "I hope they can find in their hearts to forgive me because we had a lot of harmony going on in that home".

The sentencing judge also heard from Knight and family members of Berry and DeJesus. Knight told Castro: "You took eleven years of my life away. I spent eleven years in hell; now your hell is just beginning. I will overcome all that has happened, but you will face hell for eternity. I will live on; you will die a little every day as you think of the eleven years of atrocities that you inflicted on us ... I can forgive you, but I will never forget."

== Aftermath ==
=== Survivors ===
Knight, Berry, and DeJesus released a video statement on July 9, 2013, thanking the public for their support. An attorney for Berry and DeJesus said that the women "still have a strong desire for privacy" and did not wish to speak to the media about their ordeal. The Cleveland Courage Fund, a bank account set up to help the women in their transition to independent life, had collected approximately $1.05 million at the time of the video's release. Before Berry's disappearance, her grandfather had promised to give her a classic Chevrolet Monte Carlo, built in the year when she was born. He kept the car after her kidnapping in case she was found alive, and gave it to her when she was released, although it was in need of restoration from having been unused. Several automotive shops offered to perform the restoration for free.

Knight discussed some of her ordeal in an interview with People magazine one year after her release, as well as her life leading up to her abduction. After her rescue, she legally changed her name to Lilly Rose Lee, and began to get several tattoos as her way of coping with the healing process. She also revealed that her son was adopted by his foster parents while she was in captivity and that she wanted to see him, but she does not speak about or name her son, out of respect for his parents. She planned to open a restaurant and dreamed of getting married, which she did in 2016, and hoped to adopt children, as her years of abuse and torture have made it unlikely for her to ever be able to give birth again. She also planned to reunite with Berry and DeJesus in the future, but began focusing on getting her own life back on track.

Berry and DeJesus received honorary diplomas from John Marshall High School in 2015. In an interview with WKYC, DeJesus says that she was volunteering for the Amber Alert committee, offering comfort to families of abducted children. She remains in touch with Berry and her family. In February 2017, Berry joined the staff of Fox affiliate WJW in Cleveland, where she hosts short recurring segments in which she reports missing person cases in order to help families reunite with missing family members. In April 2019, Berry reunited with Charles Ramsey, six years since her rescue, at an interview that was broadcast on WJW.

=== House demolition ===
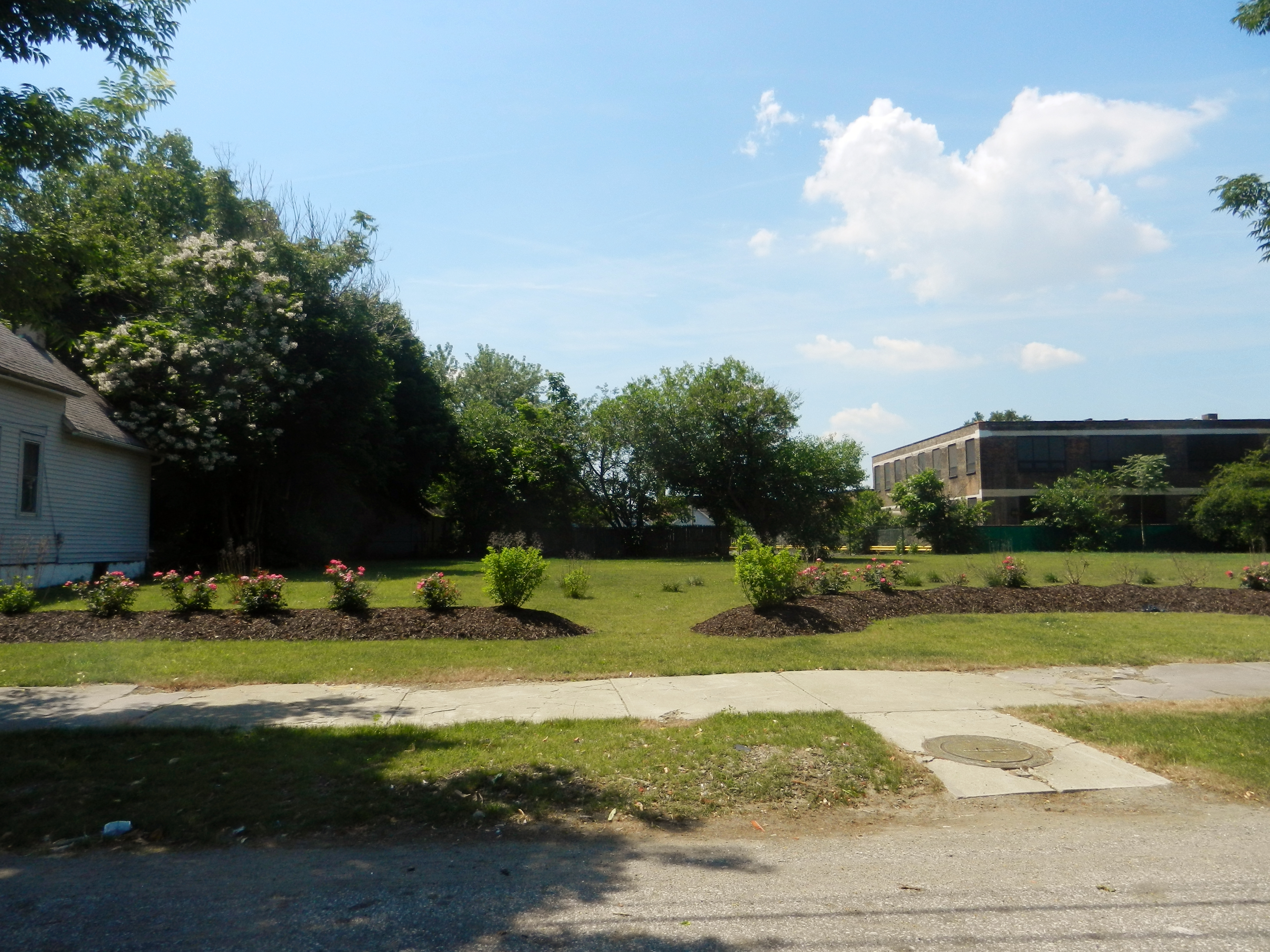
The former site of Castro's home on 2207 Seymour Avenue in June 2014, ten months after the demolition

As part of the plea bargain, the house where Castro had lived and held the women captive was demolished on August 7, 2013. Knight was present and handed out yellow balloons to spectators, which she said represented missing children. The balloons were released before DeJesus's aunt began the demolition with a swing of a crane. The house has been completely blurred out on the street view of Google Maps.

=== Castro's death ===
Castro was found hanging from a bed sheet with his pants pulled to his ankles and without underwear in his detention cell at the Correctional Reception Center in Orient, Ohio, on the evening of September 3, 2013, one month into his life sentence. He was 53 at the time of his death. He had left a handwritten letter, dated on the same day, quoting Bible passages in which he wrote, "If you confess...you will be saved" and "God loves you, for all are sinners", as well as a note with the text "love my kids and grandkids". Prison staff performed CPR on him before he was taken to the Ohio State University Wexner Medical Center in Columbus, where he was pronounced dead shortly after. The following day, Franklin County coroner Jan Gorniak announced that a preliminary autopsy had found the cause of Castro's death to be suicide by hanging. He was later cremated and his ashes were scattered in an unknown location.

On October 10, 2013, the Ohio Department of Rehabilitation and Correction released a report which suggested that Castro may have died accidentally from auto-erotic asphyxiation rather than suicide. Gorniak rejected the possibility, standing by her ruling of suicide. The report also said that two prison guards had falsified logs documenting their observation of Castro hours before he was found dead. They were placed on paid administrative leave. He was not on suicide watch at the time of his death but had been subjected to routine checks every thirty minutes due to his notoriety.

A consultant's report was released on December 3, and officially concluded that "all available evidence pointed to suicide, including a shrine-like arrangement of family pictures and a Bible in Castro's cell, an increasing tone of frustration in his prison journal and the reality of spending the rest of his life in prison while subject to constant harassment." The Ohio State Highway Patrol also reviewed the case and reached the same conclusion.

=== Castro's family ===
Many of Castro's family disowned him, denounced his actions, and apologized to the victims and their families. His brothers Pedro and Onil, who were arrested alongside him but later released, appeared in a CNN interview, denouncing him and expressing their shock. They also detailed how when they visited Ariel’s house, he would keep certain areas off limits for visitors. A member of Castro's extended family in Puerto Rico alleged that "a demon inside him made him lose his mind." Castro's son, journalist Ariel Anthony Castro, refused to visit his father in prison. He also struggled with sharing the same name as his father.

== Media depictions ==
=== Books ===
- Ramsey, Charles (2014). Dead Giveaway: The Rescue, Hamburgers, White Folks, and Instant Celebrity...What You Saw on TV Doesn't Begin to Tell the Story.... Cleveland: Gray & Company. ISBN 978-1938441516.
- Knight, Michelle; Burford, Michelle (2014). Finding Me: A Decade of Darkness, a Life Reclaimed: a Memoir of the Cleveland Kidnappings. New York: Weinstein Books. ISBN 978-1602862579.
- Knight, Michelle (2018). Life After Darkness: Finding Healing and Happiness After the Cleveland Kidnappings. Paris: Hachette Books. ISBN 978-1602865754.
- Glatt, John (2015). The Lost Girls: The True Story of the Cleveland Abductions and the Incredible Rescue of Michelle Knight, Amanda Berry, and Gina DeJesus. London: Macmillan. ISBN 978-1250036360.
- Berry, Amanda; DeJesus, Gina; Jordan, Mary; Sullivan, Kevin (2015). Hope: A Memoir of Survival in Cleveland. London: Penguin. ISBN 978-0698178953.

=== Films ===
- Cleveland Abduction (television film). Lifetime. 2015.
- The Cleveland Kidnappings (documentary). Discovery+. 2021.

== See also ==
- Michael J. Devlin
- Steven Stayner
- Gary Heidnik
- Natascha Kampusch
- Fritzl case
- Luoyang sexual slavery case
- Kidnapping of Colleen Stan
- Kidnapping of Elizabeth Smart
- Kidnapping of Jaycee Dugard
- Kidnapping of Tanya Nicole Kach
- List of long-term false imprisonment cases
