= When the Wind Blows (Patterson novel) =

1998 novel by James Patterson

- First edition
- Author: James Patterson
- Cover artist: Joe Ovies
- Language: English
- Genre: Science fiction
- Publisher: Little, Brown and Company
- Publication date: October 28, 1998
- Publication place: United States
- Media type: Print (hardback & paperback)
- ISBN: 978-0-316-69332-5
- OCLC: 38519044
- Dewey Decimal: 813/.54 21
- LC Class: PS3566.A822 W44 1998
- Followed by: The Lake House

When the Wind Blows is a novel by James Patterson, followed by the sequel The Lake House. It also served as inspiration for the Maximum Ride spin-off series for teens.

== Synopsis ==
Frannie Devin O'Neill is a veterinarian living in Bear Bluff, Colorado, whose husband was killed three years ago. She meets Kit Harrison, an FBI agent, when he rents a cabin in the woods behind her house. Kit is investigating a case in which Frannie's husband may be implicated. One night, after a friend's mysterious death, Frannie sees a small girl with wings, running in the forest. As she is growing closer to Kit, Frannie tells him about the winged girl. They search for her and manage to catch her. She tells them that her name is Max. She and her brother Matthew grew up as experiments in a sinister lab known as the "School", and were separated during their escape. Max guides Kit and Frannie back to the School. They break in and find the rest of Max's "flock", winged children named Peter, Wendy, Icarus, and Oz.

Kit and Frannie try to return home with the children, only to discover that Frannie's vet practice burnt down. Frannie realizes that her husband's old colleagues are involved with the School and witnesses are being murdered. The entire group is captured by the school's enforcer, Harding Thomas, and his men. Only Max evades capture and flies away. Frannie and Kit learn that the School planned to create an improved human race, with the scientists kidnapping newborns in order to experiment on them. As the School begins an auction to sell off the surviving experiments, Kit and Frannie fight their way free to rescue the children, including Matthew, who was also recaptured. Max returns with news crews following her, and the directors of the School die in a car crash trying to flee the scene. The School is exposed, and the bird-children are finally reunited with their biological families.

== Characters ==
- Max: An eleven-year-old girl with long blonde hair and emerald-green eyes. She is Matthew's older sister. She has white wings with silver-blue markings. Her wingspan is a little over nine feet. Frannie states that Max's IQ is in the 180s, although Max herself says that it is only 149. Her name is short for Maximum, and her test-subject name is "Tinkerbell".
- Dr. Frannie O'Neill: One of the main protagonists, a widowed veterinarian who finds Max. She learns that many of her friends and colleagues, as well as her late husband, are involved with the School and its human experimentation.
- Kit Harrison: An FBI agent who is supposed to be on vacation in Nantucket after a horrible tragedy killed his wife and his kids. He lives in the cabin in the woods behind the veterinary hospital. He has blond hair.
- Matthew: Max's brother. He loves his sister and tries to keep her away from the Doctors after she escapes. He is codenamed 'Peter Pan'. His wings are white, with silver and dark-blue markings.
- Ozymandias: Named after Ozymandias, a fictional character in the poem by the same name, he is second-born and alpha male. He would be the leader of the flock if Max died. He is not much younger than Max. He has brown hair, green eyes, and black wings.
- Icarus: A blind kid whom Max rescues from the School. The flock communicates with him using chirps and whistles so that he doesn't get lost while flying. He has fine, long, ash-blond hair. He is named after Icarus from the Greek legend.
- Peter: Named after Peter Pan, he is Wendy's twin. They are four years old, and therefore classified as "the young ones" by Oz and Max. They are of Chinese descent, with black bowl-cut hair. They are in the high-genius IQ range.
- Wendy: Named after Wendy from Peter Pan, she is Peter's twin. She has white wings, tipped with blue. According to Max, she calls all older women "Mama".
- Harding Thomas: Works with the scientists and is sent to recapture Max and Matthew when they escape. He is possibly codenamed 'Uncle Thomas'. He pretends to be kind to Matthew and Max to try to find out information or lure them back to the school, but is cruel if they refuse to cooperate.
- Eve: A human experiment and Adam's sister. The flock believed they were 'put to sleep' when they were babies, but they survived. According to Max, their IQ is 'off the planet'.
- Adam: Eve's brother. He was adopted by Gillian, Frannie's best friend, who renamed him Michael. He has blond hair. He was born in the same year as Peter and Wendy, 1994, and was their closest friend. Like his sister, he was believed to have been 'put to sleep'. When the flock is being held captive in Gillian's house, he helps Kit and Frannie escape to find them. His life expectancy is 200 years, however he dies in a car crash at age four.
- Gillian Puris: Frannie's best friend as well as Michael's (and Eve's) mother, although it is uncertain as to whether they are biologically related or adopted. Although she seems smart and sympathetic, she is actually closely related to the School and was keeping an eye on Frannie after her husband's death. Gillian later holds Frannie, Kit, and the flock hostage at her house and tries to sell the bird children to rich companies. When that plan fails, she, her husband, and Michael try to escape but are killed in a car wreck.
- Dr. Peyser: The creator and head of the School. He works at an in-vitro clinic where he impregnates women and delivers their babies. He tells the mothers that the babies are dead, when in reality they have been brought to the School for experiments.

== Reboot ==
Following this duology, Patterson wrote the Maximum Ride series for teens, with the first book published in 2005. The series took a similar premise with avian-human hybrids, with characters resembling those in the duology, but was written for a younger audience and focused on the younger characters. While When the Wind Blows and The Lake House focused more on characterization, suspense, and the moral implications of genetic engineering, the "Maximum Ride" series was a science fiction adventure.

Patterson included a foreword to the first Maximum Ride book explaining that it took place in a different continuity and the similarities were minor, with only the names of Max and the School being the same. However, several themes carried through to the teen series. The auction of genetic experiments in When the Wind Blows resembles the climax of Saving the World and Other Extreme Sports (2007). Max becomes pregnant and gives birth in both The Lake House (2003) and Maximum Ride Forever (2015).
