= Fang: A Maximum Ride Novel =

2010 novel by James Patterson

- Author: James Patterson
- Original title: The Sky Is Falling: A Maximum Ride Novel
- Language: English
- Genre: Young adult fiction
- Publisher: Little, Brown
- Publication date: March 15, 2010 (North America)
- Publication place: United States of America
- Media type: Book
- Pages: 336
- Preceded by: MAX: A Maximum Ride Novel
- Followed by: Angel: A Maximum Ride Novel

Fang: A Maximum Ride Novel is the sixth book in the Maximum Ride series written by James Patterson. It was released on February 5, 2010 in Australia, New Zealand and the UK and was released in the US on March 15, 2010. Its tag line is: He has always been there for her. Now he may be gone forever.

In January 2010, free Audio Excerpts of the first six chapters of Fang became available on James Patterson's official website.

== Plot ==
The novel begins with the Flock traveling to Chad in Africa. They are there to help the residents by giving them medical supplies and food, as part of the Coalition to Stop the Madness project, but are attacked by local rebels who are opposed receiving help from outsiders. After beating the rebels, the Flock proceed to do volunteer work, such as distributing rice.

On the second night, Angel reveals that 'Fang will be the first to die', causing an upset in the Flock, before Dr. Hans, a former Itex worker, interrupts. He invites Max and Angel to breakfast where introduces them to his new experiment, Dylan, a bird kid like them but someone who cannot fly well. At breakfast, it is revealed that Dr. Hans plans on forcing the human race to evolve by using the Flock as evolutionary templates. He tries to enlist Max's help by showing her the advancements he has currently made, the most extreme being cutting off and regrowing his own finger. She, however, refuses to help, and quickly returns to the Flock where she instructs them to wait.

Back in America, in the E house on the cliff of a canyon—where the Flock resided at the beginning of Maximum Ride: The Angel Experiment—the members of the Flock are safe. Total is back with them after staying with Max's mother, and Max and Angel still have not spoken. Max, after deliberation, blackmails the Flock into a self-taught home school, because they need to learn things in order to understand the enemy. This leads to a trip to an unnamed museum where Iggy voices his wish that he was not blind.

Returning home, the Flock fight, and Max suddenly decides that tomorrow will be her birthday. She asks if anyone else wants to turn a year older, and so a party is planned for all of them the following day. While exchanging gifts, Jeb arrives with Dylan in a black four wheel drive Jeep as it is revealed that Dylan is unable to fly well. Max then teaches him how to fly starting with pushing him off of the roof. Afterwards, the rest of the Flock are still mad at Max. Angry at Jeb, Max flies away, and Fang goes after her. During this time, the others are attacked by Erasers, who were supposedly extinguished in Maximum Ride: Saving the World and Other Extreme Sports. It is also revealed that Dylan has been trained to fight, and can self-heal his own wounds.

When Max and Fang return, the Flock vote Max out because she and Fang were not there to help them fight the Erasers. Instead, Max and Fang were making out in a tree, causing the flock to feel they are too caught up in their relationship to lead and help the group. They both leave for Las Vegas. Meanwhile, the water supply to the house is tainted with a genetic accelerator that induces mutations. Angel replaces Max as Flock leader, and takes the new group to a celebrity party in Hollywood. They are attacked when Max and Fang find them, and are suffering from the side effects of the genetic accelerator. Jeb is shot while protecting the Flock, but survives.

After recovering, Angel leaves to join Dr. Hans as Max resumes leadership. Later, a vague letter from Fang warns Max not to follow him. Fang finds Angel and Dr. Hans, but is tranquilized, and he passes out. When Fang comes to, he is badly beaten and restrained to a bed. Dr. Hans plans to experiment on Fang with his genetic accelerator drug and injects Fang with it. However, the drug ends up causing him to die. Angel tells(through her mind) Max to come to rescue him, but when the Flock arrives, they are too late. Max desperately tries to bring Fang around, but to no avail. She finally stabs a needle of adrenaline into his chest and after a few moments, Fang is brought back to life. Then Dylan tries to kill Dr. Hans with a needle he finds, but when he realizes it is against the Flock's way to kill in cold blood he stabs himself with it in a suicide attempt, but lives.

In the epilogue Total marries Akila. Fang leaves the reception early, and when the Flock arrives back home after the reception, Max goes to look for Fang, but instead finds a letter addressed to her. Max reads the letter aloud to the rest of the Flock. In the letter, Fang tells Max that he loves her more than anything, but it is because of their love that he is leaving the Flock. He tells Max that everyone was right about them starting to only care about themselves and that it puts the others in danger he also calls Max sweetheart which surprises everyone. The rest of the Flock still needs her to be a leader and she can't do that with him around. He also tells her that he knows where he is going and to please not look for him. At the end of the letter, Fang makes a promise to Max. He says that if in 20 years, if both of them are still alive, and the world is still in one piece, then he will meet her at the top of the cliff where they learned to fly like the hawks in Maximum Ride: The Angel Experiment.

After the epilogue, Max goes through Fang's files on an old laptop since Nudge is using the new one. The first thing Max sees is Fang's MaxProCon.doc showing the pros and cons of Max, such as, "She's a good leader, but a drill sergeant." In the next file, Fang is describing what happened in Africa. Then, he has his "giftlist" for everyone's birthday, and describes Max's gift. In the next file he talks about when he and Max were in Las Vegas. The file after that contains a letter to Dylan where he writes that he hates Dylan more than anyone because he likes Max and Dylan is trying to be with her. After this, a long string of questions is shown, written by a fan called "Jessie." Jessie (whose gender is not confirmed) asks such unusual questions as "Do you smoke apples?" "Would you tell us if you were gay?" "Has Angel ever read your mind when you were having dirty thoughts about Max and gone 'OMG' and you were like 'D:'?" Fang's responses range from "Uhhhh...." to "hahahahahahaha" to "I could never be as Fangalicious as you'd want me to be." He ends it by saying that he has been by Max's side forever but he now cannot be around anymore because his anger towards Dylan is "clouding my decisions" and that he does not "know what the right thing to do" is.

== Main characters ==
- Maximum (Max) Ride-The title character and leader of the Flock. She is also the first-person narrative of the book. She acts as a mother figure and leader to the rest of the Flock. She has the ability to fly at extremely fast speeds, achieving over 200 miles per hour and is able to breathe underwater. She also has a Voice in her head that gives her various advice and puzzling statements. Max is romantically involved with Fang but later ends up with Dylan, and turns 15 in the book. Max is about 5' 8" with dirty blonde hair that has 'sun streaks in it', according to Angel. She has a wingspan of 14 feet. Her feathers are light brown and has blonde streaks across them.
- Fang-Co-captain of the Flock. He is brooding, and more cold and calculating than Max. Has the ability to blend into his surroundings by remaining perfectly still and is able to breathe under water. He is romantically involved with Max. He turns 15 in the book. He is about 6' 3" with olive skin, dark eyes, and ink-black hair. He has a 14' wingspan and glossy black feathers which turn purple in the sun. He also leaves Max to start his own flock.
- Iggy-The Flock's blind weapons expert and Gazzy's best friend. He was not born blind, but his eyes were destroyed in a night-vision experiment while he was at the lab. He has the ability to "see" the color of an object by touching it, and can also identify a person by touching them. He also turns 15 in the book.
- Nudge-Her real name is Monique. She is African-American and very talkative. She turns 12 in the book. She has the ability to hack into computers and can attract metal to herself.
- Gasman (Gazzy)-He is called the Gasman due to his unstable digestive system. Angel is his younger sister, and they are the only two blood-related siblings in the Flock. Has the ability to produce nauseating gas in large amounts, and the ability to mimic any sound. He turns 9 in the book.
- Angel-The youngest member of the Flock, she is 7 years old and Gasman's younger sister. She has the ability to read and control minds, can breathe underwater, and she can also talk to fish, and can even morph into the shape of a bird of paradise. She believes that she could be a better leader of the flock, and tried becoming the leader. She gets on Max's nerves sometime.
- Total-A talking dog that also has wings on his back and he can use them to fly. He is in love with Akila, whom he ends up marrying at the end of the book.
- Dylan-The latest installment in the Flock. Dylan was created by a set of scientists that aimed to create another bird kid. Dylan was cloned from the original Dylan who died in a car crash. Dylan is Maximum's perfect "other half". Dylan has blonde hair, blue eyes, and tan skin. Dylan is an excellent fighter and flier as well as a singer. His singing is said to "stop a rabid dog in its tracks."
- The Voice- The voice that has been in Max since The Angel Experiment. The voice gives sound advice to Max, but in the recent books the voice has not appeared as much in earlier books.

== Reception ==
The reviewer for Booklist Publication said that this book will excite the readers of the Maximum Ride series.
