= Angel: A Maximum Ride Novel =

Book by James Patterson

- Author: James Patterson
- Language: English
- Genre: Young Adult Fiction
- Publisher: Little, Brown And Company
- Publication date: February 14, 2011 North America
- Publication place: United States of America
- Media type: Book
- Pages: 291
- Preceded by: Fang: A Maximum Ride Novel
- Followed by: Nevermore: The Final Maximum Ride Adventure

Angel: A Maximum Ride Novel is the seventh novel in the Maximum Ride series created by James Patterson. It was released on February 14, 2011.

== Plot ==
Max, leader of the genetically-engineered kids known as the Flock, is suffering from depression since her teammate and love interest Fang left. However, she feels drawn to new team member Dylan. Their scientist ally Jeb arrives at the house where the Flock is staying, bringing Dylan's "father," Dr. Gunther-Hagen. They tell Max that she is to be the leader of the new generation of mutants, Gen 77. Dr. Gunther-Hagen also says that Max and Dylan are meant to be mates and rule together, although Max's mother Dr. Martinez shuts down this conversation.

Fang, meanwhile, is busy forming his own group of mutant teens with various powers. One member is Max's formerly villainous clone, now calling herself Maya. There is romantic tension between Fang and Maya.

Dr. Martinez convinces the Flock to visit the Gen-77 kids, but on the way, their plane is attacked and crashes. They narrowly manage to get free and rescue the adults from falling, but in the confusion, Dr. Gunther-Hagen disappears. Max and Dylan grow closer. They discover a school filled with many-eyed sniper children, mutants who claim that they need to kill the humans to improve the world. They become aware of the Doomsday Group, a cult holding rallies at school and leaving people in a strange brainwashed spell chanting about killing humans and the superiority of mutants. Max's half-sister Ella and Flock member Iggy are affected.

The Flock is able to deprogram Iggy. Jeb and Dr. Martinez have vanished, and the Flock reluctantly come to the conclusion that they are involved with the Doomsday Group. In California, Fang's gang struggles, but Fang grows romantically closer to Maya. Fang discovers that the Doomsday Group will be at a convention in San Diego, and calls Max and the Flock for help. The Flock and Fang's gang immediately clash, with Max and Fang especially jealous of each other's new relationships. After seeing the Doomsday Group at the convention, they fly to Paris, where the Doomsday Group is about to blow up the city. The two teams work together to warn people and disarm the bombs. The bombs go off, and afterwards, the youngest Flock member, Angel, is missing and presumed dead. The groups sadly part ways. In the epilogue, Angel is revealed to be alive, in the custody of mysterious scientists who want to experiment on her.

== Critical reception ==
The novel received universal negative reviews.
