= School's Out =

School's Out may refer to:

== Film and television ==
- School's Out (1930 film), a short film in the Our Gang series
- School's Out (1992 film), a Canadian TV movie based on the series Degrassi High
- The Substitute 2: School's Out, a 1998 film starring Treat Williams
- School's Out (1999 film), a German film of the 1990s
- School's Out (2002 film), a UK TV short featuring Oliver James
- Recess: School's Out, a 2001 animated film based on the TV series Recess
- School's Out! The Musical, a 2005 TV special based on the American animated series The Fairly OddParents
- School's Out (2015 film), a 2015 film by Jared Cohn
- School's Out (2018 film), a 2018 French social drama thriller film
- School's Out (1980 TV series), an educational series for HSC students hosted by Tim Burns.
- School's Out (TV series), a 2006 BBC television programme

== Other media ==
- School's Out (album), a 1972 album by Alice Cooper
  - "School's Out" (song), a song from the album
  - School's Out and Other Hits, a 2004 greatest hits album by Cooper
- "School Is Out", a 1961 song by Gary U.S. Bonds

== See also ==
- Maximum Ride: School's Out Forever, a novel by James Patterson
