= The Lake House (Patterson novel) =

2003 novel by James Patterson

- First edition
- Author: James Patterson
- Cover artist: Min Roman
- Language: English
- Genre: Science fiction novel
- Publisher: Little, Brown and Company
- Publication date: 2003
- Publication place: United States
- Media type: Print (hardback & paperback)
- Pages: 376 pp
- ISBN: 0-316-60328-7
- OCLC: 50913549
- Preceded by: When the Wind Blows

The Lake House is a 2003 novel by James Patterson, a sequel to When the Wind Blows. Elements of this series also appeared in Patterson's Maximum Ride series for younger readers.

== Plot ==
The Lake House told the story of six extraordinary children, endowed with the power to fly after genetic engineering merged their DNA with that of birds, and who had to fight for their lives against scientists who wanted to kill them, thinking that they were monsters of despair. With them came the help of Dr. Frannie O'Neil and suspended FBI agent Thomas "Kit" Brennan.

== Synopsis ==
The Lake House starts some time after When the Wind Blows. The bird children — Max, Matthew, Ozymandias, Wendy, Peter, and Icarus — are all depressed and unhappy in their new "normal" lives and wish to return to live with Frannie and Kit. Frannie and Kit miss the children as well and engage in a courtroom battle to regain custody of the children. The judge decides that the children will remain living with their biological parents until an appeal hearing is made. Meanwhile, a doctor named Ethan Kane begins trying to capture the bird children and bring them to the place he works, a nightmarish place called the Hospital. In the Hospital, faceless people are murdered and dissected and their organs are taken and used for the "Resurrection" of rich and famous people such as former presidents and prime ministers.

Going back to their lives, the children are forced to put up with harassment from various reporters and paparazzi. After a visit from one of the reporters, it is revealed that Max knows about the hospital from working at the School, but was trained not to talk about it on the threat of death. Upset, she goes to Oz for comfort. He tells her that she is "drop dead gorgeous". Shortly after, the two begin a sexual relationship.

After Kane attempts to kidnap Max and Matthew at their new home, the siblings escape and meet up with the rest of the flock. The children then fly to Frannie's house for protection. That night, Hospital workers try to break into Frannie's house. She calls the police and sets her house on fire. She and the children then escape through the basement and meet up with Kit.

Kit takes them to Washington D.C. for help. While left alone, hit men hired by Kane capture the children. Oz is killed while trying to protect Max. Frannie and Kit try to rescue the children but are drugged and hooked up to holographic monitors, which give the patients pleasant visions while their organs are being taken. Max and the flock manage to escape and Frannie and Kit are released later. Although they try to expose the hospital, all evidence of their experiments are hidden and the V.I.Ps seen there have alibis.

At the appeal hearing, the judge decides to return the children to the custody of Frannie and Kit. The family rejoices and moves back to the Lake House. There, Frannie notices that Max has been in her room all morning. She goes to investigate and learns that Max has laid two eggs — her babies with Oz. Max spends the next few weeks caring for the eggs. One night, Kane breaks into Max's room to steal the eggs. Max fights him off and knocks him out of the window, fulfilling her promise to Oz that she'd break his neck. Four weeks later, the eggs hatch. Max's winged babies are a boy and a girl, who she names Ozymandias and Frances Jane. The book ends with Max thinking that she can't wait to teach them how to fly.
