= Nevermore: The Final Maximum Ride Adventure =

2012 novel by James Patterson

- Author: James Patterson
- Cover artist: Larry Rostant
- Language: English and French
- Genre: Young Adult Fiction
- Publisher: Little, Brown And Company
- Publication date: August 6, 2012 (North America)
- Publication place: United States of America
- Media type: Book
- Pages: 368
- Preceded by: Angel: A Maximum Ride Novel
- Followed by: Maximum Ride Forever

Nevermore: The Final Maximum Ride Adventure is the eighth book in the Maximum Ride series by James Patterson. It was released on August 6, 2012.

First copies of the preceding book, Angel: A Maximum Ride Novel listed the release date of Nevermore as being some time in February 2012. However, in the summer of 2011, fans of the series discovered a publication by the publisher which announced that the book had been pushed back to August 6, 2012. A five-chapter excerpt from Nevermore, with minor discrepancies from the final published version, was released in the paperback "Deluxe Edition" of Angel: A Maximum Ride Novel in February 2012.

== Plot ==
Max and her Flock prepare to go to school while they live in Oregon in their new house. Dylan is now a member of the Flock, while Fang has left to form his own group and Angel is missing, presumed dead. A mysterious new group called the '99 Percenters' is quickly growing powerful. At school, a teacher tells Dylan to capture Fang so they can perform tests on him, and threatens to kill or hurt Max if Dylan doesn't obey.

Meanwhile, Fang and his group are attacked by Erasers led by a clone of Ari. Two of Fang's team members, Kate and Star, reveal they are traitors, and Maya is killed by Ari and dies in Fang's arms. Angel has a vision of these events in the lab where she's held prisoner. She is operated on and realizes that Jeb and Dr. Martinez are working for the 99 Percenters. She realizes in horror that the white coats have clipped her wings and blinded her like Iggy.

With his group scattered, Fang hears the Voice in his head telling him to go to Max, and sets out hitchhiking due to his injured wing. Meanwhile, Max and Dylan are having a date in a treehouse that Dylan built. Their candlelit dinner is interrupted by Nudge, Iggy and Gazzy spying on them. Their Voices have told them to record everything so they have a video camera. The treehouse ends up burning down.

Fang arrives and tells the Flock about a comment on his blog claiming to know where Angel is. They successfully find Angel in a lab where all the scientists have killed themselves. Angel's vision is beginning to recovery and the Flock heads back to Oregon. Dylan, furious at Fang and Max's reconciliation, begins destroying things throughout the neighborhood. Jeb, the Ari clone, and an army of Erasers show up at the Flock's house to kill Fang because his DNA is the next step to immortality. Dylan arrives and kills Ari, disabling the rest of the Erasers, but then tries to kill Fang. Max is able to stop him and he leaves.

Dr. Martinez arrives in a helicopter and explains that she was brainwashed by Jeb. She takes the Flock to a safe place, a tropical island with a treehouse village populated by other enhanced kids. Max's half-sister Ella is also there and she and Iggy kiss. Dr. Martinez explains that a deadly disease called 'H8E' has been released to kill all the humans. The bird-kids are immune to it and the island is filled with failsafes and protections.

When Fang and Max are kissing in Max's tree house when Dylan appears. They are both furious to see him. He warns them that everyone has to go to the cliffs for safety, not the cave shelters. Max and Fang refuse to believe him at first, but then Angel and Max get into an argument, with Angel revealing that she's the Voice Max has been hearing in her head. Then the sky explodes, knocking them all out of the sky. As a giant tsunami approaches, Fang and Max kiss.

Max awakens underwater. Due to her powers, she is able to breathe. Dylan pulls her out. Fang and Angel are also there. Angel telepathically listens to Dr. Martinez's thoughts and says that the others are all safely inside the caves, monitoring satellite connections all over the world. The island is partially destroyed and whole countries may be covered in water, ash or flame. Max muses that she and the others were made to survive in this new world, and tells Fang she loves him.

== Critical reception ==
The novel was received with an overwhelmingly negative reception from both critics and fans of the series, being criticized for being riddled with plot holes and stereotypical story clichés, and having little literary value.
