= MAX: A Maximum Ride Novel =

Book by James Patterson

- Author: James Patterson
- Original title: Waterwings
- Cover artist: George Montgomery
- Language: English
- Genre: Young Adult Fiction
- Publisher: Little, Brown and Company
- Publication date: September 15, 2009
- Publication place: United States
- Media type: (Hardback)
- Pages: 320
- Preceded by: Maximum Ride: The Final Warning
- Followed by: Fang: A Maximum Ride Novel

MAX: A Maximum Ride Novel is the fifth book in the Maximum Ride series, written by James Patterson. The book was released on September 15, 2009. MAX was published by Little, Brown and Company.

== Plot ==
Dr. Martinez and several of her colleagues establish the Coalition to Stop the Madness (CSM), an ecological conservation effort which involves spreading environmental awareness at the Flock's public air shows, taking place in some of the world's most polluted cities. During a show in Los Angeles, the Flock find themselves under fire from an assassin in the middle of an aerial performance. The crowd however thinks that this is all part of the show and applauds at the Flock's various maneuvers to avoid the sniper's bullets. The day ends with the Flock attacking the assassin only to have him blow himself up inside a nearby warehouse to hide his identity. A later investigation of the scene results in the find of a pistol biologically attached to a recovered stump of an arm.

At another show in Mexico City (which the Flock dislike due to the air being so polluted it made the air uncomfortable to breathe) the Flock do another aerial performance, when they see the entire stadium is surrounded by 60 bionic human "ninjas" (which Max later nicknames M-Geeks). Despite wanting to avoid harming performance crew, Max's biological mother, Dr. Valencia Martinez, her half sister Ella, Total, Dr. Brigid Dwyer, Max's biological father Jeb Batchelder, the surrounding reporters, and the 114,000 fans packed into the stadium, the Flock has no choice but to battle and destroy them on the field.

Later, Jeb, Valencia, and the Flock are all taken to a secret location on the outskirts of the city for protection. The group decide that it is best that they cancel the shows due to the inability for tight enough security. In the middle of the night, after Max and Fang have a conflict over Brigid (who had apparently taken a liking to Fang, much to Max's jealousy) Max goes on a flight by herself, only to be shot in the wing by a group of M-Geeks. She meets Mr. Chu, a short Asian man who claims to represent many of the world's wealthiest and most powerful people. He tells Max to put a stop to CSM. When she refuses, she is warned that she will regret her decision. Max was let go and returned to the Flock.

After refusing to explain her injuries, and later asking Jeb about Mr. Chu (who lies badly about knowing nothing of him) Jeb and Valencia suggest that the group go to the Day and Night School for the gifted. Despite Max's refusal, the Flock agrees to try it out. Nudge finds the school incredibly fun, much to Max's dismay. Nudge decided that she wanted to stay at the school, and that she wanted to have her wings removed so she would be "normal". Shortly, Max and Fang flew out into the desert and sat by a boulder. The two of them talked over what Nudge said, and they end up kissing. When they arrive back at the safe home, they discover that Dr. Martinez has been kidnapped. They go to a boot camp in Hawaii at Pearl Harbor where they surprise their teachers and excel at all their survival courses. Then on the night they are approved to go on the sub expedition to search for Dr. Martinez (who is, based on the video tapes sent to them, believed to be held on a boat located somewhere off the coast of Hawaii in the Pacific Ocean, fairly close to where millions of fish seem to be mysteriously dying) Fang and Max go on a "date". The night starts off perfectly, with many unexplainable feelings for Fang filling Max. However, it is interrupted when they are assaulted by a group of M-Geeks who the two send hurling off a cliff. Later, on their way back to the base, they encounter Angel, Iggy, and Gazzy, who had been stung by a poisonous fish (which he quickly heals from the next day, thanks to the Flock's rapid regeneration abilities) and find that Nudge had returned to them.

The next day the Flock and Brigid, who surprises Total with his beloved Akila, all arrive on the USS Minnesota. Brigid continues to "flirt" with Fang which upsets Max, who is already unhappy to be on a submarine. Later on the expedition, Max and Brigid take the miniature sub to take a closer look at the seabed for any signs of contamination that might have killed the fish. As they return they find the Minnesota attacked by a group of M-Geeks which Max takes out with the mini-sub's mechanical arms as well as with a homemade bomb from Gazzy and Iggy.

When neither seem to fend them off completely, Gazzy and Iggy come up with a way to destroy them with the same technique as the lightning rod weapon they created when M-Geeks had attacked the group's safe house before leaving for Hawaii, destroying them all. But as the group comes across radioactive barrels labeled "Property of the Chu Corporation" which reveals the cause of the dead fish, an apparent underwater mountain that was seen in earlier surveillance tapes emerges from the sea floor. Inside it is an underwater cave which Max and Fang explore along with two accompanying scientist, one being Brigid, the other a friend of Dr. Martinez. As Max finds herself lost and attacked by a giant squid, she loses her underwater breather, only to discover that like Angel, she and Fang have developed gills. After fending off the squid, the group comes across a group of frighteningly enormous underwater snakes that had apparently mutated from the radioactive material. Angel telepathically convinces them that they mean to help and the snakes lead them to a giant underwater dome where Max finds her mother being held. After breaching the forcefield, Max barely escapes with her mother as the facility is flooded due to the acidic mucus of the snakes burning through the dome.

After returning to the base where Dr. Martinez is in recovery from torture and dehydration, The Voice in Max's head tells her to beware of Mr. Chu as well as Brigid who were both in conference about the barrels found. As the Flock leaves, Max and Fang hold hands as they fly, Max having confessed her love to Fang before they entered the cave. Max discusses with Fang how special the Flock is and how happy she is for them to be together. Fang and Max kiss, and Angel mentally approves of their relationship.

== Main characters ==
Max: (age 14) Maximum Ride, the leader of the flock and main protagonist. She has a voice in her head that gives her cryptic information about her task of saving the world. She also has the ability to fly at speeds of up to 200+ miles.

Fang: (age 14) Max's best friend and "right wing man." There are awkward romantic feelings between him and Max. He can disappear when he is still, quiet, and surrounded by a dark background. He is mostly dark and mysterious, he does not talk much.

Iggy: (age 14) Explosives expert along with Gazzy. Iggy is blind, though he can see with white surroundings. When he touches an object, he can feel its color. Never misses a high five.

The Gasman: (age 8) He is a blood relative to Angel. (They're the only blood siblings in the flock.) Has digestion problems (from which his powers stem), and can make bombs out of almost anything. Is called "The Gasman" for reasons unnamed (you'll surely find out). He can also imitate any voice perfectly.

Nudge: (age 11) Nudge is very talkative and loves fashion. She has the ability to sense people via touch (i.e. if she touches a bench, she immediately knows almost everything about the person who last sat there). This power comes in handy with computers. She can hack into almost any computer in seconds. She can also attract magnetic items with her hands.

Angel: (age 6) Angel is Gazzy's younger sister. She can read and control other's minds. She can also change her appearance, talk to fish, and breathe underwater.

Total: He is Angel's black Scottie. Total is a talking, mutant dog that is growing wings. He has a romantic relationship with a white malamute dog named Akila.

Dr. Valencia Martinez: Max's mom. She is a veterinarian. Makes awesome chocolate chip cookies.

Mr. Chu: Megalomaniac and main antagonist.

Dr. Brigid Dwyer: CSM researcher. Flirts with Fang and although does not try to, makes Max jealous. Is called nicknames like "Dr. Amazing", "Dr. Wonderful", and "Dr. Stupendous". Is very intelligent and graduated high school at age 12.

John: CSM researcher.

== Reception ==
MAX made it to the #1 New York Times bestseller list in the first week of its release. Despite this, the novel received negative reviews from both fans and critics.
