= Maximum Ride =

Series of fantasy young adult novels by James Patterson

- Maximum Ride: The Angel Experiment; Maximum Ride: School's Out Forever; Maximum Ride: Saving the World and Other Extreme Sports; Maximum Ride: The Final Warning; MAX: A Maximum Ride Novel; Fang: A Maximum Ride Novel; Angel: A Maximum Ride Novel; Nevermore: The Final Maximum Ride Adventure; Maximum Ride Forever; Hawk; City of the Dead
- Author: James Patterson, Gabrielle Charbonnet (uncredited, except for "Hawk")
- Country: United States
- Language: English
- Genre: Thriller, action, science fiction, science fantasy
- Publisher: Headline; Doubleday; Little, Brown and Company
- Published: April 11, 2005 – July 6, 2020
- Media type: Print (hardback & paperback)

Maximum Ride is a series of young adult science fantasy novels by American author James Patterson. The series centers on the adventures of Maximum "Max" Ride and her family, called the Flock, who are winged human-avian hybrids created at a lab called The School. The series was inspired by Patterson's earlier novels When the Wind Blows and The Lake House, which were intended for older readers.

== Plot ==
=== The Angel Experiment ===
Max, Fang, Iggy, Nudge, Gasman, and Angel are human-avian hybrids living in hiding. When Angel is abducted, the rest of the Flock searches for her while fighting a number of obstacles including physical ailments, the wolf-human Erasers, and the evil scientists at the experimental lab called "The School".

=== School's Out - Forever ===
The Flock travels to Washington, D.C., where they hope to find the answers to their origins. They are taken in by a former FBI agent and placed into a regular school system to live as "normal kids." Erasers attack the school, and the Flock must flee again to find safety. Max meets her murderous clone, Max II, and must battle with her. The Flock learns details about their creators, the Itexicon Corporation.

=== Saving the World and Other Extreme Sports ===
The Flock must stop the Itexicon Corporation, who plan to destroy half of the world's population. The boys and girls split after a disagreement, and work from separate angles to take down Itex and save the world. Max learns that Jeb Batchelder, the scientist with mysterious motivations, is her biological father.

=== The Final Warning ===
Government officials ask the Flock to help a team of scientists study pollution levels in the oceans around Antarctica. While there, a few members of the Flock are captured by the Uber-Director and taken to Florida. The rest of the group makes their way to rescue them and defeat this new villain in the midst of a hurricane. Max and Fang begin a romantic relationship.

=== MAX: A Maximum Ride Novel ===
The Flock is attacked by a group of bionic robots ("M-Geeks") at environmental awareness shows in Los Angeles and Mexico City. Later, the government enlists their help in finding out what is destroying hundreds of ships and killing millions of fish off the coast of Hawaii. Max's mother also goes missing. Max, Fang and the others make a submarine trip beneath the ocean, rescuing Max's mother and befriending undersea monsters.

=== Fang: A Maximum Ride Novel ===
The Flock travels to Africa where they meet Dr. Hans Gunther-Hagen, a former Itex worker, and Dylan, another human-avian hybrid designed to be Max's "perfect other half". Dylan joins the Flock, although they are all wary of his motives. Angel takes over the Flock, kicking out Max and Fang while claiming that they're too focused on their personal relationship. Fang is kidnapped by Dr. Hans and experimented on, and the Flock comes to rescue him. He dies for a moment before Max revives him. After getting back to their home, Fang decides to permanently leave the group and start his own Flock.

=== Angel: A Maximum Ride Novel ===
The Doomsday Group is brainwashing people, affecting Iggy and Max's half-sister Ella. Meanwhile, Fang starts his own gang which includes Max's clone, now called Maya. The two teams join forces in Paris to stop the Doomsday group. Their plan goes awry when Gazzy fails to disarm all the bombs under the gathering spot, and the bombs explode while Fang, Gazzy, and Angel are still in the blast radius. Fang and Gazzy make it out safely, but Angel is missing, leaving everyone heartbroken.

=== Nevermore: The Final Maximum Ride Adventure ===
Max and the remaining members of the Flock are attending a normal school, and Max is dating Dylan. Meanwhile, Fang's gang is attacked, some members betray them, and Maya is killed. Fang decides to return to the Flock. Together they learn of Angel's survival and rescue her from the lab where she's being held prisoner. Jeb Batchelder has returned trying to kill Fang, with help from a brainwashed Dylan. They fail, and Dr. Martinez leads the Flock to a remote island where they will be safe from the approaching apocalypse. However, instead of the plague they expect, the world is struck by a meteor. The Flock, along with the people on the island, survive and begin to rebuild.

This was initially marketed as the final book in the series, until the announcement of Maximum Ride Forever's release in 2015.

=== Maximum Ride Forever ===
The Flock struggles to survive after the decimation of the planet, with many of their loved ones having died or gone missing. They split up after a tragedy, and Max begins investigating a new enemy called the Remedy and his Horsemen who are working to kill off the remaining population. In a final battle of good and evil, the Flock reunites with an army to defeat the Remedy. Max and Fang have a daughter, Phoenix, and after sheltering during a five-year-long nuclear winter, settle in the ruins of Machu Picchu.

== Sequel series ==
The sequel series, Hawk, focuses on the adventures of Max's teenaged daughter in the new dystopian world.

=== Hawk ===
Max and Fang's teenage daughter, who now goes by the name Hawk, lives in the post-apocalyptic "City of the Dead." Having been lost as a small child, she knows nothing about her family until she encounters the Flock while searching for her kidnapped friends. They free Max from the prison where she's been kept, rally the people of the city and defeat the corrupt leaders.

=== City of the Dead ===
With the Flock away reforming the prison where Max was held, Hawk reluctantly serves on the Council trying to rebuild the City of the Dead for the better. A plague threatens the city, and mutants are blamed. Hawk goes to the forest to investigate, where she discovers a hidden base of hybrids. With her friend Moke captured and forced to use his new abilities, Hawk must rally help and work with her mother to defeat the threats.

== Characters ==
=== The Flock ===
- Maximum "Max" Ride is the title character and the primary protagonist of the series. She is an avian-human hybrid and the leader of the Flock, who begins the series as a 14-year-old. Max is half Hispanic, as revealed in Saving the World and Other Extreme Sports. Her powers include flying up to 350 miles per hour, breathing water, and hearing a Voice in her head which gives her advice. It is revealed in the third book that she is the daughter of Jeb Batchelder and Dr. Valencia Martinez, and thus the half-sister of Jeb's son Ari and Dr. Martinez's daughter Ella. A love triangle develops between Max, Fang, and Dylan, who was designed to be Max's "perfect other half". In Maximum Ride Forever, the teenaged Max gives birth to Phoenix, her daughter with Fang.
- Fang is second-in-command of the Flock and Max's best friend, later her boyfriend. He has dark hair and wings and has the abilities to virtually disappear, and the key to immortality in his DNA. He is somewhat reserved, but cares deeply about the Flock. He is usually very silent, and seems quite mysterious, always hiding his feelings. He runs a blog about the Flock's adventures. Fang and Max slowly fall in love over the course of the series, each growing jealous when the other encounters potential relationships. He splits from the Flock on several occasions after clashes with Max, but always returns. In Angel, he starts his own group of mutants and briefly dates Max's clone Maya, but reconciles with Max in Nevermore. Fang loses a wing and dies in Maximum Ride Forever, but is revived by Dylan. Fang and Max then have a baby girl named Phoenix.
- Iggy is a 14-year-old avian-human hybrid, six months younger than Max. His real name is revealed to be James Griffiths. Due to the whitecoats' experiments to enhance his night vision, Iggy is effectively blind, though he can sense colors by touch, see if his surroundings are white, and identify people by feeling their fingerprints. He is notably sarcastic, the best friend of the Gasman, and enjoys building bombs. In School's Out Forever, Iggy learns that he was kidnapped by the School when he was four months old. He finds his parents and decides to leave the Flock; however, he returns after learning that his parents were only interested in making money off his story. In Angel, Iggy is brainwashed by the Doomsday Group. He has a brief relationship with Max's half-sister Ella, ending with her death in Nevermore.
- Nudge is 11 years old and is African-American. Her real name is revealed to be Monique. She has the abilities of psychometry and attracting metal, and is a gifted hacker. She is extremely talkative and likes fashion. As the series goes on, she begins to long for normality. In MAX she talks about cutting her wings off, but Max convinces her not to.
- The Gasman, normally referred to by the nickname Gazzy, is 8 years old with blond hair and blue eyes. He is the biological brother of Angel, the only blood-related siblings of the Flock. He and Angel were sold to the School as babies by their parents. He has a mischievous nature, and he and Iggy are experts at constructing and setting off bombs and explosives. He is also adept at other types of engineering and inventing. He is called The Gasman because he has digestive issues and frequently passes gas. He is skilled at mimicry and ventriloquism, and later develops the ability to produce smelly clouds of gas.
- Angel is the youngest Flock member at 6 years old, with blue eyes and curly blonde hair. She gains numerous powers throughout the series, but her most prominent power is the ability to read and control minds. She is usually mistaken to be powerless and innocent, but she is truly extremely intelligent and dangerous. In Fang, Angel believes that she is the strongest of the Flock, and holds a vote, temporarily kicking Max out of the group. In Angel, she seems to have calmed some of the extreme changes in her personality that occurred in Fang and helps Max to balance her feelings for Fang and Dylan. She appears to be content with her role and no longer bids for power. In Nevermore, she reveals that she is the Voice in Max's head, although this revelation creates continuity problems. In Maximum Ride Forever, Angel takes on a prophet-like role after receiving visions of the Apocalypse and leads an army of survivors and mutants.
- Total is a black Cairn Terrier whom Angel saves from the Institute at the end of The Angel Experiment. His name is a reference to Toto from The Wizard of Oz. In School's Out Forever, Total reveals that he can speak. He has the ability to jump to great heights, and eventually grows his own tiny wings. He is often humorous and dramatic, loves culture such as theater and cuisine, and hates being treated like a normal dog. At the end of Fang, Total marries Akila, a normal Alaskan Malamute. Akila dies in Maximum Ride Forever. At some point Total gets married again. His daughter appears in HAWK.

=== Antagonists ===
- The School is a science facility in Death Valley that creates and experiments on human-animal hybrids and mutants. It is a branch of the worldwide corporation known as Itexicon or Itex, which has headquarters in Germany and is led by the Director, Marian Janssen.
- Jeb Batchelder is a scientist, or “whitecoat”, who works for the School that created the Flock. He broke the Flock out and took them to a safe house deep in the mountains, where he taught them survival and fighting skills before disappearing. In The Angel Experiment, he is revealed to still be alive and working again for the School. At first the Flock believes he's a traitor, but he is secretly working to help them overthrow Itex. In Saving the World and Other Extreme Sports, he is revealed to be Max's biological father and implies that he is also the Voice in her head; however, it is stated in the next book that he is not the Voice after all. In Nevermore, he turns completely against the Flock, clones Ari in an attempt to fix his old mistakes, and tries to kill Fang. In Maximum Ride Forever he has joined the Remedy and attempts to inject Max with the “upgrading” serum, but is killed by members of Fang's gang who came to rescue her. He contributed DNA to create Max and is also the father of Ari. He is an unreliable parent, using Max as a pawn and allowing Ari to be transformed into an Eraser, but he does love his children and grieves over Ari's death.
- Ari is Jeb's son, who was turned into an Eraser at the age of seven while Jeb was living with the Flock. Due to being mutated with wolf DNA after birth, he is always partially morphed, unlike the other Erasers who can shapeshift. He often leads the Erasers hunting the Flock. He both loves and resents Max, who got more of their father's attention. In Saving The World And Other Extreme Sports, as the other Erasers die and Ari's expiration date approaches, he reconciles with Max and joins the Flock. He goes with Max's side of the Flock to Europe to investigate Itex and helps them during the final battle, but his expiration date arrives mid-fight and he dies in Max's arms. In The Final Warning, the Flock attends his funeral. In MAX, the Flock's new enemy, Mr. Chu, creates an Ari lookalike robot in an attempt to frighten Max; it is destroyed in Iggy and Gazzy's explosion. In Nevermore, Jeb turns to cloning Ari in an attempt to bring him back. The failed clones, led by a successful copy, attempt to kill Fang but are defeated.
- The Erasers, created by the School in Death Valley, are half-human, half-wolf hybrids bred as guards and later sent to hunt down the members of the Flock. Their powers are superhuman strength, but they also eventually gain wings that are crudely grafted onto their shoulder blades. They have a life span of about 4 years to reach maturity and approximately a year or two to hunt the Flock. Jeb's son, Ari, who was turned into an Eraser at a very young age, is one of the last to die when Itex 'retires' all of the Erasers and replaces them with the Flyboys, robotic Erasers with synthetic skin. Erasers appear later in the series in Fang when Jeb clones Ari.
- Maya, originally known as Max II, is a clone of Max. She secretly replaces Max in a plot to destroy the Flock, but is immediately obvious due to her different personality and not knowing much about them. Max is supposed to fight her to the death, but refuses to kill her. She later changes her name and hairstyle to show that she is her own person. She joins Fang's new group, and he finds himself attracted to her. However, she is killed by Ari's clone and dies in Fang's arms.
- Anne is seemingly an FBI agent, who meets the Flock at a hospital where Fang is being treated. She offers them protection in exchange for a chance to study them in "non-painful, noninvasive" ways. Anne brings them to her country château and treats them with parental kindness and generosity. She also enrolls them in a private school. She offers to adopt them, making Max jealous, but when Erasers attack the school, it's revealed that Anne is actually Jeb's boss.
- Roland ter Borcht is a German geneticist with a thick accent who works for Itex. The Flock mocks him and refuses to cooperate with his experiments. He is mocked by the Gasman in Saving the world and other extreme sports as Gazzy says "I vill now desvroy the snnickers bars"
- The Director runs the School and Itex, and claims to be a hybrid human-Galápagos tortoise, 107 years old. She plots to kill half of the world's population and sell the Flock as living weapons. She also claims to be Max's mother, but this is disproven.
- Omega is a superhuman creation of Itex, considered their most successful experiment by the Director. He looks human but has superior speed, strength and senses. He has no free will. His only weakness is slow sight reactions and tracking. The Director forces Max to compete with Omega in several challenges to demonstrate Omega's superior skills, and then instructs them to fight to the death. In the final battle, Max defeats him but refuses to kill him.
- The Über-Director heads an unnamed company, possibly Itexicon (as his name implies he is the replacement for the Director.) He is composed of organs in glass cases connected by metal limbs (making him half-machine and half-human) and uses a wheelchair. It is implied that the Über-Director is one of the experiments Max saw when Ari gave her a tour of the school's experiments. Max calls him "the ÜD" to annoy him. In The Final Warning, he captures the Flock and auctions them. During the auction, a hurricane tears through the building, and the Über-Director is killed. He is the only person Max has ever killed; she justifies it with the claim that "(Über-Director) was a machine, someone's consciousness hooked up to a biomechanical body", and rarely dwells on it.
- Flyboys are the Erasers' robotic replacements. Flyboys are strong, fast and nimble both in the air and on the ground. Some have guns attached to their hands. However, they are slow-witted and easily destroyed by the Flock.
- Dr. Gunther-Hagen is a famous and charismatic German scientist who formerly worked for Itex. He created Dylan, who he intended as Max's perfect mate, and repeatedly tries to influence them to breed and start a new dynasty. He also has some special abilities such as instantly healing from illnesses and regenerating small extremities, such as fingers. In Maximum Ride Forever, a now aged Gunther-Hagen is revealed to be the evil mastermind known as the Remedy. He allowed the meteor to strike the earth in Nevermore and kill millions of people in an attempt to eradicate the genetically "imperfect," so he could populate the earth with his genetically "perfect" creations. He has built a large underground shelter in Russia known as Himmel and develops a serum known as "upgrading" which turns his subjects into genetically superior, brainwashed "Horsemen.” He uses his Horsemen to kill the imperfect mutants still living on earth, including the Flock. He desperately tries to kill Max and her unborn baby to keep her imperfect genes from spreading, but Max kills him by dropping him over the ocean.
- Mark is a member of the Doomsday Group, which attempts to blow up Paris. He is greedy, with a lust for power; in battle he is strong. Mark is defeated when Max and Maya unite to overcome him. He is presumed dead at the end of Angel when Max sees his body, but he appears again and dies in Nevermore.
- Pruitt is the children-hating principal of the school that Max and the Flock attend in Saving the World and Other Extreme Sports. While spying at recess, Iggy and Gazzy find files indicating that the school was formerly an insane asylum for the incurably ill. It is connected to the School. Pruitt later threatens Max with a taser and tries to catch them with scientists posing as teachers.
- Mr. Chu is an Asian man first appearing in MAX who tries to force the Flock to stop helping the environmental agency known as the CSM. He has an army of humanoid robots which the Flock calls M-Geeks. He kidnaps Dr. Valencia Martinez in an attempt to stop the CSM permanently. He is eventually revealed to be a lizard-like boy named Robert, wearing a realistic mask, who works for Dr. Gunther-Hagen.

=== Supporting characters ===
- Dr. Valencia Martinez is a Hispanic veterinarian who lives in Arizona. She gives Max medical attention after Max is shot rescuing her daughter Ella. Max is struck by her kindness and cleverness, and frequently returns to her for help. It is eventually revealed that Dr. Martinez once worked with the School and donated the egg that was used to create Max, only to be locked out of the process. She and Max are overjoyed to realize that they are mother and daughter. Dr. Martinez founds the CSM (Coalition to Stop the Madness), an environmental organization that the Flock often helps. In Nevermore, she seemingly betrays the Flock and works with Gunther-Hagen, but it's revealed she was brainwashed. She takes the Flock to a private island called Paradise to wait out the Apocalypse, just before a meteor strikes the earth. In Maximum Ride Forever, it is revealed that she and her daughter Ella died in the aftermath of the meteor strike.
- Ella is the daughter of Dr. Martinez. Ella has a crush on Iggy, which makes Max uncomfortable because she "feels like a mom to Iggy". In The Angel Experiment, Max stops to save Ella from a group of bullies, and is shot. She asks Ella for help and spends two days recuperating at Ella's house. In Saving the World and Other Extreme Sports, Ella is revealed to be Max's half-sister. Ella flirts with Iggy on a few occasions. In Angel, Ella is brainwashed by the Doomsday Group. Even after the Flock tries to deprogram her, she runs away, leaving the message "I was meant to have wings." At some point she is rescued by her mother and taken to the island of Paradise. In Maximum Ride Forever, it is revealed that Ella died.
- Akila is a Malamute with whom Total falls in love in The Final Warning. She is with the Flock when they are taken by Gozen to the Über-Director's auction when the hurricane kills the Über-Director. In MAX, Total muses about leaving the Flock to marry Akila. In the first epilogue of Fang, she and Total get married, with the Flock in attendance. She later dies in Maximum Ride Forever.
- Dr. Dwyer is a twenty-one-year-old scientist who works in Antarctica and escorts the Flock there. She is described with blonde or red hair at different points. Max is jealous of her friendship with Fang, despite their seven-year age difference. Fang seems to ignore Max when he is around Brigid, who is unaware of this tension (and of Max's feelings for Fang). Max also resents the fact that Fang writes about Brigid in his blog, but not about her. Max compares her with a redheaded student named Lisa whom Fang seemed attracted to in School's Out - Forever. At the end of MAX, Brigid interacts with Mr. Chu, which Max and her Voice find suspicious.
- Throughout the series, Max hears a mysterious Voice in her head which gives her cryptic advice. It has also sometimes given her visions. Jeb implies that he is the Voice in Saving the World and Other Extreme Sports, only to state in The Final Warning that he can only mimic it. Some other characters including Ari and Angel also receive advice from a Voice. At the end of Nevermore, Angel reveals that she is the Voice in Max's head.

=== Other mutants ===
- Dylan is an avian-human hybrid who joins the Flock in Fang. He is said to be Max's "perfect other half", programmed to love Max. His presence disrupts Max and Fang's romance. Dylan can heal himself almost instantly by placing his own saliva on his wounds and putting pressure on it. In addition, he has extremely good vision and clairvoyance. In Nevermore, Dylan goes on a violent rampage when Max chooses Fang over him, but reconciles with her by the end of the book and remains with the Flock after the apocalypse. In Maximum Ride Forever, Dylan is seemingly killed but in reality is kidnapped by the Remedy and turned into a Horseman. He retains his free will and fakes the Flock's death. He dies bringing Fang back to life, knowing that Max is in love with Fang.
- One of Fang's recruits for his own team in Angel, who has enhanced senses and was once in a gang.
- Fang's second recruit in Angel, Star is from an upper-class family. Her ability is super-speed. As a result, her body burns energy quickly and she must eat a lot to compensate. She and Ratchet often quarrel, with Kate (Star's friend from Catholic school) mediating. Star received her powers when she was abducted from a school field trip and subjected to experiments. She also demonstrates the ability to spin in a circle creating a high-pitched noise which can instantly de-hypnotize victims of the Doomsday group. In Nevermore, she is revealed to be a traitor on the Erasers' side.
- Kate is the third member of Fang's flock, whose powers include strength and quick reflexes. A pacifist and vegan, Kate breaks up fights between Ratchet and Star. She is an old friend of Star's; Ratchet flirts with her. In Nevermore, she is revealed to be a traitor on the Erasers' side. She and Star return in Maximum Ride Forever and help the heroes.
- The final recruit for Fang's Flock, Holden was experimented on and has scars on his arms . He can regrow limbs, heal quickly and breathe underwater. The other members (and Holden himself) call him "Starfish" because he has starfish DNA. He is 15 but looks more like a 10-year-old.
- Organizer of a Doomsday Group rally in Paris during Angel, Beth attempts to exert mind control on Fang and others through a television news channel, but the attempt fails when Ratchet changes the channel. Beth is described as "the Queen of the Doomsday Group" when she asserts herself against Mark, ordering him not to kill Max.
- Harry is a bird-kid whom Max meets in Maximum Ride Forever. He is described to be more bird than human, being completely covered by feathers (except his head), and able to fly perfectly and effortlessly. He can not talk, and when Max asks him, "Who are you?" he repeats, "Huryu"! When Max introduces herself as Maximum Ride, he introduces himself as Huryu, which Max changes to Harry. He becomes part of the flock and calls Max "Max Mum".

=== Characters in Sequel Series ===
- Hawk, born Phoenix, is the daughter of Max and Fang born during the events of Maximum Ride Forever. Like her parents, she is a human-avian hybrid with wings. She is only briefly spoken of in Maximum Ride Forever as she begins her first flying lessons with her family. As a child, she is separated from her parents and lost in the City of the Dead. Taking the name Hawk after her pet hawk Ridley, she grows up in the McCallum children's home alongside other mutants, with no memory of her family. Due to the constant need to protect the children at the orphanage, Hawk never learned how to fly very well; only needing to use her wings in desperate situations.
- Pietro Pater is Hawk's friend and love interest, son of the leader of one of the Six crime families.
- Calypso (birth name unknown) is a young girl around the age of eight, (in the present tense of the book Hawk) with no knowledge of her birth parents. She is a bug human-hybrid who was dropped off at the orphanage at the assumed age of three. She arrived at the McCallum children's home with a diaper and dirty teeshirt, with the text "Calypso" on the front; thus being dubbed by her fellow orphans as "Calypso." She has unusually big eyes and bug antennae protruding out of her back, which is most likely an outcome of her bug mutation, along with the ability of enhanced strength. She was also seen multiple times in the book of Hawk with the ability to see the future by a few minutes, leading to the belief that she has the ability of near-future vision. Her primary caretaker is Hawk.
- Rain (birth name unknown) is a preteen to early teenage girl around the age of 10–13. She is a mutant of some kind, yet it isn't specified what mutations she contains. She has splotches of melted-looking skin, implying she may have been affected by an acid storm.

== Reception ==
Maximum Ride: The Angel Experiment received generally positive reviews. The School Library Journal called the book an "exciting SF thriller that's not wholly original but still a compelling read". Booklist described it as "an action-packed cross between Gertrude Chandler Warner's Boxcar Children and Marvel Comics' X-Men. John Ritchie of the ALAN Review wrote a negative review, saying that Patterson "slips in his attempt to write an action-adventure series for kids". He called the book "filled with every possible comic book/Saturday morning cartoon cliche" and described Patterson's writing style as "uneasy" and Max's dialogue as "horribly fake". In January 2010, the webcomic Penny Arcade poked fun at James Patterson based on the description found on the back of the first book.

The second book, Maximum Ride: School's Out Forever, was criticized for being "disappointingly anticlimactic and violent," although Total's character was praised for being "sure to entertain." Booklist delivered a positive review, praising Patterson's "ability to write page-turning action scenes" and noting that he "leaven[ed] the suspense with some surprising humor." It also mentioned that fans of the first book would be "delighted" with the sequel. Erin Collazo Miller from About.com praised the "fast-paced" novel, "fun characters," and "interesting premise," but criticized the characters and plot lines for "lack of depth and development." The review said that "[a]fter 400+ pages, readers may wish they were a little farther into the plot and that more of their questions had been answered."

== Other works ==
=== OEL manga ===
Illustrated by Narae Lee and released by Yen Press, the first chapter of the original English-language manga adaptation came out in July 2008 in the magazine Yen Plus. A free 22-page preview was released on Free Comic Book Day (May 3, 2008). The first volume of the series was released on January 27, 2009, the second volume was released on October 27, 2009, the third volume was released on August 17, 2010, the fourth volume was released on April 26, 2011, the fifth volume was released on December 13, 2011, the sixth volume was released on December 11, 2012, the seventh volume was released on October 29, 2013, the eighth volume was released on July 29, 2014, and the ninth volume was released on November 17, 2015. It was on the "Top 25 Manga Properties" list in 2012. No new volumes have been released since 2015, leaving the series incomplete.

=== Film adaptation ===
Plans for a film were first announced in September 2007. However, the film entered development hell with the resignation of director Catherine Hardwicke in 2012 and the death of screenplay writer Don Payne in 2013. In 2014, the series was submitted for adaptation into a web series by Collective Digital Studio. The completed film, starring Allie Marie Evans as Max, was released on Digital HD on August 30, 2016. It adapted the first half of The Angel Experiment, and was rated poorly by fans and critics alike.

=== Marvel Comic series ===
The Marvel Comics adaption Max Ride: First Flight debuted on April 8, 2015. It featured the talents of Marguerite Bennett and Alex Sanchez. It was followed by Max Ride: Ultimate Flight beginning in November 2015, and Max Ride: Final Flight beginning in September 2016. Together, the comic series adapted the first three books of the novel series. There are significant differences from the books. For example, rather than avian wings, the characters have wings made of a metal alloy.
