= Maximum Ride: The Final Warning =

2008 novel by James Patterson

- The UK cover of Maximum Ride: The Final Warning.
- Author: James Patterson
- Language: English
- Series: Maximum Ride
- Genre: Young Adult Fiction
- Published: March 17, 2008 Little, Brown (US and UK)
- Publication place: United States
- Media type: Print (hardback & paperback)
- Pages: 380pgs (first edition, hardback); 288 (paperback)
- ISBN: 0-316-00286-0 (first edition, hardback)
- Preceded by: Saving the World and Other Extreme Sports
- Followed by: MAX: A Maximum Ride Novel

The Final Warning is the fourth novel in the Maximum Ride series by James Patterson. It was released in the US and in the UK on March 17, 2008.
