= Maximum Ride: School's Out Forever =

Sci-fi action-adventure series

- First UK edition cover of Maximum Ride: School's Out Forever.
- Author: James Patterson
- Cover artist: David Perry, Pete Turner & Rob Matheson
- Language: English
- Genre: Young adult, science fiction
- Publisher: Headline (UK); Little, Brown (U.S.)
- Publication date: May 23, 2006
- Publication place: United States
- Pages: 416 (hardback); 368 (paperback)
- ISBN: 0-316-15559-4
- Preceded by: Maximum Ride: The Angel Experiment
- Followed by: Maximum Ride: Saving the World and Other Extreme Sports

Maximum Ride: School's Out—Forever is the second book in the sci-fi action-adventure series Maximum Ride by James Patterson, published by Little, Brown. The book was released in the US and the UK on May 23, 2006. The series centers on the Flock, a group of six super-powered human-avian hybrids on the run from the scientists who created them.

== Plot ==
After the events of Maximum Ride: The Angel Experiment, the prior book, the Flock is headed toward Washington, D.C., where they hope to find the answers to their origins. However, after Fang is gravely injured by a flying Eraser and taken to a hospital, the Flock is housed by an FBI agent named Anne. The Flock enjoys a rare period of peace, even attending a private school. Life seems good, but this causes clashes between the Flock as Max has trouble trusting Anne. Suspicious things begin to happen around the school. The Flock continues to search for their biological parents and discovers Iggy's mother and father, who eagerly take him in. Things boil over at school in a fight where the teachers suddenly pull out tasers and chase Max, and Anne is revealed to be from the School and working with Jeb and the Erasers. Iggy returns, having discovered that his parents just wanted to make money off him once they saw his wings.

Angel suggests that they go to Florida, and for lack of a better plan, Max agrees. In Florida, the Flock learns that the School is part of a multi-national corporation named Itex that's plotting to destroy the world. Max is kidnapped and replaced by a clone; she escapes just in time to confront the clone who has led the Flock into a trap in Itex's Florida headquarters. Jeb tells them they must fight to the death, but Max refuses to destroy the clone. The Flock escapes once more.

== Reception ==
Maximum Ride: School's Out Forever received good reviews. Booklist delivered a positive review, praising Patterson's "ability to write page-turning action scenes" and noting that he "leaven[ed] the suspense with some surprising humor." It also mentioned that fans of the first book would be "delighted" with the sequel. Erin Collazo Miller from About.com praised the "fast-paced" novel, "fun characters," and "interesting premise."
