= Maximum Ride: The Angel Experiment =

2005 novel by James Patterson

- The first edition United States cover for The Angel Experiment
- Author: James Patterson
- Cover artist: Kamil Vojnar & Roger Wood
- Language: English
- Genre: Young adult fiction, science fiction
- Publisher: (United States) Little, Brown (United Kingdom) Headline
- Publication date: (United States) April 11, 2005 (United Kingdom) July 4, 2005
- Publication place: United States
- Pages: 432 pp (hardback); 413 (paperback)
- ISBN: 0-316-15556-X
- Followed by: Maximum Ride: School's Out Forever

Maximum Ride: The Angel Experiment is the first book in the Maximum Ride series by James Patterson. The book was released in the US on April 11, 2005, and in the UK on July 4, 2005. The story follows the Flock, a group of human-avian hybrids (98% human, 2% bird) on the run from the scientists who created them.

== Summary ==
The Flock, led by Maximum "Max" Ride, are a group of kids genetically altered to have wings. They live in hiding in a house in the woods after being freed by one of the scientists, Jeb Batchelder, now presumed deceased. The youngest member, Angel, is abducted by wolf-human hybrid "Erasers" and taken back to "The School", the lab where the Flock was created and raised in cages. Max, Fang and Nudge set out to rescue Angel while Iggy and the Gasman stay behind. On the way, Max stops to rescue a girl named Ella, but is shot in the shoulder. Ella's mom, a vet named Dr. Valencia Martinez, nurses her back to health and discovers a microchip implanted in her arm. Meanwhile, Iggy and the Gasman booby-trap their home and blow it up in a battle with the Erasers. Nudge and Fang follow up on a possible lead to Nudge's biological mother, but it turns out to be a trap by Ari, the Eraser leader. Ari appears physically mature, but is actually only seven years old, and resents the Flock. He is Jeb's son and feels that Jeb chose them over him.

The Flock reunites, but they are captured by Erasers and brought to the School. They meet Angel there and discover that Jeb is alive and working for the School. The Flock break out. Angel has gathered information about the Flock's biological parents, and Max has a sudden vision instructing her to go to the School's other location in New York, the Institute for Higher Living.

The Flock travels there, exploring the city while evading Erasers and living on the run. Max begins hearing a Voice in her head, giving her cryptic information and guiding her. It leads them to the institute, where they find a lab full of other experiments as well as more information on their parents. The Flock frees their fellow experiments and Angel adopts a genetically altered dog which she names Total. Max fights Ari again as they escape, and accidentally kills him. Jeb tells Max that she has killed her own brother. The Flock flies off, heading to Washington D.C. in search of their parents.

== Reception ==
Maximum Ride: The Angel Experiment has received generally positive reviews. Cleveland Plain Dealer described it as "like the best sort of video game or action movie, in book form" and said that it "shows the promise of becoming a favorite" as well as comparing it to the Boxcar Children series: "Think of this group of six, from 14-year-old Max to 6-year-old Angel, like the 'Boxcar Children' of a new millennium." The School Library Journal delivered a more indifferent review, calling the book an "exciting SF thriller that's not wholly original but still a compelling read". Booklist described it as "an action-packed cross between Gertrude Chandler Warner's Boxcar Children and Marvel Comics' X-Men", also noting how "Patterson occasionally forgets his audience here, as evidenced by his sardonic tone and such glib adult asides". However, Booklist also praised Patterson for stepping out of his normally adult-genre books as it said, "He's picked a comfortable formula (orphans protecting one another and making a home together)".

== Film adaptation ==
Plans for a film were first announced in January 2007, but it lingered in development for years with different directors and writers. The finished film, directed by Jay Martin, was released on Digital HD in August 2016 and followed the events of the first half of The Angel Experiment. It ends with the Flock escaping from the School with Angel, and leaves out the events in New York.
