= Maximum Ride: Saving the World and Other Extreme Sports =

2007 novel by James Patterson

- First UK edition cover of the book Maximum Ride: Saving the World and Other Extreme Sports.
- Author: James Patterson
- Cover artist: Lesley Robson-Foster, James Woodson, Peter Ginter
- Language: English
- Genre: Young Adult Fiction
- Publisher: (United Kingdom) Headline (United States) Little, Brown
- Publication date: May 29, 2007
- Publication place: United States
- Pages: 416 (hardback); 448 (paperback)
- ISBN: 0-316-15560-8
- Preceded by: Maximum Ride: School's Out Forever
- Followed by: Maximum Ride: The Final Warning

Maximum Ride: Saving the World and Other Extreme Sports is the third book in the Maximum Ride series by James Patterson. It was released in the United Kingdom and the United States on May 29, 2007. The series is set in modern times, and revolves around the 'flock', a group of human-avian hybrids on the run from the scientists who created them.

== Plot ==
In the third book of the Maximum Ride series, Max and her Flock are faced with the task of saving the world from a massive company called Itex, and its leader known as the Director. Itex - the company behind the School which experimented on the Flock - plans on cutting the world's population in half. They have already terminated a majority of their recombinant life forms. The wolf-human Erasers who once hunted the Flock have been replaced by robots called Flyboys.

Max wants to fight Itex, but Fang tries to convince her to stop and go live life somewhere isolated where they won't have to fight. She lets him take her to go look for a place to stay. They spend the night in a cave and Fang gently kisses Max.

Meanwhile, the rest of the Flock is captured from their hiding place and put in a truck. They notice that Angel is no longer with them. When Max and Fang return, they see the tire tracks and attempt to rescue the Flock. When they find the truck, though, they are captured too. Angel appears and tells them that she is no longer part of the Flock and is now helping Itex.

When they arrive at the School, Jeb tries to convince them that everything they've ever experienced was just a dream. The Flock is told that it's now time for them to be "retired" (killed). Ari, Jeb's son and the Flock's worst enemy, suddenly becomes kinder to Max. He is now the last of the Erasers. He shows Max his expiration date, a tattoo which appears on the back of Erasers' necks when they're going to die soon.

When the Flock is supposed to be retired, they break free with the help of Ari and Angel, who was only pretending to be on Itex's side in order to arrange an escape. Max brings Ari with them, angering Fang. The Flock spends the night in a cabin, where Max and Fang fight over Ari's presence. Unable to agree, they split the Flock.

Max, Nudge, Angel and Ari go to Europe to strike at the roots of Itex. Fang, Iggy, and Gazzy go to California in search of help, with Fang using his blog to rally supporters. At Itex's headquarters in Germany, Max and her flock are captured. They manage to send an email message to Fang. Angel uses her powers to influence the other mutant prisoners to riot and fight back, while followers of Fang's blog protest outside and break down the gates. Ari dies fighting alongside Max. It's revealed that Jeb is Max's father, and Dr. Martinez is her mother. With Itex defeated, the Flock reunites and sets out for their next adventure.

== Reception ==
The novel received Critical Acclaim, receiving nearly perfect ratings on most reading sites.
