= James Patterson =

American author (born 1947)

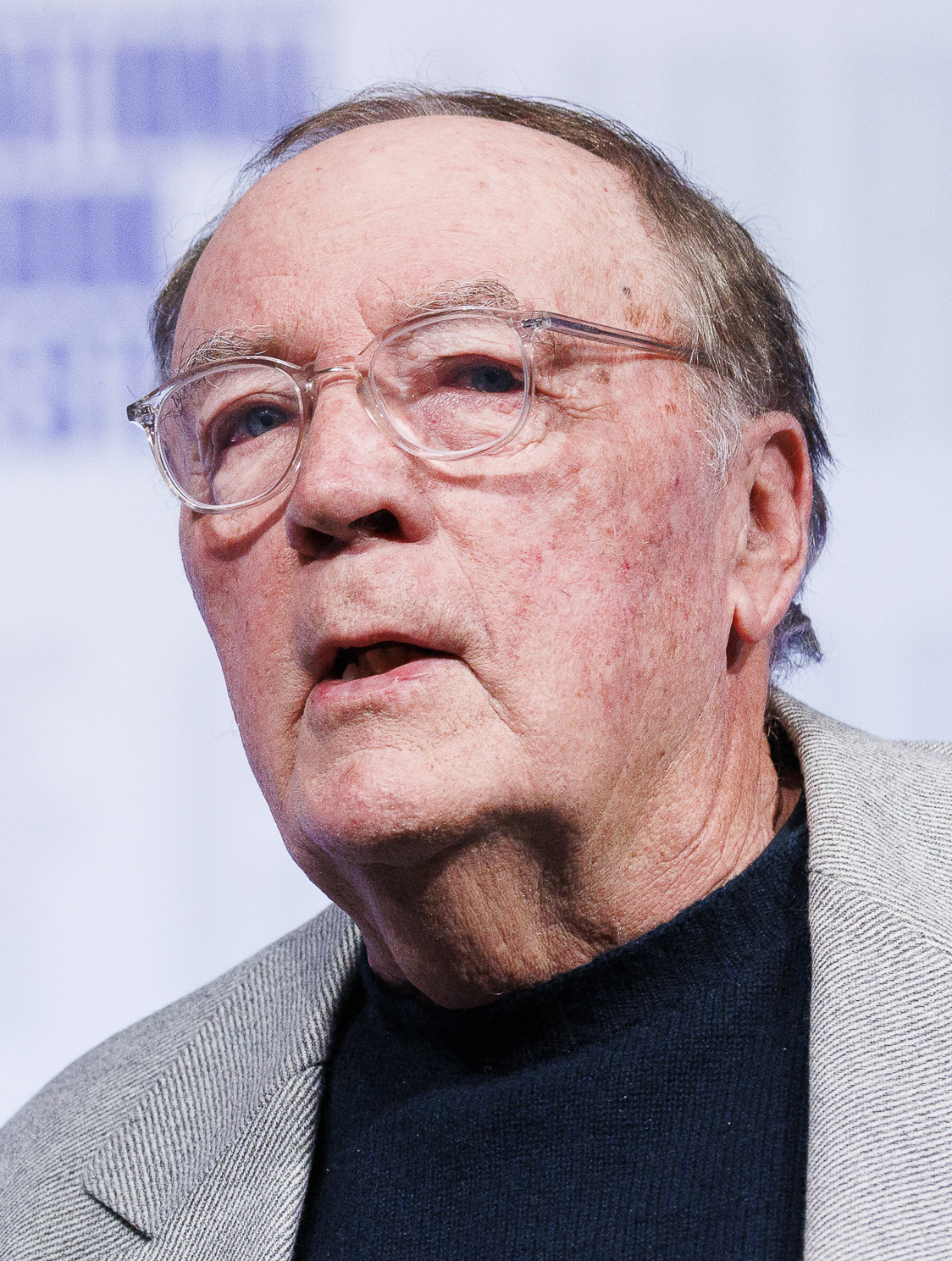
- Patterson in 2024
- Born: James Brendan Patterson; March 22, 1947 (age 79); Newburgh, New York, U.S.
- Education: Manhattan University (BA); Vanderbilt University (MA)
- Spouse: Susan Patterson (m. 1997)
- Children: 1
- Writing career
- Genres: Mystery, young adult fiction, thriller, comedy, realistic fiction, romance, science fiction, fantasy, coming of age
- Works: Bibliography
- Website: www.jamespatterson.com

James Brendan Patterson (born March 22, 1947) is an American author. Among his works are the Alex Cross, Michael Bennett, Women's Murder Club, Maximum Ride, Daniel X, NYPD Red, Witch & Wizard, Private and Middle School series, as well as many stand-alone thrillers, non-fiction, and romance novels. Patterson's books have sold more than 425 million copies, and he was the first person to sell one million e-books. In 2016, Patterson topped Forbes's list of highest-paid authors for the third consecutive year, with an income of $95 million. His total income over a decade is estimated at $700 million. Many of his stories are written in collaboration with other authors, where Patterson provides the story and the other author largely writes the book, which has led to Patterson being described as being as much a "brand" as an author.

In November 2015, Patterson received the Literarian Award from the National Book Foundation. He has donated millions of dollars in grants and scholarship to various universities, teachers' colleges, independent bookstores, school libraries, and college students to promote literacy.

== Early life ==
James Patterson was born on March 22, 1947, in Newburgh, New York, the son of Isabelle (née Morris), a homemaker and teacher, and Charles Patterson, an insurance broker. The family was working-class and of Irish descent. Patterson graduated summa cum laude with a B.A. in English from Manhattan University and with an M.A. in English from Vanderbilt University.

== Career ==
Patterson was a PhD candidate at Vanderbilt when he took a job as an advertising executive at J. Walter Thompson. After Patterson retired from advertising in 1996, he devoted his time to writing and has written more than 200 novels. Patterson later said that his greatest influence was probably Evan S. Connell's 1959 debut novel Mrs. Bridge. In 1976, Patterson published his first novel, The Thomas Berryman Number. The novels featuring his character Alex Cross, a forensic psychologist formerly of the Washington D.C. Metropolitan Police and Federal Bureau of Investigation who now works as a private psychologist and government consultant, are his most popular and the top-selling U.S. detective series of the 2010s. Patterson has written more than 200 novels since 1976. Patterson has had more than 114 New York Times bestselling novels, and holds The New York Times record for most #1 New York Times bestsellers by a single author – 67 – which is also a Guinness World Record. His novels account for one in 17, roughly 6%, of all hardcover novels sold in the United States; as of 2010, Patterson's novels had in recent years sold more copies than those of Stephen King, John Grisham, and Dan Brown combined. His books have sold approximately 305 million copies worldwide. In 2008, Patterson replaced Jacqueline Wilson as the most borrowed author in Britain's libraries. He retained this position at least until 2013. In 2018, Patterson worked with Stephen David Entertainment on the true crime television series James Patterson's Murder Is Forever.

Patterson's awards include the Edgar Award, the BCA Mystery Guild's Thriller of the Year, the International Thriller of the Year award, and the Children's Choice Book Award for Author of the Year. He is the first author to have No. 1 new titles simultaneously on The New York Times adult and children's bestsellers lists, and to have two books on NovelTrackr's top-ten list at the same time. In 2019, Patterson was awarded a National Humanities Medal. He appeared on the Fox TV show The Simpsons (in the episode "Yokel Chords") and in various episodes of Castle as himself.

Patterson works with a variety of co-authors, such as J.D. Barker, Candice Fox, Maxine Paetro, Andrew Gross, Mark Sullivan, Ashwin Sanghi, Michael Ledwidge, and Peter de Jonge. In May 2017, it was announced that Patterson would also co-author a crime fiction book with former U.S. President Bill Clinton. Patterson said the novel, The President Is Missing, would provide a level of detail that only a former U.S. president can offer. Patterson has often said that collaborating with others brings new and interesting ideas to his stories. Of his process, Patterson has said that he is simply more proficient at dreaming up plots than crafting sentence after sentence.

In September 2009, Patterson signed a deal to write or co-write 11 books for adults and six for young adults by the end of 2012. Forbes reported the deal was worth at least $150 million, but according to Patterson, the estimate was inaccurate.

Patterson founded the James Patterson PageTurner Awards in 2005 to donate over $100,000 that year to people, companies, schools, and other institutions that find original and effective ways to spread the excitement of books and reading. The PageTurner Awards were put on hold in 2008 to focus on Patterson's new initiative, ReadKiddoRead.com, which assists parents, teachers, and librarians in finding books for their children. The social networking site for ReadKiddoRead is hosted by Ning. The website is inspired by methods Patterson used with his own son, Jack, who had been a reluctant reader. Patterson has also set up the James Patterson Teacher Education Scholarship in the schools of education at Appalachian State University, Michigan State University, Florida Atlantic University, and the University of Florida. Patterson also ran the College Book Bucks scholarship program. In 2020, his JP Entertainment company signed a first-look deal with Entertainment One.

In June 2022, Patterson apologized on Facebook for his accusations of racism after saying in an interview that older white males find it difficult to find work in film, theater, television and publishing, and that the problem is "just another form of racism". Patterson's publishing house, Hachette, has a workforce that is 65% white and 78% of senior positions are filled by white people. Following publication of data confirming that white males are overrepresented in the publishing field, Patterson said: "I apologize for saying white male writers having trouble finding work is a form of racism. I absolutely do not believe that racism is practiced against white writers. Please know that I strongly support a diversity of voices being heard—in literature, in Hollywood, everywhere."

In March 2023, Patterson signed an exclusive first-look deal with Skydance Television.

== Reception ==
Because Patterson co-authors many of his books, he has faced criticism for allowing his likeness to be used as a brand to make money.

In an interview for USA Weekend, Stephen King said Patterson was "a terrible writer but he's very successful". King also implied, when asked on The Late Show with Stephen Colbert about how many hours it takes him to write a book, that Patterson needed only 12 hours for two books, noting he and Patterson had "a mutual respect—sort of". Patterson said of King in a Wall Street Journal interview: "He's taken shots at me for years. It's fine, but my approach is to do the opposite with him—to heap praise."

Legal thriller writer Lisa Scottoline said in a review of Patterson's Kill Alex Cross: "They used to say that 50 million Elvis Presley fans couldn't be wrong, and James Patterson makes 50 million fans look like a good start. He has sold more than 230 million books, and his fans aren't wrong, either."

In 2013, Patterson took out ads titled "Who Will Save Our Books? Our Bookstores? Our Libraries?" in Publishers Weekly and The New York Times Book Review, which employed the text: "If there are no book-stores, no libraries, no serious publishers with passionate, dedicated, idealistic editors, what will happen to our literature? Who will discover and mentor new writers? Who will publish our important books? What will happen if there are no more books like these?" Patterson called the ads an attempt to "stir the pot a little bit". Digital Book World called the ads "refreshing, really. And brave." Maureen Sullivan, president of the American Library Association, told the Tampa Bay Times she was writing Patterson a thank-you letter.

In 2017, digital humanities scholars Simon Fuller and James O'Sullivan published research showing that Patterson does not do much actual writing when collaborating with other authors. O'Sullivan writes: "Patterson is all about story... 'author', in its widely accepted sense, isn't always the most appropriate term for his role within the writing process." O'Sullivan later conducted the same analysis on The President Is Missing, a collaboration between Patterson and Bill Clinton. O'Sullivan concludes that Patterson did most of the writing, aside from the end of the novel.

=== Book banning ===
In March 2023, Patterson's Maximum Ride series were banned from two elementary school libraries in Florida's Martin County School District and placed in their middle school libraries. Patterson criticized the move, calling it a "borderline absurd decision". He encouraged readers to "send a polite note" to Florida Governor Ron DeSantis in response to legislation passed to seek community input on school library materials.

== Personal life ==
Patterson and his wife, Susan, live in Palm Beach, Florida. They have a son, who was born on February 8, 1998.

In 2015, Patterson established the James Patterson Pledge with Scholastic Book Clubs to provide books to young readers.

== Awards ==
Year	Award	Category	Result
2007	International Thriller Writers Awards	"Thrillermaster" Award	Won
2015	National Book Award	Literarian Award for Outstanding Service award	Won
2015	Los Angeles Times Book Prize	Innovator's Award	Won
2019	National Humanities Medal		Won
2019	New York State Writers Hall of Fame	Class of 2019	Won
2025	International Thriller Writers Awards	Silver Bullet Award	Won

Work	Year & Award	Category	Result	Ref.
The Thomas Berryman Number	1977 Edgar Allan Poe Award for Best First Novel		Won	
Sam's Letters to Jennifer	2005 Audie Awards	Romance	Nominated	
Maximum Ride: School's Out Forever	2008 Hampshire Book Awards	Book Award	Nominated	
Maximum Ride: The Angel Experiment	2008-2009 South Dakota Library Association	SD Teen Choice Book Awards	MS Winner	
Maximum Ride: The Angel Experiment	2007-2008 Soaring Eagle Book Award		Nominated	
Maximum Ride: Saving the World and Other Extreme Sports	2008 Buckeye Children's & Teen Book Award		Nominated	
The 8th Confession (with Maxine Paetro)	2009 Goodreads Choice Awards	Mystery & Thriller	Nominated	
Maximum Ride: The Final Warning	2009 Kids' Book Choice Awards	Author of the Year	Finalist	
Maximum Ride: MAX	2011 Buckeye Children's & Teen Book Award		Nominated	
Now You See Her (with Michael Ledwidge)	2011 Goodreads Choice Awards	Mystery & Thriller	Nominated	
Fang: A Maximum Ride Novel	2011 Children's Choice Book Awards	Teen Choice Book of the Year	Nominated	
Women's Murder Club: 11th Hour (with Maxine Paetro)	2012 Goodreads Choice Awards	Mystery & Thriller	Nominated	
Guilty Wives (with David Ellis)	2012 Goodreads Choice Awards	Mystery & Thriller	Nominated	
Middle School: The Worst Years of My Life (with Chris Tebbetts)	2012-2013 Soaring Eagle Book Award		Nominated	
Middle School: The Worst Years of My Life (with Chris Tebbetts)	2012 Kids' Book Choice Awards	Author of the Year	Finalist	
First Love (with Emily Raymond)	2015 Audie Awards	Romance	Nominated	
Cross Justice	2017 Audie Awards	Thriller or Suspense	Won	
The President is Missing (with Bill Clinton)	2018 Goodreads Choice Awards	Mystery & Thriller	Nominated	
All-American Murder: The Rise and Fall of Aaron Hernandez, the Superstar Whose Life Ended on Murderers' Row (with Alex Abramovich and Mike Harvkey)	2018 Goodreads Choice Awards	Non-Fiction	Nominated	
Word of Mouse (with Chris Grabenstein)	2019 Children's Literature Association of Utah Bee Hive Book Awards	Children's Fiction	Nominated	
Along Came a Spider: 25th Anniversary Edition	2020 Audie Awards	Mystery	Nominated	
The House of Kennedy (with Cynthia Fagen)	2020 Goodreads Choice Awards	History & Biography	Nominated	
Ali Cross	2020 Goodreads Choice Awards	Middle Grade & Children's	Nominated	
Ali Cross	2023-2024 Indian Paintbrush Book Award		Third Place	
Walk in My Combat Boots (with Matt Eversmann & Chris Mooney)	2021 Goodreads Choice Awards	History & Biography	Nominated	
Best Nerds Forever (with Chris Grabenstein)	2021 Goodreads Choice Awards	Middle Grade & Children's	Nominated	
Becoming Muhammad Ali (with Kwame Alexander)	2022 Mangolia Book Awards	Grades 3–5	Won	
Becoming Muhammad Ali (with Kwame Alexander)	2023 Grand Canyon Reader Award		Won	
Becoming Muhammad Ali (with Kwame Alexander)	2023 South Dakota Children's Book Awards		Won	
The House of Wolves (with Mike Lupica)	2024 International Thriller Writers Awards	Audiobook	Nominated	

== Adaptations ==
=== Film ===
- Kiss the Girls (1997), film directed by Gary Fleder, based on novel Kiss the Girls
- Along Came a Spider (2001), film directed by Lee Tamahori, based on novel Along Came a Spider
- Alex Cross (2012), film directed by Rob Cohen, based on novel Cross, or Alex Cross
- Maximum Ride (2016), film directed by Jay Martin, based on novels of Maximum Ride series
- Middle School: The Worst Years of My Life (2016), film directed by Steve Carr, based on children's novel Middle School: The Worst Years of My Life
- The Postcard Killings (2020), film directed by Danis Tanović, based on novel The Postcard Killers

=== Television ===
- Child of Darkness, Child of Light (1991), telefilm directed by Marina Sargenti, based on novel Virgin, or Cradle and All
- Miracle on the 17th Green (1999), telefilm directed by Michael Switzer, based on novel Miracle on the 17th Green
- First to Die (2003), telefilm directed by Russell Mulcahy, based on novel 1st to Die
- Suzanne's Diary for Nicholas (2005), telefilm directed by Richard Friedenberg, based on novel Suzanne's Diary for Nicholas
- Women's Murder Club (2007–2008), series created by Elizabeth Craft and Sarah Fain, based on novels of Women's Murder Club series
- Sundays at Tiffany's (2010), telefilm directed by Mark Piznarski, based on novel Sundays at Tiffany's
- Zoo (2015–2017), series based on novel Zoo
- James Patterson's the Chef (2018), miniseries directed by Nico Casavecchia and Gabe Michael, based on novel The Chef
- Instinct (2018–2019), series created by Michael Rauch, based on novel Murder Games, or Instinct
- Jeffrey Epstein: Filthy Rich (2020), miniseries co-written by John Connolly and Tim Malloy and based on Filthy Rich
- Cross (2024)
- One Night in Idaho: The College Murders (2025)

== Filmography ==
=== Television ===
Year	Title	Role	Notes
2009–2010	Castle	Himself	Episodes: "Flowers For Your Grave", "A Deadly Game"
