= Twesten =

Twesten is a surname. Notable people with the surname include:

- August Detlev Christian Twesten (1789–1876), German Lutheran theologian
- Elke Twesten (born 1963), German politician
- Karl Twesten (1820–1870), German politician and author

== See also ==
- Westen
