= Burn Notice season 7 =

Burn Notice
- Season 7
- DVD cover
- No. of episodes: 13

Release
- Original network: USA Network
- Original release: June 6 – September 12, 2013

Season chronology
- ← Previous; Season 6

The seventh and final season of the American television spy drama Burn Notice aired from June 6, 2013 to September 12, 2013, on the cable television channel USA Network. The 13-episode season was ordered by USA Network on November 7, 2012. In May 2013, the network announced that this season will be the show's last. Production on the series wrapped on July 31, 2013.

== Season overview ==
After making the deal to get his friend and his mother released from prison, Michael is once again working for the CIA, this time under his new handler, Andrew Strong (Jack Coleman). Operating deep undercover in the Dominican Republic, a bearded Michael spends nine months posing as an alcoholic ex-spy, committing the occasional crime to pay the rent in order to attract his target and old friend, Randall Burke (Adrian Pasdar), who is suspected to be the leader of a terrorist network. After Burke watches him for six months, he finally approaches Michael with a potential job opportunity. To sell his cover, Michael acts desperate for a job, but Burke is hesitant and tells Michael to take care of himself. After meeting with Strong at a baseball game to update him about his meeting with Burke, Strong reminds Michael of their deal; in return for Strong saving his friends and mother from life in prison, Michael has to take Burke down. Later that night, Burke and his associate, Pablo visit Michael and agrees to give him a job under one condition; Michael quits drinking or else he gets a bullet in the back of his head. He also tells Michael that he's not just offering him a new job, he's offering him a new life and in this life, there are no second chances.

Meanwhile, Sam, Jesse, Fiona, and Madeline are back in Miami, living their lives without Michael. Sam is back with Elsa (Jennifer Taylor), Jesse is back at his private security firm, Fiona is bounty hunting with her new boyfriend, Carlos Cruz (Stephen Martines), and Madeline has quit smoking to try to get custody of Nate's son, Charlie since Ruth is in rehab. They come together again when a mysterious man using different cover IDs (Nick E. Tarabay) begins asking around about Michael. He finally succeeds when he pretends to be a child custody specialist to trick Madeline into revealing that Michael is working on a government assignment after making a deal with the CIA to get them all released from prison. When Fiona asks what Madeline told him about Michael, Madeline is horrified that she accidentally put Michael in danger.

Meanwhile, after Michael and Pablo complete a job for Burke which was to blow up a bunch of satellite equipment in a security firm, Pablo gets a call from the mystery man in Miami and learns that Michael is still working for the CIA. To preserve his cover, Michael floors it through the police checkpoint, leading to the cops shooting them and the car flips over, killing Pablo. That night, Michael lies to Burke about the reason Pablo was killed, claiming that Pablo panicked and Michael was trying to get them out of there. Burke says they lost a hero and their mission continues because of what he did. Burke decides to lie low for a few days and tells Michael to stay strong and be ready. The next day, Michael meets with Strong and asks about his cover. Strong informs him that someone's been asking about him in Miami. Michael reveals that the Miami contact was Pablo's, not Burke's and he won't sit on this secret forever.

Michael returns to Miami with Strong and the CIA but is forbidden from contacting his friends, although the CIA arranges for Michael to have a private meeting with his mother, Madeline to get her to stop asking about him. Afterwards, Michael meets with Strong and begins spying on his friends, who are tracking the mystery man, identified as Dexter Gamble. As Michael spies on them, he remembers his time in Ireland with Fiona back when they first met. As Strong, Michael, and the CIA monitor their investigation, Gamble kidnaps Fiona. Michael is angry with Strong and blames him, but Strong insists the only way to save Fiona is to finish the job. Strong gets in contact with a Special Response Team and wants Michael to give them more information about Gamble, but gets angry when he notices that Michael took off. Michael chases after Sam, Jesse, and Carlos to stop them from meeting with Gamble since their plan was too risky. Strong then finds Michael and yells at him for going off the reservation, but Michael has a way to salvage their operation, save Fiona, and kill Gamble.

Michael then gets in contact with Gamble as the CIA and SRT operatives are in place. Gamble demands $1,000,000 divided into five different currencies, a fueled-up jet, a Canadian passport, and a clear path out of Miami. Michael agrees to the deal but wants to talk to Fiona. Gamble refuses, so Michael refuses his deal and begins to walk away. Gamble stops him and lets him talk to Fiona for ten seconds, giving Michael time to say "It's time to be brave, little angel", which gives Fiona the signal to get down and gives the CIA and the SRT the signal to kill Gamble. After Fiona is rescued, Strong praises Michael for his plan working and tells him they should get back to the Dominican Republic to finish their mission. Michael then talks to Sam and Jesse, apologizing to them for spying on them and for not contacting them. Sam says they're just glad he's okay and offers their help whenever he needs it. Michael then talks to Fiona, who's touched he remembered their story but then kisses his cheek and says "Take care", letting him know it's over.

Michael returns to the Dominican Republic and upon seeing a sketch of his face on the news, he shaves off his beard and meets with Burke, who tells him that they're about to meet a guy who's going to help them steal a truck. Michael offers to bring in his people from Miami, but Burke turns him down. However, after Burke's guy demands $12.5 million instead of $5,000, Burke kills him and has Michael tell him about his guys in Miami. Michael then meets with Strong to request bringing in Sam and Jesse. Strong initially refuses and wants to use his operatives, but then agrees after Michael points out that Strong's people will wash up on the beach next to his dead body. Strong warns Michael there can be no mistakes and Michael promises that Sam and Jesse will be fine.

As Fiona helps Madeline deal with one of Nate's old bookies in Miami, Sam and Jesse fly down to the Dominican Republic on a dark plane, but after getting off the plane, Michael sets it on fire to prevent the cops from chasing them because the Dominican authorities believed it was a drug plane. After Jesse comes up with a plan to steal the truck and make a smaller mess, Burke wants them to use a sniper rifle to kill the guards if anything goes wrong. In private, Sam and Jesse tell Michael that they don't want to kill any random guards, so Michael finally reveals that the deal he made with Strong wasn't just to work for the CIA, it was to get close to Burke and take him down; if he fails, then they all go back to the CIA detention center for good. Michael, Sam, Jesse, and Burke make a play to steal the truck, but Sam is forced to shoot a guard to protect Michael, leaving him feeling guilty. As Michael and Burke prepare to make a deal with Rafael Serrano, Strong orders Sam and Jesse to go back to Miami. They refuse, so Strong agrees to let them stay and watch them take Burke and Serrano down.

As Michael and Burke meet with Serrano, Strong and the CIA operatives are in place. Serrano is excited about their deal, but Burke kills Serrano's guards, revealing that he just wants Serrano because he has valuable information for the people he works for, shocking Sam, Jesse, and Strong since the CIA believed Burke was the leader. When Burke's helicopter pilot spots the CIA operatives and informs him, Burke initially suspects Serrano until Serrano explains that he was just there to make a deal and didn't get the location until 40 minutes ago. Burke then suspects that Michael betrayed him and turns his gun on him. Michael continuously denies it and claims that Serrano is lying. Sam shoots at Michael to help him preserve his cover, so Michael orders Serrano to call them off or he'll snap his neck right there. Burke orders Serrano to do it, so Serrano calls for the team to fall back. Reluctantly, Strong tells his operatives to stand down as Burke torches the truck and has Michael bring Serrano to the helicopter. After they escape, Burke apologizes to Michael, but Michael confronts him about having a boss and demands answers. Burke says he can't give Michael the answers he deserves but Michael's on a path and all will be revealed in time.

Some time later, Burke orders Michael to find Serrano's daughter and acknowledges that he knows Michael doesn't like this job, but Serrano hasn't given him much of a choice. Michael finds Serrano's daughter asleep and aims a gun at her, while Burke tries to get Serrano to talk. Serrano finally spills what he knows; the woman he's looking for is in Cuba. Burke assures Serrano that they're not going to kill his daughter, to Michael's relief. Michael talks to Strong about the mission getting out of control and is upset that Burke almost had him kill a child, but Strong reminds Michael that he's not the only one on the line if the mission goes south. Burke has Michael bring Sam and Jesse to Cuba to help find a woman named Sonya Lebedenko (Alona Tal) and rescue her from the Russians. Michael calls Fiona for help and after he apologizes for making a promise to her and then breaking his promise, she agrees to help him frame a GRU agent for spying for the Americans. As she and Madeline kidnap the GRU agent, Michael goes into a Russian black site with a bug to warn them that the CIA is about to raid them. The Russians torture Michael with water but Michael claims that they have a traitor among them as Burke, Jesse, and Sam stage a CIA room with destroyed equipment and computers. The plan almost works to move Sonya, but the boss learns that their security is doubled, so he calls Michael a new friend of Moscow. Burke decides to go in and pose as Michael's CIA contact, claiming that he has computer codes they want. After talking to Michael alone for a few minutes, Burke tells him that Sonya is the key to everything and it's been an honor working with him.

Burke then sacrifices himself and reveals a bomb, killing himself and the Russian boss. Michael grabs Sonya and they escape with Sam and Jesse. Once they get to the forest, they look for a way out, but Sonya knocks Jesse out and disappears, so they scout the perimeter to find her. Sonya jumps down behind Michael and orders him to drop his gun. Michael tells Sonya he's on her side, but she says she knows who he is. Michael claims that he no longer works for the CIA; he was working with Burke. After gaining her trust, they, along with Sam and Jesse work to find a way out of Cuba, but Michael and Sonya become targets of a Russian manhunt, so Sam and Jesse pose as bounty hunters to throw them off the trail, and they all manage to hijack a plane and head back to Miami, where Sonya gets a call and learns that a hacker syndicate group exposed her identity, so they're going to destroy them. Meanwhile, Strong blackmails Fiona into helping Michael with his mission to take down the terrorist network, even going so far as to have her arrested. Although Fiona believes that Michael's deal with Strong was to get his job back, Strong reveals to Fiona that his deal with Michael is mission specific and they will all go back to prison if he fails to take down the terrorist network, shocking Fiona, so she reluctantly agrees to help but makes it clear that when the mission is done, she wants out. Strong then has Fiona released from jail.

After going for a run, Michael meets with Strong in a park and Strong is excited that their operation has been put on a whole new level due to rescuing Sonya from Cuba. After Michael updates Strong about meeting her at a restaurant and taking down a hacker syndicate, Strong informs Michael that he's arranged for Fiona to help him. Michael isn't happy since he promised Fiona he wouldn't involve her, but Strong refuses to budge on his decision.

At a restaurant, Michael and Sonya pose as a married couple when a man suddenly has a seizure, so Michael poses as a doctor to help him while Sonya steals a thumb drive from his jacket pocket. Later, Fiona meets with Michael at the loft, and Michael is happy to see her, but Sonya comes out and meets Fiona, who's taken aback. Once they head inside, they, along with Sam and Jesse, come up with a plan to destroy the hacker syndicate called "The Collective". Michael wants to go in posing as a hacker, which isn't the best idea, so they suggest enlisting help from Barry Burkowski (Paul Tei). Unfortunately, Barry is holding a grudge against the team for getting him sent to prison last year, but Sam and Jesse smooth things over with him by offering to help him find his girlfriend, so he agrees to help. As Sam and Jesse help Barry, Michael and Fiona pose as hackers and are hired at "The Collective", giving them the opportunity to head to the roof, repel down and drill a hole through a wall so they could attach a device to hijack the security camera's feed. After Fiona's rope breaks, Michael saves her, reminding them of all their memories when they were close. After Fiona entices an employee named Cody away from the office, Michael goes down to the mainframe as the cameras are temporarily hijacked. The big boss, Jack Frakes (Charles Mesure), however, catches him, so he forces Michael to get back to work and let him see if Michael's as good as he claims he is. Meanwhile, Sam and Jesse pose as detectives and manipulate Cody into planting the thumb drive, containing a virus to destroy them, so Frakes kills him.

After "The Collective" is destroyed and after helping Barry, the team apologize to him and he forgives them. Later that night, Michael asks Sonya for a seat at the table since he's worked for them long enough. After Sonya tells him he'd have to give up everything, Michael breaks down and screams that he has nothing. Michael cries that his friends moved on without him, his brother is dead and his mother would never forgive him for getting him killed. After Michael tells Sonya that she's the only thing he has left, she says that's something they have in common, so he kisses her, leading to them sleeping together. The next morning, Sonya agrees to make the call. Later, Michael has Fiona meet him and reveals that he slept with Sonya, so she warns him he's playing with fire.

At the loft, after Michael writes down everything about his life and career, Sonya tases him, and he is taken to her boss at a mansion. Michael is interrogated, tortured and drugged continuously for a few days as Sam, Fiona, and Jesse monitor Sonya, who's working with a few operatives to incinerate Michael's stuff. While being interrogated by the leader of the terrorist network, Michael is forced to face his inner demons, even hallucinating Larry Sizemore (Tim Matheson), revealing that he blew up a building with people inside to make sure his target was dead. The leader asks if he's a part of anything else, so Michael hallucinates his father, who slaps him around because of everything he sacrificed for the CIA. Michael ends up in a room where Sonya finds him, asking him what he told the leader. Disoriented and confused, Michael says he doesn't remember, so Sonya reveals that the leader knows he betrayed them so they have to go. Sonya gets Michael out of the compound, but after collapsing and hallucinating his younger self, Michael wakes up and goes back to the leader, who holds him at gunpoint, saying that he lied to him and betrayed him. Michael tells him that he won't pull the trigger because he's there and he's got nothing to hide. The leader is impressed and Sonya tells him Michael's a keeper, so the leader introduces himself as James (John Pyper-Ferguson) and welcomes him to "the family".

Later, Michael is taken to Madeline's house, where he's sleeping off the drugs. Jesse explains to Sam that his brain is still scrambled from the drugs and when Fiona tried talking to him, he took one look at her and started crying, couldn't stop. Sam reveals that he went to the house where James held Michael, only to see that it has been destroyed. Michael wakes up a few hours later and sees Madeline is sitting by his side. Michael reveals to her that he saw his dad and realized that he's the only reason he survived.

Some time later, Michael makes plans to meet with James at a restaurant as Strong and the CIA are in place, but Michael is given a phone and is forced to run to a car, so Strong has his people follow Michael without getting too close. However, Michael makes it to the car and is taken to another safe house, where James greets him. James reveals that his purpose is to destroy monsters, which is why he created his network so while the CIA questions threats, he eliminates them. James tasks Michael with returning to the Dominican Republic to take down Marco Cabral, a drug smuggler who is set to have a comfortable retirement in England after making a deal with the MI6. Michael agrees to take the job, especially after learning from James that Burke was working on taking him down and felt that he would want him to finish the job.

Michael returns to the Dominican Republic with Sam, who's initially reluctant to do this job. However, after learning from Michael that Cabral is a drug smuggler and promising that he's a means to an end, Sam agrees to help. Michael and Sam work to convince Cabral that he should accompany them by making him think he can't trust the MI6. As they work the job, Sam grows concerned about Michael since James is getting to him as well as the CIA, especially since Michael has been working on this job for almost a year. After Michael tells Sam that he needs him and he doesn't think he can do this alone, Sam promises that he doesn't have to. Their plan to get Cabral almost works until they learn that Cabral picks up on the fact that they're trying to separate him from his men, so they kidnap him and find a way to get past the cops. After delivering Cabral to James and his men, James informs Michael and Sam that they won't be coming with and gives them fake names and passports to return to Miami.

Meanwhile, Jesse and Fiona join Strong in Biloxi to find a mental patient (currently known as "John Doe") whose bills James has been paying for quite some time. They believe he's a threat, especially when he kidnaps Jesse, who learns that James' last name is Kendrick. When Fiona, Strong, and the CIA breach, Jesse tells them that "John Doe" is the victim, so Strong promises to help him.

Michael gets back to Miami and meets with Strong at the CIA headquarters, who tells him about James' Delta Force training. He tells Michael that their newest asset, John Doe, whose real name is Peter Millard, was in Delta Force with James and wants to meet with the guy who's been undercover with James. Michael walks in to meet with Peter, who tells Michael about a mission his and James' unit was sent on in Mogadishu to take out a warlord. The warlord turned out to be a punk kid with some friends and the rest of the village was full of women and children. Orders came down to take them all out anyway. Peter said he didn't want to do it and he asked James to try to talk the unit out of it but they wouldn't disobey a direct order. James told Peter he'd "take care of it."

Peter also tells Michael that in the middle of the night, James slit all of their throats, the whole unit. He tells Michael that no one can stop James; he tried, but was put away for 15 years. Peter says he loved James and would've followed him anywhere, but he led him straight to hell.

One day, a couple of James' operatives showed up at Michael's loft, asking for his phone and gun. Michael complies, so they take him to a warehouse where Sam, Fiona, and Jesse were also brought to the same way. As James finally arrives, Michael asks him why he didn't just tell him where to meet. James says he needed to know what they would do and they did just fine, revealing this was a test. James reveals that he needs a team in Miami since a man is set to be assassinated in the next 24 hours and they need to make sure it doesn't happen. The target is Omar Hamed, who doesn't know James' organization exists but if he dies then there would be a war that will affect their interests. James introduces them to Ben Snyder (David Meunier), who will be running the op. Snyder puts Michael and Sam on Hamed's security detail as Fiona and Jesse will work the perimeter. Snyder is a little shaky since he's a Middle Eastern expert who's running his first field op. Snyder says he's in and Michael says they're all in.

As Michael and Sam work together on security detail during Hamed's press conference, Fiona, Jesse, and Snyder were outside looking for potential threats. Michael spots a server with an earpiece, so he follows him outside as Sam gets Hamed to safety. Snyder cuts the server off in a van and climbs out with an assault rifle as Michael corners the server, who says that it wasn't his fault and "they" made him do it. Meanwhile, Hamed starts to choke and burns up. Another driver drives by and kills the server, so they realize that the server was confirming the hit. They take him to a combat-support hospital in James' warehouse where the doctor says he needs an antidote within 24 hours to save him. As Snyder and Sam argue over what to do next, Michael intervenes and says they should check with Fiona and Jesse.

Meanwhile, Madeline is concerned that she's being followed and is especially upset that James' men know her schedule and came to her house while Charlie was there. James later formally meets Madeline in her house, so she aims her gun at him immediately. James says that he's the man with answers, and adds that he cares about Michael and everyone else he cares about. James tells Madeline that he will go to extremes to do what's right, so he wants her to let him protect her, so she agrees but promises to shoot him on sight if he ever shows up in her house uninvited again. James crushes Madeline's cigarette case before he leaves.

Meanwhile, Fiona and Jesse track the server's phone call after the poisoning back to a strip club, whose owner is listed as a chemical engineer from Libya. Fiona and Jesse approach Mazek (Sammy Sheik), showing him $100,000 and 1,000 pills of ecstasy, provided by Snyder, and claim that they want him to make ecstasy for them. Whenever they get him in his office, however, they pull a gun on him and demand the antidote for the poison he gave Hamed. He calls their bluff, so Fi shoots out a window and they throw him into the water, with both of them jumping in with him. Afterwards, they meet with Snyder, who injects Mazek with his own poison, forcing him to take them to the antidote. As Michael and Sam see that Hamed is getting worse, they're forced to take him to the antidote, which is at a factory. After Mazek shows them where the antidote is, he goes to fill up a syringe and inject himself with the antidote, but Snyder takes it away and begins to strap him to a table. Mazek tries to run, but Snyder shoots at him, gaining the attention of several guards, who come in firing. After Jesse and Michael get the antidote to Hamed, Snyder and Fiona lay cover fire, but when Fiona sees a flammable tank with a hole shot through it. Sparks soon make the liquid flame up and Fiona calls for help, but Snyder runs out, saving himself. Michael asks where Fiona is and when he says she didn't make it, Michael realizes that Snyder never saw her die, so Michael runs in and finds a fire extinguisher and shoots it, temporarily extinguishing the flames between him and Fiona to provide a path to save her. A few hours later, Fiona wakes up in the combat hospital and Michael tells her that Hamed is going to be okay. She realizes that he came back for her and he says she would have done the same for her. Afterwards, James returns to the warehouse, hearing about Fiona and informing Michael that he owes her and his team a debt of gratitude, however he points a gun at Snyder for leaving Fiona to die, calling it cowardice and a betrayal. James then executes Snyder, with Michael standing there watching.

One night, Fiona follows Michael to a secluded area, where Michael tells her that he was ordered to leave the country quietly without telling anyone. She confronts him about watching James execute Snyder and Michael says he couldn't do anything about it since it would've blown his cover. Fiona is concerned that Michael likes what James is doing, but Michael reminds her that he's in deep cover and he knows where to draw the line. After reminding Michael about drawing the line with Sonya, Michael says nothing and leaves the country.

Fiona returns home the next morning to Carlos, who needs to return to his old neighborhood. Fiona decides to go with him, so they visit his old neighborhood where he learns that Nando, a criminal that he helped put in prison ten years ago, is out and wants him dead. The old neighbors try to kill him to collect a bounty, but Fiona is able to save him. They then talk to Detective Halloway with the Miami police department who wants them to find a witness who saw Nando commit murder and have him testify.

Meanwhile, Michael meets with Sonya in the Canary Islands where she reveals that James wants them to kill Roger Steele (Sebastian Roché), a broker between intelligence agencies who's been looking into Michael. Michael has a problem with this because Steele is a friend, but to maintain his deep cover, he acts like it's not a problem and sets up a meeting. Michael and Sonya meet with Steele, who's excited to see him since it's been a long time. After inviting them inside his compound, Michael talks to Steele and asks for a job, but Steele says he can't because he's Michael Westen, however he offers him money to help him out. Later, Michael meets with Strong, who is not pleased that he called a meeting now, but Michael informs him that Sonya brought him in for a kill mission and the target is Roger Steele. Strong figures out that Michael wants him to send in a team to extract Steele so he warns Michael that if he does that, he may as well pull Michael out too and reminds him to do whatever it takes, ordering him to go ahead and kill Steele. Eventually, Michael and Sonya set up an ambush outside of Steele's compound and they end up in a shootout against his men, so they go back to the hotel where Sonya plans to call in an air strike. However, Michael has a different plan and calls Steele, claiming that he was attacked by the same people who attacked them. After giving Steele a location to meet, Michael apologizes before killing him with a sniper rifle.

In Miami, Sam and Jesse work together to find the witness who can put Nando away. Naturally scared, he tries to run but they're able to take him to Madeline's house where Madeline tries to talk him into doing the right thing. In return for his cooperation, he wants witness protection, so Carlos tries to make arrangements. When he meets Detective Halloway, she demands to know where the witness is and is annoyed that he wants conditions. However, things get worse when Nando arrives, leading Carlos to figure out that Detective Halloway sold him out and he calls her a traitor to her badge. Nando is upset because he paid her to deliver Carlos and the witness but when she threatens to arrest him any day, he kills her and kidnaps Carlos. He then calls Fiona, ordering her to deliver the witness by 5 PM. After Michael returns to Miami with Sonya, Fiona calls him for help, so he has Sonya and the group go over Nando's head as he pretends to be the witness to get inside the warehouse where Carlos is being held hostage. Nando gets a call from his boss, Lopez, who orders one of Nando's men to shoot him and let everyone go. Afterwards, Carlos breaks up with Fiona after telling her that seven people died in an air strike on the drug cartel's compound. Meanwhile, Michael, still upset about killing Steele, is consoled by Sonya who knew it wasn't easy but says it was necessary and James has big plans for him.

The following week, Michael and Sonya create fake IDs together and Michael tries to get information from Sonya about where they're meeting James. She finally tells him that they're going to Latin America and that's all he gets. After they sleep together, Michael copies information from Sonya's phone and sends it to Strong, who's excited to finally end their mission. Michael and Sonya meet with James in Mexico as Sam, Jesse, Strong, and the CIA follow them, with Strong ordering his operatives to treat Michael like an enemy combatant until James and Sonya are captured. As Michael, Sonya, and James ride to their meeting, they are ambushed by the CIA. Michael steals a car and a woman's cell phone to put under the seat so the CIA can track him. After he splits up from James and Sonya, he heads to a boathouse with James' operatives and the Alpha team ambushes them, getting into a firefight with each other. After Michael knocks out one of James' men, he calls out to the leader of the Alpha team, telling him he's a friendly. After the leader tells him that they're all clear, Michael comes out and is horrified to see that the leader of the Alpha team is none other than Simon Escher (Garret Dillahunt), an old enemy he captured years ago.

Simon reveals that the fact Michael captured him makes him the perfect man for the job since Michael's in deep cover, the leader had to be someone who didn't work for the CIA and it had to be someone Michael would never work with. Simon reveals that he's been working for the CIA off the books for two years and they got him out of prison almost as soon as Michael put him in. In the meantime, Strong, Jesse, and Sam, who have been trying to find James and Sonya in a helicopter, end up having to land since the helicopter was losing fuel. Simon tries to work with Michael, who reluctantly reciprocates but then snaps when Simon tortures one of James' men to help Michael sell it while contacting James about being ambushed. Michael ends up fighting Simon with a knife, and when Simon says it's not too late and asks if he wants to be a hero, Michael says "Not like this" and kills him. James and Sonya find Michael in the boathouse and Michael notes that James came back for him. When they go to leave the boathouse, Michael sees Sam, Jesse, and Strong and decides to help James and Sonya escape. Once they make it to a safe house, James confronts Sonya since he believes she betrayed him and he threatens to kill her until Michael finally blows his cover, revealing that she didn't betray him, he did. After revealing that he's working with the CIA, Sonya is angry that Michael used her to give the information to the CIA and James is angry that his men died because of him. When James notes that he's killed for them, fought alongside them, helped them, he saw the fire in his eyes. Michael reveals that it was part of his cover and he made a deal with the CIA to keep his friends out of jail. James realizes that Michael could have ended his mission by letting him and Sonya walk out the door but he didn't. Michael begs for him to end it, so James hands Sonya his gun and she points it at Michael, who reveals that since the CIA hired Simon, they believe in nothing. Michael tells James that he thought what the CIA stood for was right and even after they burned him, he gave them everything and feels that he wasted his life for a lie. James, not satisfied yet, decides to let Michael live but is unsure of how to deal with his betrayal.

Some time later, after being held in a cell, Sonya comes down and tells Michael that James wants to talk. When she asks if anything was real between them, Michael reveals that he had a job to do and he was undercover for so long, he lost track of who he was. After Sonya says her heart belongs to her work, Michael is brought to James, who asks him what the CIA wants and if Michael doesn't give them what they want. Michael tells James that the CIA wants him and if they don't get him then his friends will spend the rest of their lives in a CIA detention center. James asks if Michael believes in what they do, so Michael reveals that he hasn't always agreed with James' methods but the jobs needed to be done. After telling James that he made Michael a part of something bigger than either of them, he gave him something to fight for and something to believe in. Satisfied, James decides to forgive Michael's betrayal and says he believes in him, so he offers him a way out of their situation, but in order to do that, he wants Michael to go back to Miami, return himself to the good graces of the CIA and lie to them. Michael then gets in contact with Strong, who thought Michael was dead, and lies to him, claiming his cover is intact and the operation is still alive. Michael and Strong travel to Langley to meet with the director, who is unhappy with the progress of the mission and how Strong is using Michael due to his reputation. Strong defends Michael not being able to capture James at that point and says that if not for Michael, they wouldn't come so close. The CIA director wants to shut down the operation but Michael convinces him to let him see it through. The director gives him 48 hours to finish the mission, but if he fails then they'll all meet again to discuss how deep a pit to toss Michael into.

Fiona is concerned that Michael isn't acting like himself since he had her, Sam, and Jesse pulled off the mission and made sure they weren't supposed to have contact with him. After planting a tracker bullet in Michael's gun, they track him to Fort Lauderdale. Sam doesn't want to believe that Michael betrayed the mission, but after he and Jesse spot Michael meeting with James after Michael told them that James wasn't going to make contact for at least 48 hours, Sam reluctantly agrees that Michael switched sides. Meanwhile, after getting on a boat with James and Sonya, Michael informs them that the CIA has given him 36 hours to wrap up this mission, so James decides to let Michael turn him in. Sonya refuses, but James says he's been compromised, however their work will continue and he appoints her and Michael as the two new leaders of his organization. He also says Michael will be a hero, his friends will stay out of prison and the CIA will never suspect that their ace operative is protecting them from within. Michael says that the CIA will want an update, so James has him tell them that he's coming to Miami. Michael then relays this information to Strong and tells him to get his team ready.

After Fiona tells Madeline about Michael switching sides, Madeline wonders what they should do. Fiona tearfully says they have to get him away from James, Sonya and all of it. They burn down Madeline's house before escaping from James' operatives, who were watching them from the outside. After they meet with Sam and Jesse, who managed to get a sea plane, they come up with a plan to grab Michael and leave. As Michael and Sonya work together with James to arrange his capture, she gets a call about the fire and Fiona's escape with Madeline and Charlie at Madeline's house. She tells Michael about it and he calls Sam, who urges Michael to get over to meet him and Fiona as soon as possible. Sam lies to Michael and says Fi is upset and unpredictable, and that she needs to hear from Michael. Michael at first resists, but when Sam pushes him more he decides to go. Sonya doesn't like that Fiona is causing trouble and warns Michael that the mission can't go wrong. Michael leaves.

Once Michael meets with Sam, they ride together, but Michael gets nervous when he realizes that Sam is lying to him, so he gets Sam to stop the car and angrily confronts him about lying to him. Sam then says "Who's lying to who brother?" and reveals that they tailed him to that marina where they saw him shake hands with James. Michael says he doesn't understand and he's trying to protect all of them. Sam disagrees and reminds him that he's supposed to be working for the CIA, so Michael screams that the CIA hired Simon, they burned him, left him out in the dark and ruined his life, so he owes them nothing. Sam agrees that the CIA isn't perfect but says they answer to somebody while James answers to nobody. Michael doesn't see the problem with that but Sam reminds him that the people who ruined his life and got Nate killed thought they were doing good things too. Michael insists it's not the same thing and stops short of admitting that he's taking over James' organization, but Sam realizes what he's saying. Michael reveals that he'll have resources and operatives under his control and he'll do what he thinks is right. Sam asks him what will happen if one day someone gets in his way when running the organization, so Michael begins to leave, but Sam stops him and they fight physically. Sam tackles Michael off the bridge and they both fall into the water, where Sam tries to use the water to his advantage and knock Michael out. Michael forces himself to stay calm to get Sam to drop his guard, but then elbows him and they both swim up to a ladder. Michael promises to let this go but coldly warns Sam to stay out of his way.

Michael returns to Sonya and says that Fiona won't be a problem. They continue to arrange for James' capture, so Michael gets in contact with James, who promises to be there in 20 minutes and tells Michael he's proud of him. As James' pilot flies him to the building in a helicopter, Michael calls Strong with the update so Strong and his team head their way and praises Michael for his good work.

As Sam beats himself up for failing to grab Michael, he admits defeat and says that Michael's lost so there's nothing they can do. Madeline convinces them not to give up on Michael so they track him to a satellite uplink building. As Sam and Jesse keep James' men distracted, Fiona runs up to the roof to confront Michael, who warns her that she can't be there. Michael says he made his choice and it's too late, but Fiona appeals to him and asks if it's too late for the Michael Westen she fell in love with; the one who knows what he's doing is wrong. Sonya comes back up to the roof and confronts Michael since she thought Fiona wouldn't be a problem but Fiona says he was wrong. After Sonya gives her one chance to leave, Fiona refuses, so Sonya pulls out her gun and Michael tries to stop her, saying he'll talk to Fiona. Michael, confused about what he's truly fighting for, is torn between moving forward with his plan with Sonya and saving Fiona. Sonya tries to pressure him into letting go, but Fiona gently tells Michael to do what he thinks is right.

Michael chooses to kill Sonya after she almost kills Fiona. James, enraged by what he saw, informs his operatives that Michael has betrayed them and orders them to eliminate him and Fiona with no mercy. James then orders his pilot to get him out of there. Michael and Fiona then escape from James' operatives and leave with Sam and Jesse. Once they get to a safe spot, they throw their phones away and Michael beats himself up for betraying the mission and turning on all of them. He wants them to just go and get his mom and Charlie out of Miami, but they refuse to leave him behind. Michael says he's "in". They then head to a gas station where Sam and Jesse buy beer and new burner phones while Michael and Fiona hotwire a car. Michael admits that he hesitated in shooting Sonya despite their history, but Fiona reminds him that it doesn't matter because he made the choice she thought he would and shot Sonya. She tells Michael she knew that if she was wrong about him then she would be dead. Meanwhile, the gas station clerk aims a shotgun at Sam and Jesse, who look at the news and see their faces on the news along with Michael and Fiona's, identifying all four of them as fugitives. Since there's a $50,000 reward for their capture, they plan to hand them over but Michael recklessly drives into the gas station and saves Sam and Jesse, apparently not caring if he lives or dies. As the team evade the cops and the CIA, they get someplace safe and Michael calls Strong, who's upset with Michael since he failed to deliver James. Michael pleads with Strong to leave his friends out of this and promises to come in but Strong tells Michael that the CIA is fresh out of deals for him. After telling Michael that this operation and his career are over, he threatens Michael by saying, "You think it was tough being burned, you haven't seen anything yet."

Michael decides that they have one card left to play; they go after James and his network directly. They agree to the plan, but want Michael to visit his mom first. Michael visits Madeline and promises that Fiona got to him before it was too late before revealing that the CIA is hunting them because they found out what he was doing. After Michael reveals he's going after James, she pleads with him not to incite James because she doesn't want to lose another son. He says he can't make any promises. She tells him that Charlie's birthday is coming up and he said he wanted his "Uncle Michael" to be there. She tells him they're having strawberry ice cream, which his brother Nate loved. She wonders what she's supposed to tell Charlie when he asks if Michael isn't able to make it to the party. Michael says nothing, but hugs Maddy and kisses her on the head before leaving.

Michael meets with Jesse who had a buddy track down Max Lyster (Alan Ruck), the man who worked on James' communication center. The problem is that he's security conscious and lives in a gated community, so Michael decides to track him down but asks Jesse to watch over his mom and Charlie. Jesse agrees, so the next day, Michael and Fiona are in one car while Sam is preparing a makeshift roadblock. Max's car goes over Sam's spike strip and takes two gunshots from Sam without any problem. The car is armored. Michael urges Fiona to follow up next to Max's car, takes a bit of C-4 Fiona had in her bag. Michael sticks it under the car's fender and even though it doesn't blow the car up, the force is enough to flip it over. Max gets out and Michael gets right in his face, threatening to kill him if he doesn't give up the location of James' communications center. Max reveals it's in a building downtown. Michael demands that Max take them there.

The group sits outside a huge, old newspaper building. Max says it's unmanned and that it's just a relay system. Max reveals there's a hard drive backing up everything that goes in and out of the center. Michael says that's what they need to bring to the CIA.

Before they break into the building, Fiona and Sam confront Michael about his apparently death wish. Michael doesn't want to talk about it and blows up the wall of the building. Inside, they walk toward the center of the building and notice a line of explosives along the walls; apparently booby traps set to keep intruders out. They get to the communications center inside and Fiona punches in the code to unlock it. Once they get inside and get the hard drive, all of their phones ring at the same time. Michael answers his and it's James, who is still upset that Michael betrayed him again and reveals that he tracked him down with the cell phones Sam and Jesse stole from the gas station the day before. Unfortunately, while James had tracked Michael to the communications center, he also tracked Madeline down to where she was hiding out with Charlie. Michael wants James to leave his family out of it, but James says he won't hesitate to shoot them down like dogs the way he shot Sonya. James tells Michael to surrender, face what he's done and die, but tells him that he'll use his friends as bargaining chips for the CIA. Michael asks for some time but James knows Michael will just think of a way out of his situation, telling him it's only the reckoning now.

When James allows Michael two minutes to talk to Madeline, Michael calls her, so she tells him not to give James anything. Madeline says she's found a way to get Jesse and Charlie out and she plans to use an explosive without a remote detonator. Michael realizes that Madeline plans to sacrifice herself, but Madeline says that sometimes sacrifices have to be made and if she doesn't make it out of it, that's fine with her. Michael cries when Madeline tells him they all made mistakes but she's so proud of the man he is and tells him she loves him. After they say goodbye, Jesse insists there has to be another way. She tells him he has to fight his way out and she can't do it. Madeline calls Charlie over and tells him she loves him and would do anything in the world to protect him. She tells him to go hide with Jesse and cover his ears. She takes a hug from him. Jesse hugs her too, and Madeline tells him to go. After Jesse takes Charlie to hide, Madeline smokes one last cigarette as James' operatives approach and says "This one's for my boys" before detonating the bomb, killing herself and James' operatives. Although Jesse tears up over her death and sacrifice, he keeps Charlie safe as he takes out James' operatives.

Meanwhile, Sam has Michael call her back but when Sam tries calling her back, the line is disconnected. Michael is now determined to fight since his mom bought him a second chance and he owes it to her to use it. As Michael has Sam take the hard drive to the CIA, he and Fiona come out and pretend to surrender, but they engage in a shootout against James and his men. Sam escapes the building after killing one of James' men as Michael and Fiona work together to stay alive. When Michael comes up with a plan to take James down, Fiona wonders if it's about his death wish but Michael reveals he wants to live more than he ever has. Michael makes a run for it as Fiona kills James' operatives. As Michael gets to a safe spot, Fiona slides him her gun, giving him the opportunity to shoot James twice in the chest. Michael and Fiona go up to James as he slides James' gun away, telling him it's over. James taunts him about turning him in and reveals that Michael's old life is gone, saying it was gone the moment he decided that Fiona was more important to him than anything else. Michael agrees before trying to deliver James to the CIA. James refuses and reveals a dead man's switch, saying the explosives weren't just for keeping people out. After he drops it, the building explodes, killing James and presumably Michael and Fiona as well.

Later, Sam and Jesse have been detained by the CIA and are brought to Strong's office, where Strong tells them he knows it's been a hard time for a lot of reasons but the hard drive led to the capture of over 100 of James' operatives. Strong tells Jesse and Sam that although some in the CIA want them to remain locked up, he tells them they're the heroes of this op so he got them cleared, revealing that they're free to go. Strong also informs them that Michael is going to get a star on the CIA Memorial Wall as an agent fallen in the line of duty. Sam and Jesse then hold a funeral for Madeline, Michael, and Fiona but then Sam says they missed a "hell of a funeral". Jesse wonders where they are and Sam says probably in a place with lots of C-4 and yogurt. After Sam asks Jesse if he wants to join him at the Carlito to meet with a friend of Elsa's who was in trouble and needed help, Jesse agrees and asks Sam if he's buying the mojitos. Sam then wishes Michael good luck wherever he is.

In a flashback, Michael and Fiona are revealed to be alive as they were able to escape the building after James let go of a dead man's switch, causing it to explode. Since Michael and Fiona faked their deaths, they took Charlie out of the country to settle down someplace remote (presumably Ireland), where they're now raising him as their own. After Michael asks Fiona what he should tell Charlie when he's older, Fiona says he should tell the truth and start with "My name is Michael Westen. I used to be a spy."

== Cast ==
Jack Coleman plays Andrew Strong, a CIA officer who pushes Michael to do whatever it takes to complete a mission that has consumed Strong for eight years. Stephen Martines plays Carlos Cruz, a bounty hunter who is Fiona's new boyfriend. Nick Tarabay plays Dexter Gamble, a freelance operative, in two episodes. Adrian Pasdar plays Randall Burke, a former special ops soldier who is suspected of running a freelance terrorist ring. Ricardo Antonio Chavira guest stars in two episodes as international terrorist Rafael Serrano. Charles Mesure makes a guest appearance as Jack Frakes, the head of a criminal hacking syndicate. Alona Tal plays Sonya, the woman Burke calls "the key to everything", while John Pyper-Ferguson plays her boss, James Kendrick.

Tim Matheson reprises his role as "Dead Larry" Sizemore in one of Michael's hallucinations. Garret Dillahunt returns as Simon Escher in the season's eleventh episode.

== Episodes ==
No. overall	No. in season	Title	Directed by	Written by	Original release date	Prod. code	US viewers (millions)
99	1	"New Deal"	Stephen Surjik	Matt Nix	June 6, 2013	BN701	4.32
As part of his deal with the CIA, Michael's new handler, Agent Strong, sends him to the Dominican Republic on deep cover, with the difficult task of breaking up a terrorist network they suspect is being run by an old friend of his named Burke. While working to gain Burke's notice and become part of the organization, Michael is called back to Miami to go after a mysterious man (Guest Star: Nick Tarabay) attempting to find out where he is by going after his friends and family, as they try to move on with their lives.
100	2	"Forget Me Not"	Jeffrey Donovan	Ben Watkins	June 13, 2013	BN702	4.29
Michael returns to Miami with strict instructions not to contact anyone, except for his mother who is endangering his operation. While tracking down the mystery man, Michael finds that the man is connected to people who can ruin his cover with Burke while at the same time covertly listening to his friends' complaints about the mess he made in leaving them. Along the way, the man kidnaps Fiona to flush Michael out, only to be shot dead by the CIA when they and Michael come to her rescue, using a line that hearkens back to the time when they first met in Ireland, a story told in small flashbacks throughout the episode, except in the present, unlike in Ireland, she chooses her current boyfriend over Michael.
101	3	"Down Range"	Scott Peters	Craig O'Neill	June 20, 2013	BN703	3.40
Despite being wanted by Dominican authorities, Michael is forced to return to the Caribbean nation to help Burke steal a multi-million dollar satellite truck, purportedly to sell it to a fellow terrorist, so Michael asks Strong to let him use Sam and Jesse. Nothing goes as expected at the exchange, as Burke reveals it was all a ruse so he could kidnap the terrorist for his bosses, and Michael's team has to provide assistance when the CIA's presence is exposed. Back in Miami, Nate's former bookie comes after Madeline to collect his outstanding debt, so she teams up with Fiona to gain the upper hand on him so that none of Nate's debtors will have the same idea.
102	4	"Brothers in Arms"	Dennie Gordon	Alfredo Barrios, Jr.	June 27, 2013	BN704	3.87
In order to find an associate of Burke's, a woman named Sonya being imprisoned by Russian spies, Michael is dispatched to threaten the captured terrorist's family in order to find out what he knows about Sonya's location. Before Burke pushes the man to suicide, he points them to Cuba, and Michael's team combines their efforts to get Sonya where they can grab her, but their initial bluff is called so they divert her captor's attention long enough to sneak in and grab Sonya. To help Michael escape with her, Burke sacrifices himself, but, without Sonya's trust, Michael's team goes after her when she slips their grasp.
103	5	"Exit Plan"	Marc Roskin	Michael Horowitz	July 11, 2013	BN705	3.04
To calm Sonya down, Michael convinces her he and his team are friends who will help her escape Cuba as soon as possible, but a ruthless Russian agent familiar to Sonya keeps getting in their way, forcing them to improvise their exit plan as Strong blackmails Fiona to assist Michael. Once the four get back to Miami, Sonya discovers that the reason the Russians are after her is she's been exposed by a hacking syndicate, and she asks Michael to help destroy them.
104	6	"All or Nothing"	Jonathan Frakes	Rashad Raisani	July 18, 2013	BN706	2.86
True to his word, Michael teams up with Fiona to become part of the specialized hacking group that outed Sonya to the Russians, intending to wipe their hard drive after infecting it with a virus. As part of their cover, they send Sam and Jesse to contract help from the recently freed Barry, but he won't budge until they track down his girlfriend, who disappeared while he was in jail. With all this going on, Michael negotiates with Sonya to take him to her superiors, but she wants to ensure his commitment to the cause, so, after he completely opens up his emotions, she agrees to make contact.
105	7	"Psychological Warfare"	Larry Teng	Ryan Johnson & Peter Lalayanis	July 25, 2013	BN707	3.06
After a thorough interrogation from Sonya's boss, Michael is locked in a padded room for torture involving sensory disruption and drug-induced hallucinations to reveal every secret he has, everything from his personal/family life to his work, especially a mission with Larry that completely changed Michael. Meanwhile, after Sonya raids his loft for evidence to destroy, his friends tail her to the waterfront compound, where she helps him escape under false pretenses. But, another memory of his dad, whose abuse has motivated Michael in life, clinches his commitment to the cause. Out on the water, his friends are shocked by this, but Sonya and her boss, James, welcome him to the family before sending him home to recuperate.
106	8	"Nature of the Beast"	Tawnia McKiernan	Bridget Tyler	August 1, 2013	BN708	3.60
Deep undercover in James' organization, Michael unintentionally loses contact with the CIA, as his first assignment for James sees him working to complete Burke's unfinished mission, which involves exposing a corrupt Dominican drug enforcement official as a major drug smuggler. As time goes on, Michael becomes drawn to James' ethos, so his friends track down a man James institutionalized after their time in the Delta Force to learn more about him. When the soldier meets Michael, he reveals a secret about an operation they did for the military that went bad, and Michael begins to realize that, despite his high ideals, James is incredibly dangerous.
107	9	"Bitter Pill"	Bill Eagles	Alfredo Barrios, Jr. & Daniel Tuch	August 8, 2013	BN709	3.69
In order to help a peace-seeking Middle Eastern diplomat get to an important conference in another country, everyone in James' organization is put on the man's security to keep bounty hunters at bay. After he ingests a deadly poison while under their watch, they turn to an associate (Guest Star: David Meunier) to help track down the one person who can provide the antidote, which is in a heavily guarded facility. Meanwhile, Madeline worries when James' people begin following her, so he comes to assure her he's only trying to protect her and her grandson Charlie, son of Michael's deceased brother Nate. As for Michael's mission, it ends with mixed results: they secure the antidote to save their client, but James kills his friend in front of everyone because Michael had to rescue Fiona when the man selfishly left her for dead.
108	10	"Things Unseen"	Craig Siebels	Ben Watkins & Craig O'Neill	August 15, 2013	BN710	3.66
For his next solo assignment, after someone starts probing for information about Michael's team, Sonya tells Michael to kill the guy, an international middleman he considers a friend (Sebastian Roché). To Michael's surprise, Strong gives him the go-ahead in order to preserve his cover, and, after Michael completes the mission, Sonya consoles him by saying he was a legitimate threat whose execution is justified by James' endgame. At the same time, Fiona's boyfriend learns that a drug dealer he helped imprison is now free and looking for blood, so, to avoid being spotted, he asks Fiona and the guys to track down a secretive witness from his old neighborhood who can help put the man back behind bars. After Fiona's beau is captured by his enemy, they turn to Sonya, and her questionable tactics, to liberate him, only to see him tearfully break up with Fiona over Michael's clear influence on her life.
109	11	"Tipping Point"	Scott Peters	Rashad Raisani & Michael Horowitz	August 22, 2013	BN711	3.64
Michael arranges with Strong to have the CIA follow James' crew on a mission in Mexico, and Strong hires mercenaries to secretly help them ambush James' crew to kidnap their leader. In Miami, Fiona helps the effort by keeping an eye on Madeline, but, with James' men at the house, Fiona can't move until he's in CIA custody, except the operation fails. In the chaos, James, Michael and Sonya escape in opposite directions, culminating in Michael's reunion with an old acquaintance, Simon, and the revelation he's been running black ops for the CIA. With the CIA focused on James, the two look to do their part, but Simon's madness causes Michael to kill him, and, once everyone's safe, James blames Sonya. To protect her, Michael blows his cover and lays his life on the line, outlining Simon's influence on why he's now helping them, and James, amid mild dissatisfaction with Michael's confession, lets him live.
110	12	"Sea Change"	Stephen Surjik	Ryan Johnson & Peter Lalayanis	September 5, 2013	BN712	3.79
To assuage doubts about his authenticity and commitment to their mission, Michael expresses no desire for his Miami life and makes a deal with James: to keep his friends and family out of jail, he'll take over James' organization with Sonya after giving him up to the CIA, working to undermine them as a triple agent. As things unfold, his friends become convinced he's now working for the enemy and plot to get him out of the country immediately, along with Madeline, but Michael and Sam come to blows when he sees their trap and they can't agree on if he's made the right choice in James. Despite Sam's warning, Michael regroups with Sonya to plan James' capture, while Sam and the team follow them to the handoff site, determined to save Michael from himself. James is bearing down in his helicopter when Fiona comes up to the roof, resolved to get "the old Michael" back even if it ruins the operation, and, with Sonya pressing, the screen goes black with a gunshot from a Mexican standoff.
111	13	"Reckoning"	Matt Nix	Matt Nix	September 12, 2013	BN713	4.97
Following Sonya's death, Michael and his team flee from both law enforcement and James' organization, when taking James out becomes their only viable option. The rest of the team kidnaps a communications engineer (Alan Ruck) who helped James receive and transmit encrypted information from a satellite dish on top of an abandoned building. Jesse hides with Charlie from James' hit squad when they are ordered to kill Madeline and Charlie. Madeline sacrifices herself when detonating a C-4 bomb, destroying the safe house and 3 assassins, giving Jesse time to kill another 2 assassins. Michael's team retrieves the hard drive for the CIA and takes out James and his squad despite running out of ammo. Mortally wounded, James destroys the entire building when he activates a dead-man device, presumably killing Michael and Fiona. Some time later, Sam and Jesse take the hard drive to Strong, and its information allows the capture of more than 100 dangerous terrorists. Strong declines to prosecute their crimes while rewarding Michael with his CIA star. Sam and Jesse decide to continue Michael's work of helping people with tough problems. In the final scene in an unspecified location, Michael asks Fiona what to tell Charlie when he asks future questions about their tumultuous life, she tells him to start at the beginning with: "My name is Michael Westen. I used to be a spy..."
