= Westren =

Westren is a surname. Notable people with the surname include:

- Ryan Westren (born 1984), Cornish rugby union player
- Herbert Westren Turnbull (1885–1961), English mathematician

== See also ==
- Westen
