= Pilot (Burn Notice) =

- Burn Notice episode
- Episode no.: Season 1 Episode 1
- Directed by: Jace Alexander
- Written by: Matt Nix
- Production code: BN100
- Original air date: June 28, 2007

Episode chronology
← Previous —	Next → "Identity"

"Pilot" is the first episode of Burn Notice, an American television drama series created for the USA Network.

A spy kicked out of the Agency is stuck in Miami, Florida, where he helps locals who can not rely on the police. In the opener, Michael Westen (Jeffrey Donovan) finds himself cut off from his contacts and his cash, so he agrees to help a man clear his name in a high-priced art theft. Along the way he gets help from his ex-girlfriend and a retired Navy SEAL, and grief from his mother, who is unaware of his career.

== Plot ==
While on assignment in Nigeria, covert operative Michael Westen learns that he's been "burned". For a spy, it is the equivalent of being fired. A burned spy is blacklisted from all government agencies and resources; his bank accounts are frozen and his credit is trashed. Michael barely escapes Nigeria and wakes up, battered, in a motel in Miami, Florida. In order to survive and fund his own personal investigation, Michael enlists the help of the only two "friends" he has: Fiona Glenanne, an ex-IRA operative who also happens to be an ex-girlfriend, and Sam Axe, a washed-out military intelligence contact who has been under surveillance by the Federal Bureau of Investigation (FBI). He is also forced to deal with the family he went halfway around the world to get away from—particularly his mother, Madeline Westen, who could not be happier to have her son back in town.

Through former spy-turned-security consultant Lucy Chen—whom Michael helped learn the trade—he gets a lead on a small investigation job: a caretaker of an estate, Javier (David Zayas), has been accused of stealing valuable art from his employer, Graham Pyne (Ray Wise). All evidence points to it being an inside job and Javier, with very little money to offer, has nowhere else to turn. When Michael begins to dig around, he quickly discovers that it was in fact an inside job: Pyne orchestrated the robbery and framed Javier in order to collect insurance.

Michael confronts Pyne with the incriminating evidence. When Pyne and his bodyguard come after Javier and his son, Michael is already a step ahead of them and has set up a trap at Javier's house. After the smoke clears, Pyne has accidentally shot his bodyguard, and Michael has enough evidence to send both of them to jail for conspiracy to commit kidnapping. With the mounting evidence hanging over his head, Pyne agrees to clear Javier's name and provide financial support to Javier and his son.

Meanwhile, Michael keeps trying to get in touch with his old government handler, Dan Siebels (Dan Martin), who will not accept his calls. Deciding to get creative, Michael resorts to mailing Siebels a fake bomb in order to get his attention. The ploy works, and Michael finally gets to confront Siebels about the burn notice. Siebels believes Michael has probably been framed and there is nothing he can do to help him, but that he still has allies within the Agency. He tells Michael not to leave Miami, unless he wants an FBI manhunt after him. To top it all off, Michael returns home to find his door open and the floor covered with surveillance photos. It is not the FBI, but whoever it is, they have been tracking his every move. And they have left a message: "Welcome to Miami."

== Production ==
Burn Notice was created by writer Matt Nix when he desired to do a grounded spy show that explored the lives of spies in a realistic manner. After consulting with actual CIA operative Michael Wilson (whom Nix admitted he never actually met, only speaking to him via phone conversation), Nix was inspired to write a pilot script centered around a spy receiving a burn notice, taking influence from the James Bond films, the books of John Le Carré, and TV series like The Rockford Files and It Takes a Thief.

The pilot was originally produced to be shown as a two-hour movie or as two one-hour episodes. When USA decided to broadcast it uninterrupted, it was edited to fit a 90-minute time slot; this version is also on the Season 1 DVD. The two-part version was eventually shown in Australia.

Filming began in December 2006.

== Reception ==
Approximately four million viewers tuned into the series premiere of Burn Notice. Jeff Commings of the Arizona Daily Star felt the first episode was better than the second, and overall the show was "good, not great." The teleplay by Matt Nix won a 2008 Edgar Allan Poe Award, honoring the best in mystery, in the category Best Television Episode Teleplay.
