= Karl Twesten =

German politician and author (1820–1870)

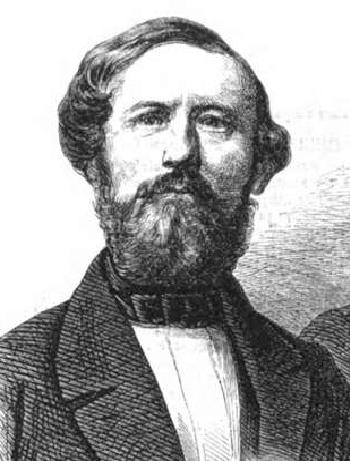
Karl Twesten

Karl Twesten (April 22, 1820 in Kiel – October 14, 1870 in Berlin) was a German politician and writer.

== Biography ==
He was the son of German theologian August Detlev Christian Twesten. He became connected with the judicial service, and was one of the founders of the progressive party, which in 1861 involved him in a duel with Gen. Edwin von Manteuffel, in which he lost his right arm. In the same year, he was elected to the Prussian chamber of deputies (German: Preußisches Abgeordnetenhaus), and he was one of the founders of the National Liberal Party and an early member of the North German Reichstag (German: Reichstag des Norddeutscher Bundes). Persecuted for advocating the fullest parliamentary freedom, he retired in 1868 after being fined.

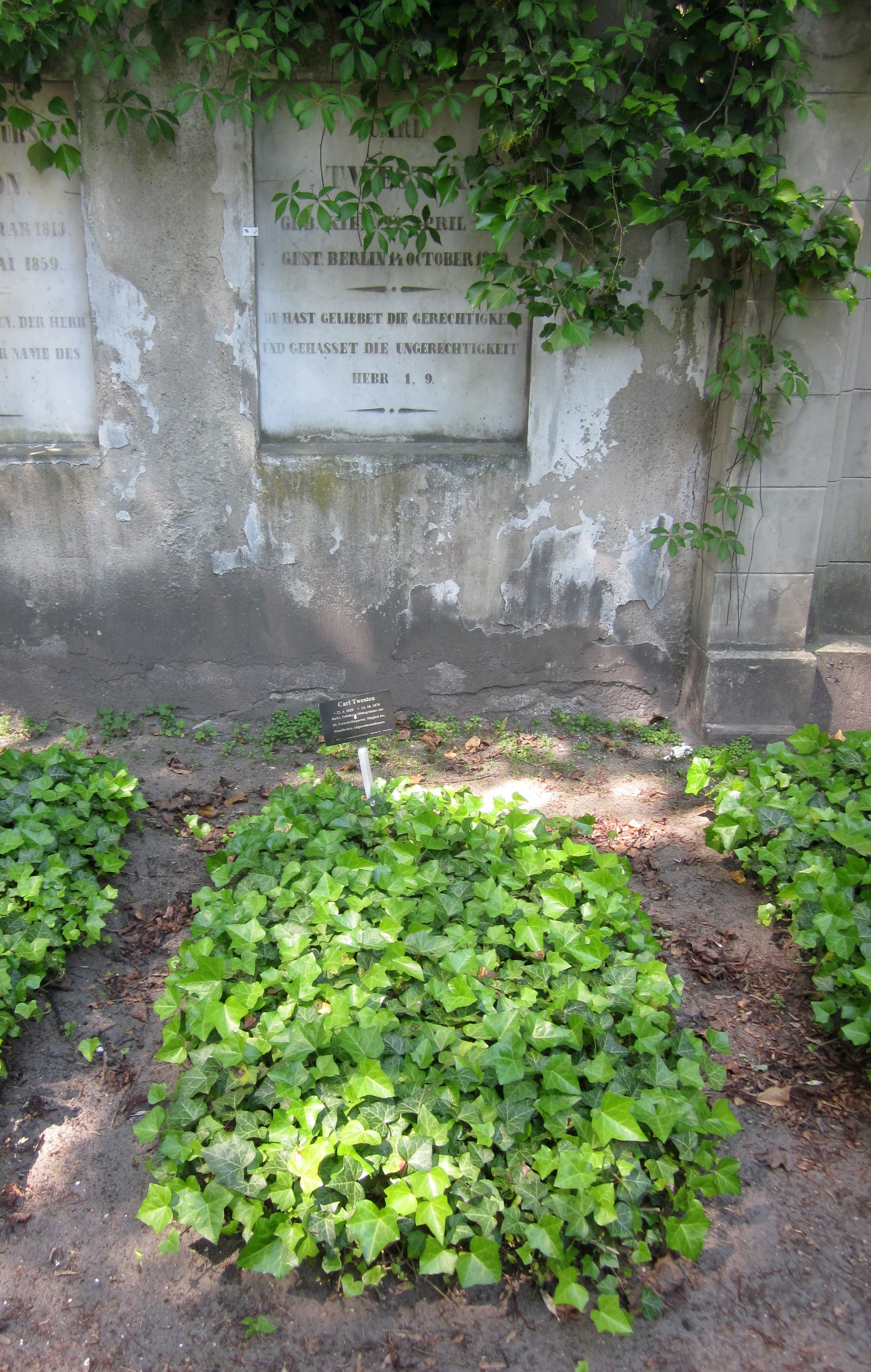
Twesten family grave at the Cemetery I of Trinity Church on Mehringdamm in Berlin-Kreuzberg.

== Works ==
- Schiller in seinem Verhältniss zur Wissenschaft ("Friedrich Schiller in his relationship to knowledge"; Berlin, 1863).
- Machiavelli (1868)
- Die religiösen, politischen und socialen Ideen der asiatischen Culturvölker und der Aegypter in ihrer historischen Entwickelung, posthumous ("The religious, political and social ideas of the Asiatic cultures and the Egyptions in their historical development"; edited by Moritz Lazarus, 1873).
