= August Detlev Christian Twesten =

Protestant theologian

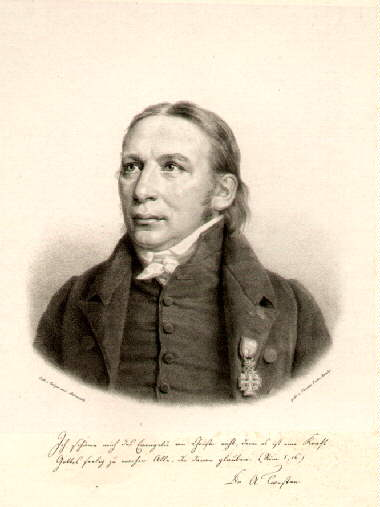

August Detlev Christian Twesten (born in Glückstadt, April 11, 1789; died in Berlin, January 8, 1876) was a Lutheran theologian of Germany.

== Biography ==
He studied at the University of Kiel, and for a period of time, worked as a gymnasium teacher in Berlin. In 1814 he returned to Kiel as an associate professor of philosophy and theology, and soon ranked next to Claus Harms in the Lutheran church of Holstein. In 1835 he succeeded Friedrich Schleiermacher at the University of Berlin, and in 1850 became a member of the new supreme ecclesiastical council of the United Evangelical Church. He was one of the chief representatives of those who strive to reconcile the views of Schleiermacher with orthodox Lutheranism.

== Published works ==
- Vorlesungen über die Dogmatik der evangelisch-lutherischen Kirche ("Lectures on the dogma of the Evangelical Lutheran Church"; 2 vols., Hamburg, 1826–37).
- Grundriss der analytischen Logik ("Outline of analytical logic"; Kiel, 1834).
- Friedrich Schleiermachers Grundriss der philosophischen Ethik ("Schleiermacher's Grundriss der philosophischen Ethik", 1841).

== Family ==
His son Karl Twesten was a noted politician and author.
