= Reckoning (Burn Notice) =

- Burn Notice episode
- Episode no.: Season 7 Episode 13
- Directed by: Matt Nix
- Written by: Matt Nix
- Production code: BN713
- Original air date: September 12, 2013

Episode chronology
← Previous "Sea Change"	Next → —

"Reckoning" is the final episode of Burn Notice, an American television drama series created for the USA Network.

Michael Westen and his friends are pursued by a group of assassins. Madeline sacrifices herself so the group can escape the hitmen.

== Plot ==
Michael Westen (Jeffrey Donovan) and his team flee from both law enforcement and James' organization, when taking James out becomes their only viable option. The rest of the team kidnaps a communications engineer (Alan Ruck) who helped James receive and transmit encrypted information from a satellite dish on top of an abandoned building. Jesse hides with Charlie from James' hit squad when they are ordered to kill Madeline and Charlie. Madeline sacrifices herself when detonating a C-4 bomb, destroying the safe house and 3 assassins, giving Jesse time to kill another 2 assassins. Michael's team retrieves the hard drive for the CIA and takes out James and his squad despite running out of ammo. Mortally wounded, James destroys the entire building when he activates a dead-man device, presumably killing Michael and Fiona. Some time later, Sam and Jesse take the hard drive to Strong, and its information allows the capture of more than 100 dangerous terrorists. Strong declines to prosecute their crimes while rewarding Michael with his CIA star. Sam and Jesse decide to continue Michael's work of helping people with tough problems. In the final scene in an unspecified location, Michael asks Fiona what to tell Charlie when he asks future questions about their tumultuous life, she tells him to start at the beginning with: "My name is Michael Westen. I used to be a spy..."

== Production ==
During production, Matt Nix and Sharon Gless were the only people who knew about Madeline's death. The show was ended because the writer could not keep the plot going and felt they needed to wrap it up in season 7.

== Reception ==
Approximately five million viewers tuned into the series finale of Burn Notice. The finale was praised by critics for being a fitting conclusion to the series.
