= Westen =

Westen may refer to:

== Names ==
- Brodie Westen (1932–2021), head college football coach for the Western Illinois University Leathernecks
- Drew Westen, Professor of Psychology and Psychiatry at Emory University in Atlanta, Georgia
- Madeline Westen, fictional character portrayed by Sharon Gless in the television series Burn Notice
- Marcel van der Westen (born 1976), Dutch hurdler and tax attorney
- Michael Westen, fictional character portrayed by Jeffrey Donovan in the television series Burn Notice
- Nate Westen, fictional character portrayed by Seth Peterson in the television series Burn Notice
- Thomas Edvard von Westen Sylow (1792–1875), the Norwegian Minister of the Army and member of the Council of State Division in Stockholm

== Media ==
- Westen, a 2013 German drama directed by Christian Schwochow

== See also ==
- Sieg im Westen (Victory in the West), a 1941 German propaganda film
