= List of Burn Notice characters =

The main cast of Burn Notice during seasons 1–3. Left to right: Sharon Gless as Madeline Westen, Bruce Campbell as Sam Axe, Jeffrey Donovan as Michael Westen and Gabrielle Anwar as Fiona Glenanne.

This is a list of fictional characters in the television series Burn Notice. The article deals with the series' main and recurring characters.

== Main characters ==
=== Michael Westen ===
Michael Alan Westen
- Burn Notice character
- Jeffrey Donovan as Michael Westen
- First appearance: "Pilot"
- Last appearance: "Reckoning"
- Created by: Matt Nix
- Portrayed by: Jeffrey Donovan

In-universe information
- Alias: Michael McBride
- Gender: Male
- Occupation: CIA Operations Officer/Freelance Private Investigator
- Family: Frank Westen (father, deceased); Madeline Westen (mother, deceased); Nate Westen (brother, deceased); Ruth (sister-in-law); Charlie Westen (nephew/adopted son)
- Nationality: American

Michael Westen played by Jeffrey Donovan is a burned spy who is forced to work in Miami while figuring out who burned him. He had a relationship with Fiona Glenanne, but proved to be afraid of commitment. Above all else, he fears his neurotic mother who is entirely focused on Michael. He keeps up a good, friendly relationship with Sam Axe. While searching for answers about his burn notice, Michael becomes an unlicensed freelance private investigator/troubleshooter to help those who have unique problems, which can't involve the authorities. Michael Alan Westen was born on January 7, 1967, and raised in Miami, the first of two sons to Frank and Madeline Westen. His father was a violent man, who would physically and emotionally abuse his sons as an obedience measure, and his mother did little to prevent it. His father would also take advantage of him, for example, he forced Michael to fake a seizure inside a Mr. Goodwrench store so his father could steal spark plugs. The last words his father said to him were "I'll see you in hell, boy." Eight years before the beginning of the series, his father died. After persistent persuasion by his mother, Michael finally visited his father's grave. Michael's younger brother, Nate, is a compulsive gambler who has a history of stealing from Michael to fund his addiction. However, after helping Michael and almost dying, he has turned his life around, which Michael seems to have difficulty believing. After a brief quarrel with his brother, Michael wins his father's black 1973 Dodge Charger by a coin toss.

Michael enlisted in the U.S. Army when he was 17 years old, and his mother forged his father's signature so he could enlist because his father was such a bad influence on him. Nate also didn’t need a bad influence from both his brother and his father at the same time. Little is mentioned about his time in the Army but it is known that he was a Ranger and later a Green Beret. It was implied in an episode that he served in San Pedro, Laguna before he was recruited to work as a spy. He served for 15 years, working in Europe and the OPEC nations as a covert operative who did freelance work for the CIA. While on a mission in Nigeria, he received a burn notice from CIA superiors. After managing to embark on an airplane in Nigeria, Michael is deserted in Miami, with Fiona Glenanne, his ex-girlfriend.

Per the conditions of Michael's burn notice, his assets are frozen, his line of credit is destroyed, and he has no career history with which to seek employment. He is free to travel within Miami, but any attempts to leave the city will result in immediate arrest. Michael now has to find work that suits his unusual skillset and knowledge. He counts on longtime friends like Sam Axe, who informed on him to the FBI until midway through the first season, and Fiona to help him perform such tasks while arguing with his mother, and trying to find out who burned him and why.

Michael lives in a decrepit loft situated over a nightclub, with a bed, workbench, some barbells, a punching bag, an oven, a few chairs, a mid-1990s-era computer, and a refrigerator filled with yogurt and beer. Despite the Miami climate, there is no air conditioning. He obtained the loft in the pilot episode when he assisted his Russian landlord and club owner by ridding a drug dealer (Raymond, nicknamed "Sugar") who also lived on the premises. He also spends time at hotels in Miami, as well as at his mother's house. Though annoyed by his mother at times, Michael has shown love for her. Michael even cries when his mother risks her own life to save him and his nephew.

Upon returning to Miami, Michael was watched by the FBI. It was revealed that he was burned to be recruited by a mysterious organization and is contacted by a woman named Carla. After Carla was fatally shot by Fiona, Michael received an offer to replace her from a man referred to as the organization's "Management." He refused to take the job and lost the security detail and personal restrictions he had been under to protect him from the countless enemies he made as a CIA operative, choosing to be free from the organization's hold. It is later discovered that the organization was also protecting him from the rest of the world who were hunting the name Michael Westen.

Michael continued to work toward removing his burn notice and being reinstated in the CIA. Michael then approached CIA Agent Diego Garza, who became his point of contact for the CIA. Michael was also approached and later threatened by Tom Strickler, an "agent to the spies" with powerful connections. Tom had tried to remove Fiona from Michael's life, and Michael subsequently killed him. With Tom dead, the incident sparked a chain of events that led Diego to be murdered by Mason Gilroy, a former MI6 spy and freelance black ops psychopath. Michael ended up working with Gilroy to find out his plan. Michael eventually found out that Gilroy was working on securing the release of a high-risk fugitive named Simon Escher. Gilroy succeeded in freeing him but is later killed by Simon. In another revelation, Simon was the one responsible for the actions that got blamed on Michael when he was burned as Simon's profile was transferred to Michael. Simon forced Michael to bring Management to Miami but ends up being recaptured again when Michael overtook him.

After initially being taken away by the authorities, Michael is taken into Management's custody by use of their high-level government contacts. A member of the organization named Vaughn convinces Michael about a group of people in the world who are plotting assassinations, political coups, funding terrorist organizations, and genocide, and are using the terrible effects of such actions to greatly profit. Michael agrees to help him to stop the people that broke Simon out of prison. During the process of investigating, Michael accidentally burns a spy named Jesse Porter.

Despite the objection from Fiona and his mother, Michael kept a secret from Jesse about his role in destroying his life. Later, Jesse discovered Michael's deception and vowed revenge. Just before Jessie found out, Michael found a close link to the organization behind Simon and a mysterious book code contained within an out-of-print family bible: power-broker and billionaire CEO of Drake Technologies John Barrett. Michael offered to trade him the stolen bible in exchange for shedding some light on who he's up against and what the bible (as a book code) decrypts – the true identities of the organization that burned Michael. Management– the people who burned him– are hidden within the United States government, private-military corporations, and various other powerful organizations. Barrett planned on recruiting Michael to help him eliminate them. During the exchange of the case, Michael was shot by Jesse during a confrontation with Vaughn's and Barrett's teams. Michael, bleeding, was taken by Barrett. Michael then caused the car he was in to crash, leaving Barrett dead. Michael survives the accident and manages to crawl out of the wreckage. With Michael bleeding out and unconscious, someone steals the case.

Michael eventually recovered from his injuries. With the help of Fiona, Sam, and Jesse, Michael was able to recover the information on Management. Michael and Jessie turned over the flash drive to Jesse's old CIA handler Marv in exchange for Michael testifying to everything he knows about the organization. Seconds after the handoff Marv is killed by men posing as Homeland Security agents and the flash drive is stolen by Tyler Brennen, an enemy Michael made during the second season, who dislikes him even more after their next encounter in season three, and is one of the most intelligent villains he has encountered. Brennen, threatening to expose Michael's betrayal to Vaughn, blackmailed Michael into killing the people on the list who burned him. Brennen is murdered by Larry Sizemore who was recruited by Brennan to be Michael's partner for the killings. Michael was able to defeat Larry, but Vaughn learned of Michael's betrayal. Vaughn and his team go after Michael and those around him but are arrested. Michael was then taken by two mysterious men to Washington, D.C., and was met by an unknown acquaintance. The unknown acquaintance turns out to be Raines, Michael's former recruiter, who helps Michael hunt down every member of the organization in an attempt to get Michael un-burned. After Michael has successfully eliminated every member, another spy he had been working with, his handler, Max, is murdered and Michael is framed for the murder. Agent Pearce, who's been sent by the CIA to investigate Max's murder, serves as Michael's new agency contact. Michael must do what he can to aid the CIA's investigation while keeping the evidence from leading to his doorstep. It clues back to him and Pearce takes him in.

After he discovers the killer is a Romanian named Tavian Korzha the CIA lets Michael talk to him and he throws himself off a 5-story unfinished parking structure. Larry comes back and kidnaps a psychiatrist named Anson Fullerton, holding his wife hostage, forcing Michael to help him break into the British consulate, frame several British government personnel, and gain two million dollars. Larry reveals that he plans on killing Michael after Fi and Sam find Anson's wife had been blown up. Fiona plants a small explosive to kill Larry. The building explodes from the bottom, killing two security guards inside. It turns out that Anson planted the bomb and framed Fi. He is the co-founder of the organization that burned Michael and threatened to have the CIA and MI6 after Fi if Michael does not do his dirty work. It is revealed that later in his life, Michael's father met Anson and admitted his sorrow that he never got the chance to apologize to his son. Anson used him to gain information on Michael, and when Frank became suspicious, Anson arranged for his death.

Eventually, Fiona grows tired of Michael working for Anson and turns herself in to the FBI when Anson tries to get Michael to burn a CIA operations team for him. Michael arrives just as Fiona surrenders. Michael becomes enraged and chases Anson to a chemical plant in the Florida Keys. Anson outwits Michael by rigging the building to explode and attaching the detonator to a dead-man switch. Michael again vows to go after Anson and bring him in dead or alive, despite the support of Agent Pierce and the CIA.

By working with Rebecca, Anson's partner, who was also blackmailed by Anson, he tracks Anson down to Atlantic City and goes after him with Jessie, Pearce, and Nate. Michael's life takes a further turn for the worse when Nate is killed during Anson's assassination. As such, Michael, Madeline, Sam, Fiona, and Jesse are all hell-bent on exacting revenge for Nate's murder.

Eventually, Michael, with his former mentor Tom Card helping him, tracks Nate's killer, Tyler Gray, to Panama. After Michael successfully captures him, Gray reveals Card was the one who pulled the strings behind Anson's murder, since Card had been working with Anson and Card decided to kill Anson to keep him from talking. The mission to Panama was supposed to be a suicide mission for Michael and his friends. After barely escaping Card's air strike, Michael and the others attempt to get back to Miami, all the while learning that Gray had been lied to by Card about what he was told about Michael. After realizing Michael wasn't the person he was told, Gray agrees to help him take down Card.

Returning to Miami, Gray assists Michael in gathering intel on Card, but when Card discovers Gray's betrayal, Card fatally shoots Gray, makes it look like a struggle, and tries to convince Michael that they can do "great things" and has always been proud of him. However, Michael, unable to forgive Card for what he did and knowing what he's capable of, shoots Card through the head, killing him in cold blood. With the help of his friends, they barely escape as Olivia Riley, a ruthless agent for the CIA who "wrote the book on counterintelligence" goes after them and swears she will not stop until they are all dead.

Knowing they can't stay in the country anymore, Michael and the others (including Madeline) all attempt to leave the country with the help of Calvin Schmidt, a smuggler, but Riley tracks them down. When Riley resorts to using drug cartels to take down Michael after several failed attempts, Michael asks an old friend, CSS Agent Jason Bly, to assist him in proving Riley's betrayal, only for Bly to die in the process, along with the evidence. Not wanting Bly to die for nothing, Michael plays a dangerous game of chicken with Riley and the Coast Guard, after which Riley backs down and surrenders her complicity to the CIA deputy chief. After several months, Michael's friends are released, but Michael had to make a deal to do so; going on a deep cover job to take down the leader of a terrorist organization, prompting Fi to be disgusted, stating Michael did what he wanted to and backs away, heart-broken, leaving Michael distraught.

During the 100th episode of the series, it is shown how Michael and Fiona first met as spies in Ireland. Michael is struggling to ensure his friends and family remain free of the agency's grasp on what is his final mission to clear his name. Slowly but surely Michael begins to lose himself and a firm grip on his morals, succumbing to the mission. He proves this by sleeping with Sonya and killing an old friend of his. When Michael discovers that the CIA put Simon in charge of the capture team, he begins to question their beliefs. Michael kills Simon just as the capture team's backup arrives, and decides to protect James. He admits his deception to James, who is angry, but has the plan to continue his organization by putting Michael and Sonya in charge, and allowing Michael to "capture" him. Michael's friends refuse to believe he's given up on the CIA and form a plan to abduct him, but he fights against Sam and warns them to stay out of his way. Fearing he's lost his integrity, Fiona tracks Michael to the site for James' "capture".

Sonya tells Michael that if Fi doesn't leave, Sonya will have her killed. Michael hesitates but shoots Sonya before she can kill Fiona. James witnesses this from a helicopter and orders his men to kill Michael and Fiona. Sam and Jesse help Michael and Fiona escape, and they go on the offensive, tracking down a data center used by James' organization and stealing data that they could then use to unravel the entire organization. James arrives to confront them, threatening to have Madeline killed; however, Madeline sacrifices herself to kill James' hit squad and protect Jesse and Charlie. In the shootout, James is killed, but charges in the building detonate and Michael and Fiona were considered dead in the explosion.

Unknown to the CIA, Michael and Fiona survived. Believed dead, they fled the United States with Charlie and settled down to raise him in peace and obscurity in Ireland.

=== Fiona Glenanne ===
Fiona Glenanne
- First appearance: "Pilot"
- Last appearance: "Reckoning"
- Portrayed by: Gabrielle Anwar

In-universe information
- Gender: Female
- Occupation: Freelance contractor, Weapons dealer, unlicensed bounty hunter, CIA intelligence asset, Former: Provisional IRA
- Family: Sean Glenanne (brother), Claire Glenanne (sister; deceased)
- Significant others: Michael Westen (boyfriend)
- Children: Charlie Westen (adoptive)
- Religion: Catholic
- Nationality: (Republic of Ireland) Irish

Fiona Glenanne played by Gabrielle Anwar works with Michael Westen, Sam Axe and, starting in season 4, Jesse Porter, doing odd jobs, as well as working as an unlicensed bounty hunter and arms dealer. She is shown to be an explosives expert, marksman, and a precision driver. Fiona first met Michael Westen when she was in Ireland with the IRA when he went undercover as Michael McBride. Despite their clashing personalities, the two eventually developed a romance, but it came to a sudden end when Michael left Fiona literally in the middle of the night, without a word because his cover was blown. Due to Michael not updating his emergency contact in years, Fiona picked up Michael in Miami after he was stranded there when he was burned because she was the only emergency contact, and she has since helped him numerous times in his various jobs. Now that she has encountered Michael again, Fiona makes efforts to pressure Michael into a more substantial relationship. Fiona also keeps in touch with Michael's mother, Madeline.

In the early part of season 2, Fiona starts dating a paramedic named Campbell, and whilst it is never admitted it is believed her main reason for dating him was to drive Michael crazy that she was no longer available. However the relationship ended when Campbell confronted Fiona about her lingering feelings for Michael, and she couldn't deny them.

In season 3, episode 8, Fiona has had enough of Michael and walks out. Refusing to appear at a monitoring job, she doesn't turn up for Michael for the first time in the series. The reason was over Michael's choice to get back into the spy trade. In the season 3 summer finale, it is revealed that Fiona has five brothers, including an older one named Sean, and a younger sister named Claire, who was killed in The Troubles.

Fiona tends to shoot (or blow up) first and ask questions later. Her preferred method is going in with guns blazing or IEDs exploding, and Michael frequently has to hold her back. After spending time taking care of a child in season 1, Fiona becomes especially upset when someone abuses or endangers children.

Fiona also has a certain vixen complex, frequently using her sex appeal to acquire information.

Series creator Matt Nix has said about the characters' relationship:

The thing about the relationship with Fiona is…they are two people who really don't have anybody else that they can be with. Anybody else is going to be afraid of what Michael does, and it sort of turns her on, and anybody else for Fiona is going to be uninteresting. He is attracted to her, but part of what we explore over the first season is that they really are attracted with each other, and yet there is a reason they broke up. She is an incredibly chaotic person who just thrives on disorder. Violence is foreplay for her.

In the pilot episode, she spoke with an Irish accent; starting with "Identity", she has consistently spoken with an American accent as part of her effort to fit in with the Miami scene.

=== Sam Axe ===
Samuel Axe
- Burn Notice character
- Bruce Campbell as Sam Axe
- First appearance: "Pilot"
- Last appearance: "Reckoning"
- Portrayed by: Bruce Campbell

In-universe information
- Alias: Charles "Chuck" Finley
- Occupation: Freelance independent contractor, CIA civilian intelligence asset, Former: Navy SEAL
- Spouse: Amanda (estranged)

Sam Axe played by Bruce Campbell served over 20 years as a U.S. Navy SEAL. Following the events revealed in Burn Notice: The Fall of Sam Axe, he was given a retirement with full benefits at the rank of Commander in February 2005. The retirement agreement was part of a graymail deal which kept the true events of potentially embarrassing Operation PROVIDE SUPPORT in Colombia a secret. The deal included a first-class airline ticket to the destination of his choice (he selected Miami), a change of clothing, and an ice-cold beer.

In Miami, Axe helps Michael Westen with freelance work, having known him since at least 1992, and a job they did together in Poland. Sam's value to Westen often involves his seemingly infinite list of contacts. With a low amount of cash to his name, Sam has a string of "sugar mommas" with whom he connects in exchange for shelter and spending money. Sam is Michael's best friend.

Sam frequently uses the cover name "Chuck Finley" after the California Angels pitcher, whom he frequently and successfully wagered upon; coincidentally it is also the name of a coworker of Bruce Campbell's father, who also was, according to The Press Democrat, once friends with the real-life baseball player.

=== Madeline Westen ===
Madeline Westen
- First appearance: "Pilot"
- Last appearance: "Reckoning"
- Created by: Matt Nix
- Portrayed by: Sharon Gless
- Cause of death: Altruistic suicide via Explosive Device

In-universe information
- Gender: Female
- Spouse: Frank Westen (deceased)
- Children: Michael, Nate (deceased)
- Relatives: Charlie Westen (grandchild)

Madeline Westen played by Sharon Gless is Michael Westen's mother. It is unclear how much Madeline knows about her son's life as a spy. All she seems to know is that he tends to be in a different city, in a different country, or generally in a different place and that he can not disclose where he is. Madeline is thrilled when Michael is back in Miami and hopes that he will stay. She occasionally asks him for help with her friends' problems.

Madeline's relationship with Michael has been tumultuous, and complicated by the fact that her husband, and the father of her children, regularly abused them. Madeline believes that Michael aggravated his father and that this was the reason for Michael's father's beatings. She later allowed Michael to join the military at 17 by forging his father's signature on his enlistment forms. Michael didn’t know this until she told him why she did it for many reasons. The first being that Michael was on the verge of going to jail, and the second being that his father would never allow it. Madeline has been angry at Michael for years for an assortment of reasons, such as not attending his father's funeral. Upon his arrival in Miami, she asked Michael to visit his grave in exchange for his father's vintage Dodge Charger.

Madeline keeps up with her son Michael's actions through his friend and ally Fiona Glenanne.

Throughout the series, Madeline has often been drawn into events in one way or another, which has made her more aware of what Michael and his friends are doing. In the pilot episode, Madeline is depicted as an unstable hypochondriac woman. This characterization was discarded in future episodes to be replaced by the more no-nonsense, self-supportive woman that she would remain for the rest of the series. This change is also characterized by the haircut she receives.

While she's still not "officially" told about Michael's position as a spy, she has actively helped out on occasions, such as assisting with surveillance in the season 3 episode "Friends Like These", or even successfully interrogating a captive about Michael's whereabouts in "The Hunter", while Fiona and Sam were still arguing about the best approach. She does not like the truth about Michael's life, and her fears are brought to light when she is forced to defend him in an FBI interrogation, in the third-season finale; the bureau questions her concerning the activities that got him burned, along with many other actions in his spy career. While she can deter Michael from returning, she is ultimately detained. However, when Michael disables Simon, both disappear and Madeline is freed, but she anguishes at the disappearance of her son.

In season 4, after former counterintelligence agent Jesse Porter joins the team, he moves in with Madeline. She begins to form a true friendship with Jesse and forms a mother-son-like bond with him. Knowing that her son accidentally burned Jesse, Madeline, like Fiona, expresses her dislike for all the lies that Michael continues to tell Jesse. At one point, she decides to go to Tampa to stay with a friend she doesn't really like, for fear of letting the truth slip out and of how Jesse's reaction if he found out.

Madeline is often critical of Michael's methodologies. But in Season 5, when Michael tells her that Anson Fullerton caused the heart attack that killed her husband, she implores Michael to "do whatever it takes" to bring Anson to justice.

In season 6, Madeline serves as Fiona's source on the outside when she needs assistance in getting things to help get her out of prison. Madeline then becomes greatly distraught and heartbroken after learning of her youngest son Nate Weston's death from Michael. Since then, she has come to blame Michael for his death, stating how Nate always idolized Michael and how Michael always held contempt for him. She felt Nate had no right to be out in the open with Michael and the others. Eventually, after getting answers over Nate's death from Card (who was really behind Nate's death), Madeline seems to have finally gotten over her strife towards Michael, stating that she needs to forgive him lest she regrets it in the future should she lose him, as she did with Nate.

In Season 7, Madeline gains custody of her grandson Charlie and begins to take care of him. She is targeted by Nate's former bookie but forces Fiona to make the bookie look corrupt by using his ledger to get him to leave Madeline alone. James also pays her an unannounced visit, causing Madeline to converse while holding him at gunpoint as James assures her that he only wishes to protect her and her grandson.

In the series finale, Madeline is forced to burn her house to the ground and go on the run with Fiona from James' men. After Michael, Sam and Fiona enter James' communication/relay center with the intent of gathering evidence to use against him, James sends his men to where Madeline, Jesse, and Charlie are hiding. Knowing that they don't stand a chance against James' men, and are only armed with a single C-4 charge (without a remote detonator), Madeline decides to sacrifice her life for Charlie's safety as well as Michael's. As Jesse and Charlie take cover, Madeline manually detonates the C-4, killing her and James' men instantly as they enter. Her last words are, "This one's for my boys."

In the series pilot, the actress wears a wig, but throughout the rest of the series, her real hair is featured.

=== Jesse Porter ===
Jesse Porter
- First appearance: "Friends and Enemies" (4.01)
- Portrayed by: Coby Bell

In-universe information
- Gender: Male
- Occupation: Freelance Independent Contractor, Private Security Operative, CIA Civilian Intelligence Asset, Former: CIFA/DIA Counter-Intelligence Agent
- Relatives: mother (unnamed, deceased)

Jesse Porter played by Coby Bell is a former Counterintelligence Field Activity/Defense Intelligence Agency agent introduced in the season four premiere. He had initially been stationed in the field, but his risky and impulsive tactical maneuvers led to his demotion to desk duty. Because Jesse researched the war-profiteering organization that Management was hunting, Michael was forced to unknowingly steal files using duplicates of Jesse's ID, unintentionally burning him. In the use of dramatic irony, the show's writers send Jesse to Michael for help to find out who has burned him. Michael accepts Jesse as a client, but Jesse's adamant search for the people who burned him leads the team to cover their part of the trail, lest he discovers Michael's role in it. Left with nothing, Jesse then moves into Madeline's newly converted garage apartment and thereafter becomes a member of Michael's team.

Jesse becomes fast friends with Fiona, with whom he shares a similar temperament and attitude toward their extra-legal activities; they are both firearm and explosives enthusiasts and have difficulty putting missions before people, being much more willing than Michael and Sam to drop everything and rush to a victim's aid. Additionally, Porter initially clashes with Sam, who is much more team-oriented due to his SEAL training and experience, frequently putting the two at odds over the best way to accomplish a mission. Porter quickly comes to respect Madeline, whose natural interest, rapport-building, and persistence he finds comparable to any counter-intelligence operative he's worked with. Despite his tendency to act as a 'lone wolf,' the team quickly comes to appreciate Jesse's support; like Michael, he is extremely well-rounded and competent in intelligence gathering, operating undercover, firearms, and explosives.

Because of the circumstances of his burning, his old handler Marv believes he is innocent and has been set up; this connection proves vital later in the season. Jesse makes contact with Marv, and convinces him to provide information about a failed safety-deposit box bank heist that he believes will help find the people he believes burned him; but in the box, they find only a book-cipher bible, which becomes a major story object.

In the lead-up to the mid-season finale, Jesse finds proof of Michael's involvement in his burning and confronts Fiona, whom he leaves alive, amid an operation to take down John Barrett, a major player in the organization that he was hunting. While Fiona, Sam, and Madeline are unsuccessful in convincing Jesse to forgive or work with Michael, he nonetheless appears at the meet and saves Michael from Barrett's men. The meeting ends with the bible cipher missing, and Barrett dead. Jesse later agrees to work with Michael and recover the book cipher for them. Surprisingly, Madeline brokers peace between Michael and Jesse, calling both 'my boys' and stating that they have to get past their mistakes; she appeals to their sense of family and forces both to look at the emotional pain their rift has caused the team, comparing it to ripping a family apart. With no way of making amends, and both Michael and Jesse appreciating the other's position, they reconcile and find common ground in helping Michael's 'clients'.

By the fifth season, Jesse has been reinstated into an official agency but finds the bureaucracy and red tape unbearable. He quits and begins working at a private security firm, where his position enables him to give Michael, Sam, and Fiona extra work.

== Foes ==
=== Jason Bly ===
Jason Bly
- First appearance: "Unpaid Debts" (1.06)
- Last appearance: "Game Change" (6.18)
- Portrayed by: Alex Carter

In-universe information
- Gender: Male
- Occupation: CSS Agent

Central Security Service Agent Jason Bly (Alex Carter) is assigned to Michael's case after Michael gained access to his burn notice and his FBI surveillance team is pulled. In the first season, Bly attempts to coerce Michael into giving up his attempts to return to the intelligence fold by harassing him and threatening his friends and family. Michael finally gets Bly to lay off by creating a file framing him for taking bribes, which he also uses to blackmail him into providing a copy of his classified dossier. In the second-season episode "Bad Breaks", Bly returns with enough blackmail material on Michael to force him to hand over Bly's file. Then Bly shows up at a bank where Michael is there helping the episode's client, and the two are taken hostage by a team of bank robbers and Bly is shot. After Michael treats his wound and foils the robbers, the two develop mutual respect. They exchange respective blackmail files and part ways on good terms.

In the sixth season, Bly returns as the lead interrogator handling Fiona's case. He also tries to convince Fiona that Michael did not survive an explosion and is "presumably deceased" during his interrogation. Bly also tries to get Fiona to sign a confession and attempts to "give her a deal", but Fiona looks very carefully at the evidence Bly presented to her and ultimately rejects his offer of a deal. In the season finale, Bly calls Michael and offers him protection as a witness in the investigation to stop the CIA investigation. Michael refuses the deal, but escalating pressure from Riley - including a cartel hit squad - results in Michael recontacting him with a new plan; proving Riley is selling out to the cartel and providing witness testimony. Michael can produce evidence by staking out a meeting between Riley and a cartel kingpin, but a marina guard (working for the cartel) throws a grenade into Bly's car, killing him and incinerating the evidence.

=== Phillip Cowan ===
Phillip Cowan
- First appearance: "Dead Drop" (1.11)
- Last appearance: "Dead Drop" (1.11)
- Portrayed by: Richard Schiff

In-universe information
- Gender: Male
- Occupation: NSA Operative

Phillip Cowan (Richard Schiff) is an operative of both the National Security Agency and the shadow organization run by "Management." Cowan is presumably responsible for Michael's burn notice because of false evidence he has gone "rogue." After Michael learns Cowan's identity, he gets his attention by persuading a Libyan spy (Marshall Manesh) to arrange for the Chief of Libya's secret police to send Cowan a fruit basket. He responds by sending a bureaucrat (Arye Gross) to meet with Michael about the possibility of rescinding his burn notice, but the man proves to be an assassin, instead. Once Michael foils the assassination attempt, Cowan agrees to meet with him at last. At the meeting, on a rooftop, Cowan reveals that he did burn Michael, but only on the orders of superiors, who act for "...something much, much bigger than us". Before he can explain further, he himself is assassinated by a sniper.

=== Carla Baxter ===
Carla Baxter
- First appearance: "Breaking and Entering" (2.01)
- Last appearance: "Lesser Evil" (2.16)
- Portrayed by: Tricia Helfer

In-universe information
- Gender: Female
- Occupation: Handler

"Carla Baxter" (Tricia Helfer) is the nom de guerre of a mid-ranking member of a mysterious and seemingly all-powerful shadow government organization called only "Management" that is apparently behind Michael's burn notice. In the second season, it is revealed that she ordered that Michael be burned so that she could use him for various black ops. Throughout the season, she forces Michael to perform a series of apparently unrelated errands for her, which he eventually learns are part of a planned assassination attempt. Before Michael can work to foil the assassination, someone beats him to the punch by killing the assassin and nearly killing Michael in separate explosions.

Although he initially suspects that Carla is responsible, Michael learns that she is just as much in the dark as he is; and she orders him to find out who was behind the bombings. Michael eventually discovers that the man responsible is Victor, a former employee of Carla's who has now gone rogue. However, rather than turning him in, Michael decides to team up with him to get Carla taken out of the picture by her superiors, by revealing her abuse of the organization's resources for personal gain. Carla, however, discovers their plan by shooting Victor and trapping him and Michael aboard Victor's houseboat. From the shore, Carla offers Michael a choice: either take credit for Victor's murder, becoming a "hero" in the eyes of Management and covering up Carla's transgressions, or she’ll blow up the boat and report that Michael was the one behind the recent upsets. Michael refuses to concede. Just before Carla pushes her detonator, she is killed by Fiona with a sniper rifle.

=== Dead Larry ===
Larry Sizemore
- First appearance: "Double Booked" (2.08)
- Last appearance: "Psychological Warfare" (7.07)
- Portrayed by: Tim Matheson

In-universe information
- Aliases: Larry Garber, Larry Baruchel
- Nickname: "Dead" Larry
- Gender: Male
- Occupation: Former spy, assassin

"Dead" Larry Sizemore (Tim Matheson) is an old friend and somewhat enemy of Michael. He was a covert operative; who worked with Michael during his spy days in Serbia and Russia until he became disillusioned with his government and even tried to persuade Michael that it was their government that burned him. By nature, Larry is outwardly friendly and cordial but is extremely violent, hot-tempered, ruthless, and sociopathic. During the crazy times in Serbia, they were serving in, Larry seemed somewhat sane in comparison. Larry eventually saw their government superiors as restrictive and even traitorous towards their operatives, so he decided to enter "retirement" by walking into an oil refinery right before it exploded as witnessed by 15 others. Presumed dead, Larry became a contract killer. After several terrorist attacks were pinned on Michael, Larry came to believe that Michael had finally adopted his philosophy on life and business.

In the second season's "Double Booked", the son of a wealthy socialite plotted to kill his stepmother so he could inherit his family's fortune. Michael quickly spoiled the contract hit by impersonating Larry and pressuring the son into backing out of the assassination. Recognizing what Michael had done, Larry turned around and impersonated "Michael Westen" to intimidate the son into continuing with the operation, threatening to make him a "Dead-ee" (a term that Larry coined for targets). With the assistance of Michael and his allies, however, the assassination was ultimately foiled. But when Michael attempts to take out Larry while the son pretended to pay for the hit, he fails to get a clear shot, allowing Larry to kill the son and then escape.

In the third season's "Enemies Closer", Larry returned to Miami with members of a vicious Mexican drug cartel on his trail. He killed would-be assassin Justino in Michael's flat, using the body, and the fact that he used "Michael Westen" as an alias to force them to help. He had also adopted the persona "Larry Garber" after he killed the man and used his identity to launder money. Almost succeeding to drive Michael from Sam and Fiona by deflecting his and their calls, Michael worked out Larry's endgame and set Larry up as an innocent civilian who called the police after finding evidence of money laundering. Larry, due to his investments, could not simply kill Michael and disappear so he was forced to cooperate with the police.

In the fourth season's "Out of the Fire", Larry once again returned to trouble Michael's life working in conjunction with Tyler Brennen, the "owner" of the Management organization's NOC list. Larry and Michael have paired up again for the first time in years to assassinate everyone on the list; starting with IMF agent Albert Machado. Michael attempts to buy time by having Machado kidnapped rather than killed but Larry kills Machado anyway. While furious, Michael tried to deceive Larry into helping him, Sam, Fiona, and Jesse steal Brennen's evidence and then continue hunting down Management. At a rendezvous point, Larry, having considered Michael's offer, made a move that benefitted only him; killing Brennan. This forced Michael to work with Larry to regain some form of leverage, but Michael's team outmaneuvered Larry, with Michael retrieving the flash drive and leaving Larry with nothing but a murder charge.

In the fifth season's mid-finale "Dead to Rights", Larry reappears at Michael's loft with Anson Fullerton as a hostage to use for high-security clearance to a local British consulate. Larry has Anson's wife hostage with a bomb placed around her neck, threatening to kill her unless Michael and Anson aid him in robbing the consulate for several million dollars. Since he had to bribe his way out of the prison Michael sent him which has exhausted all of the fortunes he had in escrow and also murdered an Albanian warden to ensure his escape, Larry no longer treats Michael even remotely amicably. Larry fakes a chemical exposure alert on the floor below the British Consulate to seal off the wing. He forces Michael to replace a document that would have Larry gain millions in land contracts. In the meantime, he hacks building security to force Fiona, Sam, and Anson to back off. Unusually, he happens to have killed his leverage (Anson's wife) before the job was done. Fiona locates the office where Larry is monitoring security and places an RDX bomb on the bulletproof window. Luring him with a few sniper shots, she sets off a bomb near the room he is in, presumably killing him along with two security guards after a secondary bomb placed by Anson is set off (though a newspaper headline shown later in the episode lists only two casualties). Unknown to him, Larry's actions were the catalyst of Anson's exploitation of Fiona to cause the consulate's destruction as leverage against Michael.

In the seventh season's "Psychological Warfare", Larry appears in Michael's hallucinations while Michael is being interrogated by the organization he agreed to dismantle. Drugged and forced to imagine Larry inside his head, it is revealed that Michael and Larry were betrayed by an asset on their last mission together, which led to Michael destroying the building that contained the asset. However, Larry forces Michael to admit that there were innocent people inside the building as well and that they burnt to death because he couldn't do the mission properly as he could have. Michael tearfully says that he became scared of what he had done and feared that he was becoming like Larry, leading to his departure from working with him ever again.

Both Sam and Fiona hate Larry because they believe that he is a poor influence on Michael. Though they share a mutually antagonistic relationship, Sam and Larry know each other very well and could therefore have had dealings with one another in the past. Michael has admitted that there is a small part of him that is like Larry, but that this part grows smaller the longer he is around his friends. For his part, Larry seems to have slightly paternal feelings for Michael and is constantly frustrated by his former comrade's reluctance to embrace the darker side of his personality. Larry is the longest-recurring villain outside of major antagonists.

=== Tyler Brennen ===
Tyler Brennen
- First appearance: "Sins of Omission" (2.15)
- Last appearance: "Out of the Fire" (4.17)
- Portrayed by: Jay Karnes

In-universe information
- Gender: Male
- Occupation: Former spy, Arms Dealer, "Full-time sociopath"
- Children: Annabelle Brennen (daughter)

Tyler Brennen (Jay Karnes) was a ruthless gunrunner and former military intelligence operative. He is the first villain-of-the-week to become a recurring character and the first person whom Michael can never smooth-talk into doing anything.

In the season two episode "Sins of Omission", he kidnaps the young son of the professional thief (and Michael's former fiancée) Samantha Kees (Dina Meyer) to force her to steal the MacGuffin-of-the-week, which he expects will yield enough money to retire. Michael, dispensing with the use of cover identities and approaching Brennen as himself, frees Samantha's son and tricks Brennen into letting him return the item to its rightful owner, forcing Brennen to go on the run from his buyers.

In the third-season episode "End Run", he returns, having dispatched his pursuers by a particularly clever ruse. He poses as an investor in the latest business venture of Michael's younger brother Nate. Brennen tells Michael he will have Nate killed if Michael does not agree to help him. Although Michael gains access to the device, he bluffs Brennen into believing that he has drained Brennen's offshore accounts and sent a hitman to kill his daughter. Brennen releases Nate and leaves empty-handed, swearing vengeance.

In the fourth season, Brennen returns. In the episode "Dead or Alive", Brennen has Marv (Jesse's former handler) killed and the flash drive that Michael and Jesse had stolen then smiles playfully at Michael from the fleeing vehicle. In the following episode "Out of the Fire", Brennen blackmails Michael into assassinating members of Management and framing a terrorist group. He also hires "Dead" Larry to assist. When Michael and Larry return from the first job at a rendezvous point, Brennen was pouring glasses of champagne in celebration of the victory but Larry double-crosses Brennen and kills him.

Brennen is the second longest recurring villain (outside main antagonist) next to Larry.

=== Michelle Paxson ===
Michelle Paxson
- First appearance: "Question and Answer" (3.02)
- Last appearance: "Fearless Leader" (3.04)
- Portrayed by: Moon Bloodgood

In-universe information
- Gender: Female
- Occupation: Miami Police Detective

Miami Police Detective Michelle Paxson (Moon Bloodgood) appeared at the start of the third season almost immediately after Michael opted out of protection from "Management". Paxson had noticed shady activity from Michael, Fiona and Sam, and worked to shut down their operation. in "End Run", Michael arranges for evidence to show himself connected to a Mayors Aide to come to light. Paxsons partner Detective Lopez spends three hours interrogating the aide because of this, resulting in the Mayor personally having Lopez suspended. Despite having absolutely no proof that Michael was responsible (as the bank claimed it was an error), Paxson threatens Michael that she can "give as good as i get." In the episode "Fearless Leader", Michael and the others find one of the most dangerous men in Miami and plan to hand him over to Paxson, letting her take credit for the collar whilst also planting evidence that connected him to all the crimes Paxson was accusing Michael of. In exchange, Paxson agrees to drop the investigation and let Michael and his team operate relatively freely, with Michael ultimately convincing her "we're on the same side". Until the sixth season, she was the only antagonist in official authority whom Michael had faced.

=== Tom Strickler ===
Tom Strickler
- First appearance: "The Hunter" (3.06)
- Last appearance: "Long Way Back" (3.09)
- Portrayed by: Ben Shenkman

In-universe information
- Gender: Male
- Occupation: "Agent" to the Spies

Tom Strickler (Ben Shenkman) is an "Agent to the Spies" in the third season.

Introduced in the episode "The Hunter", he tries to recruit Michael with gifts such as a basket of yogurt and lotion delivered by a sexy masseuse. Michael refuses each time, insisting that he is not a mercenary and is not interested in Strickler's money. Strickler seems to know every detail of Michael's life and keeps tabs on Sam and Fiona as well. He is powerfully connected and appears to be able to control just about anyone, including government agencies. He is even able to affect movement on Michael's burn notice and is thus able to get Michael to do some questionable projects in exchange for getting the burn lifted. A man with a silver tongue, he can convince Michael to do things the same way Michael does with everyone else. In the episode "Shot in the Dark", Michael agrees to work with Strickler only to get his old job back, which causes Fiona to be uncomfortable with Michael working with a "weasel", and she threatens to leave for Ireland.

In the mid-season finale "Long Way Back", Strickler tells Michael that Fiona's influence on Michael's life is "holding him back" and that he has arranged to have her kidnapped and sent back to Ireland where her enemies are waiting. Michael kills a hostile Strickler and rescues Fiona, leaving Strickler's body with Fiona's kidnappers.

=== Mason Gilroy ===
Mason Gilroy
- First appearance: "Friendly Fire" (3.11)
- Last appearance: "Good Intentions" (3.15)
- Portrayed by: Chris Vance

In-universe information
- Gender: Male
- Occupation: Freelance Psychopath

Gilroy (Chris Vance) is a former MI6 agent who freelanced all over the world and worked for Tom Strickler. Before Strickler was killed, both were working on "secret business". Gilroy has no problem killing innocent people and rather enjoys it, going as far as to kill his teammates if they fail during a mission (like when he killed "Claude" due to "complications from [an] injury" despite the thief having only broken his ankle). He is rather good at what he does, committing violent acts and killing people without getting caught or being blamed for it. Michael figures out who he is when Gilroy reenacts his crimes to Michael. He is approached by Michael to join him on his "secret job" but turns Michael away, saying he is not good enough for his job, after seeing Michael pull off a job, he is impressed and decides to hire Michael.

After performing some errands for Gilroy and doing some investigative work of his own, Michael discovers that Gilroy's operation in Miami involves a plane heading from Chile to Poland that's transporting an extremely high-risk prisoner to which Gilroy intercepts the plane. After diverting the plane off course, he was paid 10 million dollars for securing the release of the prisoner, which turns out to be Simon Escher. By the time Michael arrived, Gilroy had been shot in the abdomen, strapped to an explosive device, and handcuffed to the steering wheel of his vehicle. After briefly speaking with Michael and ruefully acknowledging that he had been manipulated and betrayed, Gilroy dies when the explosive device detonates and the vehicle explodes.

=== Simon Escher ===
Simon Escher
- First appearance: "Good Intentions" (3.15) (cameo) "Devil You Know" (3.16) (official)
- Last appearance: "Tipping Point" (7.11)
- Portrayed by: Garret Dillahunt

In-universe information
- Gender: Male
- Occupation: Rogue Operative

Simon (Garret Dillahunt) is the ace professional assassin/operative for Management before Michael is "burned". He is responsible for numerous bombings, arsons, kidnappings, and assassinations for the Management organization.

Sometime before the series, he went insane and began carrying out terrorist attacks for his interests. When Simon became a too high risk for "the powers that be" to continue doing business with, they attempted to have him killed but failed, which led to Simon's vendetta against Management. Using his high-ranking access, he compiled a list of names, aliases, occupations, and locations of all of the Management members as an insurance policy via a book code of the names in the Escher family Bible, which can only be decrypted by a second portion of the code. Realizing he was too small a cog in the machine to strike at, he enlisted the help of private-sector corporation Drake Technologies CEO John Barrett for assistance in taking his former employers out. But he was captured and taken into exile as a super-max prisoner before he could advance his plan further than passing the encoded NOC-List to Barrett. When Management burned skilled and talented spy Michael Westen with all of Simon's crimes to secure his dismissal, Simon somehow discovered this information and became obsessed with Michael for taking the "credit for his work".

In the third season, $10 million was offered to get Simon out of the country. Both freelance spy-wrangler Tom Strickler and professional assassin Mason Gilroy planned to have Simon broken out of the super-max prison. After Michael gunned down Strickler, Gilroy took it upon himself to break Simon out for the promised price tag and ultimately forced Michael to assist in the dangerous jailbreak. Once the plane's pilots were bribed to stop at Miami, Simon turned on Gilroy by shooting him in the abdomen and strapping him to an explosive device that blew him up inside of his car.

In the season finale "Devil You Know", Simon is now a free man and on the loose once again and first turned his attention to Michael by forcing him to lure Management to Miami. During a meeting between Michael and Management atop a helipad, Simon detonated a bomb that blew up the helicopter and stormed the rooftop under a police officer disguise. He killed several of Management's bodyguards and captured the old man but Michael barely escaped death by sliding down a construction chute. Restraining Management inside the back of an ambulance that served as his escape vehicle to flee the scene of the bombings, Michael hijacked another car and crashed into Simon's ambulance. After a struggle between Simon and Michael, Simon is once again captured, but promised Michael that he'd soon "end up just like [Simon]".

In the fourth season, Simon is once again a prisoner of Management. When Michael requested he returned to Miami for interrogation about who his benefactor was, Simon broke free of his restraints and attacked Michael, hurling them both out of a window and onto a deck. There, he told Michael of the location of a buried stash he had hidden inside a cemetery containing an audio tape that implicated "Vaughn" in Michael's burn notice. He also led Michael and his allies to Barrett.

In the final season episode "Tipping Point", Simon reappears after it is revealed that the CIA has been using him for off-the-books missions for two years, causing Michael to ultimately and finally lose all faith in the CIA. He attempts to work with Michael, but Michael eventually stabs and kills him after going into a rage.

=== Vaughn Anderson ===
Vaughn Anderson
- First appearance: "Friends and Enemies" (4.01)
- Last appearance: "Acceptable Loss" (5.17)
- Portrayed by: Robert Wisdom

In-universe information
- Gender: Male
- Occupation: Handler

Vaughn Anderson (Robert Wisdom) is a high-ranking and connected member of Management who serves as Michael's point of contact. It is implied he is the replacement for Carla. He explains to Michael that there is a person or organization orchestrating wars internationally for-profit and shows him a dossier containing seemingly unrelated documents. Michael can see the "big picture" from the documents and identifies a man, Gregory Hart (Michael Ironside), as an arms dealer supplying both sides of the war. Vaughn and Michael track Hart using his "sat phone" to apprehend him. When Vaughn and Michael question him, he refuses to share any information. Vaughn responds by shooting him in the leg. Before they can extract any information, a Predator drone destroys the camp, wounding Vaughn in the process. Without any other leads, Vaughn asks Michael to retrieve classified information using a copy of counter-intelligence operative Jesse Porter's security pass, which ultimately ends in Jesse being "burned" by his superiors in the same fashion as Michael.

As Michael and his team slowly unravel the conspiracy, tensions between Vaughn and Michael become strained; as Vaughn vocally is against the softer side of Michael's methods of solving problems, preferring intimidation and torture to Michael's preference for manipulation and stealth. He is eventually convinced to return former terrorist/assassin Simon Escher—once again in the custody of Management—to Miami for questioning, in which Simon stages an apparent escape to get a few seconds with Michael away from the cameras. His information directs Michael to a buried tape recording marked "Berlin 2007". The tape from Simon's box implicates Vaughn in Michael's burn notice, as well as efforts to assassinate Simon. When Michael seems to go rogue, Vaughn attempts to manipulate Fiona into getting Michael back on the side of Management; which ultimately fails. This leads to Vaughn and other Management commandos storming the pier with guns blazing where Michael is meeting with John Barrett: a decision that nearly gets Michael killed, results in the death of their only lead and the loss of the Bible containing the names, aliases, and locations of all Management members.

While on the surface Vaughn is a friendlier and more positive representative of Management than Carla, he is also extremely ruthless and makes it known he will commit atrocities himself to prevent even larger-scale acts of destruction. He lies to Michael about not being involved in his burn notice, though Simon's tape contradicts this. His first reaction to the "accidental" burning of Jesse is to have him captured and hauled away to the same super-max prison Simon is held in. And he seems to regularly have information that he does not share with Michael. In the episode "Eyes Open", Vaughn promises to leave Miami because of his failure during Michael's sting operation but says he still has "big plans" for Michael, suggesting he will return at some point down the road.

In the fourth-season finale "Last Stand", Vaughn and numerous mercenaries of "Management" return to Miami, having been alerted by an anonymous email from the now-deceased Tyler Brennen. He and his men are determined to retrieve the contents of Simon's Bible at any cost. Vaughn makes it clear to Michael immediately that he is finished "playing nice" with him, and is now here to do what is necessary to accomplish his task. Vaughn and his army corner Michael, Fiona, and Jesse in an abandoned building. Through his various connections in Management and the apprehension of Madeline, he gives them two options: surrender or death. With Jesse's leg badly wounded, Michael opts to divert the forces while Fiona and Jesse escape; Fiona returns to Michael, and they are saved from their suicidal mission by a military platoon directed by Sam and authorized by Congressman Cowley, who was promised the flash drive. Vaughn is outgunned and arrested.

Despite having been sent to Guantanamo for nine months, Anson Fullerton uses Vaughn's accounts to begin the restoration of the organization, something Michael picks up on while in Washington. Determined to get answers, Michael gets Vaughn transferred in-state for interrogation. While resistant at first to reveal his secrets, Michael forces him to reveal them by threatening to let Vaughn's enemies get close to him.

=== John Barrett ===
John Barrett
- First appearance: "Blind Spot" (4.11)
- Last appearance: "Guilty as Charged" (4.12)
- Portrayed by: Robert Patrick

In-universe information
- Gender: Male
- Occupation: International Power Player, Merchant of Death
- Spouse: Wife

John Barrett (Robert Patrick) was the powerful and wealthy CEO of international telecom company Drake Technologies that has numerous high-profile connections abroad and involved in the military–industrial complex with several US allies. Although he appears in the fourth season, his character was alluded to several times in the third season.

When Simon Escher compiled a complete file on Management's organization, Barrett collaborated with his powerful allies and such capabilities. But with Simon detained and his cypher-key bible locked in a safety deposit box, Barrett had his associates make their own moves. In the third season, he offered $10 million to get Simon out of the country which motivated both spy-wrangler Tom Strickler and career assassin Mason Gilroy to break Simon out for the price-tag promise. Now a free man and on the loose once again, Simon used his benefactor's resources to procure two bombs.

In the fourth season, Barrett planned to have a team of freelance thieves rob the safety-deposit box and recover the Bible, but they failed the operation and were caught. So he hired assassin "Kendra" to kill the thieves for their failure. When Michael Weston and Jesse Porter captured "Kendra" and learned of her part in the conspiracy, the two burned spies broke into the safety-deposit box and stole the bible and learn that it was Simon's book code.

In the episode "Blind Spot", Barrett was contacted, while in New York City, by Michael and Jesse to offer the Bible in exchange for answering their questions about the contents. While hesitant to admit his complicity, he sent a Colonel to retrieve the book which they anticipated and countered. Barrett then personally arrived to Miami with an effective army to negotiate with Michael for the Bible.

In the mid-season finale "Guilty as Charged", Michael infiltrated Barrett's highly secure mansion to secure a meeting. At a harbor, Barrett and several of his mercenaries arrived in black SUVs. After obtaining the Bible and confirming authenticity, Barrett explained how he was Simon's unofficial partner and his intentions of eliminating the Management members. He also showed interest in recruiting Michael to achieve this goal. But the deal went bad when Barrett was notified that "Vaughn" and other Management mercenaries approached the pier in a convoy of vehicles and began a shoot-out with Barrett's mercenaries. As a full-scale war erupted on the harbor, Barrett ordered a mercenary to capture Michael for interrogation. While Jesse's timely intervention prevented Barrett's two-man team from taking Michael, the distraction left Michael vulnerable to Barrett. Weakened and bleeding out, Michael was snatched by Barrett and thrown into the passenger seat of the SUV. Barrett drove the vehicle through the war zone until they were on the open road again. Nearly unconscious, Michael forced the steering wheel into a sharp turn that flipped the vehicle. The resulting crash left Barrett dead, Michael gravely injured, and the bible lost.

After his death, the media has gotten a hold of his activities as many international powers had taken Drake Technologies down after the revelations of their international crimes.

=== Anson Fullerton ===
Anson Fullerton
- First appearance: "Dead to Rights" (5.12)
- Last appearance: "Shock Wave" (6.6)
- Portrayed by: Jere Burns

In-universe information
- Gender: Male
- Occupation: DIA psychiatrist, Criminal syndicate

Anson Fullerton (Jere Burns) was the original leader of the organization that burned Michael, and the final member of that group to be revealed. He is effectively the main antagonist of the series. He and Management started the organization together when Anson was evaluating burned spies as a psychiatrist for the Defense Intelligence Agency.

In the fifth season's first half, Anson had gone underground during Michael's hunt for the Management organization. But he resurfaced after Max and Michael began researching evidence of more agents, killing the former and framing the latter. With the cover-up foiled, he then orchestrated a plot to gain leverage on Michael: tricking Fiona into thinking she killed two innocent people and recording her confession to blackmail Michael into continuing to work for him. Having written Michael's psychological evaluation and possessing knowledge of his family, he meticulously locks out any moves Michael could use on him to exonerate Fiona.

In the fifth season's second half, Anson's first mission is to have Michael use his clearance to wipe all traces of him from the CIA's database with a specialized virus. At the same time, he employs Benny (Madeline's new boyfriend) to surveil Michael's team. Just as Michael and Madeline determine Benny is unwillingly complicit, Anson sends a bomb to Benny's house that kills him in front of them. Meeting with Anson revealed Benny was always an asset, having been provided with all the background information of Madeline to provide her a "soulmate". Anson next assigns Jesse and Fiona to the Caymans to free up 20 million dollars from his flagged account. When Beatriz (Sam's old friend) is hunted by an outed Russian operative, Sam proposes to bring in Anson to identify and analyze the agent, which Anson grudgingly does as Michael notes how he would go to any lengths to save his friends, including dying or being imprisoned. Anson requires Michael's full disclosure of his mindset during the operation in return, and he also provides the insight to allow for the safe return of Beatriz. However, Anson reveals the fact that Michael's father was ultimately remorseful about his actions toward his family during his reevaluation by Anson. But once he became suspicious of Anson's operation, he was poisoned to induce cardiac arrest. Anson also locks out Sam from talking to the FBI deputy director, framing him as a Russian operative.

In the season finale, Anson's endgame is revealed: to rebuild the organization through the logistical infrastructure that was not dismantled in the CIA operation. Needing operatives to restart his work, Anson enlists Michael to frame Pearce and a visiting CIA team for embezzlement and have them burned. Unbeknownst to Michael, he planted Rebecca as a mole onto the team to kill Jesse and their target with a plane bomb to limit Michael's options in retrieving the situation without burning anyone. Displeased with Michael's ultimate failure to burn the operatives, Anson meets up with Rebecca and flees. Anson calls Michael but all Michael says is "see you in hell". With Fiona having turned herself in to the FBI, Anson lost any leverage he had over Michael though he remained at large.

At the start of the sixth season, Michael manages to convince Pearce of Anson's schemes that landed Fiona in prison. Tracking Anson to a chemical plant, Michael catches and fights with him just as Anson is about to board a boat and flee the country. But Anson reveals a remote trigger for a bomb inside the plant, and Michael regrettably has to release him as Sam and Pearce are still inside the plant. After Michael turned Rebecca against Anson, he is finally caught by Nate but both of them are killed by a sniper (Tyler Gray under Tom Card's orders) soon after.

=== Tom Card ===
Tom Card
- First appearance: "Mixed Messages" (6.02)
- Last appearance: "Means & Ends" (6.12)
- Portrayed by: John C. McGinley

In-universe information
- Gender: Male
- Occupation: CIA & DEA operative, former CIA Trainer

Tom Card (John C. McGinley) is Michael's former CIA trainer/mentor and a traitor. He initially reappears in Michael's life needing help in disrupting a large drug cartel operating in Miami, in exchange for which he will pull some strings to get Michael granted rights to visit Fiona in prison. Later, he makes a deal with Fiona to get her released without the threat of extradition in exchange for her revealing her former arms dealer. Fiona is initially cold toward Card when it is discovered that he was behind her and Michael breaking up years ago in Ireland. But when Card reveals that Michael's cover was about to be blown due to his love for Fiona, she realizes that Card's actions effectively saved both of their lives. In the summer finale, Card tracks down Tyler Gray, assassin to Anson and Nate, in Panama. Sending Michael and his team with an agent and a series of high-tech equipment on an off-the-books mission, he is forced to share with Madeline whatever he knows about Nate and Michael. Despite telling Madeline that Michael is like a son to him, it is revealed that Card set up the Panama operation to be a suicide mission for Michael, having hired Gray and sent an F-18 to destroy everyone involved in the mission. Michael then confronts him back in Miami, and after Card shoots Gray, Michael shoots Card in the head.

=== Olivia Riley ===
Olivia Riley
- First appearance: "Over The Line" (6.13)
- Last appearance: "Game Change" (6.18)
- Portrayed by: Sonja Sohn

In-universe information
- Gender: female
- Occupation: CIA Counterintelligence Agent

According to Jesse and Michael, Riley (Sonja Sohn) is the ruthless counterintelligence agent for the CIA who "wrote the book on counterintelligence". After Michael kills Card in cold blood, Riley is the first responder to the scene, capably countering effectively all of Michael's plans and misdirections. While Michael was able to capture Riley and tried to explain his side of the story, she was unconvinced and unmoved even after Michael let her go, swearing she will hunt Michael to "the ends of the Earth", and will do it at all costs. With Michael and his team in the wind, she focuses her attention on Madeline and almost catches her too, resulting in Michael including Madeline in the team's escape plans.

After her attempts to capture Michael and his team eventually fail, Riley gets desperate and starts over-reaching by dealing with a drug cartel and offering them a "free pass" from prosecution if they can take out Michael. Michael surreptitiously boards the yacht where Riley is meeting the cartel kingpin, and plays chicken with the Coast Guard, after which Riley backs down and surrenders her complicity to the CIA deputy chief. It is presumed that she was sent to prison for her actions, as the character never appears again.

=== Randall Burke ===
Randall Burke
- First appearance: "New Deal" (7.1)
- Last appearance: "Brothers in Arms" (7.4)
- Portrayed by: Adrian Pasdar

In-universe information
- Gender: male
- Occupation: International terrorist

Randall Burke (Adrian Pasdar), according to CIA Agent Andrew Strong, is the leader of an international terror ring. He becomes Michael's undercover "assignment" in a deal that Michael makes with Strong to keep himself, Maddie and his friends out of Federal prison. Michael encounters Burke in the Dominican Republic, posing as an alcoholic rogue agent on the run from U.S. authorities. Burke says that if Michael can clean himself up, he has some use for him. The deeper Michael gets into Burke's assignments, however, the more he realizes that Strong is wrong about him. It becomes clear that Burke is not leading a criminal organization, but is in fact working for someone or some organization much more powerful. Michael realizes just how committed Burke is to that entity, when he sees him sacrifice himself in an explosion to ensure that Michael frees Sonya—the woman that Burke calls "the key to everything."

=== Sonya Lebedenko ===
Sonya Lebedenko
- First appearance: "Brothers in Arms" (7.4)
- Last appearance: "Reckoning" (7.13)
- Portrayed by: Alona Tal

In-universe information
- Gender: female
- Occupation: Former Russian agent/international criminal

Sonya Lebedenko (Alona Tal) is the woman whom Burke calls "the future -- the key to everything." She is a former Russian agent initially revealed to be imprisoned at the behest of her superiors. Burke sacrifices himself to ensure that Michael can free Sonya from her captors. Once freed, Sonya has several assignments for Michael, some of which involve over-the-top and criminal methods, but Michael performs all of them at Agent Strong's prodding. He eventually sleeps with Sonya, even revealing this to Fiona to ensure that she realizes it was necessary for his cover. Sonya then introduces Michael to her boss, James Kendrick, but tricks him by not revealing the methods James uses to ensure his operatives will be loyal. As part of James' organization, Michael continues to work with Sonya, until he reaches a breaking point where he must decide whether the CIA or James' group is the lesser of two evils. Sonya ultimately makes this choice for a tormented Michael by pulling a gun on Fiona, and stating that "she is a threat." But Michael quickly pulls his gun, shooting and killing Sonya.

=== James Kendrick ===
James Kendrick
- First appearance: "Psychological Warfare" (7.7)
- Last appearance: "Reckoning" (7.13)
- Portrayed by: John Pyper-Ferguson

In-universe information
- Gender: male
- Occupation: International criminal syndicate leader

After Michael convinces Sonya that he should meet her boss, she tases him and brings him to James' compound. She does not tell Michael the methods James (John Pyper-Ferguson) uses to ensure his operatives will be loyal. After James uses sensory torture and hallucinogenic drugs to find out all he can about Michael's past and present loyalties, he and Sonya become convinced that Michael will make a great team member. Little is known about James until Jesse is sent to investigate a former Delta Force soldier whose stay at a mental institution is being funded by James. The soldier reveals that James' last name is Kendrick, and that he once wiped out his own Delta Force unit because they were going to continue carrying out a mission in Africa even after discovering that innocent women and children would be harmed. Thus, Michael learns that James and his operatives will do anything to ensure that evil does not prevail in the world. As James eventually tells Michael, "The CIA has to question threats; I eliminate them." Working with Sonya, Michael carries out a number of missions, including the one that Burke was working in the Dominican Republic before he sacrificed himself.

Though many of the methods used in the missions torment Michael, he carries each out, often at Agent Strong's prodding. Eventually, Michael and the CIA have their opportunity to capture or kill James and Sonya, but when Michael finds Simon Escher heading up a capture team and that Simon has been working off-the-books missions for Strong over the past two years, his idyllic vision of the CIA comes crumbling down. Michael helps James and Sonya escape, and after James blames Sonya for leaking their location and points a gun at her head, Michael finally blows his cover. Despite his infuriation, James realizes Michael could have completed his mission and freed his friends but didn't, and he spares him after Michael convinces him that he no longer believes in what the CIA is doing. James then realizes that, with what the CIA now knows, he will continue to be hunted. He arranges his own "capture" at the hands of Michael, with the understanding that Michael and Sonya will head up his organization while Michael continues the façade of working for the CIA. Michael agrees, and even believes that such an arrangement would work; he could do good things without the restraints of CIA rules and leadership. But when Michael sees that Sonya is willing to kill Fiona for being a "threat", he finally realizes that the organization doesn't just operate without rules, it operates without a conscience. Though Michael is on the run from both James and the CIA, he chooses to take out James' organization. Michael, Fiona and Sam raid James' satellite uplink facility to collect a hard drive containing information on James' organization but he sends his forces to Maddie's house and threatens Michael he will harm her if any threat comes to his operation. Maddie sacrifices herself to protect Michael, his friends and Charlie. Ultimately Michael tracks down James and fatally shoots him, but before dying he pushes a dead man's switch that blows up the whole building. Sam escapes with the hard drive while Mike and Fiona fake their deaths. Sam and Jesse later deliver the hard drive to Strong which leads to the capture of over 100 members of James' organization and dismantling of the entire syndicate.

== Recurring characters ==
=== Harris and Lane ===
Agent Harris
- First appearance: "Pilot" (1.01)
- Portrayed by: Marc Macaulay

In-universe information
- Gender: Male
- Occupation: FBI agent

Agent Lane
- First appearance: "Pilot" (1.01)
- Portrayed by: Brandon Morris

In-universe information
- Gender: Male
- Occupation: FBI agent

Agents Harris (Marc Macaulay) and Lane (Brandon Morris) are initially assigned to track Michael Westen through Sam Axe and, if possible, keep him in line. They control him by tying up his pension, thus strong-arming Sam into providing intel on Michael, his movements, and his activities. Constantly thwarted by Michael, they eventually turn up the pressure on Sam, but Michael rescues Sam by providing him the location of a rogue Czech hitman, in Miami to kill Michael. This, along with Sam turning over some high-level documents Michael acquired, not only clears Sam, but ends their assignment of watching Michael.

Later, Michael and his crew develop an almost friendly relationship with Agents Harris and Lane. In multiple instances through seasons two to five, the FBI agents work with Michael, usually to achieve noble ends both sides want, despite the two both vocalizing their wishes that they could arrest Michael.

Both agents appear to be present during Michael and Maddie's funeral in the series finale (front row, far right).

=== Barry Burkowski ===
Barry Burkowski
- First appearance: "Pilot" (1.01)
- Last appearance: "Reckoning" (7.13)
- Portrayed by: Paul Tei

In-universe information
- Gender: Male
- Occupation: Money launderer

Barry (Paul Tei) is a metrosexual and very successful money launderer who is often used by Michael as a source of information about, and introductions to, members of the Miami underworld. Michael also sometimes pays Barry to use his skills at doctoring financial records to help him create cover IDs and to frame his enemies for misconduct, gaining him the nickname "Bad Checks Barry". Barry is fully aware of Michael's burn notice, but could not care less as it is his business to deal with shady characters, but he has dodged Michael on occasions when he felt his life was in danger. Barry is generally rather reluctant to deal with Michael as Michael's requests usually end up being high-risk for him. As an example, Barry had once helped launder money for Greyson Miller (Fiona's old arms dealer). After Fiona was forced to give up Greyson to the CIA, Greyson's people began a cleanup effort in the sixth season that included gunning for Barry and Barry had to be saved by Sam. Later, Barry is approached by Maddie to help Michael and the team escape the country, which he reluctantly agrees to. However, CIA agent Riley discovers Barry's involvement and arrests him. In the final season, it is revealed that Barry was sent to prison and that his business was destroyed in the process. While he was pardoned within four months of his sentence due to Michael's deal with the CIA, he is angry with the team. When approached by Sam and Jesse to help infiltrate a hacking syndicate, he refuses at first but then agrees after they promise to find the money that the syndicate stole from him and also locate his girlfriend who had left him during his sentence. Barry learns that his girlfriend has moved on, breaking his heart, but he does get back the money that was stolen from him. His past grudge against the team disappears, and he plans to use the money to get his business back up and running again. In the series finale, Barry is shown grieving at Michael's "funeral".

=== Sugar ===
Raymond "Sugar"
- First appearance: "Pilot" (1.01)
- Portrayed by: Arturo Rossi (credited as Arturo Fernandez)

In-universe information
- Alias: Sugar
- Gender: Male
- Occupation: Drug dealer
- Relatives: Dougie (cousin)

Sugar (Arturo Rossi) is a drug dealer who used to live next to Michael's loft. First seen in the first season's "Pilot", he threatened Michael to leave but Michael eventually ran Sugar out of the area. In the third-season episode "Noble Causes", Sugar became the client, hiring Michael to help his handicapped cousin who had gotten accidentally mixed up with some bad people. In the fourth-season episode "Neighborhood Watch", Sugar appeared again as a resource for information. In the fifth-season episode "Bloodlines", Sugar supplies Michael with morphine for an injured human trafficker he is attempting to coax information from. During the sixth season, Sugar is interrogated by CIA agent Riley when she uses extreme rules against him in order to find Michael and the team.

Though hostile towards Michael during their first encounter, Sugar eventually gains a large amount of respect for Michael that borders on hero worship.

=== Nate Westen ===
Nate Westen
- First appearance: "Old Friends" (1.04)
- Last appearance: "Reunion" (6.07)
- Portrayed by: Seth Peterson

In-universe information
- Gender: Male
- Occupation: Entrepreneur
- Spouse: Ruth Westen
- Children: Charlie Westen (Son)
- Relatives: Madeline Westen (Mother); Michael Westen (Brother); Frank Westen (Father, Deceased)

Nathaniel "Nate" Elias Westen (Seth Peterson) was Michael's younger brother. When introduced, he is a degenerate gambler and sometimes con man. During the first season, Nate learns that Michael has returned, and attempts to exploit his skills to make enough money to pay off his gambling debts. In the season finale, however, he risks his life to help Michael save Fiona and Sam from drug smugglers.

During the second season, he proclaims that he has given up gambling and is trying to put his life back together, but his recovery is threatened when he is arrested as part of Carla's plan to pressure Michael. During this incident, his mother revealed to Michael that Nate idolized him as a child and feels that Michael does not like him and thought he is better than Nate. After being released, Nate leaves for Las Vegas.

In the third season, Nate returns to announce that he has started a limousine company, and is lining up investors. His plans fall apart, however, when it is revealed that his chief investor is Tyler Brennen, an old foe of Michael's, who kidnaps him to gain leverage over his brother. He married a blackjack dealer, Ruth (Kylee Cochran, Seth Peterson's real-life wife) after only being with her for a month, and had a son named Charlie with her. Early in the sixth season, Ruth left with Charlie, leaving Nate alone and heartbroken despite all his efforts to clean up his act.

When he is around, Michael often calls on Nate to aid the mission in various capacities. He is usually tasked with protecting Madeline, especially when Michael believes the people chasing him may come after her as well. Nate is also used as an "extra body", acting as a bodyguard, driver, or whatever simple role Michael needs to be filled. His final mission was to keep eyes on Anson, but Nate took it upon himself to apprehend him. As Nate was walking Anson out to the authorities, an unknown sniper (later revealed to be Tyler Gray hired by Tom Card) shot Anson with a .50 caliber sniper rifle killing him. The bullet passed through Anson also killing Nate. His last words were "I'm scared" to Michael. At his funeral, Sam, Fiona, and Jesse look on as Michael and Madeline each say goodbye to Nate by kissing him on the forehead. Michael also whispers something to Nate. In the last scene of the funeral, Michael, Madeline, Sam, Fiona, and Jesse are all collectively looking at Nate with vengeance in their eyes for whoever murdered him.

In the seventh season, it's revealed Nate's widow, Ruth, has gone to rehab (presumably over Nate's death), and Madeline has since been fighting for custody of Charlie (played by Wilson Pennell). She doesn't want her grandson to lose all his family, and she wants to honor Nate's sacrifice for his family.

=== Veronica ===
Veronica
- First appearance: "Family Business" (1.05)
- Last appearance: "Scatter Point" (2.05)
- Portrayed by: Audrey Landers

In-universe information
- Gender: Female

Veronica (Audrey Landers) appears repeatedly in the first season as Sam's latest "sugar momma". A very wealthy woman, she provides Sam with a luxurious apartment and a Cadillac sedan (which Michael promptly decimates during a car chase). However, in the second season, she breaks up with Sam, kicks him out of the apartment, and takes back the Cadillac, after proposing to Sam and learning that he is, in fact, already married, albeit to a woman he has not seen in decades.

=== Virgil Watkins ===
Virgil Watkins
- First appearance: "Unpaid Debts" (1.06)
- Last appearance: "Rough Seas" (2.07)
- Portrayed by: Chris Ellis

In-universe information
- Gender: Male
- Occupation: Boat repossessor

A former U.S. Navy SEAL and veteran of the Vietnam War, Virgil (Chris Ellis) was Sam Axe's mentor, and is now retired and running his own business repossessing boats. He first appears in the episode "Unpaid Debts", hiring Sam and Michael to help him out with the repossession of a valuable motorboat. This turns out to be more dangerous than at first suspected, as it is revealed that the boat's owner (Laurence Mason) is a ruthless smuggler using the boat to transport several million dollars in drug money marked for laundering, while Virgil's client (Antoni Corone) is a dirty cop who planned to use Virgil to steal the money, then kill him to cover his tracks. During the course of the episode, Virgil develops a romantic relationship with Madeline Westen, although this is cut short by Michael's insistence that Virgil leave town to avoid being killed. In the second-season episode "Rough Seas", however, he returns to recruit Michael to help the daughter of an old friend foil a band of modern-day pirates, who have stolen a shipment of pharmaceuticals earmarked for humanitarian aid.

=== Victor Stecker-Epps ===
Victor Stecker-Epps
- First appearance: "Bad Blood" (2.06)
- Last appearance: "Lesser Evil" (2.16)
- Portrayed by: Michael Shanks

In-universe information
- Gender: Male
- Occupation: Wrangler
- Spouse: unnamed wife (deceased)
- Children: unnamed son (deceased)

Victor (Michael Shanks) was an employee of Carla's, a flippant, misanthropic, and more than vaguely psychopathic operative who styles himself as a "wrangler", sent in to force unruly recruits (like Michael) to do Carla's bidding. In the second half of season two, however, it is revealed that he has gone rogue, and that it is he who killed Carla's assassin and nearly killed Michael, in order to foil Carla's operation. Captured by Michael, he explains that, when Carla recruited him from the CIA, she killed his wife and four-year-old son, pinning it on a Mexican drug cartel. When he discovered the truth, he resolved to destroy her. Deciding to work together, the two formulate a plan to lure Carla's superiors to a meeting, then supply them with evidence of Carla's misappropriation of her organization's resources, in the hope that she will be killed. However, Carla discovers their plan and attacks the houseboat where Victor keeps the contact information for Management, critically wounding him. As the superiors arrive for the meeting, Carla is killed by Fiona who uses a sniper rifle to shoot Carla fatally in the chest, and Victor makes Michael aware that the wound is fatal, and forces Michael to kill him, saying that it will boost Michael's credibility to Management. Victor then warns Michael to get out of the spy business while he still can. Seconds later, Michael shoots Victor, resulting in Victor dying while Michael is left visibly distressed by what he's done.

=== Seymour ===
Seymour
- First appearance: "Rough Seas" (2.07)
- Last appearance: "Seek and Destroy" (2.12)
- Portrayed by: Silas Weir Mitchell

In-universe information
- Gender: Male
- Occupation: Arms dealer

Seymour (Silas Weir Mitchell) is an erratic, eccentric, and clinically paranoid gunrunner who has an obsession with health food, particularly smoothies. His closest companion is his bodyguard, whom he has nicknamed "Jackass" (Brett Taylor) for his incompetence. When Michael needs help finding out the recipient of a high-powered sniper rifle he was forced to steal for Carla, and later in learning the identity of the bomber who tried to kill him, Fiona suggests that he ask Seymour for help, as she has worked with him several times in the past. Although Seymour is able to help Michael in both cases, he also causes a great deal of trouble as he develops a "man-crush" on Michael and repeatedly draws him into his deals, which invariably go bad.

=== Management ===
Management
- First appearance: "Lesser Evil" (2.16)
- Last appearance: "Devil You Know" (3.16)
- Portrayed by: John Mahoney

In-universe information
- Gender: Male
- Occupation: Criminal syndicate

Management is a professional black ops syndicate that works independently of any known government. They utilize burned spies, mercenaries, assassins, and independent contractors within their group. Because of Michael Westen's reputation, Management engineered a "burn notice" to put the talented and creative spy in a vulnerable enough position to recruit him. After he was disavowed by the United States, they watched Michael for months before sending in the assassin's wrangler "Carla" to recruit and use him. But they did not realize how stubborn and determined Michael was until he began sabotaging their operations. At the same time, Victor Stecker-Epps vengefully began a string of elaborate assassinations of Management's employees that made it clear Carla had lost control of Miami.

Though it was alluded to be a large cartel with many members, the second season's finale "Lesser Evil" shows a humorless old man (John Mahoney) as the group's presumed leader called "Management" himself arriving in a chopper following a shoot-out at the docks. He flew Michael over the ocean and explained to him that they had been protecting him from his enemies and the police after offering him the chance to take over Carla's role after the deaths of Carla and Victor. When Michael refused their offer, Management opened the hatch of the chopper even though they were at least 30 feet in the air. To defy them, Michael leaped from the chopper and landed in the middle of the ocean. As Michael began swimming back toward Miami, the chopper left the city.

In the third season's finale "Devil You Know", it was revealed that Management employed Simon Escher and used the terrorist's crimes to fabricate Michael's burn notice. Michael broke his promise to never again associate with Management by calling the old man on a secure phone to warn him of Simon's escape and murderous plans. After both agreed they needed to work together to stop him, Management arrived at a helipad above Miami where Michael awaited him. However, Simon wired the helipad to explode, killing most of Management's bodyguards. Simon quickly captured Management, taking him at gunpoint in a van, and fled the area. Michael stole a truck and pursued them throughout the city, ultimately driving the truck into the side of the van, which took the vehicle out of commission. As Michael contemplated killing Simon, he was warned by Management that murdering an unarmed man would "ruin [his] big future". He left the scene before FBI agents arrived to arrest both Michael and Simon.

By the fifth season, Management's entire network had been terminated, due to the events of the season finale in the fourth season. In the mid-season finale "Dead to Rights", Anson Fullerton revealed that he and Management had together created the organization that burned Michael. Management's fate is left unknown, although he may have been killed or imprisoned.

=== Agent Diego Garza ===
Diego Garza
- First appearance: "Signals and Codes" (3.05)
- Last appearance: "Long Way Back" (3.09)
- Portrayed by: Otto Sanchez

In-universe information
- Gender: Male
- Occupation: Spy

Diego Garza (Otto Sanchez) was a spy who was moved to an undercover job loading crates in an airport, an occupation he is happy with. Michael meets with Garza to attempt to get back into his old job, and Garza agrees to try to help him, albeit reluctantly. Garza is impressed with Michael's apparent success in returning to his job but unaware that he was working with Strickler. When Garza learns this after Strickler's death, he is horrified, revealing that the two of them are now being tracked by Strickler's cleaners, and tries to set up a meeting with Michael. However, the cleaners get to Garza before the meeting can occur and Garza "falls" from his apartment building to his death, with Michael finding his dead body. Although Garza's death was ruled a suicide by investigating federal authorities, Michael learns Gilroy arranged for Garza's murder for getting too close to his business.

=== Bill Cowley ===
Congressman Bill Cowley
- First appearance: "Past and Future Tense" (4.7)
- Last appearance: "Last Stand" (4.18)
- Portrayed by: John Doman

In-universe information
- Gender: Male
- Occupation: United States Congressman

Congressman Bill Cowley is a slick Miami congressman with ambitions of higher office during a gathering of intelligence officials in the state. An old associate of his, Paul Anderson (Burt Reynolds), had accidentally revealed sensitive information that reignited a hit contract on his life from Russian military operatives and proved his fake death false. But Paul had a long-forgotten ledger signed by Cowley back in 1986, which illegally deployed U.S. soldiers into Bogota, Colombia in what was ultimately a blood-bath and failure.

After a failed attempt to talk to Cowley by Sam Axe, they bring in the more empathetic Madeline to gain access to him. As she already dislikes him as a politician, she takes pleasure in threatening to expose the Bogota ledger and effectively destroy his career. Cowley, however, blows her off and tries to leave, when Madeline threatens to scream this to his constituents. Both Sam and Madeline break him from his entourage and Cowley is returned to his home, where Michael and Paul are awaiting his arrival.

Paul explains that he needs to be placed in Witness Protection (WITSEC) to keep his Russian enemies from killing him. Cowley scoffs that the Bogota ledger is useless, as he framed a two-star General for the botched mission years ago. He threatens yearly tax audits for Sam and Madeline for kidnapping him, and promises suffering for Michael and Paul as well. An infuriated Paul then breaks free of Michael's grasp and beats Cowley unconscious on his own floor. The Russian black ops team then mounts a raid on the house, forcing Michael and Sam to board up the windows and quickly formulate a plan. As one of the commandos breaks in, they subdue him and slip outside; reversing the situation, and holding the black ops team hostage inside. All four of them surrender, including their leader—Vitali. As Vitali and his men are being subdued, he makes a last-ditch effort to avenge his homeland, and pulls a gun on both Paul and Michael. Paul takes out his pistol and kills Vitali in self-defense. Michael then makes Cowley an offer: he can either have Paul placed in the Witness Protection Program and take the great press of having taken down a black ops team single-handedly, or explain to the authorities why he is associating with two burned spies. Cowley agrees, and Paul is relocated.

Cowley returns in the fourth-season finale "Last Stand", where he is again approached by Madeline at a speaking engagement. This time he is slightly less-reserved about speaking with them. Sam tries to explain the existence of "Management" to him and the fact that they have members high-up in the government infrastructure. When Sam mentions this involves John Barrett and his company, Cowley becomes more interested, as he headed the sub-committee hearing concerning the Drake Technologies conspiracy. Again untrusting, he calls an ally in the F.B.I. and is quickly ordered to surrender himself to Protective Custody by the crooked Director. However, Cowley is eventually convinced of Sam's truthfulness and has Marines deployed to the structure where Michael, Jesse, Fiona and a kidnapped Madeline are being held. This ends in the capture of "Vaughn" and the N.O.C. List containing the identities of all members of "Management".

=== Marv ===
Marvin Peterson
- First appearance: "Past and Future Tense" (4.07)
- Last appearance: "Dead or Alive" (4.16)
- Portrayed by: Richard Kind

In-universe information
- Gender: Male
- Occupation: Handler

Marvin "Marv" Peterson was a member of the U.S. Defense Department and the handler for counter-intelligence operative Jesse Porter. In the aftermath of Jesse's mysterious firing, he tried to prove Jesse's innocence but was to keep his mouth shut. He is reunited with Jesse during the International Intelligence Conference at the Eden Rock Hotel in Miami. Marv was given information about Simon Escher's Holy Bible, which contained the names, aliases, and locations of "Management", an international criminal syndicate. This information eventually led to the take-down of Drake Technologies and its C.E.O., John Barrett.

In "Hot Property", Marv was again lured to Miami by Sam Axe, posing as a private investigator who would expose to his wife a love affair he had a decade earlier. Of course, this was a ploy by Jesse to talk with his old handler. Jesse wanted $5 million in cash (that was to be destroyed by the Treasury anyway) to buy his way into an auction for the Holy Bible, which had been lost and then stolen by a surviving Drake Technologies bodyguard, Justin Walsh. Once he was warned of the stakes, Marv agreed and arranged for the money to be delivered. But it came with a condition: he wanted to have a meeting with Michael Westen to establish some trust and make sure he was not financing a murderous criminal, as Michael's dossier makes him out to be. Marv convinced Michael to undergo a polygraph test and check out his entire story. It did, and he agreed to have the N.O.C. List taken out of Miami once they obtained it.

In "Dead Or Alive", Marv returns and promises the arrival of Homeland Security officials to have the data chip taken into custody. He arranges for the meeting to take place on the roof of a parking structure, but after handing off the list, Michael deduces that Homeland Security agents would not have silencers on their pistols. He calls out for Marv to return the chip. As the situation becomes chaotic, Marv cries out that he had to "give it to them" or they'd kill his wife. Marv is shot to death from behind by the fake Homeland Security agents and collapses on the ground. As the fake agents depart, Michael sees a grinning Tyler Brennen sitting in the back seat of one of their SUVs.

=== Adam Scott ===
Adam Scott
- First appearance: "Guilty as Charged" (4.12)
- Last appearance: "Eyes Open" (4.13)
- Portrayed by: Danny Pino

In-universe information
- Gender: Male
- Occupation: Attorney

Scott (Danny Pino) was a high-profile and very wealthy criminal defense lawyer. His numerous victories in court earned him a slew of dangerous allies, who owed him favors for helping them get away with various crimes. His knowledge of the law, and his success has left him arrogant and self-perceived to be untouchable, as long as he maintains his right to silence and the Fifth Amendment; as such the only morals he follows are those upholdable in a court of law. When a murderous gang-lord, Dale Lawson, kidnaps his daughter and demands Scott defend and acquit his brother or else they'll murder his kid; Scott turns to Michael for assistance in returning her because of his reputation. Although he offers Michael an unlimited amount of money/favors, the only thing that Michael ends up taking from Scott in return is a submersible vehicle he intends on using to capture John Barrett. Once Michael returns his daughter to him, Scott swears vengeance upon Dale Lawson and his entire crew.

Shortly after awaking from a coma, Michael learns of a massive bombing in a crowded restaurant that kills numerous people; among them, Dale Lawson and some of his men. Michael and Fiona confront him and Scott implies he has used one of his many criminal allies to follow through with his promise of killing Lawson and his whole group. He hired a psychotic mad bomber/vigilante, Dennis Wayne Barfield, to carry out the assassinations in retaliation for his daughter's kidnapping. Eventually he is convinced by Michael to call off Barfield, though he underestimates the madness of his hired gunman and is shot and killed by Barfield in his home later that day.

=== Max ===
Max
- First appearance: "Company Man" (5.01)
- Last appearance: "No Good Deed" (5.04)
- Portrayed by: Grant Show

In-universe information
- Gender: Male
- Occupation: CIA operative

Max is a CIA operative assigned as Michael's partner in hunting down all the people on the NOC list after the events of season 4. Once they are seemingly finished with their work, they are doing small-scale field operations while Michael is in the process of being reinstated with the CIA. Max, just like the others, does not share Michael's paranoia regarding certain inconsistencies in the documents on the organization they just destroyed. However, at the end of the episode "No Good Deed", things take a sudden twist as Max is shot to death by an unseen assassin, and Michael is framed for his murder.

=== Dani Pearce ===
Dani Pearce
- First appearance: "Square One" (5.05)
- Last appearance: "Unchained" (6.08)
- Portrayed by: Lauren Stamile

In-universe information
- Gender: Female
- Occupation: CIA operative, "bloodhound" investigator
- Spouse: Jay (deceased for 7–8 years)

After Max's death, Agent Pearce (Lauren Stamile) is assigned to investigate his death as well as be Michael Westen's new point of contact for the CIA. Michael uncovers a slew of evidence that frames him in Max's murder and stalls Pearce's investigative hunches and questions. Pearce trusts Michael until she finally gets the documents he was "looking through" where she arrests him. Michael convinces Pearce to trust him one last time to find Max's real killer, which she reluctantly agrees to.

With Michael exonerated, Pearce and Michael begin to rebuild their professional relationship, where she acts as his point of contact to the Agency when they require some external assistance. When Michael applies to talk to Vaughn, Pearce demands to know why he continues digging, hoping that she can help, to which Michael outlines Anson's actions thus far, imploring her—for her safety—to not get involved.

In the season finale, Pearce follows Michael as he leads an official CIA team on an operation, one Anson wishes to have compromised and the team burned, to make them his recruits in the rebuilt organization. While Michael scrambles to juggle both Anson and Fiona, Fiona slips out and surrenders, allowing Michael and Jesse to take the full force of the CIA against Anson. While Anson escapes, his actions lead to his complete blacklisting by the CIA and other government agencies. Pearce tells Michael that catching Anson will help greatly in exonerating Fiona.

In "Last Rites", Anson attempts to leverage Pearce to his side by giving her information on her fiancé's killer, who is now a CIA asset. With help from Michael's team and family, Pearce successfully removes the killer's protection as an asset and brings him to justice.

After the failed mission in "Shockwave", she willingly decides to sacrifice her career and help Michael in Nate's murder investigation, feeling she owes him and the team for helping her get her fiancé's killer arrested. When the investigation causes her to circumvent CIA procedures (again willingly), it results in her being transferred from Miami to Mumbai, a punishment posting. Her parting words to Michael: "Just promise me this won't be for nothing."

=== Tyler Gray ===
Tyler Gray
- First appearance: "Desperate Times" (6.10)
- Last appearance: "Means & Ends" (6.12)
- Portrayed by: Kenny Johnson

In-universe information
- Gender: Male
- Occupation: Sniper/Spy/U.S. Marine

Tyler Gray is the man that was hired to kill Anson and who (unwittingly) killed Nate. After Michael captured him, he tells Michael that Card set him up. Gray was also in the Marines as a sniper. After avoiding the F-18 strike ordered by Card, Michael tries to bring Gray back with him by hijacking a plane back to the US. However, Gray attacked Michael and rolled off the plane onto the runway, into the arms of South American drug smugglers who owned the plane, and Michael followed him out. Both are captured by the drug lord and interrogated with a cattle-prod until Gray watches Michael, facing certain death, still refusing to give up the location of his team. Gray realizes Michael has a sense of honor and respect, and he isn't the man described in the dossier provided by Card. Gray kills the drug lord and breaks the neck of his bodyguard. Both escape out the front in a massive gunfight to board the cargo plane and escape the country, with some help from Michael's team. Michael tells Gray he blames Card more than him for the death of Nate, and asks that he help bring Card down.

After they return to the United States, Gray agrees to help the team get to Card and meets him several times wearing a wire to record their conversations as evidence. He claims to Card that Michael and his friends were killed, and tries to squeeze information out of Card that would prove his involvement. Gray even makes an apology to Madeline for accidentally killing her son, and forewarns Michael and Fiona that Card has ordered him to torch their loft to destroy evidence after removing anything related to Anson Fullerton. A few days later during a meeting in Card's office, Michael and team realize that Card is blocking out any kind of outside feed which makes getting the signal from Gray's wire impossible. They assume Card knows, or at least suspects, Gray is setting him up. Michael enters the building and storms into Card's office with gun in hand to finally confront Card. After explaining to Michael his motivations for killing Anson (he knew about Anson's illegal activities going on in foreign countries and had, in fact, sanctioned them), Card tells Michael, "you forced my hand," and he shoots and kills Gray. Moments later, Michael shockingly avenges the murder of his brother's assassin by shooting a bullet square through Card's forehead, killing him instantly.

=== Calvin Schmidt ===
Calvin Schmidt
- First appearance: "Down and Out" (6.14)
- Last appearance: "Odd Man Out" (6.16)
- Portrayed by: Patton Oswalt

In-universe information
- Gender: male
- Occupation: Smuggler

Calvin Schmidt is a smuggler to whom Michael is led while trying to escape Agent Olivia Riley. Schmidt is recommended as the best person available to get passports with foolproof aliases made for Michael and his team, but Schmidt's services come at a dangerous and expensive price.

Michael must first allow himself to be captured by a Syrian agent to get one of Schmidt's main enemies off his back. Next, Schmidt gets Michael and the team involved in selling a black market alarm disarming device and aiding in a break-in in order to raise the significant fees for the passports. Finally, while trying to secure the final element of the passports, the microchip implants, Michael opens up himself and Schmidt to attack by a rival smuggler with a grudge against Schmidt. While the team finally does get the passports, it is for naught as their escape plans are ultimately thwarted by Riley and her CIA team.

=== Agent Andrew Strong ===
Andrew Strong
- First appearance: "New Deal" (7.1)
- Last appearance: "Reckoning" (7.13)
- Portrayed by: Jack Coleman

In-universe information
- Gender: male
- Occupation: CIA Agent

Andrew Strong is the CIA agent who arranges the release of Michael, Maddie and Michael's friends after they had been detained following the events of the season six finale. Strong gives Michael a mission: one that, if it succeeds, will secure freedom for all of them for good, but will send them all back to prison if it fails. The mission is to take down the operation headed by a man named Randall Burke, whom Strong calls an international terrorist. Burke's operation has consumed Strong for the last eight years, and though he knows some of Burke's deeds, Strong says he's never been able to get anyone close enough to take Burke down. Michael goes deep undercover to get hired by Burke, but soon finds out that Burke is really more of an operative, and is working for someone much more powerful. Strong reluctantly allows Michael to bring back Sam and Jesse for assistance on his mission, then Strong himself blackmails Fiona into helping. When Michael reveals to Strong that Burke has bosses, and Burke later dies, Strong insists that Michael's mission is not over and that he must now take down Burke's leaders. Strong sanctions a number of questionable moves after Michael gets deep into James' organization—including the assassination of a go-between that Michael once worked with and considered to be a friend. (Strong convinces Michael that the go-between had caused more "good guys" to be killed than Michael would ever know about.) After Michael frees James and Sonya and is thought to be dead, he contacts Strong and convinces him that his cover is still intact. Then Strong and Michael convince the CIA Director to give them 48 more hours to capture James. But the capture goes bad when Michael kills Sonya, resulting in James fleeing by helicopter, and Strong alerts authorities that Michael, Sam, Jesse and Fiona are now wanted criminals. However, after Michael and Fiona "die" in the explosion of James' satellite uplink facility, and information leads to the capture of over 100 of James' operatives, Strong finds a way to keep Sam and Jesse out of prison. He also arranges for Michael to get a star on the CIA Memorial Wall.
