= List of Burn Notice episodes =

Burn Notice is an American television series that originally aired on the cable television channel USA Network from June 28, 2007 to September 12, 2013. The show follows the life of protagonist Michael Westen (Jeffrey Donovan), a covert operative who has been "burned" (identified as an unreliable or dangerous agent) and tries to find out why. With his assets frozen, he is unable to leave Miami and forced to live off any small investigative jobs he can find, with the help of his trigger-happy, ex-girlfriend Fiona Glenanne (Gabrielle Anwar), and his old military friend Sam Axe (Bruce Campbell), who briefly informed on him to the FBI. His return to Miami also reunites him with his mother Madeline Westen (Sharon Gless), who becomes an increasingly important part of Michael's life even as he tries to hide his activities from her. Underpinning the episodic stories of Michael's investigative jobs is the running subplot exploring Michael's efforts to find out who burned him, and to get his job and reputation back.

As creator of the show, Matt Nix serves as executive producer and often writes episodes for the show. He made his directorial debut with the season two episode "Do No Harm", which he had also written. Seven seasons have completed airing in the United States, with 12 episodes in the first season, 16 episodes in the second and third seasons, and 18 episodes in the fourth season. The fourth season introduced new regular character Jesse Porter (Coby Bell), a counterintelligence agent whom Michael unintentionally burns, but later makes part of his team. In October 2009, USA Networks announced the renewal of the series for seasons 5 and 6. The show's fifth season, comprising 18 episodes, began airing June 23, 2011, and entered a mid-season break after twelve episodes on September 8, 2011. The remaining episodes aired in November and December 2011, for a finale on December 15, 2011. The program concluded its 18-episode sixth season, which premiered on June 14, 2012, and ended on December 20, 2012, with a two-hour finale. On November 7, 2012, USA Networks renewed Burn Notice for a seventh season, and, on May 10, 2013, announced that it would be the series' final season. The seventh season premiered on June 6, 2013, and the series reached its 100th episode with "Forget Me Not", the second episode of that season. The series finale aired on September 12, 2013. A total of 111 episodes of Burn Notice were broadcast over seven seasons.

== Series overview ==
| Season | Episodes | Originally released | |
| Season | Episodes | First released | Last released |
|---|---|---|---|
| 1 | 12 | June 28, 2007 | September 20, 2007 |
| 2 | 16 | July 10, 2008 | March 5, 2009 |
| 3 | 16 | June 4, 2009 | March 4, 2010 |
| 4 | 18 | June 3, 2010 | December 16, 2010 |
| 5 | 18 | June 23, 2011 | December 15, 2011 |
| 6 | 18 | June 14, 2012 | December 20, 2012 |
| 7 | 13 | June 6, 2013 | September 12, 2013 |
| Television film | | April 17, 2011 | |

== Episodes ==
=== Season 1 (2007) ===
| No. overall | No. in season | Title | Directed by | Written by | Original release date | Prod. code | US viewers (millions) |
|---|---|---|---|---|---|---|---|
| 1 | 1 | "Pilot"^{Note 1} | Jace Alexander | Matt Nix | June 28, 2007 | BN179 | 3.99 |
| 2 | 2 | "Identity" | Rod Hardy | Matt Nix | July 5, 2007 | BN101 | 3.94 |
| 3 | 3 | "Fight or Flight"^{Note 2} | Colin Bucksey | Craig O'Neill & Jason Tracey | July 12, 2007 | BN103 | 3.25 |
| 4 | 4 | "Old Friends"^{Note 2} | David Solomon | Alfredo Barrios, Jr. | July 19, 2007 | BN102 | 3.33 |
| 5 | 5 | "Family Business" | Sanford Bookstaver | Matt Nix | July 26, 2007 | BN104 | 3.51 |
| 6 | 6 | "Unpaid Debts" | Paul Holahan | Nick Thiel | August 2, 2007 | BN105 | 4.41 |
| 7 | 7 | "Broken Rules" | Tim Matheson | Mere Smith | August 9, 2007 | BN106 | 4.14 |
| 8 | 8 | "Wanted Man" | Ken Girotti | Craig O'Neill & Jason Tracey | August 16, 2007 | BN107 | 4.23 |
| 9 | 9 | "Hard Bargain" | John T. Kretchmer | Alfredo Barrios, Jr. | August 23, 2007 | BN108 | 4.08 |
| 10 | 10 | "False Flag" | Paul Shapiro | Matt Nix & Ben Watkins | September 13, 2007 | BN109 | 4.02 |
| 11 | 11 | "Dead Drop"^{Note 3} | Jeremiah S. Chechik | Craig O'Neill & Jason Tracey | September 20, 2007 | BN110 | 4.78 |
| 12 | 12 | "Loose Ends"^{Note 3} | Stephen Surjik | Matt Nix & Alfredo Barrios, Jr. | September 20, 2007 | BN111 | 4.78 |

Notes

1. The pilot was originally produced to be shown as a two-hour movie or as two one-hour episodes. When USA decided to broadcast it uninterrupted, it was edited to fit a 90 minute time slot; this version is also on the Season 1 DVD. The two-part version was eventually shown in Australia, and is now on PlutoTV More Drama channel.
2. "Fight or Flight" was originally intended for broadcast after episode "Old Friends", however these episodes were slightly re-edited and shown in reverse order.
3. "Dead Drop" and "Loose Ends" were shown as one continuous two-hour finale, but originally produced to be aired as two separate episodes. "Dead Drop" is sometimes referred to as "Loose Ends", Part I.
4. Season One was originally broadcast in 1.33:1 (full screen) format. Beginning with the June 5, 2008 rebroadcast of "Wanted Man", the show began airing in 1.78:1 (widescreen) format.

=== Season 2 (2008–09) ===
| No. overall | No. in season | Title | Directed by | Written by | Original release date | Prod. code | US viewers (millions) |
|---|---|---|---|---|---|---|---|
| 13 | 1 | "Breaking and Entering" | Paul Holahan | Matt Nix | July 10, 2008 | BN201 | 5.39 |
| 14 | 2 | "Turn and Burn" | John T. Kretchmer | Alfredo Barrios, Jr. | July 17, 2008 | BN202 | 4.87 |
| 15 | 3 | "Trust Me" | Paul Holahan | Craig O'Neill & Jason Tracey | July 24, 2008 | BN203 | 4.76 |
| 16 | 4 | "Comrades" | John T. Kretchmer | Matt Nix & Jason Ning | July 31, 2008 | BN204 | 4.86 |
| 17 | 5 | "Scatter Point" | Rod Hardy | Ben Watkins | August 7, 2008 | BN205 | 4.56 |
| 18 | 6 | "Bad Blood" | Bronwen Hughes | Matt Nix & Rashad Raisani | August 14, 2008 | BN206 | 3.88 |
| 19 | 7 | "Rough Seas" | Jeremiah S. Chechik | Alfredo Barrios, Jr. & Michael Horowitz | August 21, 2008 | BN207 | 3.86 |
| 20 | 8 | "Double Booked" | Tim Matheson | Craig O'Neill & Jason Tracey | September 11, 2008 | BN208 | 4.77 |
| 21 | 9 | "Good Soldier" | Jeff Freilich | Alfredo Barrios, Jr. | September 18, 2008 | BN209 | 4.67 |
| 22 | 10 | "Do No Harm" | Matt Nix | Matt Nix | January 22, 2009 | BN210 | 5.12 |
| 23 | 11 | "Hot Spot" | Stephen Surjik | Ben Watkins | January 29, 2009 | BN211 | 5.38 |
| 24 | 12 | "Seek and Destroy" | Scott Peters | Rashad Raisani | February 5, 2009 | BN212 | 5.27 |
| 25 | 13 | "Bad Breaks" | John T. Kretchmer | Michael Horowitz | February 12, 2009 | BN213 | 4.84 |
| 26 | 14 | "Truth & Reconciliation" | Ernest Dickerson | Alfredo Barrios, Jr. | February 19, 2009 | BN214 | 4.67 |
| 27 | 15 | "Sins of Omission" | Dennie Gordon | Craig O'Neill & Jason Tracey | February 26, 2009 | BN215 | 4.85 |
| 28 | 16 | "Lesser Evil" | Tim Matheson | Matt Nix | March 5, 2009 | BN216 | 6.09 |

=== Season 3 (2009–10) ===
The third season of Burn Notice premiered on June 4, 2009. Both Nix and Donovan have revealed that the season will focus on the past of Michael, Fiona and Sam. Ben Shenkman ("Tom Strickler"), Moon Bloodgood ("Detective Paxson"), and Otto Sanchez ("Agent Diego Garza") appeared in recurring roles during the summer season. The winter season premiered on January 21, 2010, opening with the reunion of actors Tyne Daly and Sharon Gless nearly 14 years after they last teamed up as Cagney and Lacey. Recurring characters in the winter season include Chris Vance as Mason Gilroy, a spy handler known as a "puppetmaster" with whom Michael must work.

| No. overall | No. in season | Title | Directed by | Written by | Original release date | Prod. code | US viewers (millions) |
|---|---|---|---|---|---|---|---|
| 29 | 1 | "Friends and Family" | Tim Matheson | Matt Nix | June 4, 2009 | BN301 | 5.99 |
| 30 | 2 | "Question and Answer" | John T. Kretchmer | Alfredo Barrios, Jr. | June 11, 2009 | BN302 | 5.24 |
| 31 | 3 | "End Run" | Dennie Gordon | Craig O'Neill | June 18, 2009 | BN303 | 5.78 |
| 32 | 4 | "Fearless Leader" | John T. Kretchmer | Michael Horowitz | June 25, 2009 | BN304 | 5.35 |
| 33 | 5 | "Signals and Codes" | Jeremiah S. Chechik | Jason Tracey | July 9, 2009 | BN305 | 5.51 |
| 34 | 6 | "The Hunter" | Bryan Spicer | Story by : Ryan Johnson; Teleplay by : Lisa Joy | July 16, 2009 | BN306 | 6.66 |
| 35 | 7 | "Shot in the Dark" | Ernest Dickerson | Ben Watkins | July 23, 2009 | BN307 | 6.80 |
| 36 | 8 | "Friends Like These" | Félix Alcalá | Rashad Raisani | July 30, 2009 | BN308 | 6.63 |
| 37 | 9 | "Long Way Back" | Jeff Freilich | Craig O'Neill | August 6, 2009 | BN309 | 7.59 |
| 38 | 10 | "A Dark Road" | John T. Kretchmer | Matt Nix | January 21, 2010 | BN310 | 5.35 |
| 39 | 11 | "Friendly Fire" | Terry Miller | Alfredo Barrios, Jr. | January 28, 2010 | BN311 | 5.30 |
| 40 | 12 | "Noble Causes" | Michael Zinberg | Ben Watkins | February 4, 2010 | BN312 | 4.25 |
| 41 | 13 | "Enemies Closer" | Kevin Bray | Jason Tracey | February 11, 2010 | BN313 | 4.66 |
| 42 | 14 | "Partners in Crime" | Dirk Craft | Michael Horowitz | February 18, 2010 | BN314 | 4.12 |
| 43 | 15 | "Good Intentions" | Dennie Gordon | Rashad Raisani | February 25, 2010 | BN315 | 4.50 |
| 44 | 16 | "Devil You Know" | Matt Nix | Matt Nix | March 4, 2010 | BN316 | 4.32 |

=== Season 4 (2010) ===
Burn Notice was renewed for a fourth season that began airing on June 3, 2010. The season also featured the directorial debut of Jeffrey Donovan who directed the third aired episode of the season "Made Man". Coby Bell joined the cast as Jesse Porter, a counterintelligence expert who can easily assume cover identities and has a burning desire to catch criminals. Robert Wisdom portrayed Vaughn, a spy working for those who burned Michael, in a minimum of six episodes. Burt Reynolds guest-starred as a legend in the spy business whose story serves as a look forward to what Michael's life could become. Additionally, Tim Matheson reprised his role as "Dead" Larry Sizemore and Jay Karnes reprised his role as Tyler Brennen. The fourth season was extended by two episodes to 18. The season was broadcast in two parts, with the first part ending on August 26, and the final six episodes beginning on November 11 and concluding on December 16, 2010.

| No. overall | No. in season | Title | Directed by | Written by | Original release date | Prod. code | US viewers (millions) |
|---|---|---|---|---|---|---|---|
| 45 | 1 | "Friends and Enemies" | Tim Matheson | Matt Nix | June 3, 2010 | BN401 | 6.62 |
| 46 | 2 | "Fast Friends" | Dennie Gordon | Rashad Raisani | June 10, 2010 | BN402 | 5.67 |
| 47 | 3 | "Made Man" | Jeffrey Donovan | Alfredo Barrios, Jr. | June 17, 2010 | BN403 | 5.31 |
| 48 | 4 | "Breach of Faith" | Jeremiah S. Chechik | Ben Watkins | June 24, 2010 | BN404 | 5.33 |
| 49 | 5 | "Neighborhood Watch" | Kevin Bray | Michael Horowitz | July 1, 2010 | BN405 | 5.21 |
| 50 | 6 | "Entry Point" | Jeffrey Hunt | Craig O'Neill | July 15, 2010 | BN406 | 5.65 |
| 51 | 7 | "Past & Future Tense" | Jeremiah S. Chechik | Jason Tracey | July 22, 2010 | BN407 | 5.87 |
| 52 | 8 | "Where There's Smoke" | Kevin Bray | Lisa Joy | July 29, 2010 | BN408 | 5.38 |
| 53 | 9 | "Center of the Storm" | Colin Bucksey | Ryan Johnson & Peter Lalayanis | August 5, 2010 | BN409 | 5.69 |
| 54 | 10 | "Hard Time" | Dennie Gordon | Alfredo Barrios, Jr. | August 12, 2010 | BN410 | 5.57 |
| 55 | 11 | "Blind Spot" | Michael Smith | Michael Horowitz | August 19, 2010 | BN411 | 5.50 |
| 56 | 12 | "Guilty as Charged" | Jeremiah S. Chechik | Matt Nix | August 26, 2010 | BN412 | 6.29 |
| 57 | 13 | "Eyes Open" | Dennie Gordon | Jason Tracey | November 11, 2010 | BN413 | 4.32 |
| 58 | 14 | "Hot Property" | Jonathan Frakes | Rashad Raisani | November 18, 2010 | BN414 | 3.50 |
| 59 | 15 | "Brotherly Love" | Terry Miller | Ben Watkins | December 2, 2010 | BN415 | 3.70 |
| 60 | 16 | "Dead or Alive" | Peter Markle | Lisa Joy | December 9, 2010 | BN416 | 4.34 |
| 61 | 17 | "Out of the Fire" | Marc Roskin | Craig O'Neill | December 16, 2010 | BN417 | 4.77 |
| 62 | 18 | "Last Stand" | Stephen Surjik | Matt Nix | December 16, 2010 | BN418 | 5.11 |

=== Season 5 (2011) ===
Burn Notice was renewed for a fifth season, consisting of 18 episodes, on April 16, 2010. The first half of the fifth season concluded airing after 12 episodes on September 8, 2011, with the remaining six episodes beginning on November 3, 2011. The season concluded in December, 2011.

| No. overall | No. in season | Title | Directed by | Written by | Original release date | Prod. code | US viewers (millions) |
|---|---|---|---|---|---|---|---|
| 63 | 1 | "Company Man" | Stephen Surjik | Matt Nix | June 23, 2011 | BN501 | 5.17 |
| 64 | 2 | "Bloodlines" | Colin Bucksey | Alfredo Barrios, Jr. | June 30, 2011 | BN502 | 4.67 |
| 65 | 3 | "Mind Games" | Scott Peters | Michael Horowitz | July 7, 2011 | BN503 | 4.88 |
| 66 | 4 | "No Good Deed" | Jeremiah S. Chechik | Rashad Raisani & Ben Watkins | July 14, 2011 | BN504 | 5.39 |
| 67 | 5 | "Square One" | Marc Roskin | Ryan Johnson & Peter Lalayanis | July 21, 2011 | BN505 | 5.39 |
| 68 | 6 | "Enemy of My Enemy" | Jonathan Frakes | Jason Tracey | July 28, 2011 | BN506 | 5.00 |
| 69 | 7 | "Besieged" | Stephen Surjik | Craig O'Neill | August 4, 2011 | BN507 | 5.21 |
| 70 | 8 | "Hard Out" | Craig Siebels | Rashad Raisani | August 11, 2011 | BN508 | 4.75 |
| 71 | 9 | "Eye for an Eye" | Jeremiah S. Chechik | Michael Horowitz | August 18, 2011 | BN509 | 5.32 |
| 72 | 10 | "Army of One" | Tawnia McKiernan | Alfredo Barrios, Jr. | August 25, 2011 | BN510 | 4.58 |
| 73 | 11 | "Better Halves" | Michael Smith | Lisa Joy | September 1, 2011 | BN511 | 4.07 |
| 74 | 12 | "Dead to Rights" | Matt Nix | Jason Tracey | September 8, 2011 | BN512 | 4.39 |
| 75 | 13 | "Damned If You Do" | Stephen Surjik | Matt Nix | November 3, 2011 | BN513 | 2.86 |
| 76 | 14 | "Breaking Point" | Renny Harlin | Ben Watkins & Rashad Raisani | November 10, 2011 | BN514 | 2.66 |
| 77 | 15 | "Necessary Evil" | Alfredo Barrios, Jr. | Craig O'Neill | November 17, 2011 | BN515 | 2.36 |
| 78 | 16 | "Depth Perception" | Craig Siebels | Peter Lalayanis & Ryan Johnson | December 1, 2011 | BN516 | 3.12 |
| 79 | 17 | "Acceptable Loss" | Jonathan Frakes | Ben Watkins | December 8, 2011 | BN517 | 2.79 |
| 80 | 18 | "Fail Safe" | Renny Harlin | Matt Nix | December 15, 2011 | BN518 | 2.89 |

=== Season 6 (2012) ===
A sixth season, consisting of 18 episodes, was ordered by USA Network on April 16, 2010. This announcement came just over a month after the third season had completed airing. The season began in summer 2012.

| No. overall | No. in season | Title | Directed by | Written by | Original release date | Prod. code | US viewers (millions) |
|---|---|---|---|---|---|---|---|
| 81 | 1 | "Scorched Earth" | Stephen Surjik | Matt Nix | June 14, 2012 | BN601 | 3.87 |
| 82 | 2 | "Mixed Messages" | Jeffrey Donovan | Alfredo Barrios, Jr. | June 21, 2012 | BN602 | 4.09 |
| 83 | 3 | "Last Rites" | Nick Gomez | Ben Watkins | June 28, 2012 | BN603 | 4.11 |
| 84 | 4 | "Under the Gun" | Dennie Gordon | Michael Horowitz | July 12, 2012 | BN604 | 4.44 |
| 85 | 5 | "Split Decision" | Scott Peters | Ryan Johnson & Peter Lalayanis | July 19, 2012 | BN605 | 4.97 |
| 86 | 6 | "Shock Wave" | Renny Harlin | Jason Tracey | July 26, 2012 | BN606 | 4.86 |
| 87 | 7 | "Reunion" | Craig Siebels | Rashad Raisani | August 2, 2012 | BN607 | 4.32 |
| 88 | 8 | "Unchained" | Alfredo Barrios, Jr. | Alfredo Barrios, Jr. | August 9, 2012 | BN608 | 4.04 |
| 89 | 9 | "Official Business" | Jonathan Frakes | Bridget Tyler | August 16, 2012 | BN609 | 4.36 |
| 90 | 10 | "Desperate Times" | Renny Harlin | Craig O'Neill | August 23, 2012 | BN610 | 4.96 |
| 91 | 11 | "Desperate Measures" | Stephen Surjik | Michael Horowitz | November 8, 2012 | BN611 | 3.47 |
| 92 | 12 | "Means & Ends" | Ron Underwood | Jason Tracey | November 8, 2012 | BN612 | 3.47 |
| 93 | 13 | "Over the Line" | Marc Roskin | Ben Watkins | November 15, 2012 | BN613 | 3.17 |
| 94 | 14 | "Down & Out" | Henry J. Bronchtein | Story by : Daniel Tuch; Teleplay by : Daniel Tuch & Matt Nix | November 29, 2012 | BN614 | 3.14 |
| 95 | 15 | "Best Laid Plans" | Nick Gomez | Rashad Raisani | December 6, 2012 | BN615 | 3.16 |
| 96 | 16 | "Odd Man Out" | Marc Roskin | Ryan Johnson & Peter Lalayanis | December 13, 2012 | BN616 | 2.86 |
| 97 | 17 | "You Can Run..." | Nick Gomez | Craig O'Neill | December 20, 2012 | BN617 | 3.78 |
| 98 | 18 | "Game Change" | Matt Nix | Matt Nix | December 20, 2012 | BN618 | 3.78 |

=== Season 7 (2013) ===
USA renewed Burn Notice for a 13-episode seventh season on November 7, 2012. Production began Monday, March 18, 2013 and episodes began airing on June 6, 2013. USA Network announced May 10, 2013 that the seventh season of Burn Notice would be its last.

| No. overall | No. in season | Title | Directed by | Written by | Original release date | Prod. code | US viewers (millions) |
|---|---|---|---|---|---|---|---|
| 99 | 1 | "New Deal" | Stephen Surjik | Matt Nix | June 6, 2013 | BN701 | 4.32 |
| 100 | 2 | "Forget Me Not" | Jeffrey Donovan | Ben Watkins | June 13, 2013 | BN702 | 4.29 |
| 101 | 3 | "Down Range" | Scott Peters | Craig O'Neill | June 20, 2013 | BN703 | 3.40 |
| 102 | 4 | "Brothers in Arms" | Dennie Gordon | Alfredo Barrios, Jr. | June 27, 2013 | BN704 | 3.87 |
| 103 | 5 | "Exit Plan" | Marc Roskin | Michael Horowitz | July 11, 2013 | BN705 | 3.04 |
| 104 | 6 | "All or Nothing" | Jonathan Frakes | Rashad Raisani | July 18, 2013 | BN706 | 2.86 |
| 105 | 7 | "Psychological Warfare" | Larry Teng | Ryan Johnson & Peter Lalayanis | July 25, 2013 | BN707 | 3.06 |
| 106 | 8 | "Nature of the Beast" | Tawnia McKiernan | Bridget Tyler | August 1, 2013 | BN708 | 3.60 |
| 107 | 9 | "Bitter Pill" | Bill Eagles | Alfredo Barrios, Jr. & Daniel Tuch | August 8, 2013 | BN709 | 3.69 |
| 108 | 10 | "Things Unseen" | Craig Siebels | Ben Watkins & Craig O'Neill | August 15, 2013 | BN710 | 3.66 |
| 109 | 11 | "Tipping Point" | Scott Peters | Rashad Raisani & Michael Horowitz | August 22, 2013 | BN711 | 3.64 |
| 110 | 12 | "Sea Change" | Stephen Surjik | Ryan Johnson & Peter Lalayanis | September 5, 2013 | BN712 | 3.79 |
| 111 | 13 | "Reckoning" | Matt Nix | Matt Nix | September 12, 2013 | BN713 | 4.97 |

=== Television film (2011) ===
The prequel film "The Fall of Sam Axe" both explores Sam's downfall shortly prior to the opening of the series and sets up elements of season five.

| Title | Directed by | Written by | Original release date | US viewers (millions) |
|---|---|---|---|---|
| Burn Notice: The Fall of Sam Axe | Jeffrey Donovan | Story by : Matt Nix & Greg Hart; Teleplay by : Matt Nix | April 17, 2011 | 3.57 |
Set two years before the events of the pilot, the film tells the story of Sam's SEAL days before he reconnects with Michael in Miami. Stars Chandra West, RonReaco Lee, Pedro Pascal, Kiele Sanchez, and John Diehl. Jeffrey Donovan has a cameo appearance as Michael Westen.

== Ratings ==
Burn Notice : U.S. viewers per episode (millions)

| Season | Episode number | | | | | | | | | | | | | | | | | |
| Season | 1 | 2 | 3 | 4 | 5 | 6 | 7 | 8 | 9 | 10 | 11 | 12 | 13 | 14 | 15 | 16 | 17 | 18 |
|---|---|---|---|---|---|---|---|---|---|---|---|---|---|---|---|---|---|---|
| 1 | 3.99 | 3.94 | 3.25 | 3.33 | 3.51 | 4.41 | 4.14 | 4.23 | 4.08 | 4.02 | 4.78 | 4.78 | – | | | | | |
| 2 | 5.39 | 4.87 | 4.76 | 4.86 | 4.56 | 3.88 | 3.86 | 4.77 | 4.67 | 5.12 | 5.38 | 5.27 | 4.84 | 4.67 | 4.85 | 6.09 | – | |
| 3 | 5.99 | 5.24 | 5.78 | 5.35 | 5.51 | 6.66 | 6.80 | 6.63 | 7.59 | 5.35 | 5.30 | 4.25 | 4.66 | 4.12 | 4.50 | 4.32 | – | |
| 4 | 6.62 | 5.67 | 5.31 | 5.33 | 5.21 | 5.65 | 5.87 | 5.38 | 5.69 | 5.57 | 5.50 | 6.29 | 4.32 | 3.50 | 3.70 | 4.34 | 4.77 | 5.11 |
| 5 | 5.17 | 4.67 | 4.88 | 5.39 | 5.39 | 5.00 | 5.21 | 4.75 | 5.32 | 4.58 | 4.07 | 4.39 | 2.86 | 2.66 | 2.36 | 3.12 | 2.79 | 2.89 |
| 6 | 3.87 | 4.09 | 4.11 | 4.44 | 4.97 | 4.86 | 4.32 | 4.04 | 4.36 | 4.96 | 3.47 | 3.47 | 3.17 | 3.14 | 3.16 | 2.86 | 3.78 | 3.78 |
| 7 | 4.32 | 4.29 | 3.40 | 3.87 | 3.04 | 2.86 | 3.06 | 3.60 | 3.69 | 3.66 | 3.64 | 3.79 | 4.97 | – | | | | |
| The Movie | 3.57 | – | | | | | | | | | | | | | | | | |

Audience measurement performed by Nielsen Media Research

== Home video releases ==
| Season | Episodes | DVD release dates | | | |
| Season | Episodes | Region 1 | Region 2 | Region 4 | Discs |
|---|---|---|---|---|---|
| 1 | 12 | June 17, 2008 | March 2, 2009 | December 3, 2008 | 4 |
| 2 | 16 | June 16, 2009 | April 5, 2010 | May 5, 2010 | 4 |
| 3 | 16 | June 1, 2010 | March 7, 2011 | August 18, 2010 | 4 |
| 4 | 18 | June 7, 2011 | December 26, 2011 | February 8, 2012 | 4 |
| Film | | July 26, 2011 | April 2, 2012 | February 8, 2012 | 1 |
| 5 | 18 | June 5, 2012 | December 3, 2012 | June 20, 2012 | 4 |
| 6 | 18 | June 11, 2013 | October 14, 2013 | December 11, 2013 | 4 |
| 7 | 13 | December 17, 2013 | July 7, 2014 | June 25, 2014 | 4 |
| Total | 111 | December 17, 2013 | July 7, 2014 | TBA | 28 |
