= List of Haven episodes =

Haven is a supernatural drama television series developed for television by Sam Ernst and Jim Dunn based on the 2005 Stephen King novel The Colorado Kid. The one-hour drama premiered on July 9, 2010 on Syfy, and concluded on December 17, 2015. Haven tells the story of Audrey Parker (Emily Rose), an FBI Agent with no past and no family, who is sent to the small town of Haven, Maine to investigate the murder of an ex-convict. Partnering with local police officer Nathan Wuornos (Lucas Bryant), Audrey soon discovers that the small town is a safe-haven for people with supernatural abilities and that the town itself may have a shocking connection to her long-missing past. The series is the first property to be produced for Syfy channels around the globe, excluding Canada and Scandinavia.

On January 28, 2014, the show was renewed for a split 26-episode fifth season. The first half aired in 2014, while the second half aired in the last quarter of 2015. In August 2015, Syfy cancelled the series after five seasons. During the course of the series, 78 episodes of Haven aired over five seasons.

== Series overview ==
| Season | Episodes | | Originally released | |
| Season | Episodes | | First released | Last released |
|---|---|---|---|---|
| 1 | 13 | | July 9, 2010 | October 8, 2010 |
| 2 | 13 | | July 15, 2011 | December 6, 2011 |
| 3 | 13 | | September 21, 2012 | January 17, 2013 |
| 4 | 13 | | September 13, 2013 | December 13, 2013 |
| 5 | 26 | 13 | September 11, 2014 | December 5, 2014 |
| 5 | 26 | 13 | October 8, 2015 | December 17, 2015 |

== Episodes ==
=== Season 1 (2010) ===
| No. overall | No. in season | Title | Directed by | Written by | Original release date | US viewers (millions) |
|---|---|---|---|---|---|---|
| 1 | 1 | "Welcome to Haven" | Adam Kane | Sam Ernst & Jim Dunn | July 9, 2010 | 2.34 |
| 2 | 2 | "Butterfly" | Tim Southam | Sam Ernst | July 16, 2010 | 2.09 |
| 3 | 3 | "Harmony" | Rachel Talalay | Matt McGuinness | July 23, 2010 | 1.84 |
| 4 | 4 | "Consumed" | Rachel Talalay | Ann Hamilton | July 30, 2010 | 2.13 |
| 5 | 5 | "Ball and Chain" | Tim Southam | Nikki Toscano | August 6, 2010 | 1.88 |
| 6 | 6 | "Fur" | Keith Samples | Jim Dunn | August 13, 2010 | 2.00 |
| 7 | 7 | "Sketchy" | T. W. Peacocke | Matt McGuinness | August 20, 2010 | 1.89 |
| 8 | 8 | "Ain't No Sunshine" | Ken Girotti | Sam Ernst | August 27, 2010 | 1.97 |
| 9 | 9 | "As You Were" | Rob Lieberman | Jose Molina | September 10, 2010 | 1.76 |
| 10 | 10 | "The Hand You're Dealt" | Rick Rosenthal | Jim Dunn | September 17, 2010 | 1.59 |
| 11 | 11 | "The Trial of Audrey Parker" | Lee Rose | Story by : Charles Ardai; Teleplay by : Sam Ernst & Jose Molina | September 24, 2010 | 1.41 |
| 12 | 12 | "Resurfacing" | Mike Rohl | Charles Ardai | October 1, 2010 | 1.44 |
| 13 | 13 | "Spiral" | Fred Gerber | Sam Ernst & Jim Dunn | October 8, 2010 | 1.70 |

=== Season 2 (2011) ===
| No. overall | No. in season | Title | Directed by | Written by | Original release date | US viewers (millions) |
|---|---|---|---|---|---|---|
| 14 | 1 | "A Tale of Two Audreys" | T. W. Peacocke | Sam Ernst & Jim Dunn | July 15, 2011 | 1.88 |
| 15 | 2 | "Fear & Loathing" | Rob Lieberman | Gabrielle Stanton | July 22, 2011 | 1.84 |
| 16 | 3 | "Love Machine" | T. W. Peacocke | Story by : Matt McGuinness; Teleplay by : Matt McGuinness & Nora Zuckerman & Lilla Zuckerman | July 29, 2011 | 2.00 |
| 17 | 4 | "Sparks and Recreation" | Lynne Stopkewich | Jonathan Abrahams | August 5, 2011 | 1.82 |
| 18 | 5 | "Roots" | Tim Southam | Jim Dunn | August 12, 2011 | 1.89 |
| 19 | 6 | "Audrey Parker's Day Off" | Fred Gerber | Nora Zuckerman & Lilla Zuckerman | August 19, 2011 | 1.74 |
| 20 | 7 | "The Tides That Bind" | Paolo Barzman | Gabrielle Stanton | August 26, 2011 | 1.91 |
| 21 | 8 | "Friend or Faux" | Stephen Reynolds | Sam Ernst | September 2, 2011 | 1.46 |
| 22 | 9 | "Lockdown" | Jason Priestley | Nora Zuckerman & Lilla Zuckerman | September 9, 2011 | 1.91 |
| 23 | 10 | "Who, What, Where, Wendigo?" | Lee Rose | Jonathan Abrahams | September 16, 2011 | 2.02 |
| 24 | 11 | "Business as Usual" | Shawn Piller | Matt McGuinness & Gabrielle Stanton | September 23, 2011 | 1.87 |
| 25 | 12 | "Sins of the Fathers" | Lee Rose | Sam Ernst & Jim Dunn | September 30, 2011 | 1.80 |
| 26 | 13 | "Silent Night" | Shawn Piller | Brian Millikin | December 6, 2011 | 1.20 |

=== Season 3 (2012–13) ===
| No. overall | No. in season | Title | Directed by | Written by | Original release date | US viewers (millions) |
|---|---|---|---|---|---|---|
| 27 | 1 | "301" | Lee Rose | Jonathan Abrahams | September 21, 2012 | 2.00 |
| 28 | 2 | "Stay" | Shawn Piller | Matt McGuiness | September 28, 2012 | 1.44 |
| 29 | 3 | "The Farmer" | T. W. Peacocke | Sam Ernst & Jim Dunn | October 5, 2012 | 1.57 |
| 30 | 4 | "Over My Head" | Rob Lieberman | Gabrielle Stanton | October 12, 2012 | 1.72 |
| 31 | 5 | "Double Jeopardy" | Nisha Ganatra | Nora Zuckerman & Lilla Zuckerman | October 19, 2012 | 1.45 |
| 32 | 6 | "Real Estate" | Jason Priestley | Brian Millikin | October 26, 2012 | 1.41 |
| 33 | 7 | "Magic Hour (Part 1)" | Paul Fox | Shernold Edwards | November 2, 2012 | 1.55 |
| 34 | 8 | "Magic Hour (Part 2)" | Paul Fox | Sam Ernst & Jim Dunn | November 9, 2012 | 1.60 |
| 35 | 9 | "Sarah" | Stephen Reynolds | Nora Zuckerman & Lilla Zuckerman | November 16, 2012 | 1.62 |
| 36 | 10 | "Burned" | T. W. Peacocke | Charles Ardai | November 30, 2012 | 1.53 |
| 37 | 11 | "Last Goodbyes" | Steven A. Adelson | Brian Millikin & Shernold Edwards | December 7, 2012 | 1.56 |
| 38 | 12 | "Reunion" | Lee Rose | Gabrielle Stanton | January 17, 2013 | 1.31 |
| 39 | 13 | "Thanks for the Memories" | Shawn Piller | Sam Ernst & Jim Dunn | January 17, 2013 | 1.36 |

=== Season 4 (2013) ===
| No. overall | No. in season | Title | Directed by | Written by | Original release date | US viewers (millions) |
|---|---|---|---|---|---|---|
| 40 | 1 | "Fallout" | Shawn Piller | Gabrielle Stanton | September 13, 2013 | 1.55 |
| 41 | 2 | "Survivors" | Shawn Piller | Nora Zuckerman & Lilla Zuckerman | September 20, 2013 | 1.36 |
| 42 | 3 | "Bad Blood" | Rob Lieberman | Shernold Edwards | September 27, 2013 | 1.54 |
| 43 | 4 | "Lost and Found" | Lee Rose | Speed Weed | October 4, 2013 | 1.49 |
| 44 | 5 | "The New Girl" | Rick Bota | Brian Millikin | October 11, 2013 | 1.59 |
| 45 | 6 | "Countdown" | Jeff Renfroe | Matt McGuiness | October 18, 2013 | 1.45 |
| 46 | 7 | "Lay Me Down" | Paul Fox | Nora Zuckerman & Lilla Zuckerman | October 25, 2013 | 1.45 |
| 47 | 8 | "Crush" | Stephen Reynolds | Speed Weed | November 1, 2013 | 1.33 |
| 48 | 9 | "William" | Grant Harvey | Shernold Edwards | November 8, 2013 | 1.72 |
| 49 | 10 | "The Trouble with Troubles" | T. W. Peacocke | Nora Zuckerman & Lilla Zuckerman & Brian Millikin | November 15, 2013 | 1.57 |
| 50 | 11 | "Shot in the Dark" | Mairzee Almas | Nick Parker | November 22, 2013 | 1.46 |
| 51 | 12 | "When the Bough Breaks" | Lee Rose | Speed Weed & Shernold Edwards | December 6, 2013 | 1.36 |
| 52 | 13 | "The Lighthouse" | Shawn Piller | Matt McGuiness & Gabrielle Stanton | December 13, 2013 | 1.25 |

=== Season 5 (2014–15) ===
| No. overall | No. in season | Title | Directed by | Written by | Original release date | US viewers (millions) |
|---|---|---|---|---|---|---|
Part 1
| 53 | 1 | "See No Evil" | Shawn Piller | Matt McGuinness & Gabrielle Stanton | September 11, 2014 | 1.04 |
| 54 | 2 | "Speak No Evil" | Shawn Piller | Matt McGuinness & Gabrielle Stanton | September 18, 2014 | 1.02 |
| 55 | 3 | "Spotlight" | T. W. Peacocke | Speed Weed & Shernold Edwards | September 25, 2014 | 0.85 |
| 56 | 4 | "Much Ado About Mara" | T. W. Peacocke | Speed Weed & Shernold Edwards | October 2, 2014 | 0.72 |
| 57 | 5 | "The Old Switcheroo (Part 1)" | Jeff Ronfroe | Cindy McCreery & Scott Shepherd | October 10, 2014 | 0.82 |
| 58 | 6 | "The Old Switcheroo (Part 2)" | Jeff Ronfroe | Cindy McCreery & Scott Shepherd | October 17, 2014 | 0.95 |
| 59 | 7 | "Nowhere Man" | Rob Lieberman | Brian Millikin | October 24, 2014 | 0.76 |
| 60 | 8 | "Exposure" | Rob Lieberman | Nick Parker | October 31, 2014 | 0.85 |
| 61 | 9 | "Morbidity" | Rick Bota | Speed Weed | November 7, 2014 | 0.79 |
| 62 | 10 | "Mortality" | Rick Bota | Adam Higgs | November 14, 2014 | 0.86 |
| 63 | 11 | "Reflections" | Grant Harvey | Shernold Edwards | November 21, 2014 | 0.77 |
| 64 | 12 | "Chemistry" | Grant Harvey | Y. Shireen Razack | November 28, 2014 | 0.87 |
| 65 | 13 | "Chosen" | Shawn Piller | Matt McGuiness | December 5, 2014 | 0.91 |
Part 2
| 66 | 14 | "New World Order" | Shawn Piller | Brian Millikin & Nick Parker | October 8, 2015 | 0.75 |
| 67 | 15 | "Power" | Rick Bota | Adam Higgs | October 8, 2015 | 0.55 |
| 68 | 16 | "The Trial of Nathan Wuornos" | Rick Bota | Speed Weed | October 15, 2015 | 0.70 |
| 69 | 17 | "Enter Sandman" | Lucas Bryant | Shernold Edwards | October 22, 2015 | 0.59 |
| 70 | 18 | "Wild Card" | Lee Rose | Brian Millikin & Nick Parker | October 29, 2015 | 0.65 |
| 71 | 19 | "Perditus" | Lee Rose | Gabrielle Stanton & Adam Higgs | November 5, 2015 | 0.80 |
| 72 | 20 | "Just Passing Through" | Colin Ferguson | Sam Ernst & Jim Dunn | November 12, 2015 | 0.72 |
| 73 | 21 | "Close to Home" | Sudz Sutherland | Joshua Brandon | November 19, 2015 | 0.66 |
| 74 | 22 | "A Matter of Time" | Sudz Sutherland | Brian Millikin | November 26, 2015 | 0.53 |
| 75 | 23 | "Blind Spot" | T.W. Peacocke | Y. Shireen Razack | December 3, 2015 | 0.62 |
| 76 | 24 | "The Widening Gyre" | T.W. Peacocke | Nick Parker | December 10, 2015 | 0.74 |
| 77 | 25 | "Now" | Shawn Piller | Gabrielle Stanton | December 17, 2015 | 0.68 |
| 78 | 26 | "Forever" | Shawn Piller | Matt McGuiness | December 17, 2015 | 0.53 |
