= Cross (American TV series) =

2024 American television series

- Genre: Crime thriller
- Created by: Ben Watkins
- Based on: Alex Cross by James Patterson
- Showrunner: Ben Watkins
- Starring: Aldis Hodge; Isaiah Mustafa; Juanita Jennings; Alona Tal; Samantha Walkes; Caleb Elijah; Melody Hurd; Jennifer Wigmore; Eloise Mumford; Ryan Eggold; Jeanine Mason; Wes Chatham; Johnny Ray Gill; Matthew Lillard; Ethan Embry
- Music by: Ali Shaheed Muhammad; Adrian Younge
- Country of origin: United States
- Original language: English
- No. of seasons: 2
- No. of episodes: 16

Production
- Executive producers: Ben Watkins; Craig Siebels; Nzingha Stewart; James Patterson; Sam Ernst; Jim Dunn; Bill Robinson; Patrick Santa; David Ellison; Dana Goldberg; Matt Thunell; Aiyana White; J. David Shanks; Owen Shiflett; Aldis Hodge
- Producer: Chris Agoston
- Cinematography: Brendan Steacy; Jeremy Benning; Maya Bankovic; Claudine Sauvé
- Editors: Roslyn Kalloo; Jorge Weisz; Steven Lang; Geoff Ashenhurst; Matt Coleshill; Roslyn Kalloo; Joel Varickanickal
- Running time: 47–62 minutes
- Production companies: Blue Monday Productions; Skydance Television (season 1); Paramount Television Studios; Amazon MGM Studios

Original release
- Network: Amazon Prime Video
- Release: November 14, 2024 – present

Cross is an American crime thriller television series created by Ben Watkins, based on the Alex Cross novel series written by James Patterson. It stars Aldis Hodge, Isaiah Mustafa, and Juanita Jennings, and it premiered on Amazon Prime Video on November 14, 2024. The series follows Alex Cross, a forensic psychologist and D.C. Metro homicide detective, alongside his partner, Detective John Sampson, as they pursue some of America's most dangerous killers. Together, they navigate the perils of the criminal underworld while Alex strives to safeguard his family from its threats. Along with Watkins, the series' executive producers included Craig Siebels, Nzingha Stewart, James Patterson, Sam Ernst, Jim Dunn, Bill Robinson, Patrick Santa, David Ellison, Dana Goldberg, and Matt Thunell. The series was produced by Blue Monday Productions, Skydance Television, Paramount Television Studios, and Amazon MGM Studios.

The series was filmed in Ontario, Canada, in Hamilton, Toronto, and surrounding areas. It was in development for nearly four years. The series was renewed for a second season before the premiere of its first season. The second season was released on February 11, 2026. In March 2026, the series was renewed for a third season.

== Premise ==
Alex Cross is a Washington, D.C., homicide detective and forensic psychologist who is also a devoted father and family man. Driven by an obsessive determination to delve into the minds of killers and victims, he works tirelessly to uncover the truth and bring perpetrators to justice. Struggling with escalating temper issues and resisting therapy for over a year after the murder of his wife, Cross considers taking a leave of absence. However, he is drawn into a high-profile case involving the murder of a local Defund the Police/Black Lives Matter activist. The politically overambitious White police chief, seeking both a Black detective as the public face of the controversial investigation and a swift resolution, complicates matters further.

== Cast ==
=== Main ===
- Aldis Hodge as Alex Cross, a Washington, D.C. police detective and forensic psychologist
- Isaiah Mustafa as Detective John Sampson, Alex's Washington, D.C. Metro Police Department partner
- Juanita Jennings as Regina "Nana Mama" Cross, Alex's grandmother
- Alona Tal as Kayla Craig, an FBI agent who helps Alex out, has a romantic fling with Sampson on the side (Season 1), and later becomes involved with Cross (Season 2)
- Samantha Walkes as Elle Monteiro, Alex's love interest who is an executive director of a nonprofit organization
- Caleb Elijah as Damon Cross, Alex's son
- Melody Hurd as Janelle "Jannie" Cross, Alex's daughter
- Jennifer Wigmore as Chief April Anderson (season 1; recurring season 2), the Chief of Police, Washington, D.C. Metro Police Department
- Ryan Eggold as Ed Ramsey (season 1), a wealthy man with a lot of power in Washington, D.C. with secrets
- Eloise Mumford as Shannon Witmer (season 1), a woman that Ed meets in a dating app
- Jeanine Mason as Rebecca (season 2), a woman targeting billionaires who have ties with human trafficking underage children
- Wes Chatham as Donnie (season 2), Rebecca's partner in crime
- Johnny Ray Gill as Bobby Trey (season 2; recurring season 1), a former cop who now works for Ed
- Matthew Lillard as Lance Durand (season 2), the billionaire CEO of Crestbrook Industries
- Ethan Embry as Frederick (season 3)

=== Recurring ===
- Matt Baram as Detective Bill Hardy
- Mercedes de la Zerda as Detective Amielynn Vega
- Stacie Greenwell as Detective Shawna De Lackner
- Dwain Murphy as Detective Akbar
- Siobhan Murphy as Tania Hightower, a journalist who wants to get the scoop on the murder investigations
- Jason Rogel as Chris Wu
- Chaunteé Schuler Irving as Maria Cross, Alex's deceased wife
- Sharon Taylor as Lieutenant Oracene Massey, Alex's direct superior
- Karen Robinson as Miss Nancy
- Deidrie Henry as LaDonna (season 2), John's birth mother
- Rene Moran as Lincoln (season 2)
- Ben Watkins as Roy (season 2), Kayla's boss
- Michelle C. Bonilla as Clare (season 2), Rebecca's aunt
- Carlos Solórzano as Berto (season 2), a young boy that Cross takes in who was being human trafficked
- Ron Perlman as Herschel Zamora (season 3)
- Robin Givens as Senator Mulrooney (season 3)

== Episodes ==
=== Series overview ===
Season	Episodes	Originally released	
Season	Episodes	First released	Last released
1	8	November 14, 2024	
2	8	February 11, 2026	March 18, 2026

=== Season 1 (2024) ===
No. overall	No. in season	Title	Directed by	Written by	Original release date
1	1	"Hero Complex"	Nzingha Stewart	Ben Watkins	November 14, 2024
Washington, D.C. Detective Alex Cross is tasked with investigating the chilling murder of Black Lives Matter activist Emir Goodspeed. Found seated in his car with his head shaved, the scene raises alarming questions. While initial police speculation points to a drug overdose, feeding the defund the police animosity, the autopsy reveals a far more sinister truth. After going into detail over what he has eaten – which curiously includes pork despite him being a Muslim convert – Alex is convinced that Emir was murdered. When he presents his findings to the Chief, highlighting evidence of drugs, the peculiar choice of food, and other discrepancies, he theorizes that Emir was force-fed the pork before being killed. This draws Alex into a case fraught with complexity and intrigue.
2	2	"Ride the White Horsey"	Nzingha Stewart	Aiyana White	November 14, 2024
The murder of Emir Goodspeed ignites a firestorm across D.C., ensnaring others in its wake. John urges Alex to get his act together and highlights the unresolved drama surrounding Emir's and Tavio's deaths. Tavio's phone, which was visibly present at the crime scene when he was shot, has gone missing. It turns out Vanessa, Tavio's girlfriend and the mother of his child, took the phone. She is determined to seek justice on their own terms, convinced that the police will not deliver it. Meanwhile, D.C. powerbroker Ed Ramsey sets his sights on his next target, an art enthusiast named Shannon Witmer who resembles Aileen Wuornos, weaving her into his web of intrigue.
3	3	"The Good Book"	Craig Siebels	Ron McCants & Sam Ernst	November 14, 2024
Alex seeks a warrant to search an apartment on Price Street belonging to Ed Ramsey, but the judge initially denies the request, citing insufficient evidence to justify a major investigation. However, after reconsideration, the judge eventually grants the warrant. Meanwhile, Shannon wakes up in a basement, bound and facing a camera. She is forced to participate in Ed's twisted games, starting with a bizarre "facemask" ritual. Elsewhere, Alex conducts a raid on a home connected to Emir's murder. Although the suspect manages to escape, they leave behind a uniquely incriminating piece of evidence that narrows the list of suspects to an exclusive group within D.C.'s elite.
4	4	"Masks"	Craig Siebels	Blaize Ali-Watkins & Jim Dunn	November 14, 2024
As Alex closes in on Ed, the killer keeps Shannon tied up in a basement closet at his next house. Ed even hires workers to soundproof the space, preparing it for his gruesome acts. Meanwhile, the Cross family faces ongoing torment from a shadowy figure connected to Deirdre Nolan. During the investigation, Alex uncovers a chilling connection: a serial killer's handbook that mirrors the methods used in a string of murders. Astonishingly, even serial killers themselves are being targeted in the same manner. The book becomes a vital clue in finding Shannon, who has been declared missing. With 11 completed cases and one more to complete the pattern, the book appears to hold the final piece of the puzzle. John and Alex quickly connect this to Shannon and the use of dating apps. Their investigation leads them to e-Fling, an app that allows matches with any gender. By analyzing profiles and matches linked to both Emir and Shannon, Alex works to uncover the critical link that could solve the case.
5	5	"What Happens at Ramsey's"	Stacey Muhammad	Gary Lundy	November 14, 2024
Alex arrives, signaling that things are about to escalate. Before diving in, he and his partner decide to dig into Ed Ramsey's past, searching for any vulnerabilities they can exploit. Fortunately, an invitation from Elle to Ed's birthday party provides the perfect opportunity for Alex to confront him without the constraints of legal representation. During the annual soiree at Ed's house, Alex and Elle share a meal with the enigmatic host. The night takes a sinister turn when Alex realizes that Ed's next victim may already be in the house. Meanwhile, John conducts background research and interviews Dex Notrale, Ed's former neighbor, who admits he always suspected something was off about him. Adding to the intrigue, John discovers that Ed's mother is still alive, despite Ed's claims to the contrary. It becomes clear that Ed has fabricated parts of his past to maintain his tortured artist persona. Alex skillfully unnerves Ed during their encounter, even bringing up the infamous "Fanboy" moniker. However, Ed strikes back later at the dinner table, recounting an unsettlingly detailed story about Alex's personal life, including mentions of Nana Mama and his children, leaving Alex rattled by the depth of Ed's knowledge.
6	6	"A Bang, Not a Whimper"	Stacey Muhammad	Teleplay by : Ali Salerno; Story by : Ali Salerno & Sonja Perryman	November 14, 2024
A new lead takes Alex to Philadelphia, accompanied by his son, Damon. As they journey together, father and son bond over their shared grief from Maria's death. Alex is determined to pursue the case, but Damon's rebellious attitude and emotional need for his father complicate things. Nana Mama, however, is firm in her stance—Damon is coming along, no arguments allowed. With that settled, the duo heads to Philly. Once there, Alex pays a visit to White Mike, specifically seeking out lead singer Michael Grisham. Mike welcomes Alex and opens up about Ed's dark obsession with death and murder, which overshadowed his passion for music. Mike recounts how Ed once unearthed a knife and sent it to him, but Mike quickly returned it, having used it to kill a man (recorded on video also) named Rodney McKay. Noticing Mike's jittery behavior, Alex realizes he was actually present during the killing. Michael expresses deep regret for not going to the police sooner, haunted by his failure to act. Alex passes the tape to Craig, who brings Mike back to DC, where she passes him to the police. Massey brings Mike to a witness protection safe house. Alex recalls voice messages left by Maria and his son helps comfort him. Mike is shot by Massey, whose wrist shows the same circular tattoo of Ramsey's club.
7	7	"Happy Birthday"	Director X	Sam Ernst & Jim Dunn	November 14, 2024
Alex has a sudden realization and quickly heads to see Senator Caitlin. He presses her about Ed Ramsay and what happened at Ed's party, knowing she witnessed something unsettling. Caitlin, visibly shaken, recalls the haunting image of blood-stained hands, confirming Alex's suspicions that Ed is indeed the serial killer. She insists that he never reveal what she has shared, and Alex vows to keep the secret. Meanwhile, Shannon is forced to have her final meal before confronting Ed's twisted "mosaic of death." Just as Ed prepares to carry out his gruesome plans, he is interrupted by his lawyer, Witney, who informs him that the money has been frozen. However, for now, he is here to help prepare Shannon for what is to come. As the clock runs out on Shannon's life, Alex narrows in on Ed Ramsey who is acting as Herb Baumeister. Just as Ed enters Shannon's room to administer a lethal injection, he is stopped by John and Alex showing up and shooting the lethal injection machine. Ed runs and John checks on Shannon. Ed escapes in a car he has hidden and drives to his house. Alex, John and Craig show up just as Ed injects himself in his office with a syringe. Ed is pronounced dead. Damon had his rehearsal recital and Peter Lenox shows up. We see through Alex's mind what Peter Lenox went through when Deirdre was in prison. Ed wakes up later in the morgue, and goes to Shannon's room to finish the job. Ed is stopped from administering a drug to her IV when Alex shows up. Just as it seems like the case is finally over, the danger is not finished yet. Peter Lenox breaks into Alex's home that night, tackling Regina to the ground in a shocking turn of events.
8	8	"You Had Me at Motherfucker"	Carl Seaton	Ben Watkins & Aiyana White	November 14, 2024
Alex soon learns that Peter Lenox's family is deceased, but he had a "street mom" he called Miss Nancy. As Alex digs deeper, he realizes Miss Nancy manipulated Deidre into confessing to Peter's crime, believing her privilege would shield her. With his family in greater danger, Alex races to save them. Meanwhile, Ed Ramsey summons Alex to confess to all 11 murders, but instead Alex shifts suspicion to Bobby Trey to deny Ramsey the notoriety. John burns the incriminating book on a live feed, framing Bobby as a "crooked ex-cop turned serial killer" and declaring Ramsey clinically insane. Ramsey is only charged with the murder of Emir and the kidnapping of Shannon. Chief Anderson confirms to Alex that she plans to run for Mayor. Malika swallows her pride, collects Emir's belongings, and thanks John and Alex for solving the case. After Damon's piano recital, Alex visits Maria's grave and begins therapy to confront his past. Bobby Trey, now labeled America's Most Wanted and the Fanboy Killer, is offered a deal. He provides intel on six victims and corrupt officials in exchange for immunity and a reduced sentence.

=== Season 2 (2026) ===
No. overall	No. in season	Title	Directed by	Written by	Original release date
9	1	"Harrow"	Craig Siebels	Ben Watkins & Marissa Lee	February 11, 2026
10	2	"Scatter"	Craig Siebels	Jim Dunn	February 11, 2026
11	3	"Feed"	Stacey Muhammad	J. David Shanks	February 11, 2026
12	4	"Harden"	Stacey Muhammad	Sonja Perryman	February 18, 2026
13	5	"Climb"	R. T. Thorne	Alexandra Salerno	February 25, 2026
14	6	"Gather"	R. T. Thorne	Ron McCants	March 4, 2026
15	7	"Winnow"	Tiffany K. Guillen	Sam Ernst	March 11, 2026
16	8	"Quemar"	Edward Ornelas	Ben Watkins & Aiyana White	March 18, 2026

== Production ==
=== Background ===
The first Alex Cross novel was published in 1993, and there have since been 31 additional novels in the series, as well as two novellas and three books centered on Alex's son, Ali. The Cross character has also been featured in three feature films: two moderately successful films (with Morgan Freeman in the role of Alex Cross), Kiss the Girls (1997) and Along Came a Spider (2001); and one box office bomb (with Tyler Perry as Cross), Alex Cross (2012).

=== Development ===
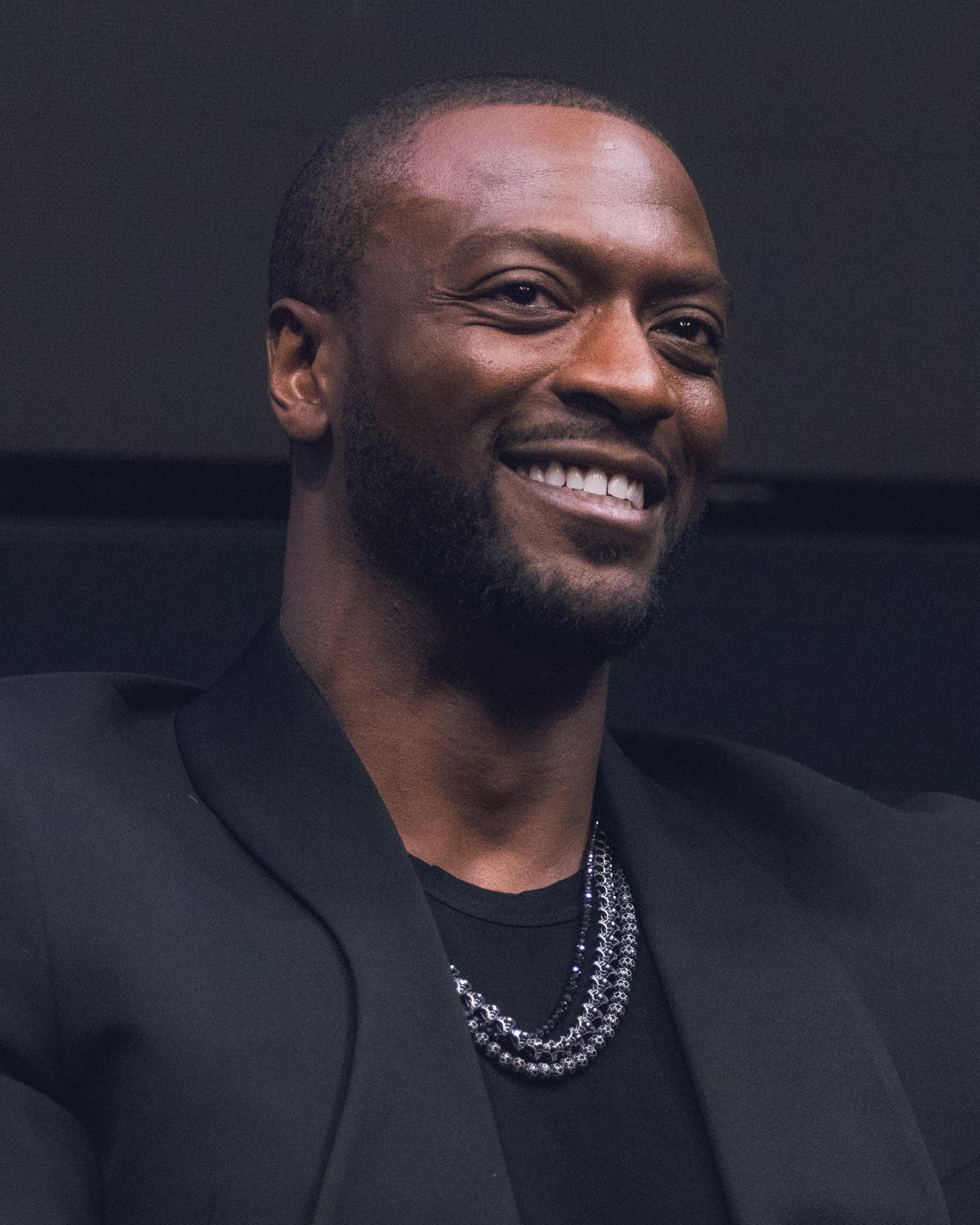
Aldis Hodge portrays the series' main character

On January 22, 2020, it was announced that Amazon Studios, Paramount Television Studios, and Skydance Television were teaming up to develop a television series based on James Patterson's Alex Cross novels. On October 27, 2022, it was given a series order by Prime Video, with Aldis Hodge in the title role and also producing, and Ben Watkins as showrunner and writer. The series is executive produced by Patterson, Watkins, Sam Ernst, Jim Dunn, Craig Siebels, Bill Robinson, Patrick Santa, David Ellison, Dana Goldberg, and Matt Thunnel. On April 30, 2024, ahead of the series premiere, Amazon Prime Video renewed the series for a second season. Paramount Television Studios whom produced the series with Skydance Television would assume full production of the series following the merger of Skydance Television's parent company Skydance Media with Paramount Television Studios' owner Paramount Global to form a new company Paramount Skydance one year later during production of the upcoming second series in August 2025. On March 18, 2026, Amazon Prime Video renewed the series for a third season.

=== Casting ===
Promotional poster from the first season.

On November 29, 2022, it was announced that Ryan Eggold and Isaiah Mustafa had joined the cast. On December 8, 2022, it was announced that Karen LeBlanc, Melody Hurd, Juanita Jennings, Caleb Elijah, Jennifer Wigmore, and Samantha Walkes had been added to the cast. LeBlanc was replaced by Sharon Taylor in a January 2023 recasting.

Upon the second season renewal announcement, Jeanine Mason was added to the cast for the new season. Wes Chatham and Matthew Lillard were also added to the cast for the second season. On December 4, 2025, Michelle C. Bonilla joined the cast in a recurring role for the second season. On April 17, 2026, Ethan Embry was cast as a series regular for the third season. On June 23, 2026, Ron Perlman joined the cast in a recurring role for the third season. On July 24, 2026, Robin Givens was cast in a recurring capacity for the third season.

=== Filming ===
Filming of both seasons took place in Ontario, Canada, with Hamilton, Ontario, set to feature prominently throughout both seasons of the series. Filming for the third season began in Toronto, Canada on April 13, 2026.

== Release ==
Cross premiered on November 14, 2024. All eight episodes of the first season were released on Amazon Prime Video. The second season premiered on February 11, 2026, with three new episodes, scheduled to be followed by a new episode on a weekly basis until the season finale on March 18, 2026.

== Reception ==
=== Critical response ===
Critical response of Cross
Season	Rotten Tomatoes	Metacritic
1	76% (42 reviews)	62 (21 reviews)
2	95% (19 reviews)	63 (6 reviews)

On the review aggregator website Rotten Tomatoes, the first season holds a 76% approval rating, based on 42 critic reviews. The website's critics consensus reads, "Cross' case for itself isn't closed just yet, but the commanding Aldis Hodge makes for the most arresting embodiment of James Patterson's literary creation yet." Metacritic, which uses a weighted average, assigned a score of 62 out of 100 based on 21 critics, indicating "generally favorable" reviews.

James Hibbs of Radio Times rated Cross two out of five stars, describing it as a "high-octane, entertaining cop drama" but criticized it as being "cliché-ridden". He praised Aldis Hodge's "charismatic performance" but noted that the series' "lack of story propulsion" makes it more suitable for binge-watching than episodic viewing. Kelly Lawler of USA Today awarded the season two out of four stars, criticizing its pacing and plotting. Lawler remarked, "While Hodge is superbly cast and the team is clearly striving to deliver a gripping crime story, the pacing, plotting, and big reveals feel just slightly off-key. It leaves you with the impression that what you've watched is an Alex Cross cover band—not the real thing."

Daniel Fienberg of The Hollywood Reporter praised Aldis Hodge's humor and the series' first season "satisfactory" ending, noting that despite its flaws, Cross provides Hodge with a much-deserved career-defining role. He described the show as something Amazon executes successfully, though not always perfectly.

The second season has a 95% approval rating on Rotten Tomatoes, based on 19 critic reviews. The website's critical consensus states, "Aldis Hodge leads Cross with fervor and a purpose, unifying the highs and lows for another emotionally resonant season." On Metacritic, it has a weighted average score of 63 out of 100 based on 6 reviews, indicating "generally favorable" reviews.

=== Awards and nominations ===
Year	Award	Category	Nominee(s)	Result	Ref.
2025	56th NAACP Image Awards	Outstanding Drama Series	Cross	Won	
2025	56th NAACP Image Awards	Outstanding Writing in a Drama Series	Ben Watkins	Won	
2025	56th NAACP Image Awards	Outstanding Actor in a Drama Series	Aldis Hodge	Nominated	
2025	56th NAACP Image Awards	Outstanding Performance by a Youth (Series, Special, Television Movie or Limited Series)	Caleb Elijah	Nominated	
2025	56th NAACP Image Awards	Outstanding Performance by a Youth (Series, Special, Television Movie or Limited Series)	Melody Hurd	Nominated	
2025	56th NAACP Image Awards	Outstanding Supporting Actor in a Drama Series	Isaiah Mustafa	Nominated	
2025	56th NAACP Image Awards	Outstanding Stunt Ensemble (Television or Film)	Angelica Lisk-Hann	Nominated	
2025	Canadian Society of Cinematographers Awards	Best Cinematography in TV Drama	Jeremy Benning	Nominated	
2025	Leo Awards	Best Supporting Performance Dramatic Series	Sharon Taylor	Nominated	
2025	Canadian Cinema Editors Awards	Best Editing in TV Drama	Jorge Weisz	Nominated	
2025	Black Reel Awards for Television	Outstanding Supporting Performance in a Drama Series	Isaiah Mustafa	Nominated	
2025	Black Reel Awards for Television	Outstanding Drama Series	Ben Watkins (showrunner)	Nominated	
2025	Black Reel Awards for Television	Outstanding Lead Performance in a Drama Series	Aldis Hodge	Nominated	
2025	Black Reel Awards for Television	Outstanding Guest Performance in a Drama Series	Karen Robinson	Nominated	
2025	Black Reel Awards for Television	Outstanding Score	Adrian Younge; Ali Shaheed Muhammad	Nominated	
2025	Black Reel Awards for Television	Outstanding Directing in a Drama Series	Director X For the episode "Happy Birthday"	Nominated	
2025	Black Reel Awards for Television	Outstanding Directing in a Drama Series	Nzingha Stewart For the episode "Hero Complex"	Nominated	
2025	Golden Trailer Awards	Best Horror/Thriller - TV/Streaming Series	Cross	Nominated	
2025	NAMIC Vision Awards	Best Performance - Drama	Aldis Hodge	Nominated	
2025	NAMIC Vision Awards	Best Drama	Cross	Nominated	
2025	Gotham TV Awards	Outstanding Lead Performance in a Drama Series	Aldis Hodge	Nominated	
