= Ben Watkins =

Ben Watkins may refer to:

- Ben Watkins (musician), head of British music group Juno Reactor
- Ben Watkins (producer), American television writer, producer, and showrunner

== See also ==
- Benjamin Watkins, Australian politician
