= Hand of God (TV series) =

2014 American drama series

- Title screen from season two
- Genre: Drama; Psychological thriller
- Created by: Ben Watkins
- Starring: Ron Perlman; Dana Delany; Andre Royo; Garret Dillahunt; Alona Tal; Emayatzy Corinealdi; Julian Morris; Elizabeth McLaughlin
- Opening theme: "An Honest Man", performed by Fantastic Negrito
- Country of origin: United States
- Original language: English
- No. of seasons: 2
- No. of episodes: 20

Production
- Executive producers: Marc Forster; Ron Pearlman; Ben Watkins; Brian Wilkins; Jillian Kugler; Jeff King
- Production location: Los Angeles
- Running time: 45–66 minutes
- Production companies: Universal Television; Alcon Television Group

Original release
- Network: Amazon Prime Video
- Release: August 28, 2014 – March 10, 2017

Hand of God is an American drama television series created by Ben Watkins. The premiere episode is one of two drama pilots that Amazon streamed online in August 2014, along with Hysteria. Viewers were allowed to offer their opinions about the pilot before the studio decided whether or not to place an order for the entire series. In October 2014, Hand of God was ordered to full series by Amazon Studios.

The series officially premiered on September 4, 2015. A second season was ordered in December 2015, which premiered on March 10, 2017. On September 15, 2016, Amazon Studios announced that the series would end after the second season.

== Plot ==
Hand of God follows Pernell Harris (Ron Perlman), a corrupt judge who suffers a breakdown and believes that God is compelling him onto a path of vigilante justice. He becomes a member of a church called Hand of God, which proves to be a dangerous cult.

== Cast ==
=== Main ===
- Ron Perlman as Pernell Harris
- Dana Delany as Crystal Harris
- Andre Royo as Robert "Bobo" Boston
- Garret Dillahunt as KD
- Alona Tal as Jocelyn Harris
- Emayatzy Corinealdi as Tessie Graham
- Julian Morris as Paul Curtis
- Elizabeth McLaughlin as Alicia Hopkins

=== Recurring ===
- Johnny Ferro as PJ Harris (Pernell Jr.)
- Cleavon McClendon as Asa Boston
- Maximiliano Hernández as Chief Toby Clay
- Anthony Starke as DA Gilbert McCauley
- Jon Tenney as Nick Tramble
- Tommy Day Carey as Detective Warren
- Elaine Tan as Anne Wu (season 1)
- Erykah Badu as April (season 1)
- Hunter Parrish as Josh Miller (season 1)
- Sandy Martin as Randy (guest season 1, recurring season 2)
- Jimmy Ray Bennett as Nathan Brooks (guest season 1, recurring season 2)
- Eric J. Krueger as Adam Rieders (guest season 1, recurring season 2)
- Emilio Rivera as Sgt. Kessler (guest season 1, recurring season 2)
- Nia Long as Izzy (season 2)
- Brian Baumgartner as Dr. Olonari (season 2)
- Guy Burnet as Raymond Kelly (season 2)

== Episodes ==
| Season | Episodes | | Originally released |
|---|---|---|---|
| 1 | 10 | 1 | August 28, 2014 |
| 1 | 10 | 9 | September 4, 2015 |
| 2 | 10 | | March 10, 2017 |

=== Season 1 (2014–2015) ===
| No. overall | No. in season | Title | Directed by | Written by | Original release date |
|---|---|---|---|---|---|
| 1 | 1 | "Pilot" | Marc Forster | Ben Watkins | August 28, 2014 |
| 2 | 2 | "Your Inside Voice" | Marc Forster | Ben Watkins | September 4, 2015 |
| 3 | 3 | "Contemplating the Body" | Richard J. Lewis | Ben Watkins & Daniel Tuch | September 4, 2015 |
| 4 | 4 | "He So Loved" | Sarah Pia Anderson | Becky Hartman Edwards | September 4, 2015 |
| 5 | 5 | "Welcome the Stranger" | Ernest R. Dickerson | Sam Forman | September 4, 2015 |
| 6 | 6 | "For the Rain to Gather" | Andrew Bernstein | Deborah Schoeneman | September 4, 2015 |
| 7 | 7 | "A Bird in Hand" | Peter Medak | Teleplay by : Mark Hudis; Story by : Mark Hudis & Ali Garfinkel | September 4, 2015 |
| 8 | 8 | "One Saved Message" | Mario Van Peebles | Ben Watkins & Ben Cory Jones | September 4, 2015 |
| 9 | 9 | "A Flower That Bees Prefer" | Stephen Williams | Theresa Rebeck | September 4, 2015 |
| 10 | 10 | "The Tie That Binds" | Brad Anderson | Ben Watkins | September 4, 2015 |

=== Season 2 (2017) ===
| No. overall | No. in season | Title | Directed by | Written by | Original release date |
|---|---|---|---|---|---|
| 11 | 1 | "Gathering Dust" | Mario Van Peebles | Ben Watkins & Jim Dunn | March 9, 2017 |
| 12 | 2 | "Telling Me Your Dreams" | Peter Medak | Ben Watkins & Sam Ernst | March 9, 2017 |
| 13 | 3 | "We Can't Go Back" | Christine Moore | Michael Angeli | March 9, 2017 |
| 14 | 4 | "Not Writing a Love Letter" | Sarah Pia Anderson | Daniel Tuch | March 9, 2017 |
| 15 | 5 | "I See That Now" | Ali Selim | Shernold Edwards | March 9, 2017 |
| 16 | 6 | "What Do You Hear..." | Stephen Surjik | Dawn Kamoche & Ariella Blejer | March 9, 2017 |
| 17 | 7 | "When You Pull the Trigger" | Tim Hunter | Teleplay by : Ben Watkins & Michael Angeli; Story by : Michael Kastelein & Chris Wu | March 9, 2017 |
| 18 | 8 | "The Last Thing Left" | Kate Woods | Jim Dunn | March 9, 2017 |
| 19 | 9 | "What a Man Can Be" | Peter Medak | Sam Ernst | March 9, 2017 |
| 20 | 10 | "He Must Be" | Ben Watkins | Ben Watkins | March 9, 2017 |

== Reception ==
The series has received mixed reviews from critics. On Metacritic, the first season has a score of 44 out of 100 based on 19 critics reviews, and an 8.2/10 from IGN. The average rating on TV.com is 8.3 out of 10 based on 33 ratings.

Emily VanDerWerff of Vox called the show "mind-bogglingly bad". Mike Hale of The New York Times wrote that it "loses its focus" and that it feels "attenuated and static". Mary McNamara of the Los Angeles Times gave the series a negative review, writing that it had great acting but "little else". David Sims of The Atlantic wrote that the climax of the series didn't "justify 10 depressing hours of television". In contrast, Robert Rorke of the NY Post called the show "oddly compelling", while Tirdad Derakhshani of The Philadelphia Inquirer wrote, "It's such an engaging, original, quirky, and thought-provoking drama, it should be seen."
