= On Call (TV series) =

2025 procedural drama television series

- Promotional poster
- Genre: Police procedural; Serial drama
- Created by: Tim Walsh; Elliot Wolf
- Showrunner: Ben Watkins
- Directed by: Eriq La Salle; Brenna Malloy
- Starring: Troian Bellisario; Brandon Larracuente
- Composer: Atli Örvarsson
- Country of origin: United States
- Original language: English
- No. of seasons: 1
- No. of episodes: 8

Production
- Executive producers: Dick Wolf; Tim Walsh; Elliot Wolf; Eriq La Salle; Arthur W. Forney; Peter Jankowski; Matthew Segal; Taye Shuayb
- Producer: Ryan Janata
- Production location: Long Beach
- Cinematography: Adam Silver
- Editors: Troy Takaki; Micky Blythe; Gustav Lindquist
- Running time: 27–32 minutes
- Production companies: Wolf Entertainment; Universal Television; Amazon MGM Studios; ATTN:

Original release
- Network: Prime Video
- Release: January 9, 2025

On Call is an American police procedural and serial drama created by Tim Walsh and Elliot Wolf for streaming on IMDb TV. The series stars Troian Bellisario and Brandon Larracuente and follows law enforcement officers of the Long Beach Police Department in California. The series was initially ordered in May 2021, with Elliot's father, Dick Wolf, attached as an executive producer with his production company, Wolf Entertainment. Ben Watkins later joined as the showrunner and also executive produced the show alongside Walsh, Elliot Wolf, and others.

It is the first streaming television series from Dick Wolf, as well as the first of his to be produced in a half-hour format. The program later shifted its release to Amazon Prime Video. Other members of the cast and crew include those who previously worked with Wolf on his other franchises. The show was filmed on-location in Long Beach in 2023 and utilized experimental techniques. On Call's eight episodes were released on January 9, 2025, with a soundtrack album following the day after. It received mixed reviews from critics. In May 2025, the series was canceled after one season, although was briefly pitched to other other networks.

== Premise ==
On Call follows Traci Harmon, a senior training officer with the Long Beach Police Department tasked with training rookie officer Alex Diaz. Throughout the episodes, Harmon and Diaz respond to emergency calls in Long Beach, California. An overarching story arc revolves around Harmon, Diaz, and other officers, assisting in the murder investigation of a fellow officer who was killed during a routine traffic stop. The series deals with the effects on the professional and personal lives of the officers involved in the case.

== Cast and characters ==
=== Main ===
- Troian Bellisario as Officer Traci Harmon
- Brandon Larracuente as Officer Alex Diaz

=== Recurring ===
- Eriq La Salle as Sergeant Lasman
- Lori Loughlin as Lieutenant Bishop
- Robert Bailey Jr. as Officer Holt
- Rich Ting as Detective Sergeant Tyson Koyama
- Mac Brandt as Officer Barlowe
- Lobo Sebastian as Smokey

=== Guest ===
- Monica Raymund as Officer Maria Delgado
- Ian Down as Eddie 'Maniac' Watson
- Annabella Didion as Leona

== Episodes ==
List of On Call episodes
No.	Title	Directed by	Written by	Original release date	Prod. code
1	"Pilot"	Eriq La Salle	Tim Walsh & Elliot Wolf	January 9, 2025	ONCL101
In Long Beach, Officer Maria Delgado is shot while performing a traffic stop. The car flees and Delgado dies in the street. Rookies Holt and Alex Diaz report for their first day as patrol officers. Diaz is paired with Officer Traci Harmon. Lieutenant Bishop informs Harmon, Diaz, Holt, Sergeant Lasman, and other officers that Eddie Watson has been identified as Delgado's shooter and that Juan Cortez was driving the vehicle. Bishop also says Watson uses the alias "Maniac" and that they are part of a street gang called East Barrio. It is believed they fled because they were trafficking drugs. Harmon gives Diaz a Get Out of Jail Free card. When the two respond to a domestic dispute, Harmon threatens the abuser, which is captured on Diaz's body cam. They receive a radio call that a Mustang with ties to East Barrio has been spotted. Harmon locates the vehicle and gets into a high-speed pursuit. After it crashes, Maniac runs on foot and Diaz disobeys an order by pursuing him. Diaz loses him and is reprimanded by Harmon. Harmon is also chastised by Bishop. Harmon admits to Diaz that Delgado was one of her previous trainees.
2	"Laws of the Universe"	Eriq La Salle	Tim Walsh & Elliot Wolf	January 9, 2025	ONCL102
Harmon and Diaz are dispatched to a street takeover where Officer Rolland is assaulted. Lasman and Harmon disagree on the best way to handle the situation. Diaz is irritated that he wasn't permitted to chase the instigator; Harmon takes him to where Delgado was murdered as a lesson over safety. The two are called to a homicide at a homeless encampment where a severed head was found. One of the residents tells Harmon that "the Sherriff" was recently spotted there and is looking for her. Diaz and Holt search a backpack two residents were fighting over, finding a hand that has a tattoo associated with East Barrio. Harmon and Diaz back up Detective Sergeant Tyson Koyama, who found a rival gang vehicle transporting drugs. One of the occupants says that East Barrio has vanished like La Llorona after Delgado's murder. At the end of shift, Harmon tells Diaz that he is better than his brother, who is in prison for armed robbery. Bishop informs Harmon that the hand was identified as belonging to Cortez, but that Maniac is still missing. Lasman asks Diaz if he witnessed Harmon threaten a suspect, showing him body cam footage from the domestic dispute; Diaz refuses to answer.
3	"South of Heaven"	Brenna Malloy	Molly Manning	January 9, 2025	ONCL103
Harmon, Diaz, Holt, and Barlowe, Holt's training officer, pursue a suspect accused of robbing a 7-Eleven with a hatchet. Diaz rescues a bystander who was pushed over the edge of an elevated walkway but his service weapon falls to the ground below. Holt later returns Diaz's weapon and suggests he leaves it out of his report; warning him that Harmon can't be trusted because several officers, including Lasman's former partner, were fired because of her actions. Diaz questions Harmon about this allegation but she gets defensive. Harmon later believes that this conversation with Diaz is affecting his training. Koyama tells Harmon that he wants her to take an open spot in his unit, but she doubts her transfer will be approved. He also says that detectives believe Maniac has fled to Mexico. Harmon visits Smokey, a local bar owner with ties to East Barrio. Their conversation leads her to believe that Maniac is still in Long Beach. Harmon and Diaz return to the homeless encampment when a woman is accused of torching area vehicles. While Diaz and Holt search the camp, Holt accidentally gets stabbed with a needle and overdoses, causing Diaz to give him Narcan.
4	"Unsung"	Brenna Malloy	Bryan Gracia	January 9, 2025	ONCL104
Holt takes an extended leave after receiving medical treatment. As Harmon and Diaz get to know each other, she tells him that her sister used to be a police officer, but moved to Los Angeles after an injury on the job. Following Delgado's funeral, Harmon and Diaz respond to a dispute at a motel. One of the suspects tells Harmon that members of East Barrio had been partying there the night before. She uses this information to flip the other suspect and gain a confidential informant, who tells Harmon that Maniac will be at a second motel later that evening. She and Diaz perform a stakeout; Harmon acquires Maniac's room number from the motel employee before calling for backup. When performing a tactical raid, several members of East Barrio are found and Maniac flees. Harmon follows him to an abandoned Walmart where the two get into an altercation. She gains the upper hand and holds him at gunpoint until Lasman arrives as backup and arrests him. Bishop questions Harmon on how she managed to single-handedly find Maniac, when an entire team of detectives were unable to. Harmon confides in Bishop, believing they are talking as friends rather than colleagues.
5	"Not Your Savior"	Eriq La Salle	Tiffany Bratcher	January 9, 2025	ONCL105
While on patrol, Diaz visits his mother who tells him that East Barrio has put a hit on his brother as retribution for Diaz arresting Maniac. Harmon and Diaz respond to an ex-couple fighting over custody of their child. Afterwards, Diaz asks Harmon if they can visit Smokey as an attempt take the hit off of his brother, but she insists that it's a lost cause. Harmon suggests protective custody, but Diaz says his brother won't accept it. The two witness an erratic vehicle and discover that the impaired driver left an area hospital without being discharged. Harmon and Diaz get into a heated argument when he asks about seeing Smokey once more, causing friction between them. They are interrupted by a couple arguing at a nearby gas station. The husband douses himself in gasoline before setting himself on fire, nearly killing their young son. At the end of their shift, Harmon explains to Diaz that she intervened when Lasman's former partner assaulted a suspect. She says she did not report it to internal affairs, but that several other officers believed she did and blame her for their firing. As a result, Lasman lost a promotion to lieutenant that Bishop received instead.
6	"L.A. Woman"	Eriq La Salle	Molly Manning	January 9, 2025	ONCL106
When responding to a fight between an alleged reckless driver and a local homeowner, Harmon and Diaz find that a stray dog has been hit by a vehicle. Animal control is unable to provide assistance so Lasman euthanizes it on the scene. After Diaz tells Harmon that his brother had been attacked, she changes her mind and stops to see Smokey, who says the only way to call off the hit is if they arrest members of a rival gang. East Barrio begins having internal conflicts because its leaders believe that Smokey gave up maniac. The two then answer a call where three teenagers overdosed at a party. They provide medical assistance until the paramedics arrive. Afterwards, Harmon and Diaz head to the homeless encampment once more where she clarifies that her sister, Jen, got addicted to narcotics while recovering from her injury, which is what actually caused her to lose her job. Jen lives there where she is known as Sheriff. Harmon wants to arrest Jen, but Diaz urges Harmon to take her to a safe house instead, to which Harmon agrees. Harmon then proposes that they move Diaz's brother to a different prison facility where East Barrio won't be able to get to him.
7	"War Machine"	Brenna Malloy	Bryan Gracia & John Conley	January 9, 2025	ONCL107
Harmon shows Delgado's parents Maria's plaque on the fallen officer wall at the station. Diaz's mother visits him there where she inquires about his brother. When things get tense, Harmon breaks it up; Diaz's mother then thanks Harmon for saving her son. Harmon and Diaz get called to a robbery at a dispensary belonging to Smokey where two people were shot and a safe was broken into. While collecting evidence with Barlowe, they receive a secondary robbery call with suspects meeting similar descriptions at a nearby residence. There, they find Smokey's daughter Leona injured, and a missing wall safe. Lasman decides that the best way to handle East Barrio is to issue a tactical alert and arrest everyone in the area with known affiliations and warrants, but Harmon disagrees. Diaz visits Leona in the hospital and talks her into giving up the name and address of one of her attackers. Believing that Smokey also knows this information, Harmon and Diaz rush there only to find the two occupants shot. Harmon and Lasman argue over the successfulness of the tactical alert. Koyama then tells Harmon that he has a way to arrest Smokey and asks if she wants to help.
8	"How the West Was Won"	Brenna Malloy	Tim Walsh & Elliot Wolf	January 9, 2025	ONCL108
Diaz mentions that his 60-day review is soon and Koyama says that his commander has approved Harmon's transfer to his unit, but that it still needs to be approved by her superior. After convincing an associate of Smokey's to cooperate, Koyama's team, along with Harmon and Diaz, stakeout a truck stop where Smokey is expected to receive a drug shipment. However, instead of Smokey, Leona accepts the drugs. A gunfight then erupts between her and other members of Smokey's crew. Diaz chases Leona, but finds Smokey instead. Leona catches Diaz off guard and shoots him, but Koyama kills her before she can kill Diaz. Harmon then finds Smokey and arrests him. Diaz recovers from his injuries and Harmon discovers that her transfer was denied. Believing that Lasman was responsible, Harmon confronts him, but he says it wasn't him. In Diaz's review, Harmon suggests that his probation period be reset. Harmon asks Bishop if she is the one who denied her transfer and she admits to doing so, saying it's because of the way Harmon located Maniac. Harmon then requests that she be allowed to continue training Diaz to which Bishop reluctantly agrees. Diaz gives Harmon his Get Out of Jail Free card before the two head out on patrol.

== Production ==
=== Development ===
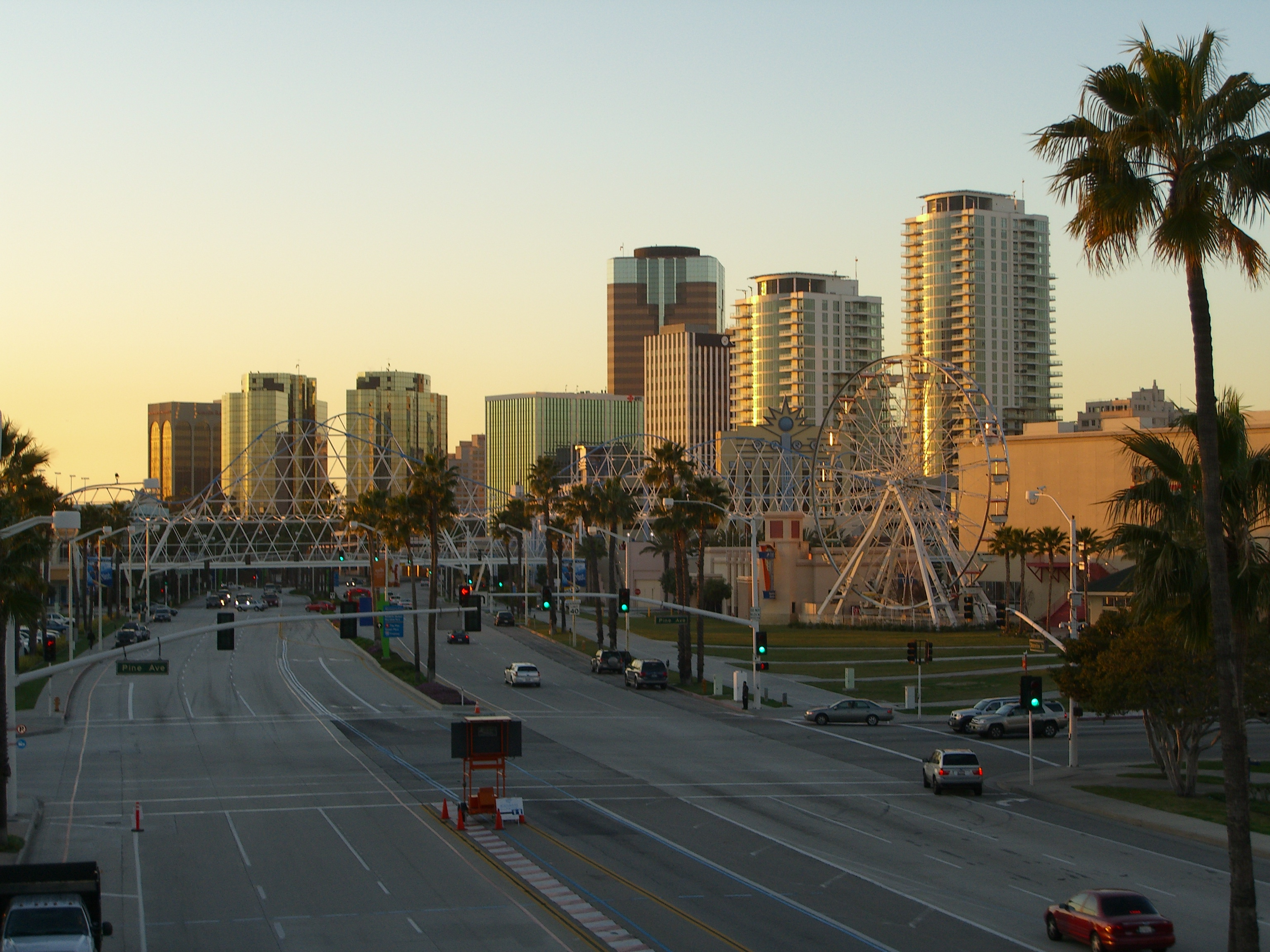
The series was filmed and set in the city of Long Beach, California.

In May 2021, IMDb TV ordered On Call, a half-hour police procedural to be executive produced by Dick Wolf. It is the first scripted streaming television series and the first half-hour drama from Wolf, who has a history of working with broadcast networks. His production company, Wolf Entertainment, as well as Universal Television, ATTN:, and Amazon MGM Studios were attached to produce the show. It was reported that Ben Watkins would be the series' showrunner and would executive produce it alongside Wolf's son, Elliot Wolf. Derek Haas, Peter Jankowski, and Arthur W. Forney, with Matthew Segal and Taye Shuayb for ATTN: took on additional executive producer roles. IMDb TV was later rebranded as Amazon Freevee. The eight-episode series was co-created by Tim Walsh, who also joined as an executive producer, and Elliot Wolf.

Eriq La Salle rounded out the executive production staff and directed episodes 1, 2, 5, and 6. The remaining episodes were directed by Brenna Malloy. Walsh, La Salle, Haas, Jankowski, and Malloy previously worked with Dick Wolf on various series in his Chicago, FBI, and Law & Order franchises. Writing on the program was temporarily halted in May 2023 during the 2023 Writers Guild of America strike; at this time, it was revealed that it would actually release on Amazon Prime Video instead.

Filming for On Call took place on-location in the Southern California city of Long Beach, where the series is set, and was underway by May 2023. Recording mixed traditional television cameras with experimental found footage formats utilizing bodycams, dashcams, and cell phone cameras. All eight episodes were released on January 9, 2025. After the first season had concluded, Walsh stated that he was "hopeful" that there would be a second season and that "some threads" had been left open.

=== Casting ===
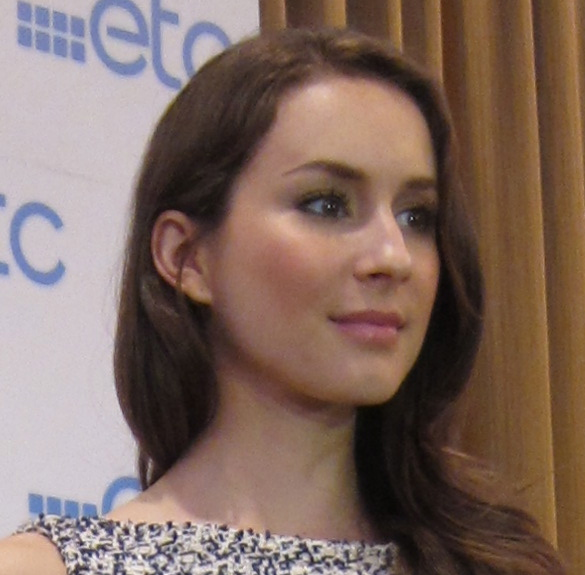
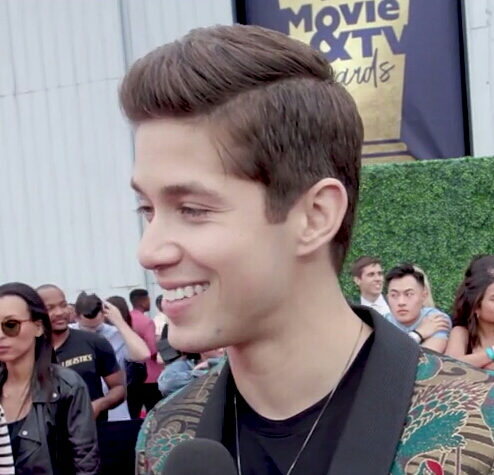
Troian Bellisario (left) and Brandon Larracuente (right) headlined the series as Officers Traci harmon and Alex Diaz.

Troian Bellisario and Brandon Larracuente lead the series cast portraying Traci Harmon and Alex Diaz. Harmon is a seasoned training officer who is tasked with training Diaz, a new rookie. La Salle also joined the series cast with Lori Loughlin and Rich Ting. They play the higher-ranking officer roles of Sergeant Lasman, Lieutenant Bishop, and Sergeant Koyama, respectively. It is Loughlin's first major television role following her involvement in the Varsity Blues scandal. The role of Bishop was originally offered to Michael Beach who accepted it, but was ultimately unable to take part in the series due to scheduling conflicts. Other actors were considered for the role before La Salle decided to take it up himself as he wanted the opportunity to act in, produce, and direct the same series.

When a trailer for the series was released, it was revealed that Monica Raymund, who starred in Chicago Fire, would also appear in the premiere episode as Officer Maria Delgado. Delgado was killed off less than three minutes into the episode. Walsh explained this decision, stating that the series "needed someone to fill that role, to cast that shadow" and that "we wanted people to believe it was a show about her, and it's not exactly what happens." Additional roles were filled by Mac Brandt, Lobo Sebastian, Robert Bailey Jr., Annabella Didion, and Ian Down.

=== Soundtrack ===
On Call (Prime Video Original Series Soundtrack)

Soundtrack album by Atli Örvarsson
- Released: January 10, 2025
- Length: 29:42
- Label: Lakeshore Records

Atli Örvarsson chronology
Sun Divider (2024)	On Call (Prime Video Original Series Soundtrack) (2025)	The Darkness (Original Soundtrack) (2025)

Singles from On Call (Prime Video Original Series Soundtrack)
- 1. "Long Beach" Released: January 9, 2025

The series score was composed by Atli Örvarsson, who also worked on the Chicago and FBI franchises. A digital soundtrack album titled On Call (Prime Video Original Series Soundtrack) was released by Lakeshore Records on January 10, 2025, and was accompanied by a single first released on YouTube one day prior.

All music is composed by Atli Örvarsson.

On Call (Prime Video Original Series Soundtrack
No.	Title	Length
1.	"Long Beach"	3:22
2.	"I Want Help"	2:36
3.	"Hatchet"	1:27
4.	"Zombieland"	2:19
5.	"First Night"	1:39
6.	"Motel Stakeout"	2:06
7.	"Harmon's Sister"	1:57
8.	"Immolation"	1:28
9.	"For Delgado"	1:54
10.	"Diaz & Harmon"	2:14
11.	"Tactical Alert"	1:42
12.	"Diaz's Brother"	1:16
13.	"Barrio Ambush"	2:01
14.	"Harmon & Smokey"	1:24
15.	"Get Out of Jail Free"	2:11
Total length:		29:42

=== Cancellation ===
On May 9, 2025, Prime Video canceled the series after one season. Amazon was initially interested in ordering two additional seasons of the program, but with a reduced licensing fee, under a cost-plus contract model that Wolf Entertainment and Universal Television could not afford. The series was pitched to other streaming platforms, with negotiations underway with two of them, one being Peacock, which houses other series of Dick Wolf's and is owned by NBCUniversal. Additionally, the possibility of turning On Call into a media franchise, with at least one spin-off series, was included in these discussions as well. If a new platform for the show is found, Amazon would allow producers to regain control of the first season's streaming rights.

No agreement was reached with either of these streamers, although conversations have continued elsewhere with chances for a renewal considered to be low. In June, Larracuente was cast in a main role on the fourteenth season of Chicago Fire.

== Reception ==
=== Viewing figures ===
Within four days of the show's premiere date, it had been seen by 620,000 households, 26% of which were predominately Black households. A week after of the series' release, On Call ranked as the most-watched show on Prime Video in the United States. According to Nielsen ratings the series was the tenth most-watched original program across all streaming services for the week of January 20–26, 2025, with 297 million minutes viewed.

=== Critical response ===
Professional ratings
Aggregate scores
Source	Rating
Metacritic	48/100
Rotten Tomatoes	55%
Review scores
Source	Rating
But Why Tho?	7.5/10
Collider	6/10
Chicago Tribune	1.5/4 stars
Comic Book Resources	9/10
Looper	3/10
Ready Steady Cut	3.5/5 stars

On the review aggregator website Rotten Tomatoes, 55% of 20 critics' reviews are positive. The website's consensus reads: "On Call is an undemanding patrol thanks to its half-hour format, but the shorter runtime is about the only new novelty it brings to the cop drama genre." Metacritic, which uses a weighted average, assigned the film a score of 48 out of 100, based on 8 critics, indicating "mixed or average" reviews. The series received primarily mixed reviews.

Writing a review for Comic Book Resources, Brittany Frederick opined that the program established itself by avoiding the overused elements typical for the genre and that the shorter runtime allowed it to avoid filler scenes. Jonathan Wilson from Ready Steady Cut described the series as "a new kind of cop drama, blending serialized drama with a procedural, and while not all of it works, the result is mostly lean, mean entertainment."

Isabella Soares with Collider praised the chemistry between Belisario and Larraccuente's characters, writing that it "sets the tone for the show's more humane approach to the procedural." But Why Though critic Kate Sánchez penned a more mixed review and said the program "lacks catharsis but attempts complexity". She explained that the focus on patrol officers rather than detectives allows the audience to see more danger, but criticized the copaganda and portrayal of gangs. Sánchez concluded her review by adding that it "doesn't reinvent the genre but it does thrive in it", believing that a longer episode count would work better for the series.

Looper's Ryder Alistair condemned On Call's format, saying that it was "awkwardly divided" between its overarching story and case of the week, stating "the continuing storyline ensures it can't be enjoyed as an episodic cop show like its broadcast counterparts, and is too generic and reliant on cliché to hold interest by itself." Writing for the Chicago Tribune, Nina Metz wrote that the series was "so intent on selling audiences on the idea that police are unfairly maligned and in danger every moment, of every day, that it forgets to tell a coherent or even fitfully entertaining story." Metz later criticized the practicality of the show, comparing the number of shootouts it had to those at the O.K. Corral.
