= Burn Notice season 3 =

Burn Notice
- Season 3
- DVD cover
- No. of episodes: 16

Release
- Original network: USA Network
- Original release: June 4, 2009 – March 4, 2010

Season chronology
- ← Previous; Season 2 Next → Season 4

The third season of the American television spy drama Burn Notice premiered on June 4, 2009, on the cable television channel USA Network. Season three consists of sixteen episodes, split between a nine-episode summer season and a seven-episode winter season.

== Season overview ==
Season 3 picks up with Westen, having lost the protection of "Management," now under surveillance by Miami Detective Paxson (Moon Bloodgood), who has been tasked with monitoring his activities. Michael can secure the arrest of a major Miami criminal Paxson has long been targeting, and he threatens to reveal the true circumstances of the arrest if Paxson does not stop following him. Paxson agrees to the deal. Michael is soon contacted by a man named Tom Strickler (Ben Shenkman), a "smooth-talking, gregarious freelance spy broker", who offers to unburn Michael in exchange for his help with a potentially lethal job. It is clear to Michael that Strickler has major, if shadowy, connections, but appears to be the first person he has met capable of getting him his old job back. At first, it seems to work, and Michael can confirm, through interactions with undercover CIA agent Diego Garza (Otto Sanchez), that movement is being made on his burn notice. In the midseason finale, however, Michael is forced to kill Strickler to save Fiona's life. The action has unforeseen consequences, including the murder of Agent Garza.

Following Strickler's death, Westen is contacted by an associate named Mason Gilroy (Chris Vance), who is responsible for the murder of Garza. Gilroy informs Michael that he wants Michael's help on an extremely lucrative operation. Believing Gilroy to be planning something dangerous, Michael plays along to uncover the plot to eventually foil it. After performing several errands for Gilroy, Michael learns that the job involves a maximum security prisoner being rendered from Chile to Poland. Gilroy's job is to divert the plane to Miami, but he is double-crossed and blown up. Before dying, he informs Michael that the man behind the operation is named Simon (Garret Dillahunt), a man who committed the crimes used to burn Michael. In the Season 3 finale, Michael solicits help from Management to stop Simon. Michael successfully captures Simon but is arrested himself, while Management states that Michael has a "big future." Michael is taken to a mysterious room, where he sits as the season ends.

Actor Michael Weston appeared in one episode as a schizophrenic MIT graduate who needs Michael to protect him from what he thinks are aliens selling the names of undercover spies. Also, Sharon Gless was nominated for the Primetime Emmy Award for Outstanding Supporting Actress in a Drama Series for her work in this season. Gless was also reunited with her former Cagney & Lacey co-star, Tyne Daly, for the episode "A Dark Road".

== Cast ==
Jeffrey Donovan returned for the third season as series protagonist Michael Westen. Gabrielle Anwar also returned as Fiona Glenanne, while Bruce Campbell reprised his role as Sam Axe. Sharon Gless returned to play Madeline Westen.

The third season featured a host of guest stars and recurring guests. Paul Tei returned as Michael's favorite money-launderer, Barry Burkowski. Seth Peterson returned as Michael's brother, Nate Westen. The character of Detective Michelle Paxson was introduced, portrayed by Moon Bloodgood. Another handler for Michael, Tom Strickler, was portrayed in a variety of episodes by Ben Shenkman. Otto Sanchez portrayed Michael's CIA contact Diego Garza. A self-proclaimed "freelance psychopath," Mason Gilroy, was played by Chris Vance. John Mahoney returned as the mysterious man known only as Management. Several villains from previous seasons returned, including Tim Matheson as "Dead" Larry Sizemore and Jay Karnes as the vengeful Tyler Brennen. A former villain, Sugar (Arturo Fernandez), returned needing Michael's help. Marc Macaulay and Brandon Morris returned as Agents Harris and Lane in a single episode. Garret Dillahunt was introduced as Simon Escher, the man who actually committed the crimes Michael was framed for. Various actors made guest appearances during the season, including Carlos Bernard, Jude Ciccolella, Clayne Crawford, Tyne Daly, Callie Thorne, and Danny Trejo.

== Episodes ==
No. overall	No. in season	Title	Directed by	Written by	Original release date	Prod. code	US viewers (millions)
29	1	"Friends and Family"	Tim Matheson	Matt Nix	June 4, 2009	BN301	5.99
Without the government's "protection," Michael pops up on the radar of the police and foreign intelligence and tries to run, but can't avoid being arrested. Still burned, and now under investigation, Michael bides his time until an old friend from his Special Forces days liberates him for a favor: help extradite a Venezuelan criminal who is stealing land from farmers in that country for himself and his friends. In order to kidnap the man, Michael and his team have to first get past the guy's right hand man and secure a direct meeting with him. When Michael's friend reveals himself as a double agent, working for the criminal's associates to eliminate him before he can be tried and framing Michael for the killing, Michael has to escape and defeat his friend so the Venezuelan farmers can put him on trial and receive justice. Along the way, Michael's friends worry that, with his emancipation, he'll go back to work for the CIA, which is exactly what he's planning.
30	2	"Question and Answer"	John T. Kretchmer	Alfredo Barrios, Jr.	June 11, 2009	BN302	5.24
A woman comes to Fiona and Michael to ask them to help her find her son, who is in the custody of her estranged husband, but it turns out the boy has been kidnapped by a thief as leverage for a shipment of jewels. To track down where he's being held, Michael and the team utilize reverse interrogation to get the kidnappers to point them to their hideout, as well as successfully managing to convince the lead guy that his own crew is planning to cross him. Meanwhile, Michael is forced to outwit a Miami Police detective named Paxson, who, in the course of investigating him, has discovered his stash of illegal explosives. Also, Madeline tries to connect with Michael as his mother, and complains to Fi about how difficult a relationship with Michael can be.
31	3	"End Run"	Dennie Gordon	Craig O'Neill	June 18, 2009	BN303	5.78
Nate returns to Miami to expand his limo company, but is effectively taken hostage by Michael's old foe, Brennen, so he can use Michael to gather the pieces to a high-tech government weapon. With his brother's life on the line, Michael and his team race to find out everything they need to know about Brennen to stop him and keep both Westen brothers alive. Simultaneously, with Paxson looking for someone in Michael's life to flip on him, he contacts Barry in a scheme to connect him with someone with enough clout to get her off his back, a plan which only serves to anger Paxson so much that she promises to play just as dirty.
32	4	"Fearless Leader"	John T. Kretchmer	Michael Horowitz	June 25, 2009	BN304	5.35
Paxson makes Michael’s life interesting by putting a police tail on him around the clock, so he decides to finally get her to back off by helping her with a difficult case she’s working, trying to bring in an experienced, arrogant criminal who rips off drug dealers and has a nasty habit of causing the deaths of anyone within range. The team befriends one of his associates, a wannabe gangster with a good heart, and works with him to get close to and finally bring down the main man. Paxson then decides to let Michael off, cautioning him not to cross the line again, so he decides his best way forward is, much to Fi’s disappointment, get back into the CIA. Meanwhile, an IRS agent with a grudge against Sam tries to audit him for revenge, but Sam finally realizes what went wrong in their past and they end up reconnecting.
33	5	"Signals and Codes"	Jeremiah S. Chechik	Jason Tracey	July 9, 2009	BN305	5.51
A mathematician with a history of paranoia and schizophrenia (Guest Star: Michael Weston) asks Michael to look into suspicious killings being done under the radar through the defense firm he works at, which is actually selling out spies and diplomats. After finding the employee responsible, the team initially tries to get her caught with an illegal copy of an encryption program, but when she goes after their client they have no choice other than to use him to force her hand. In the meantime, Michael works overtime to track down a spy stationed in Miami in hopes he can help him get his old job back, but, much as he respects Michael, the man, Agent Garza, can only guarantee that the government will review his file. With Michael determined to pursue this dream, Fi very reluctantly agrees to support him.
34	6	"The Hunter"	Bryan Spicer	Story by : Ryan Johnson; Teleplay by : Lisa Joy	July 16, 2009	BN306	6.66
An “agent to the spies” named Strickler approaches Michael in an attempt to entice him into becoming his newest acquisition, and, while Michael refuses to be a mercenary, Strickler alerts him to a potential threat from someone he wronged during his time in Ukraine. Instead, Michael turns to a local big-time cargo thief with Ukrainian connections, but, while he and his contact are taken captive by the Ukrainians and forced to outrun them, Sam and Fi decide to call on Strickler to help out. While they track down a lead through him about the Ukrainians’ location in the Everglades, allowing them to save the guys, Michael and the hijacker lead their men on a chase through the swamp until they can finally gain the upper hand on the man who was after him, all the while coming to an understanding as friends. As for Strickler, he continues to press a resolute Michael, reminding him that, with the burn still in effect, he doesn’t have a lot of options for using his skills.
35	7	"Shot in the Dark"	Ernest Dickerson	Ben Watkins	July 23, 2009	BN307	6.80
Michael and the team work with a determined young boy, whose abusive step-father is the public face for his brother’s covert smuggling operation and is trying to take his kids away from their mother. Despite their efforts to run him out of town by convincing him someone is trying to kill him, he won’t leave and their attempt to force his hand by staging their own deaths fails when his brother steps in to solve the problem, so they make it look like the man is crazy to get him out of the way of his family. Meanwhile, with Strickler dogging him and promising to help with the burn notice in exchange for his services, Michael turns to Garza to see if Strickler has the connections, and, when Garza’s reaction essentially confirms it, Michael decides to make the deal.
36	8	"Friends Like These"	Félix Alcalá	Rashad Raisani	July 30, 2009	BN308	6.63
Barry cashes in all the favors Michael owes him to track down his ledger, which has been stolen by a clever thief intent on making Barry pay one way or another. They’re able to sort through her complicated scheme, tracking her to the exchange location so they can get the ledger back, but she manages to escape. For his first mission for Strickler, Michael enlists his mother’s help tracking a man who can lead him to a deal involving weapons stolen from a local intelligence safe house, but, while Michael’s work results in movement on his burn notice, Fiona walks out when he refuses to stop working with Strickler.
37	9	"Long Way Back"	Jeff Freilich	Craig O'Neill	August 6, 2009	BN309	7.59
Fi’s move home to Ireland, as well as Maddie's own moving plan, is halted when a blood-thirsty former compatriot from her past in Ireland comes to Miami to settle an old score, so Michael steps into his old Irish cover to help. With the added assistance of her brother, Sean, Michael and the team work to convince the man that he can hand Fiona over to him as a trap, but plans change when the man’s true motives are revealed and Strickler interferes to help him. Despite the upcoming review, Michael kills him to get him out of the way and moves into high gear to save Fi and put the Irishmen away for good. At the same time, despite rooting against Michael’s reinstatement, Garza calls in distress about Michael’s association with Strickler and how his own life is now in danger because of it, so, when he ends up dead in an apparent suicide, Michael again begins to wonder what is going on.
38	10	"A Dark Road"	John T. Kretchmer	Matt Nix	January 21, 2010	BN310	5.35
With Fi recovering, Michael takes a job for her helping a woman, whose husband recently died in a dangerous insurance scam, get the money she deserves and keep her family safe. After Maddie befriends the by-the-book records clerk (Guest Star: Tyne Daly), Michael tracks down the guy to convince him and his father that he’s got a scam of his own they can pull off; however, when the son feels threatened and takes things into his own hands, Michael and the team have no choice but to use Maddie’s new friend to get the evidence they need for the police while also helping her keep her job. Meanwhile, Sam assists Michael in tracking down Garza’s killer, and, despite some perilous tests along the way, Michael finally secures a meeting with the man: Mason Gilroy.
39	11	"Friendly Fire"	Terry Miller	Alfredo Barrios, Jr.	January 28, 2010	BN311	5.30
An old SEAL teammate of Sam’s, with whom he has a tense relationship, asks him to help bring in a murderous fugitive with a history of preying on kids. In order to flush him out of the lawless barrio where he’s hiding, Michael – posing as something close to the devil incarnate – and the team work to convince the morally oriented local gang leader to help them. When trouble arrives in the form of a rival gang leader (Guest Star: Danny Trejo), the danger increases but it turns out to be a blessing in disguise, as taking him down will be mutually beneficial for both the locals and Michael’s client, who patches things up with Sam. Along the way, Michael is able to quiet Gilroy’s initial doubts that he is a good fit for the mission Gilroy’s planning, even as Fi encourages Michael to try finding a life outside of work.
40	12	"Noble Causes"	Michael Zinberg	Ben Watkins	February 4, 2010	BN312	4.25
Michael’s old drug-dealer neighbor, Sugar, shows up to ask him to get his mentally challenged, yet good-natured, cousin out from under the thumb of a group of relentless thieves, who intend to use him as a fall guy for a planned heist on a fully stocked armored truck. Working off the limited information they can gather, the team is able to prevent the heist and save Sugar’s cousin. Meanwhile, when Gilroy tries to force him to work with another man to steal a file from the Chilean embassy, Michael botches the mission to ensure he’ll be unhindered in thwarting Gilroy’s master plan, even though the failure leads him to threaten to kill Michael if anything else goes wrong along the way.
41	13	"Enemies Closer"	Kevin Bray	Jason Tracey	February 11, 2010	BN313	4.66
While making use of Sam’s military connections to find a private flight on Gilroy’s orders, a flight whose contents Gilroy won't divulge, tensions within Michael's team boil over when his former mentor Larry rears his ugly head after having stolen $2 million from a cartel in Michael’s name. With Larry being his usual selfish, psychopathic self, Michael’s efforts to clear his good name and get the cartel off his back are endangered at every turn, and no more so than when it seems only Larry is on his side. Once Michael clears his head, and mends fences with Sam and Fi, they finally manage to take the cartel out of the picture and force Larry to go on the run again. Meanwhile, Nate stops by without warning on his honeymoon with his wife, and the shock of the controversial choice is only worsened when the newlyweds try to convince Maddie to move near them in Vegas for her own safety.
42	14	"Partners in Crime"	Dirk Craft	Michael Horowitz	February 18, 2010	BN314	4.12
Michael helps an eager Sam look into funds that are being stolen from within a high-end fashion house, but the case takes a serious turn when the company’s female founder is murdered, so Michael and the team work to prove that her co-founder is the true culprit and mastermind of the plot. Initially, they try to use the innocent scapegoat as bait to catch him and his accomplice, but the trap fails so Michael turns the two guilty parties apart just in time for the police. Also, in order to find out what is on the flight Gilroy is after, Michael enlists Fi as part of his plan to talk with a local Polish bureaucrat and persuade him to take the file out of secure storage, leading to the discovery that the plane is carrying an incredibly dangerous prisoner.
43	15	"Good Intentions"	Dennie Gordon	Rashad Raisani	February 25, 2010	BN315	4.50
A hustler friend of Fi’s drags her in to a dangerous professional kidnapping ring, whose paranoid boss is only looking for restitution from a computer chip company responsible for the deaths of hundreds of children, including his own daughter. In order to keep him from taking the life of an innocent scientist he’s kidnapped, Michael and Sam provide outside assistance to influence him to lead them to the hostage, who decides to blow the whistle on his company. At the same time, as Gilroy sets the stage for the arrival of the mysterious prisoner, Michael -- who was personally selected by the man for the mission – goes so far as to see if his old FBI detail, Harris and Lane, will help him stop Gilroy, but he is left with no choice except to help Gilroy so he won’t go on a killing rampage by himself. In the end, though, Michael narrowly avoids being blown up along with Gilroy after the criminal, named Simon, double-crosses him and escapes.
44	16	"Devil You Know"	Matt Nix	Matt Nix	March 4, 2010	BN316	4.32
In order to keep Simon from blowing up a local hotel, Michael has to work with him to secure a meeting with Management so Simon can get his life back, while also dodging the police and FBI manhunt for the both of them every step of the way. With Maddie being pressed by the authorities either to give them Michael or face prison herself, Sam and Fi gather all the information they can to find the bomb and disable it; for his part, Michael has to work harder than ever to outwit and defeat Simon, who warns him about getting more involved with the people who burned him. Maddie is released by the FBI after Michael is taken into custody, but is stunned to learn that he has been transferred to an unknown location under heavy guard.
