= Chaunteé Schuler =

American singer and actress (born 1982)

- Born: October 15, 1982 (age 43)
- Occupations: Actress, Singer
- Years active: 2002-present

Chaunteé Schuler (born October 15, 1982) is an American singer and actress.

== Early life ==
Schuler was born in Alaska. She was raised in Spotsylvania, Virginia. She started singing at a young age in her church choir. After graduating from high school, she attended the University of Richmond.

== Career ==
Schuler is a prolific stage actress, starring in productions such as The Lion King, Everyday Rapture, Applause, The Producers, Party Come Here, Dreamgirls, Crumbs from the Table of Joy, and Xanadu.

Her most notable television role was Bonnie McKechnie in the CBS TV series As the World Turns.

In 2022, Schuler joined the cast of the Prime series, Cross, playing the role of Maria Cross, the deceased wife of Alex Cross.

=== Awards ===
In 2006 Schuler was nominated for the Barrymore Award for Outstanding Leading Actress in a Musical for her work in Dreamgirls.
