= Haven (TV series) =

American-Canadian television series (2010–2015)

- Genre: Supernatural drama; Fantasy; Mystery; Horror; Thriller
- Based on: The Colorado Kid by Stephen King
- Developed by: Sam Ernst; Jim Dunn
- Starring: Emily Rose; Lucas Bryant; Nicholas Campbell; Eric Balfour
- Theme music composer: Andre Fratto; Leah Siegel
- Composer: Shawn Pierce
- Countries of origin: United States; Canada
- Original language: English
- No. of seasons: 5
- No. of episodes: 78 (list of episodes)

Production
- Executive producers: Sam Ernst; Jim Dunn; David MacLeod; John Morayniss; Noreen Halpern; Laszlo Barna; Gabrielle Stanton; Matt McGuiness; Scott Shepherd; Shawn Piller; Lloyd Segan
- Production locations: South Shore, Nova Scotia
- Cinematography: Éric Cayla; Barry Donlevy
- Camera setup: Single-camera
- Running time: 41–43 minutes
- Production companies: Big Motion Pictures Productions; Entertainment One Television; Piller/Segan/Shepherd; Universal Networks International; Canwest Global (season 1); Shaw Media (seasons 2–5)

Original release
- Network: Syfy (United States); Showcase (Canada)
- Release: July 9, 2010 – December 17, 2015

Haven is a supernatural drama television series developed by Jim Dunn and Sam Ernst, loosely based on the Stephen King novel The Colorado Kid (2005). The series, which deals with strange events in a fictional town in Maine named Haven, was filmed on the South Shore of Nova Scotia, and is an American-Canadian co-production. It stars Emily Rose, Lucas Bryant, Nicholas Campbell and Eric Balfour, whose characters struggle to help townspeople with supernatural afflictions and protect the town from the effects of those afflictions.

The series premiered on July 9, 2010, on Syfy, and concluded on December 17, 2015. In August 2015, Syfy canceled the series after five seasons.

== Premise ==
When FBI Special Agent Audrey Parker (Emily Rose) is dispatched to the small town of Haven, Maine, on a routine case, she finds herself becoming increasingly involved in the return of "The Troubles", a plague of supernatural afflictions that have occurred in the town at least twice before. With an openness to the possibility of the paranormal, she also finds a more personal link in Haven that may lead her to the mother she has never known.

Over time, Parker, who eventually quits the FBI to join the Haven Police Department, begins to realize that her arrival in Haven may have been pre-arranged and that her name and even her memories may not be her own. As the series progresses, she learns more about the mysteries of both Haven and her true identity.

She and her partner, police detective Nathan Wuornos (Lucas Bryant), find themselves frequently facing problems caused by both the effects of the Troubles, as well as the activities of town folk who take more drastic measures against those who are Troubled.

== Cast and characters ==
=== Main ===
- Emily Rose as Audrey Parker / Mara (seasons 4–5)
- Lucas Bryant as Nathan Wuornos
- Nicholas Campbell as Garland Wuornos (season 1; guest seasons 2–3)
- Eric Balfour as Duke Crocker

=== Recurring ===
- Mary-Colin Chisholm as Eleanor Carr (season 1)
- Richard Donat as Vince Teagues
- John Dunsworth as Dave Teagues
- Anne Caillon as Jess Minion (season 1)
- Michelle Monteith as Julia Carr (season 1)
- Stephen McHattie as Edmund "Ed" Driscoll (season 2; guest season 1)
- Kathleen Munroe as FBI Agent Audrey Parker (season 2; cast season 1)
- Jason Priestley as Chris Brody (season 2; guest season 5)
- Vinessa Antoine as Evidence "Evi" Ryan (season 2)
- Adam "Edge" Copeland as Dwight Hendrickson (seasons 2–5)
- Maurice Dean Wint as Agent Byron Howard (season 3; guest seasons 1–2 & 5)
- Bree Williamson as Claire Callahan (season 3)
- Kate Kelton as Jordan McKee (seasons 3–4)
- Steve Lund as James Cogan (season 3; cast "Over My Head"; guest season 5)
- Laura Vandervoort (guest season 3), Tim Post (cast season 3), Deborah Tennant (cast season 3), Dorian Missick (season 3) and Bree Williamson (guest season 3) as Arla Cogan / The Bolt Gun Killer
- Colin Ferguson as William (seasons 4–5)
- Emma Lahana as Jennifer Mason (season 4)
- Christian Camargo as Wade Crocker (season 4)
- Jayne Eastwood as Gloria Verrano (seasons 4–5)
- Robert Maillet as Heavy (seasons 4–5; cast "Survivors")
- Kris Lemche as Seth Byrne (season 5; guest season 4)
- Laura Mennell as Charlotte Cross (season 5)
- Paul Braunstein as Mitchell (season 5)
- Christian as McHugh (season 5)
- William Shatner as Croatoan (season 5)
- Rossif Sutherland as Henry / The Sandman (season 5)
- Tamara Duarte as Hailie Colton (season 5)

== Development and production ==
Haven was originally developed for ABC Television in 2007 by writers Sam Ernst and Jim Dunn, with production company Piller Segan.

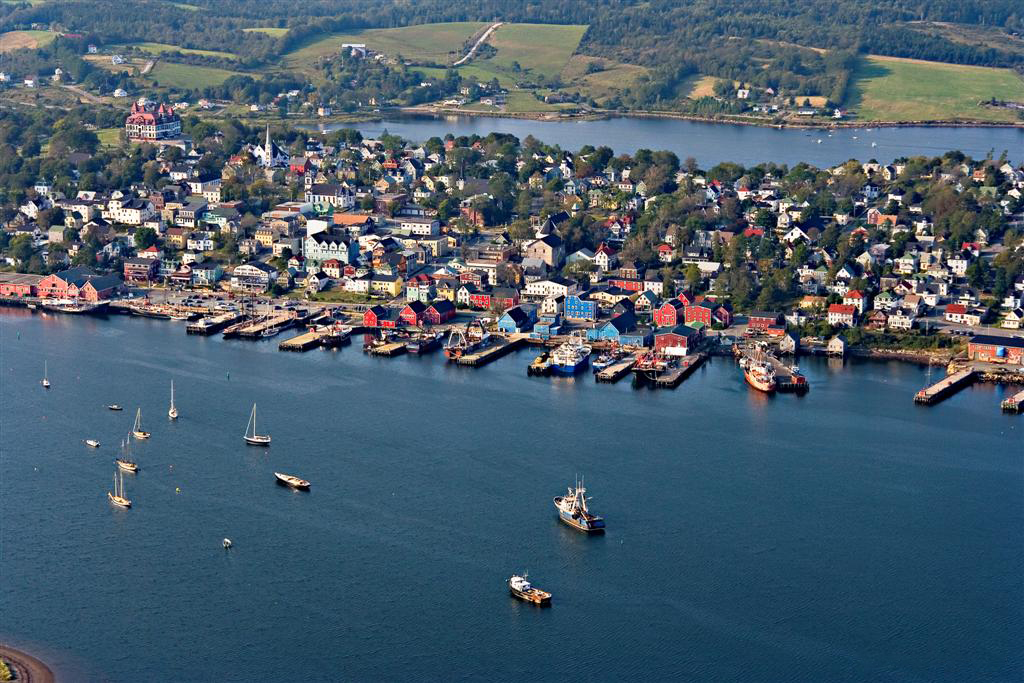
View of Lunenburg. The shoreline can be seen in various Haven episodes.

In September 2009, E1 Entertainment announced it was working with Stephen King to develop a television series based on his novel The Colorado Kid (2005). The entertainment company ordered the concept straight to series, with thirteen episodes planned. In November, Syfy announced it had acquired the series.

Sam Ernst and Jim Dunn wrote the pilot episode. According to Ernst, the original idea had no supernatural involvement, which prompted Stephen King to ask "Where's the supernatural element?" after he read their notes. In February 2010, Emily Rose was cast in the lead role of Audrey Parker. Eric Balfour and Lucas Bryant came on board in late March. Canadian broadcaster Canwest Global Communications acquired rights to the series in March as well.

In April 2010, Adam Kane signed on to direct the pilot. Production began April 20 in Halifax, Nova Scotia and surrounding areas. Filming occurred primarily in Chester, Nova Scotia (including using the local arena as a studio) and throughout the South Shore of the province, including Lunenburg, Halifax, and Mahone Bay.

The promo of the series premiere features the song Short Change Hero by The Heavy.

The series premiere, "Welcome to Haven", aired on Syfy in the U.S. on July 9, 2010, and on Showcase in Canada on July 12. The show became available to other international markets in October 2010.

== Episodes ==
Season	Episodes		Originally released	
Season	Episodes		First released	Last released
1	13		July 9, 2010	October 8, 2010
2	13		July 15, 2011	December 6, 2011
3	13		September 21, 2012	January 17, 2013
4	13		September 13, 2013	December 13, 2013
5	26	13	September 11, 2014	December 5, 2014
5	26	13	October 8, 2015	December 17, 2015

The one-hour drama premiered on July 9, 2010, on Syfy. The series was the first property to be produced for Syfy Pay channels around the globe, excluding Canada and Scandinavia. On October 12, 2011, it was renewed for a third 13-episode season, which began airing on September 21, 2012. On November 9, 2012, it was renewed for a fourth 13-episode season. On January 28, 2014, the show was renewed for a split 26-episode fifth season. The first half aired in 2014 with the second half airing in 2015.

== Reception ==
Haven premiered to mixed reviews, the series as a whole having an average score of 63% fresh on Rotten Tomatoes, with Seasons 4 and 5 rating 80%. Metacritic only aggregated a rating for the first season.

== References to other works ==
Allusions to the written works of author Stephen King are made in the series regularly; the setting for the series is derived from King's novella The Colorado Kid (2005), although the name of the town is changed. On Syfy.com's Haven website, many of these references are explained for each episode. For example, Derry and Haven are both fictional towns in Maine previously used in the author's stories. One of the main characters receives a copy of a novel written by a character from King's novel, Misery (1987), while another character has just been released from Shawshank Prison. In some cases the plot of an episode revolves around an idea from King's works: a character who has precognitive, psychometric visions after touching people or things; or plants that start killing people.

It is noted on the Syfy site that "It is a particular favorite Stephen King book for the Haven writers and producers". For example, in "A Tale of Two Audreys", a little boy in a yellow rain slicker is seen outside the church chasing a newspaper boat that he has set in the stream in the gutter. He chases until it falls down into a storm drain on Witcham Street. He then sticks his right arm down into the drain and screams. The scene can be found in the opening chapter of the 1986 book. Also derived from It, the episode "Fear and Loathing" revolves around a troubled person who (unwillingly) takes the form of a person's worst fear, and in one instance appears as a clown, a visual allusion to Pennywise of the film version of It (1990). The "Troubles" also seem to coincide with the arrival of the stranger, in this case Audrey, every 27 years. This is the same amount of time between appearances of the creature in It.

"Croatoan" coincidentally also appears carved into a tree in the 3 part Stephen King mini series "Storm of the Century."

== Home media ==
=== DVD ===
Name	Set details	DVD release dates			Special Features
Name	Set details	Region 1	Region 2	Region 4	Special Features
The Complete 1st Season	Discs: 4; Episodes: 13	June 14, 2011	January 30, 2012	June 1, 2011	Twelve audio commentaries with cast and crew; "Welcome to Haven" featurette; "Visual FX of Haven" featurette; "Mythology of Haven" featurette; Behind-the-scenes video blogs; Additional cast interviews; Season two sneak peek: "Inside the Writers' Room"
The Complete 2nd Season	Discs: 4; Episodes: 13	September 4, 2012	October 1, 2012	May 16, 2012	Ten audio commentaries with cast and crew; "Silent Night" Christmas episode; Six making-of featurettes; Five behind-the-scenes featurettes; Interview with Adam Copeland; Haven panel at New York Comic Con
The Complete 3rd Season	Discs: 4; Episodes: 13	September 3, 2013	September 30, 2013	May 15, 2013	"The Haunting Truth about Haven: A Documentary"; Six audio commentaries with the writers; "Escape to Haven" webisode series; Haven panel at New York Comic Con; Deleted/alternative scenes; Interviews with the cast and guest stars; Behind-the-scenes footage; Blooper reel; Haven: After the Storm comic (Region 1 only)
The Complete 4th Season	Discs: 4; Episodes: 13	August 26, 2014	September 8, 2014	November 12, 2014	Thirteen "Inside Haven" featurettes; "Darkside Seekers" webisode series; Six audio commentaries with the writers; Panel highlights from San Diego Comic Con, Nerd HQ and New York Comic Con; Three interviews with the cast; Pancakes: The Morning After deleted scene; Behind-the-scenes footage; Blooper reel; Haven: In the Beginning comic (Region 1 only)
Season 5, Volume 1	Discs: 4; Episodes: 13	September 8, 2015	October 12, 2015	November 18, 2015	Thirteen "Inside Haven" featurettes; Haven Origins: Witches Are Born; Haven Origins: Native Breaks Free; Audio commentaries
The Final Season	Discs: 4; Episodes: 13	April 19, 2016	April 4, 2016	May 18, 2016	Thirteen "Inside Haven" Featurettes; Thirteen Audio Commentary Tracks; Interviews with Eric Balfour, Lucas Bryant, William Shatner, Adam Copeland & Producer Shawn Piller; Mythology Refresher; Haven Revisited: Livestream Segments with the Cast & Crew; Haven Archives: Entries from the Crocker Diaries; Haven Origins: Lovers Conquered All; Haven Origins: Trust Kills Fear
The Complete Series	Discs: 24; Episodes: 78	April 19, 2016	TBA	TBA	TBA

=== Blu-ray ===
In Region A, Entertainment One released the first season on Blu-ray on June 14, 2011, and the second season on September 4, 2012. In Region B, the first season was released on September 14, 2011.

== Broadcast ==
Haven has been sold for broadcast in several countries worldwide, including Australia, Canada, New Zealand, the United Kingdom, and the United States.

== Syndication ==
Chiller acquired the rights to air Haven in June 2013. It first premiered on Sunday, July 14, 2013, at 8pm ET, and aired four episodes every Sunday thereafter until the series was discontinued prior to the network's closure.. Genesis International distributes the syndication version to several local markets in the US.
