= Alex Cross (character) =

- Alex Cross character
- Morgan Freeman as Alex Cross
- First appearance: Along Came A Spider
- Created by: James Patterson
- Portrayed by: Morgan Freeman (films), (films); Tyler Perry (films); Aldis Hodge (TV series)

In-universe information
- Nicknames: 'Dr' Cross (due to his forensic psychologist method); Sugar (given by his best friend and partner John Sampson)
- Species: Human
- Gender: Male
- Occupation: Police detective
- Spouse: Maria (deceased)
- Children: 3
- Religion: Christian
- Nationality: American

Alex Cross also known as Dr Alex Cross or Detective Cross is a fictional character and protagonist in a series of novels by American author James Patterson. Cross is a skilled forensic psychologist and former FBI agent who works as a detective in Washington, D.C., solving complex and often dangerous criminal cases. The character was introduced in the 1993 novel Along Came a Spider, has appeared in over 30 novels as of 2024, and is one of Patterson's most popular characters.

Cross has been portrayed in film and on television by various actors, including Morgan Freeman, Tyler Perry, and Aldis Hodge.

== Fictional character biography ==
Both of Cross's parents died while he was a child, his mother to lung cancer and his father to alcoholism. He was sent to live with his grandmother, Nana Mama, in Washington, D.C. when he was nine years old. In adulthood he would go on to obtain a Ph.D. in Psychology from Johns Hopkins University and work for the Washington, D.C. Police Department and the Federal Bureau of Investigation (FBI). Cross is also a former boxer, which has aided him when forced to fight with violent criminals.

Cross has had three major romantic relationships throughout the course of the Alex Cross series and its adaptations. Prior to the series' start Cross met and married a woman named Maria, who was assassinated prior to the events of Along Came a Spider (1993) and with whom he had two children. A second major love interest, Christine Johnson, was introduced in Cat and Mouse (1997), and the two had a child together before the relationship ended due to the dangers and stress of Cross's job. A new love interest, Bree Stone, is introduced in Double Cross (2007). Other people in Cross's life include his troubled adopted daughter Ava, who was murdered by a nemesis in Alex Cross, Run (2013). Cross has also held a long friendship with his partner and best friend John Sampson.

As the series progresses Cross meets and deals with several cases, including Kyle "The Mastermind" Craig, who serves as a primary antagonist for the series. Craig, along with other antagonists and the general stress and danger of his job, causes Cross to constantly struggle for a balance between his role as a detective and his responsibilities as a father, friend, and romantic partner.

== Appearances in series ==
Alex Cross was introduced as a character in Patterson's 1993 novel Along Came a Spider, which served as the first entry in the Alex Cross series. Cross would continue to appear in every entry in the main series, including two novellas, Cross Kill (2016) and Detective Cross (2017).

A spinoff series focusing on Ali Cross, Cross's child with Christine Johnson, began in 2019; Cross makes several appearances in this series.

== In other media ==
=== Film adaptation ===
Alex Cross has been adapted into feature films, with prominent actors portraying him:

- Morgan Freeman starred as Alex Cross in Kiss the Girls (1997) and Along Came a Spider (2001).
- Tyler Perry took on the role in Alex Cross (2012), which served as a reboot but received mixed reviews.

=== Television adaptation ===
In 2022, Amazon Prime announced a series adaptation titled Cross, with Aldis Hodge playing Alex Cross. The series explores his early career and personal life, bringing renewed attention to the character. Cross premiered on November 14, 2024, All eight episodes of the first season were released on Amazon Prime Video.

== Reception ==
In a 2004 journal article scholar Philippa Gates noted that in the novels Cross is presented as a sexualized man capable of romantic and sexual relationships, which she felt made him a more powerful and positive representation of male masculinity. Gates noted that these elements were largely removed in the screen adaptations, a move she thinks might be a move to make the character "less threatening for a mainstream audience, but also seems to be inextricably tied to Morgan Freeman's star persona."

=== Authorship ===
The authorship of Alex Cross has been the focus of some discussion, as Cross is a black character written by a white author. Scholar Robert Fikes praised the development of the Alex Cross character in his 2002 article focusing on the history of white authors writing novels that focused on black lives. Journalist Earni Young was more critical, opining that the character did not display any characteristics or elements that would mark Cross as a black man other than his skin color and that while Cross has faced some elements of racism, the character's race has never been the focus of any of the series entries.
