= Sam Ernst =

American television writer and producer

- Occupations: Television writer, television producer
- Years active: 2004–present
- Known for: Cross, The Dead Zone, Haven, Crisis, Hand of God, Daredevil, Carnival Row

Sam Ernst is an American television writer and producer best known for working on shows such as Cross, Daredevil, Carnival Row, Hand of God, Haven, and The Dead Zone. He frequently collaborates with his writing partner Jim Dunn. In 2010, he and Dunn co-created the Syfy supernatural drama series Haven, based upon the Stephen King short story "The Colorado Kid". Since April 2005, he and Dunn have co-run a podcast website called "Sam and Jim Go to Hollywood", where they chronicle their experiences in Hollywood.

== Career ==
Ernst co-wrote a film entitled "Myron's Movie" in 2004. Directed by Maggie Soboil, the film premiered at the 2004 Fargo Film Festival and won the festival's Best Narrative Feature award.

=== The Dead Zone episodes ===
- "Re-Entry" (6.03)
- "Outcome" (6.08)
