= Kiss the Girls (1997 film) =

1997 psychological thriller film by Gary Fleder

- Theatrical release poster
- Directed by: Gary Fleder
- Screenplay by: David Klass
- Based on: Kiss the Girls by James Patterson
- Produced by: David Brown; Joe Wizan
- Starring: Morgan Freeman; Ashley Judd; Cary Elwes; Tony Goldwyn; Jay O. Sanders
- Cinematography: Aaron Schneider
- Edited by: Armen Minasian; Harvey Rosenstock; William Steinkamp
- Music by: Mark Isham
- Production company: Rysher Entertainment
- Distributed by: Paramount Pictures
- Release date: October 3, 1997
- Running time: 115 minutes
- Country: United States
- Language: English
- Budget: $27 million
- Box office: $100 million

Kiss the Girls (stylized in all lowercase) is a 1997 American neo-noir psychological thriller film directed by Gary Fleder, and starring Morgan Freeman, Ashley Judd, and Cary Elwes. The screenplay by David Klass is based on James Patterson's best-selling 1995 novel of the same name. A sequel titled Along Came a Spider was released in 2001.

== Plot ==
Washington D.C. Detective and forensic psychologist Dr Alex Cross is devastated to learn that his niece, Naomi, a college student in Durham, North Carolina, has been missing for four days, and he travels to Durham to investigate.

Upon arrival, Cross learns that multiple young women are missing. He collaborates with Detectives Nick Ruskin and Davey Sikes, as well as FBI agents. They visit a crime scene in the woods where the body of one of the missing women has been found, murdered and tied to a tree.

Meanwhile, Dr. Kate McTiernan, a doctor and kickboxer, is abducted from her home by a masked man who calls himself Casanova. She wakes up in a stone-walled room and is told by Casanova that he admires her talents and she won't suffer if she complies with his rules. Kate, however, is determined to escape. She discovers that other women are held captive with her.

Kate overpowers Casanova during one of his visits and escapes into the woods, jumping off a cliff into a river. She is found and taken to a hospital, where she provides vital information about her captivity and describes Casanova.

Cross discovers that a plastic surgeon in California, Dr. William Rudolph, had ordered a large quantity of Sistol, a benzodiazepine drug, which was used to sedate the captives. Travelling to California, Cross and Kate join forces with Sampson, Cross' partner, and Henry, an LAPD Detective, to begin surveilling Rudolph.

After staking out Rudolph's home, they follow him to a cabin in the woods, then to a nightclub. Kate, upon seeing Rudolph caress a woman's cheek, recognizes his touch and, believing he is Casanova, alerts Cross. Rudolph takes the woman from the nightclub to his cabin, where a chase ensues when the group hears her screaming, during which Rudolph escapes after shooting one of Sampson’s men and injuring Cross.

At Rudolph's home, the police uncover the identity of a second killer, named by the press as the Gentleman Caller. This killer is working in conjunction to and competition with Casanova. The two operate bicoastally, abducting women within days of one another and sharing images of their captives for the other to see. The police also discover a hidden freezer that contains mutilated body parts of his victims, distinguishing the Gentleman Caller's MO from Casanova's.

Back in North Carolina, with the help of Naomi's boyfriend who is familiar with the area, Cross locates the hideout where the women are being held. Concurrently, Rudolph has travelled to North Carolina and has broken into Casanova's lair. He enrages Casanova when he tries to undermine his control of the captive women. Casanova shoots at Rudolph but intentionally misses. Upon hearing Cross enter the hideout, Casanova tells Rudolph to flee. In a climactic confrontation, Cross and the police rescue the captives, including Naomi. Rudolph is killed by Cross in a chase, but Casanova escapes.

The FBI raid the hideout and locate Casanova's fingerprints. Finally feeling safe, Kate invites Cross to her home for dinner before he returns to D.C. Before Cross is due to arrive, Detective Ruskin arrives at Kate's home to check on her. She welcomes him inside and, whilst her back is turned, he cuts her phone line.

In the meantime, Cross recognizes a similarity between Casanova's handwriting and Ruskin's signature. Realizing Ruskin is Casanova, Cross rushes to save Kate. Ruskin, now revealed as Casanova, attempts to rape and kill Kate. A fight ensues, breaking a gas line in the kitchen. Realising this, Ruskin takes out a lighter, threatening to ignite it. Cross arrives, and uses a milk carton as a muzzle for his gun. By doing this, the gunshot does not ignite the building, and Ruskin is fatally struck in the head. Cross and Kate reunite, embracing one another.

== Cast ==
- Morgan Freeman as Alex Cross
- Ashley Judd as Kate McTiernan
- Cary Elwes as Nick Ruskin
- Tony Goldwyn as William Rudolph
- Jay O. Sanders as Kyle Craig
- Bill Nunn as Sampson
- Brian Cox as Chief Hatfield
- Alex McArthur as Sikes
- Richard T. Jones as Seth Samuel
- Jeremy Piven as Henry Castillo
- William Converse-Roberts as Dr. Wick Sachs
- Gina Ravera as Naomi Cross
- Roma Maffia as Dr. Ruocco
- Tatyana Ali as Janell Cross
- Mena Suvari as Coty Pierce

== Production ==
=== Filming ===
Principal photography began on April 16, 1996. The film was shot two weeks on location in North Carolina on the streets of Durham, in nearby county parks, and outside a Chapel Hill, North Carolina residence. The police station was constructed in a downtown Durham warehouse. The majority of filming occurred in the Los Angeles area, with locations including the Disney Ranch, The Athenaeum at the California Institute of Technology in Pasadena, California, a house in the Adams historic district of Los Angeles, and on the campus of the University of Southern California in University Park. Designed by American production designer Nelson Coates, the majority of the sets, including the tunnels and underground chambers, were constructed in sound stages on the Paramount Studios lot. Filming was completed on July 10.

According to Ashley Judd, a more violent ending was imposed by the CEO of Paramount, Sherry Lansing. In 2026, Judd expressed mixed feelings about her role in the film, explaining, "Today when people say, ‘Kiss the Girls is my favorite movie,’ I’m like, ‘Let’s talk about that,’ because male sexual violence and male torture of women is not entertainment, and that’s what that movie is about."

== Release ==
The film premiered at the Deauville Film Festival in September 1997 before opening on 2,271 screens in the US the following month. It earned $13,215,167 in its opening weekend and a total of $60,527,873 in the US, ranking #28 in domestic revenue for the year. The film earned $39.5 million overseas, for a worldwide gross of $100 million.

The film was not shown in some theaters in central Virginia at the time of release, due to the unsolved murders of three teenage girls in the area. This decision was out of respect for the families and surrounding communities. The murders were eventually solved and attributed to Richard Evonitz.

== Reception ==
=== Critical reception ===
On the review aggregator website Rotten Tomatoes, 39% of 36 critics' reviews are positive, with an average rating of 5.6/10. The website's consensus reads: "Detective Alex Cross makes his inauspicious cinematic debut in Kiss the Girls, a clunky thriller that offers few surprises." Metacritic, which uses a weighted average, assigned the film a score of 46 out of 100, based on 17 critics, indicating "mixed or average" reviews.

Stephen Holden of The New York Times said the film "is cut from the same cloth as The Silence of the Lambs, but the piece of material it uses has the uneven shape and dangling threads of a discarded remnant.... [It] begins promisingly, then loses its direction as the demand for accelerated action overtakes narrative logic". Holden writes of Morgan Freeman that he "projects a kindness, patience and canny intelligence that cut against the movie's fast pace and pumped-up shock effects. His performance is so measured it makes you want to believe in the movie much more than its gimmicky jerry-rigged [sic] plot ever permits".

In the Chicago Sun-Times, Roger Ebert gave the film three and a half out of four stars and said, "David Klass, the screenwriter, gives Freeman and Judd more specific dialogue than is usual in thrillers; they sound as if they might actually be talking with each other and not simply advancing plot points.... [They] are so good, you almost wish they'd decided not to make a thriller at all - had simply found a way to construct a drama exploring their personalities".

Rita Kempley of The Washington Post called the film "a tense, scary, perversely creepy thriller" and added that "David Klass ... blessedly deletes the graphic descriptions of torture and rape included in the novel. Unfortunately, he also neglects to include any explanation of Casanova's behavior. Otherwise Kiss the Girls does what it's supposed to do. A solid second film from director Gary Fleder, it's sure to set pulses racing and spines tingling". In the same newspaper, Desson Thomson felt that "the movie ... operates on the crime-movie equivalent of automatic pilot. It takes off, flies and lands without much creative intervention".

In the San Francisco Chronicle, Peter Stack thought "the story ... goes on too long. It has too many confusing plot twists and keeps losing energy. Blame it on Hollywood excess, or director Gary Fleder's uncertain hand. A cut of 15 minutes would have helped". He was more impressed by the film's stars, calling Morgan Freeman "compelling" and "a hero of extraordinary power that comes almost entirely from his unemotional, calculating calm", and stating that Ashley Judd "gives the sometimes plodding drama a dose of intense vitality. This young actress is getting awfully good at turning potentially gelatinous characters into substantive people who spark viewer interest".

=== Awards and nominations ===
Judd was nominated for Best Supporting Actress in a Motion Picture Drama at the 1998 Satellite Awards.

== Sequel and reboot ==
Four years after Kiss the Girls, a film adaptation of Along Came a Spider was released in 2001. Morgan Freeman reprised his role. Later, the franchise was rebooted with a 2012 adaptation of the novel Cross, titled Alex Cross, starring Tyler Perry in the title role.
