= Jim Dunn (writer) =

American television writer and producer

- Occupations: Television writer, television producer
- Years active: 2004–present
- Known for: The Dead Zone, Haven

Jim Dunn is a television writer and producer best known for working on shows such as The Dead Zone, Crisis and Hand of God. He frequently collaborates with his writing partner Sam Ernst. In 2010, he and Ernst co-created the Syfy supernatural drama series Haven, based upon the Stephen King short story "The Colorado Kid". Haven ran for 6 broadcast cycles in over 80 countries, completing 78 episodes. Although Dunn and Ernst had moved on to other shows after Season 3, they returned to write a time-travel episode exploring Haven's past for the show's final season.

== Career ==
Dunn co-wrote a film entitled "Myron's Movie" in 2004. Directed by Maggie Soboil, the film premiered at the 2004 Fargo Film Festival and won the festival's Best Narrative Feature award.

=== The Dead Zone episodes ===
- "Re-Entry" (6.03)
- "Outcome" (6.08)
