= Ben Watkins (producer) =

American television writer and producer

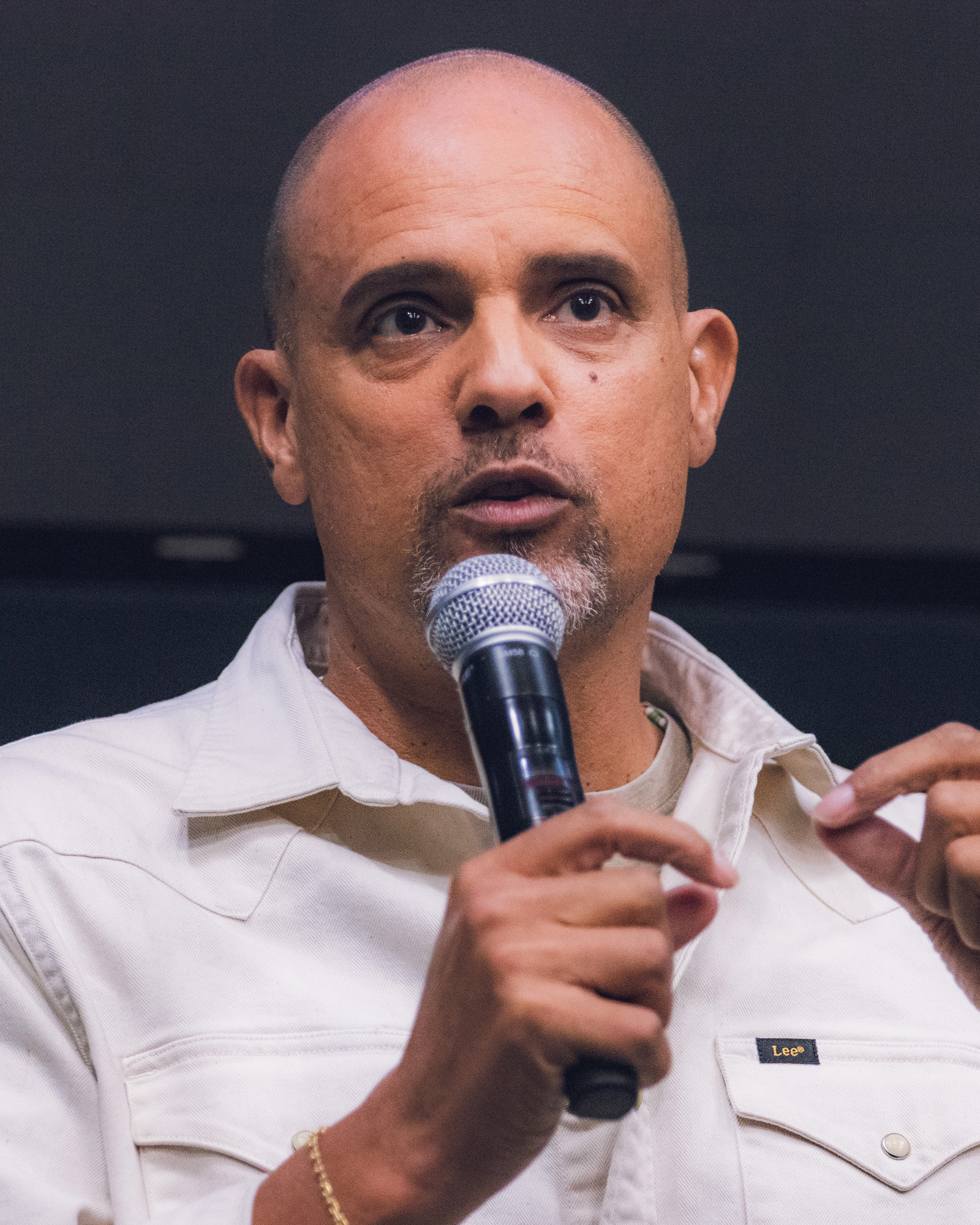
- Watkins in 2026
- Born: March 19, 1971 (age 55); Berkeley, California, U.S.
- Occupations: Writer; director; executive producer; showrunner; actor
- Years active: 1996–present
- Known for: Burn Notice; Hand of God; Cross
- Spouse: Kandi Ali
- Children: 4

Ben Watkins (born March 19, 1971) is an American television writer, director, producer, and showrunner. He is best known for creating the Amazon Prime Video series Hand of God and serving as showrunner and executive producer of the Prime Video series Cross, based on the Alex Cross novels by James Patterson.

== Early life and education ==
Watkins was born in Berkeley, California. During his childhood, his family moved frequently - by his estimate, 14 times before he graduated high school - with experiences ranging from living in gated communities to being temporarily homeless and sleeping in a car. He was married and had started a family before completing college.

== Career ==
=== Acting and early writing ===
Watkins began his entertainment career as an actor. He appeared in television series including Moesha and City Guys, and played Dr. Wesley Carter on the CBS soap opera The Young and the Restless from 2002 to 2004. He also made guest appearances on CSI: Miami and later had a recurring role on Burn Notice as Ricky Watkins.

His transition to writing began with the short film Quest to Ref, which he wrote, co-directed, and starred in. The film was an official selection at the Sundance Film Festival and won the American Black Film Festival. Universal Pictures subsequently acquired the project for adaptation into a feature screenplay. Watkins joined the writing staff of the USA Network series Burn Notice as a staff writer during its first season. Over the show's seven-season run, he became an executive producer. He wrote fifteen episodes of the series.

Watkins created the Amazon Prime Video original series Hand of God, which starred Ron Perlman and ran for two seasons from 2014 to 2017. The series explored themes of religion, zealotry, and morality, which Watkins had long been interested in exploring. He served as an executive producer on the Apple TV+ series Truth Be Told starring Octavia Spencer, and as a consulting producer on the Hulu series Wu-Tang: An American Saga. Watkins and his wife, Kandi Ali, co-founded the production company Blue Monday Productions. Through the company, Watkins has developed projects for FX, HBO, NBC, and Hulu.

In 2021, Watkins was announced as showrunner and executive producer for On Call, a half-hour police drama from Dick Wolf for IMDb TV (later rebranded as Amazon Freevee). The series was premiered on January 9, 2025, exclusively on Amazon Prime Video.

Watkins currently serves as creator, writer, showrunner, and executive producer of the Prime Video series Cross, based on James Patterson's Alex Cross novels. The series stars Aldis Hodge in the title role and premiered in 2024. The series was renewed for a third season.

== Filmography ==
Key
| † | Denotes television productions that have not yet been released |

=== Acting credits ===
| Year | Title | Role | Notes |
|---|---|---|---|
| 1999 | Moesha | Jason | 1 episode |
| 2000 | City Guys | Adam | 1 episode |
| 2002–04 | The Young and the Restless | Dr. Wesley Carter | 13 episodes |
| 2004 | CSI: Miami | Audiologist | 1 episode |
| 2005 | Issues | Royce | Feature film |
| 2006 | Stripped Down | Lee | Feature film |
| 2008–11 | Burn Notice | Ricky Watkins | 2 episodes |
| 2026–present | Cross | Roy | 8 episodes |

=== Other credits ===
| Year | Title | Creator | Showrunner | Writer | Director | Executive Producer | Notes |
|---|---|---|---|---|---|---|---|
| 2007–13 | Burn Notice | No | No | Yes | No | Yes | |
| 2014–17 | Hand of God | Yes | Yes | Yes | Yes | Yes | |
| 2019 | Wu-Tang: An American Saga | No | No | No | No | Consulting | |
| 2019–20 | Truth Be Told | No | No | No | No | Yes | |
| 2024–present | Cross | Yes | Yes | Yes | No | Yes | |
| 2025 | On Call | No | Yes | No | No | Yes | |
| 2026 | The Greatest | Yes | Yes | Yes | Yes | Yes | |

== Personal life ==
Watkins resides in El Segundo, California, with his wife, Kandi Ali, and their four sons. He is a founding member of the Sweat Equity Alliance, a community activist organization focused on civil rights, public education, and homelessness. He is also active with the Writers Guild of America and participates in its Showrunner Training Program.
