= Burn Notice season 5 =

Burn Notice
- Season 5
- DVD cover
- No. of episodes: 18

Release
- Original network: USA Network
- Original release: June 23 – December 15, 2011

Season chronology
- ← Previous; Season 4 Next → Season 6

The fifth season of the American television spy drama Burn Notice premiered on June 23, 2011 on the cable television channel USA Network. The season concluded after its eighteenth episode on December 15, 2011.

== Season overview ==
Six months after the arrest of Vaughn and the retrieval of the NOC list, Michael has been working with the CIA to capture, imprison, or execute all of the people that worked for the organization that burned him. With only one high-ranking operative remaining, Michael, his boss Raines (Dylan Baker), and partner Max (Grant Show) attempt to extract the final spy, but he commits suicide rather than face the CIA. Having to return to Miami before being reinstated, Michael struggles with civilian life, constantly checking and re-checking inconsistencies in the documents on Management.

In the fourth episode of the season "No Good Deed", Michael and Max work to steal a piece of stolen information and bring it back to the CIA. When Michael shows up to the de-brief, he discovers Max bleeding out on the floor, shot by what is likely the murder weapon beside him. Hearing gunfire, he picks up the weapon and attempts to chase down the murderer, who escapes unidentified. Michael covers his tracks, and the murderer's, before escaping. Michael's suspicions about being framed for the murder are confirmed when Sam discovers a newly opened box of ammunition that matches the murder weapon in the car Michael used to drive to the building. Destroying the weapon, Michael and his team run their investigation parallel to Agent Dani Pearce (Lauren Stamile), the lead investigator for the CIA.

Tracking them through the imposter used to pose as Michael, they find that an extremely complex bomb was prepared to kill him; the intricacies of the bomb lead them to a Romanian war criminal who created the bomb for an old friend, Tavian Korzha (Andrew Howard). Tracking Korzha to his warehouse they catch a glimpse of him but he escapes. Using data from Korzha's computers they locate the source of his funds, which also allows for them to attempt an ambush, which he anticipates, and kidnaps Sam, demanding a meeting with Michael. While he insists on only that time and place, Jesse's NSA and FBI connections lock down the island for the meet, forcing him to stay. However, Michael, reentering his loft after a CIA extraction mission, encounters Agent Pearce, who has found proof of a Charger leaving the scene of Max's murder, enough proof to convince her that Michael was the killer, arresting him at gunpoint. Sam and Jesse intercept the CIA convoy, convincing Pearce to let Michael meet Korzha. While wearing a wire, Michael gets Korzha to confess to the frame and murder, but Korzha kills himself to avoid further interrogation. Michael is exonerated and debriefed.

Upon his return, Michael is kidnapped by Larry Sizemore (Tim Matheson), who has also kidnapped DIA psychiatrist Anson Fullerton (Jere Burns). Using Anson as leverage, Larry forces Michael to help him break into a British consulate and steal information. While Michael's team foil Larry's plot and presumably kill him, the explosives used chain-react with a series of others, inadvertently making Fiona responsible for two other deaths. Her confession was recorded by Fullerton, who is revealed as the final member of the organization that burned Michael. He explains that the organization was started by him and Management and their intentions were initially simple: get burned spies to carry out questionable missions that would never get through the red tape at intelligence agencies. Fullerton uses the information on Fiona as leverage, forcing Michael to work under the organization once again.

The reason for Anson's intervention is to assign Michael the task of traveling to Puerto Rico to locate a hacker who had developed software that will help Anson erase any known information the CIA may have on him and his organization. While Michael does delete the information after obtaining the necessary virus, he tries to find some leverage of his own. The team manages to track Anson on a military-encrypted radio. This leads the team to Benny, Madeline's boyfriend who is also Anson's spy. However, Anson is one step ahead and blows up Benny before they can get any useful information. Anson then forces Jesse and Fiona to go to the Cayman Islands and retrieve his money. Through Agent Harris, Sam then manages to get a meeting with the FBI deputy director, planning to take down Anson. But the team needs to use Anson to help Beatriz, which provides Anson the opportunity to stop Sam. He gets the meeting called off and Sam is investigated as a possible Russian agent by including him in the report that stopped the Russian spy from murdering Beatriz. This is shortly after Anson reveals to Michael that he had met, and acted as a psychiatrist to Michael's father, and due to his father's suspicions, caused the heart attack that killed Frank Westen.

Through files obtained through a Washington, D.C. law firm, Michael discovers a connection to his one-time "handler" Vaughn Anderson, formerly with Anson's organization (and arrested in the Season 4 finale). Through Agent Pearce, Michael arranges a meeting with Vaughn in a prison camp, where he discovers the truth behind Fullerton's actions. Michael had hoped that Anson might simply flee the country after wiping out his connections to the organization and retrieving his frozen money. But Vaughn assures Michael: using the infrastructures already in place, Anson is not retiring, but is re-building the organization from the ground up, along with help from the unwilling Michael Westen.

When the CIA allows Michael to run an operation with an authorized team, Anson takes the opportunity to force Michael to burn the team and Pearce to provide a front line of operatives for his new organization. While Fiona is not willing to accept her freedom over theirs, Michael is adamant that the situation can be redeemed without compromising Fiona. When Anson's mole on the team is uncovered by Michael, he quickly improvises a plan to extract their target and instructs Jesse to remove the framing evidence. When Michael returns home from the mission, however, he discovers Fiona has left to turn herself in and remove Anson's leverage over Michael. Michael arrives at the Federal Building just as Fiona is being arrested.

== Cast ==
=== Main ===
- Jeffrey Donovan as Michael Westen
- Gabrielle Anwar as Fiona Glenanne
- Coby Bell as Jesse Porter
- Bruce Campbell as Sam Axe
- Sharon Gless as Madeline Westen

=== Recurring ===
- Lauren Stamile as Agent Dani Pearce
- Jere Burns as Anson Fullerton
- Grant Show as Max
- Andrew Howard as Tavian Korzah
- Arturo Fernandez as Sugar
- Charlie Weber as Jacob Starky
- Steve Zurk as Benny
- Seth Peterson as Nate Westen
- Dylan Baker as Raines
- Todd Stashwick as Carmelo Dante
- Paul Tei as Barry Burkowski
- Brendan O'Mally as Gabriel Manaro
- David Fickas as Jack Dixon
- Tim Matheson as "Dead" Larry Sizemore
- Ben Watkins as Ricky Watkins
- Ilza Rosario as Beatriz
- Marc Macaulay as Agent Harris
- Robert Wisdom as Vaughn Anderson
- Kristanna Loken as Rebecca Lang

Grant Show appeared as Max, an operative with the CIA, for three episodes. Lauren Stamile appeared in multiple episodes as Dani Pearce, another CIA operative that Michael works with after the death of Max. Matt Lauria portrayed Ethan, a discharged soldier involved with the CIA, in one episode. While the role carried the possibility of recurring, he did not return. Dylan Baker returned as Raines, the previously unnamed man seen in the fourth season finale. Tim Matheson and Todd Stashwick returned as "Dead" Larry Sizemore and Carmelo, while Paul Tei returned as Barry Burkowski, Michael's money-launderer. Seth Peterson appeared as Michael's brother, Nate Westen. Jere Burns appeared in various episodes as Anson Fullerton, the man at the top of the organization that burned Michael. Robert Wisdom returned as Vaughn for one episode, while Ilza Rosario, who portrayed Beatriz in Burn Notice: The Fall of Sam Axe, made one appearance in the series. Other guest stars included The Big Show, Dean Cain, Charisma Carpenter, David Dayan Fisher, James Frain, Kristanna Loken, J. C. MacKenzie, Eric Roberts, and Gavin Rossdale.

== Episodes ==
No. overall	No. in season	Title	Directed by	Written by	Original release date	Prod. code	US viewers (millions)
63	1	"Company Man"	Stephen Surjik	Matt Nix	June 23, 2011	BN501	5.17
Using the NOC list, Michael works with the CIA and his new handler Max as a civilian asset to go through the names one by one until the entire international organization is out of business. After a brief catch-up session with friends and family in Miami, Michael is called back to DC to finish off his task by finding the last member of the organization, a key operations guy holed up at a secure compound in Venezuela. Along with backup from his own team, Michael and the CIA attempt to trap the guy, but he figures out what's going on and is able to escape, only to commit suicide rather than reveal his secrets. Afterwards, a disappointed Michael is reminded by his mother that closure doesn't always come and is prompted to get back to normal life.
64	2	"Bloodlines"	Colin Bucksey	Alfredo Barrios, Jr.	June 30, 2011	BN502	4.67
A client of Jesse's company asks Michael to rescue her cousin from the local branch of a Yakuza human trafficking ring, and the team goes after the man in charge looking for answers. The gangster is injured when they chase him down, so they bring in Maddie as his nurse while Michael tries to find out where the girl is but he won't talk. Instead, Michael has his mother stage a breakout with the gangster so they can tail him to where the girls are being held, freeing them before they're killed and putting an end to the operation. At the same time, on an official mission for the CIA, Michael is assigned to babysit a top British nuclear scientist at a local conference, to keep him from any adultery that might endanger his status as a CIA asset. With Fi as a distraction, they actually manage to push him back into faithfulness to his wife, which prompts Michael to commit to his relationship with Fi by asking her to move in.
65	3	"Mind Games"	Scott Peters	Michael Horowitz	July 7, 2011	BN503	4.88
After moving back to Miami with his family for his own sake, as well as his son's, Nate asks Michael to help a friend's widow, who is being harassed by an aggressive loan shark to repay her husband's debt. The team decides to get him out of her life by making the guy's boss question his loyalty, but they accidentally reveal the man as a true undercover investigator. To fix things, and put the bad guys away for good, Michael helps him escape and set the boss up to be arrested. Meanwhile, Michael's friends and family begin to grow concerned about him adjusting to normal life, especially when he can't seem to get over inconsistencies in the files of the people who burned him, but Nate, from his own experience as an addict, suggests he trust his instincts and see it through.
66	4	"No Good Deed"	Jeremiah S. Chechik	Rashad Raisani & Ben Watkins	July 14, 2011	BN504	5.39
Michael's team works to clear the name of Barry's straight-arrow brother (Guest Star: John Ross Bowie), a bank manager, after a thief (Guest Star: Big Show) uses his ID to steal an encrypted server with thousands of member records. The real mastermind turns out to be an experienced, ruthless hacker who thwarts the team's every effort and threatens them even after they convince her that the mobster who hired her to decrypt the drive is planning to betray her, so Fi blows up her computer to salvage the situation. Later, after completing a mission to infiltrate a protected room and retrieve tech secrets stolen from another nation by French operatives, Michael heads in for debriefing only to find Max dying after being shot by an unknown assassin, with Michael framed for the murder. He barely escapes, covering the killer's tracks in the process, so the team must race to find the gunman before the CIA comes for Michael.
67	5	"Square One"	Marc Roskin	Ryan Johnson & Peter Lalayanis	July 21, 2011	BN505	5.39
Michael is connected with a recently returned sniper who is convinced his sister is in an abusive relationship, but they find out that her injuries are due to some trouble between her boyfriend and his boss, a medical insurance scammer. Working with the girl's impatient brother, the team tries to gain access to the criminal's network so they can put him behind bars; after preventing an attempt on the man's life, they use that to isolate him from his crew and get him caught tying up loose ends. With the investigation into Max's death heating up, and the lead agent, Pearce -- who also doubles as his replacement -- on the scent, Michael joins in while conducting his own search for the killer with his team. Using his position as a disgraced agent, he accesses phone records for a lead and learns that whoever killed Max hired someone who looked and acted just like Michael.
68	6	"Enemy of My Enemy"	Jonathan Frakes	Jason Tracey	July 28, 2011	BN506	5.00
Pearce is pressed by her superiors, who have a past with Sam (see: Burn Notice: The Fall of Sam Axe ), to immediately track down a stolen Predator drone in the middle of the investigation and keep it out of the hands of a Serbian ex-military syndicate. To protect an undercover asset, Michael offers his team's service to recover the drone off-the-books and puts Sam in position to influence an old foe, a dangerous drug dealer named Carmelo (Todd Stashwick; from Episode 1.12 "Loose Ends"), to go after the Serbians. Things get serious, though, when Carmelo finds out he's being duped, so Michael pops up to offer a deal: Michael and Sam get out alive, while Carmelo gets to be the hero with the authorities, even if they don't like it. In the meantime, despite frustration at Michael putting Sam in danger, the team uses facial recognition to find the Michael clone who framed him and tail him to a gun buy, a bad omen for whatever's ahead.
69	7	"Besieged"	Stephen Surjik	Craig O'Neill	August 4, 2011	BN507	5.21
Sam's girlfriend brings his attention to a divorced woman who is having custody issues over her asthmatic son with her ex-husband, an already-troubled man involved with zealous anti-government militia. When he takes refuge in the militia's secure compound, Michael and Sam make a Trojan horse play to get inside and reclaim the boy, but the militia are listening in on Michael's cell phone conversations, which the team promptly uses to draw them all out and create the opening needed to get the boy to safety before the authorities arrive. Elsewhere, the team figures out that Michael's doppelgänger is just an untrained civilian who is now being targeted by whoever hired him, so they work with him to make contact with the person. At the arranged meeting on a boat, Michael finds a bomb on board and snags a sample of the C4 to trace the maker before jumping out to watch it blow up.
70	8	"Hard Out"	Craig Siebels	Rashad Raisani	August 11, 2011	BN508	4.75
During a CIA extraction mission in the Caribbean, Michael, Jesse, and Pearce get trapped by a group of sadistic mercenaries hired by an oil cartel plotting a hostile takeover of protected oil wells in South America. Pretending to be on their side, the trio work to get access to the list of government outposts the mercenaries are after and are nearly outed by an actual security team from the company, so Michael turns the lead mercenary against his boss and takes him, the file, and the man who sold it all directly to the CIA. Back in Miami, in order to find out who made the bomb intended for Michael's doppelgänger, Fi does a favor for an ex-boyfriend (Guest Star: Gavin Rossdale) with the expertise, which involves stealing an arms shipment from a heavily guarded facility. Although she deplores the man, she does the job and gives Michael the information at a couples dinner with Maddie and her new boyfriend.
71	9	"Eye for an Eye"	Jeremiah S. Chechik	Michael Horowitz	August 18, 2011	BN509	5.32
Jesse takes a company gig securing the home of a pharmaceuticals magnate (Guest Star: James Frain) and brings Fi along to help, but they soon learn the attempted burglar is the real good guy and the other man is a greedy fraud. To correct a massive injustice, and make sure an important medical discovery is released for the public good, the whole team pitches in to make the executive paranoid enough to grant them complete access to his company; they do so well, they are forced to stop him from securing the discovery in a vault and expose himself for what he really is. On the other hand, Michael and Sam rush to Tallahassee to interrogate the bomb maker, an aging war criminal, and, despite his attempts to stall them, they find an angle that gets him talking. He directs them to the man who hired him, who interprets the contact as a distress call and comes to kill the bomb maker, but the old man uses his dying words to tell Michael where to find him.
72	10	"Army of One"	Tawnia McKiernan	Alfredo Barrios, Jr.	August 25, 2011	BN510	4.58
Michael joins Jesse on what is supposed to be a simple security job, protecting a billionaire businessman from corporate spies, yet it quickly devolves into a serious hostage crisis at a private airport, with Maddie among the prisoners. From opposite sides, Michael and Jesse distract the criminals with a wild goose chase to keep those in danger out of harm’s way and then, once they’re safe, point the cops in the bad guys’ direction. Meanwhile, with the team split due to uncertainty over Michael's status as a murder suspect, Fi and Sam strong-arm a programmer into seeing what the assassin was hiding on a computer he tried to burn. Once they’ve recovered the data by using a computer lab that’s under police surveillance, Michael is forced to hand over the evidence he’s compiled to Pearce, with some key information – like the true killer’s name -- held back.
73	11	"Better Halves"	Michael Smith	Lisa Joy	September 1, 2011	BN511	4.07
In an attempt to win brownie points with Pearce, Michael teams up with Fi on an undercover CIA gig in South America, extracting a traitorous bioweapons expert and his wife. Once they find the couple, they discover the wife is unhappy about their situation and, despite her husband’s fears, secure a deal to win them to their side. The men shake off one of the couple’s Russian bodyguards but the women get trapped in an abandoned bar so, despite the husband’s willingness to cut his losses, Michael rescues them and allows the wife a deal for her testimony. Meanwhile, after following the money to Max’s killer, Sam and Jesse arrange a trap for him, but he doesn't bite and takes Sam prisoner in order to get a meeting with Michael. As they’re waiting and stalling on Michael’s behalf, he returns home and is arrested on the spot by Pearce, who, despite his protests, now thinks he killed Max.
74	12	"Dead to Rights"	Matt Nix	Jason Tracey	September 8, 2011	BN512	4.39
An aggravated Pearce conditionally agrees to let Michael talk with Max's killer, but, though he confesses, he commits suicide rather than risking arrest, warning Michael in advance it isn't over for him. Shortly thereafter, Michael's mentor Larry surprises him and forces him to help him break into the British consulate to plant false documents using the access of a DIA psychiatrist named Anson, whose wife he's using as leverage. Shockingly, the woman ends up dead anyway, prompting Fi to go to extremes to help Michael get free of Larry the psycho once and for all, even if it means setting off a bomb at the consulate. That causes a chain reaction which ends up killing innocent people and soon Anson steps forward to reveal himself as the ultimate puppet master: he's a co-founder, and the last member, of the organization that burned Michael, though his history with Michael goes back to before his father died, and now he's planning to use the bombing to make Michael do his bidding.
75	13	"Damned If You Do"	Stephen Surjik	Matt Nix	November 3, 2011	BN513	2.86
As Michael is going through the process of being cleared for a return to action by the CIA, Anson sends him on a mission to Puerto Rico to obtain a copy of a computer program that will wipe out any trace of Anson's existence. Michael and Fi abduct the creator and bring him to Miami to track down his program, but he tells them it's locked in a government lab and they're not the only ones after it. Using one of the facility's security features to their advantage, the team makes a deal with the programmer's enemy to retrieve the program and make a copy while making sure he's the only one who gets caught. At the same time, Sam and Jesse work with Maddie to see if the police are looking at Fi yet, only to discover that Anson really is holding all the cards, which, along with Michael's new CIA status, he intends to wield against him to turn him into a double agent.
76	14	"Breaking Point"	Renny Harlin	Ben Watkins & Rashad Raisani	November 10, 2011	BN514	2.66
An old friend (from Episode 2.6 "Bad Blood") comes to Michael after his brother, Michael's childhood best friend and an ex-con, is killed by a gangster to cover up the assassination of the gang's leader. Working off tips from an informant, they hatch a plan to make the murderer reveal stolen cash so they can rat him out to the police, but they lose key information when the gangster sends a hit man to kill their source. To keep his friend from taking justice into his own hands, Michael decides to use the gang's internal conflict to sow mistrust and force the gangster to tell the cops everything. Meanwhile, the team tries to get a leg up on Anson and take his leverage away to help Michael, except all they find is a military antenna for sending encrypted messages, so Michael is resigned to using his CIA clearance to go ahead and make Anson a ghost again by downloading the virus onto their servers.
77	15	"Necessary Evil"	Alfredo Barrios, Jr.	Craig O'Neill	November 17, 2011	BN515	2.36
Concerned that a weapons expert has gone rogue, the CIA tells Michael to oversee Sam and Jesse in finding out what is going on, but they learn that a Liberian warlord is using the man's daughter to force him to build a guided missile. Perilous as the situation is, the three team up to sabotage the project and stall long enough to get everyone, including the girl, out alive. Frustrated by all the delays, the murderous warlord brings the daughter to the work site as motivation, so Michael makes it look like the sabotage is from within the Liberian group, though the end result displeases Michael's superiors. Then, after the team discovers Anson has been using Maddie's boyfriend to spy on Michael, she pitches in to help them listen in on his calls with Anson, although the surveillance is short-lived when he sends a bomb to kill the suitor after he starts to get cold feet about his assignment.
78	16	"Depth Perception"	Craig Siebels	Peter Lalayanis & Ryan Johnson	December 1, 2011	BN516	3.12
Sam reunites with his friend Beatriz (Ilza Rosario; from Burn Notice: The Fall of Sam Axe) to save her from someone who is after her for an article she wrote, and, at Sam's suggestion, Michael brings Anson in to assist. Michael learns it's a Russian spy she outed and, under Anson's probing observation, he and Sam track the man to flush him out of hiding before he can kill her. Eventually, Michael realizes the only way to get him out of her life is to talk with the guy's handler, who's aware of Michael and isn't interested in his involvement, and have him tell his asset to stand down. Later, Jesse and Fi return from the Cayman Islands with Anson's fortune, after faking the death of a banker they blackmailed, but the team's latest hope of shaking off Anson are dashed when he makes the feds believe Sam's betrayed his country. Fi suggests she leave Miami, but Michael, who continues to learn about Anson's role in his life, remains unwilling to let her go.
79	17	"Acceptable Loss"	Jonathan Frakes	Ben Watkins	December 8, 2011	BN517	2.79
An attaché who Jesse knows asks him to bring down the man he's assigned to, a dirty diplomat who's abusing his diplomatic privilege to smuggle blood diamonds. The team's initial plan to get inside the man's guarded house and take evidence of his misdeeds out of his vault is unexpectedly ruined, but Jesse's legacy-minded friend decides to sacrifice his life to bring the diplomat to justice. In the interim, with encouragement from his mother to find a way to stop Anson, Michael negotiates with Pearce to talk with his old pal Vaughn to find out what the man is up to. Much to Michael's dismay, Vaughn tells him that he only got part of the organization and that Anson is resurrecting it from the parts that still exist.
80	18	"Fail Safe"	Renny Harlin	Matt Nix	December 15, 2011	BN518	2.89
Now that Anson's aims are known, Michael and the team determine to stop him, but his evasiveness and deviousness only serve to increase frustration within the team. While Sam and Fi continue looking for something they can use on Anson, Michael is assigned to lead his first official CIA team since he was burned, with orders to bring a spy recruiter (guest star Eric Roberts) in for rendition. One failed snatch-and-grab later, Michael gives it another go with Jesse as a prospect for their target before Anson steps in and tells Michael to burn the team so he can restart his organization; Michael and his friends talk it over and decide to take one last shot at wiggling out before they let Fi go. Despite the efforts of Anson's mole within the CIA team (Kristanna Loken), the mission succeeds without any collateral damage and Michael races to stop Anson from separating him and Fi, but he arrives too late, as she turns herself in to save the man she loves.
