= Burn Notice: The Fall of Sam Axe =

2011 television film directed by Jeffrey Donovan

- Promotional poster
- Based on: Burn Notice by Matt Nix
- Screenplay by: Matt Nix
- Story by: Matt Nix; Greg Hart
- Directed by: Jeffrey Donovan
- Starring: Bruce Campbell; Kiele Sanchez; RonReaco Lee; Chandra West; John Diehl; Pedro Pascal; Ilza Rosario; Jeffrey Donovan
- Narrated by: Bruce Campbell
- Theme music composer: John Dickson
- Country of origin: United States

Production
- Producers: Aaron Ginsburg; Lorenzo O'Brien
- Cinematography: Jaime Reynoso
- Editor: Steven Lang
- Running time: 87 minutes 89 minutes (extended version)
- Production companies: Flying Glass of Milk Productions; Fuse Entertainment; Fox Television Studios

Original release
- Network: USA Network
- Release: April 17, 2011

Burn Notice: The Fall of Sam Axe is a 2011 American television film based on the USA Network television series Burn Notice. It was the first and only official Burn Notice spin-off, starring Bruce Campbell, and directed by Jeffrey Donovan. The show was broadcast in the United States on April 17, 2011, on the U.S. television network USA Network. The film, while not an episode of the show, introduced plot elements for the show's fifth season.

== Plot ==
Set two years before the pilot episode, the film is narrated by Sam Axe (Bruce Campbell), a US Navy SEAL Commander, who is being questioned by Admiral Lawrence (John Diehl) about a mission in Colombia. Sam reveals that he had unwittingly had an affair with a superior's wife (Chandra West) and that he was punished with a dangerous mission: to track down a terrorist group known as the Espada Ardiente and assess the need for American support against them.

In Colombia, Sam meets his new team, including Commandante Veracruz (Pedro Pascal), then goes to a local clinic to tell them that they're in danger only to be brushed off by the two employees, doctor Ben Delaney (RonReaco Lee) and charity worker Amanda Maples (Kiele Sanchez). Later, while scouting the area against orders, Sam discovers that Veracruz and his men are preparing to attack the clinic themselves and kill him to game the system for aid, so Sam sneaks off to the clinic to sound the alarm again, yet they still won't take his help. Thinking Sam has been kidnapped, Veracruz moves quickly to destroy the clinic but a local teenager, an orphan girl named Beatriz (Ilza Rosario), gets to the clinic early and tells Sam that Veracruz is on his way. Once he's convinced Ben and Amanda of the danger, Sam helps them get all the patients out and blow up the clinic as a distraction for the escape. Beatriz suggests hiding with her only friends, the Espada Ardiente, which works for Sam and his mission, especially since they have no alternative. Upon their arrival, Sam discovers that the Espada Ardiente is merely a small, but resilient, group of shepherds on a small farm that the corrupt Veracruz is trying to secure as a way-point for drug transportation. After watching them do very basic training and promising Amanda he won't leave them, Sam heads back to Veracruz's camp to call for support and stall long enough for help to arrive. Veracruz calls his bluff and almost forces him to reveal where the Espada Ardiente are hiding out, but the farmers give Sam a way out and he escapes back to them, where he apologizes and tells them how they can all help him stop Veracruz. Together they then travel to a CIA outpost to ask for help, narrowly escaping a trap set by Veracruz along the road. They arrive at the isolated outpost and find themselves under close observation, and is practically empty except for two men and some radio equipment, which they use to call for assistance. Sam is instructed that nothing will happen until he travels to the nearest military base first to detail the situation. Again, Sam promises he'll return and gets on the helicopter with the two men, but they admit nobody is coming until they go through the proper channels, and that the locals are essentially being left for dead in a "compromised" facility, giving Sam no choice except to force them to land at gunpoint.

In the present, the Admiral tips his hand that things are heading towards a trial, but Sam refuses a lawyer and continues his story.

At the outpost in Colombia, Sam strong-arms the CIA men into calling for backup, which won't arrive for three hours, leaving him and the others to hold off Veracruz as long as possible. Their odds get worse when reinforcements show up for Veracruz, and, despite their best efforts to block his path, eventually they run out of ammunition and must retreat back to the outpost. Still anticipating assistance, Sam has the guys call out again, birthing his alias "Chuck Finley," and learns that they won't have enough time. Shortly thereafter, Veracruz arrives on scene, so Sam buys time for his buddies, who refuse to surrender and take shelter in a barn. Just as they prepare to flee, the cavalry arrives to save the day. Once Veracruz and his forces are in custody, and all of Sam's friends have said their goodbyes, he is escorted back to the base to testify.

The Admiral evaluates the situation and threatens Sam with a court martial, but Sam has an ace up his sleeve: Beatriz, seeking redemption for influencing her friends to fight in the first place, has photographs of the entire operation and published them in Colombia's largest newspaper with his encouragement. He then strikes a graymail deal with Lawrence, promising to remain silent about the whole thing in exchange for the following: exoneration for all his friends; rebuilding the clinic; leaving the farmers alone to their herds; finally, for himself, an honorable discharge with full pension, a first-class plane ticket to the city of his choice, (Miami), a change of clothes, and an ice-cold beer.

== Cast ==
- Bruce Campbell as Sam Axe
- Kiele Sanchez as Amanda Maples
- RonReaco Lee as Ben Delaney
- Chandra West as Donna Maitland
- John Diehl as Admiral James G. Lawrence
- Pedro Pascal as Comandante Veracruz
- Ilza Rosario as Beatriz
- Jeffrey Donovan as Michael Westen (cameo)

== Production ==
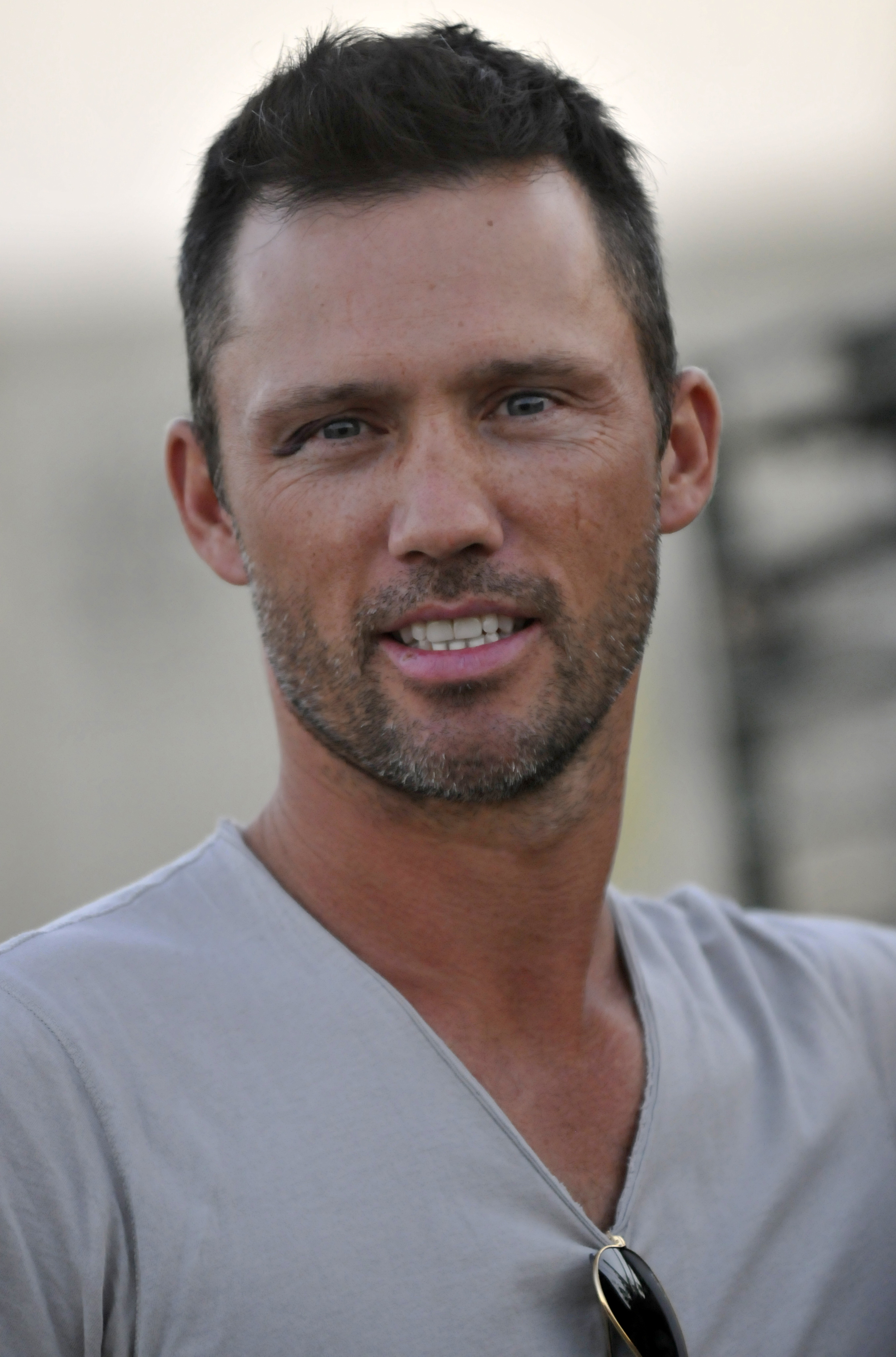
Jeffrey Donovan, star of Burn Notice, directed the film and made a small cameo appearance.

=== Development ===
The film was announced in the summer of 2010 at the annual San Diego Comic-Con, and it was revealed that it would serve as a lead-in to the show's fifth season. Jeffrey Donovan, star of Burn Notice, was later announced to be the director of the film. Donovan had made his directorial debut one year earlier with the Burn Notice fourth season episode "Made Man".

=== Casting ===
The full cast was confirmed by January 2011, and included Bruce Campbell, Chandra West, RonReaco Lee, Kiele Sanchez and John Diehl. Jeffrey Donovan made a small, previously unannounced cameo appearance as Michael Westen, the main character of Burn Notice.

=== Filming ===
Filming began in January 2011 in Bogota, Colombia.

== Reception ==
The film received mixed reviews. Matt Fowler of IGN gave it a 7 out of 10, calling it an "enjoyable distraction," but adding that it "fails to live up to Sam Axe standards." Scott Von Doviak of the A.V. Club gave the film a B−, explaining that it "sounded promising" but "has the routine rhythms of a straight-to-DVD action movie sequel." He added: "fans should enjoy Campbell's performance, but Sam Axe deserved a more interesting fall." Rob Frappier of Screen Rant wrote that "Matt Nix has done a great job," specifically because of Sam's consistently funny "zingers." He later said that fans would enjoy the film.

=== Ratings ===
The event was viewed by 3.57 million viewers upon its first airing. In the 18–49 demographic, there were 1.44 million viewers. It was the 23rd most-watched show on cable television that week.

== Home media ==
The DVD release included special features, a mockumentary titled The Fall of Jeffrey Donovan, audio commentary, deleted scenes and a feature at the 2010 San Diego Comic-Con.
