= Point of Entry (disambiguation) =

Point of Entry is a 1981 album by Judas Priest.

Point of Entry may also refer to:

- "Point of Entry" (audio drama), a 2010 Doctor Who: The Lost Stories audio drama
- Point of Entry (TV series), a 2010–2014 Singaporean action drama series
- Point of Entry, a 2007 television film starring Holly Marie Combs

== See also ==
- Entry point, in computer programming, a memory address
- "Entry Point" (Burn Notice), a 2010 TV episode
- Port of entry, a place where one may lawfully enter a country
