= Burn Notice season 4 =

Burn Notice
- Season 4
- DVD cover
- No. of episodes: 18

Release
- Original network: USA Network
- Original release: June 3 – December 16, 2010

Season chronology
- ← Previous; Season 3 Next → Season 5

The fourth season of the American television spy drama Burn Notice premiered on June 3, 2010 on the cable television channel USA Network. Coby Bell joined the main cast as Jesse Porter, a counter-intelligence agent Michael unwittingly burns.

== Season overview ==
As the fourth season opens, Michael sits alone in a well-furnished room, where he meets his new handler, Vaughn (Robert Wisdom). Vaughn attempts to lure Michael into the organization by attempting to befriend him, and tells Michael the organization is now on the hunt for a terrorist mastermind. Michael agrees to work with Vaughn on the condition Vaughn does not interfere or question his methods. Vaughn agrees, but as they begin their search, Michael is duped into burning another domestic spy, a counter-intelligence agent named Jesse Porter (Coby Bell). Jesse, unaware of who burned him, seeks out Michael for assistance. Michael brings Jesse into his team to restore Jesse to his previous position but soon learns he plans to kill whoever burned him.

The trail of the terrorist mastermind leads back to Simon (Garret Dillahunt), who informs Michael that a powerful international telecommunications businessman, John Barrett (Robert Patrick), has what Michael needs to dismantle the organization. Simon gives Michael a tape proving Vaughn helped burn him, and a bible that can be used to decode an as-yet-unknown document. Using the bible as bait, Michael lures Barrett to Miami to discuss what it decodes. At the same time Barrett arrives in Miami, Jesse learns it was Michael who burned him. Michael goes ahead with the meeting, unsure of Jesse's willingness to come to his aid.

In the mid-season finale, Barrett reveals that the bible decodes a non-official cover (NOC) list naming the members of the organization. Vaughn, however, spoils Michael's plan by showing up with guns blazing at the meeting. Thanks to some timely but painful assistance from Jesse (shooting Michael through the shoulder to free him from a chokehold), Michael and Barrett flee the scene and crash, and Michael is seen bleeding as someone wearing military boots takes the briefcase containing the bible. Barrett is killed in the crash.

As it turns out, Fiona and Sam had determined that the mystery man was one of Barrett's men named Sweeney. Sweeney had a hidden agenda and attempted to use an outside source to decode the bible. However, Jesse and Michael find Sweeney dead and Sweeney's partner/killer on the run. The four track him through to the Dominican Republic and take back the list, which is stored on a thumb drive and already decoded by Sweeney's partner. Afterward, they ponder the possibilities of how to properly flush out those whose names are on the list.

After much consideration, Michael decides to hand the list to Marv (Richard Kind), Jesse's old handler whom Jesse trusts fully. Despite much difficulty in convincing Marv, they finally meet to hand over the list, but the plan unravels when Michael's old nemesis Tyler Brennen (Jay Karnes) hears of the transaction and holds Marv's wife hostage. The meet ends with Brennen in possession of the list and Marv dead. Threatening to send Vaughn the audio recordings of Michael's conversations with Marv, Brennen blackmails Michael into identifying and killing people on the list, hiring Larry Sizemore (Tim Matheson) to assist and monitor Michael. Instead, after Michael learns the location of the list, Larry double-crosses and kills Brennen in hopes of retrieving the list himself. But Larry finds that Fiona, Sam, and Jesse had already recovered it, and he is forced to wait for the police to arrest him after Sam trains a laser-sighted rifle at him.

After Vaughn learns of Michael's betrayal and possession of the list, he mobilizes a large force to kill Michael and retrieve it. He uses the organization's "bought off" agents in government and law enforcement to deny Michael, Fiona, and Jesse any help. While this is going on, Sam and Madeline contact a United States Congressman (John Doman), whom they had met in a previous episode, for help. While he is initially skeptical, given their history, he is eventually convinced and sends a military team to save Michael and Fiona. The season ends with Michael being whisked away to Washington, D.C. to meet a man identified as Raines (Dylan Baker), who tells him, "Welcome back."

== Cast ==
=== Main ===
- Jeffrey Donovan as Michael Westen
- Gabrielle Anwar as Fiona Glenanne
- Coby Bell as Jesse Porter
- Bruce Campbell as Sam Axe
- Sharon Gless as Madeline Westen

=== Recurring ===
- Robert Wisdom as Vaughn Anderson
- Richard Kind as Marvin "Marv" Peterson
- Navi Rawat as Kendra
- Paul Tei as Barry Burkowski
- Marc Macaulay as Agent Harris
- Brandon Morris as Agent Lane
- Jay Karnes as Tyler Brennen
- John Doman as Bill Cowley
- Robert Patrick as John Barrett
- Danny Pino as Adam Scott
- Tommy Groth as Rudy
- Arturo Fernandez as Sugar
- Garret Dillahunt as Simon Escher
- Callie Thorne as Natalie Rice
- Seth Peterson as Nate Westen
- Adam Clark as Tony Soto
- Tim Matheson as "Dead" Larry Sizemore
- Dylan Baker as Raines

The main cast from the previous three seasons returned, with one addition. Jeffrey Donovan returned as Michael Westen, Gabrielle Anwar as Fiona Glenanne, Bruce Campbell as Sam Axe, and Sharon Gless as Madeline Westen. Coby Bell joined the cast as a counter-intelligence expert, Jesse Porter, whom Michael unwittingly burns.

Like the first three seasons, the fourth included several recurring guests. Robert Wisdom made several appearances as Vaughn, Michael's point of contact with Management. Garret Dillahunt returned as Simon Escher, the man who committed the crimes used to burn Michael. Navi Rawat portrayed Kendra, an assassin. Seth Peterson reprised his role as Michael's brother, Nate, while Paul Tei returned as money-launderer Barry Burkowski. Arturo Fernandez returned for one episode as Sugar, Michael's former neighbor and a drug dealer. Marc Macaulay and Brandon Morris returned for multiple appearances as Agents Harris and Lane. The character of John Barrett, played by Robert Patrick, was introduced as a part of the conspiracy behind Michael's burn. Tim Matheson and Jay Karnes returned, in the same episode, as villains "Dead" Larry Sizemore and Tyler Brennen. Richard Kind guest starred in three episodes as Marv, Jesse's old handler. John Doman appeared as Congressman Bill Cowley in two episodes. Other notable one-time guests included Adam Clark, Alan Dale, Benito Martinez, Burt Reynolds, Michael Rooker, Callie Thorne, and Frank Whaley. Dylan Baker can be seen in the last few moments of the final episode as Raines, the man who welcomes Michael back into the agency.

== Episodes ==
No. overall	No. in season	Title	Directed by	Written by	Original release date	Prod. code	US viewers (millions)
45	1	"Friends and Enemies"	Tim Matheson	Matt Nix	June 3, 2010	BN401	6.62
Despite reservations about helping the people who burned him, Michael makes a deal with his new friend, Vaughn, to take down the war-mongers behind Simon’s release, as long as he can do it his way. After returning to his relieved family and friends, Michael finds Sam and Fi in dire need of his help to protect a lawyer from his client’s ex-boyfriend, who is a key member of a dangerous biker gang. Though slightly disappointed his team soldiered on without him, Michael steps in to give the gang’s hardened leader the impression that letting the lawyer live is in the organization’s best interests, even if the ex-boyfriend disagrees. In his first official mission for Vaughn, Michael follows a lead on a key member of the group that freed Simon, but he is displeased to find that in doing so he has burned a counter-intelligence agent named Jesse Porter.
46	2	"Fast Friends"	Dennie Gordon	Rashad Raisani	June 10, 2010	BN402	5.67
As part of his investigation for Vaughn, and having determined not to see a fellow spy marginalized like he was, a conflicted Michael formally meets Jesse Porter, who, in his own attempt to find whoever burned him, has run into trouble with a Chinese drug dealer who believes Jesse stole money from him. With the dealer under government protection, and Jesse keen on being part of the action, the challenge for Michael and the team is to get the drug runners out of Jesse’s hair while keeping him alive, which eventually requires making the boss believe the theft was an inside job. Now that Jesse is part of the team, Michael is forced into high gear to balance his work for a pressing Vaughn with the reality that the person Jesse wants to kill is now right under his nose.
47	3	"Made Man"	Jeffrey Donovan	Alfredo Barrios, Jr.	June 17, 2010	BN403	5.31
While helping Jesse continue tracking leads from his work at the intelligence office, Michael and the team discover that vicious mobsters, who have connections in New York, are using the local port for racketeering. When Michael’s cover is blown on the first pass at the local boss, Sam takes the lead increasing the pressure the man is already under and pushes him into doing something that will discredit him for good. Back on the investigation front, Michael and Jesse follow a lead on illegal arms shipments that points the team to the Bahamas while Maddie, in getting to know Jesse, figures out who burned him and confronts Michael about it, warning him that “lies get out.”
48	4	"Breach of Faith"	Jeremiah S. Chechik	Ben Watkins	June 24, 2010	BN404	5.33
As a favor for helping out with the tip Fi and Jesse brought back from the Bahamas, Sam asks Michael to give him a hand with one of his military charities, which is in danger of being shut down after one of the owners lost all the organization’s money in a scam. The guy tries taking matters into his own hands but just makes things worse and creates a standoff with the police, so Michael and Sam make every effort to get the money back for the charity and ensure the scam artist is the only one who gets caught. When Michael and Jesse go to look for more clues from their dead gun runner, they come up empty until they find his dangerous neighbor, Kendra (Navi Rawat) trying to make off with a critical piece of evidence.
49	5	"Neighborhood Watch"	Kevin Bray	Michael Horowitz	July 1, 2010	BN405	5.21
A friend of Maddie’s asks Michael to help her boyfriend, a determined charitable doctor who is being threatened by vicious drug dealers terrorizing his neighborhood. With Michael focused on getting hold of Kendra, the professional killer who almost escaped with their tape, so he can question her, the rest of the team climbs the ladder to the top of the drug-dealing operation, which is led by a psycho who is indebted to a Mexican cartel. To keep him from shutting down the clinic, Michael and the team decide to let the doctor stand up to his bully while they provide the backing to see it through. Meanwhile, Michael’s game of cat-and-mouse with Kendra moves to the next stage when he’s able to knock her out during their exchange and capture her for interrogation.
50	6	"Entry Point"	Jeffrey Hunt	Craig O'Neill	July 15, 2010	BN406	5.65
Michael and Fi get a referral from a forger who recently did some work for an elusive international antiquities thief with a penchant for explosions and discover that the target is a valuable sword. They manage to convince the sword’s owner that the theft is an inside job, but it turns out the real culprit was the man’s own secretary. Simultaneously, Jesse interrogates the captured assassin, Kendra, to find out who hired her; but she refuses to answer his questions, and offers instead to pay him to let her go. The team tries to trace the money to her employers and hits a dead end, so they outwit her by making her believe she’s been betrayed. She then breaks and gives up the information about a safety deposit box in Miami.
51	7	"Past & Future Tense"	Jeremiah S. Chechik	Jason Tracey	July 22, 2010	BN407	5.87
After a brief meeting with Jesse’s old boss Marv to see if he’ll help with their investigation, Michael spies a Russian wetworks team and follows them to an aging spy (Guest Star: Burt Reynolds), who made a lot of enemies on both sides of the Cold War. To save his life, Michael has to help him outrun the Russians while also getting in touch with a high-ranking Congressman, intending to blackmail to protect the old man, only to have him call their bluff. With the Russians tracking them, it’s a simple task to set a trap for them and use their capture as leverage to force the congressman’s hand. Fi and Jesse, however, continue to press Marv, who finds the safety deposit box as well as evidence that would point Jesse to Michael’s role in losing his job; even though Fi destroys it, she protests keeping the secret and accuses Michael of caring more about his mission than the people who always support him.
52	8	"Where There's Smoke"	Kevin Bray	Lisa Joy	July 29, 2010	BN408	5.38
Sam and Fi go undercover for a black tie party to protect a valuable new piece of technology only to discover that it’s the creator’s wife the criminals are after, and Fi is taken with her. Although Fi does what she can to get both of them out alive, she’s left to fend for herself when the other woman’s husband pays his part of the ransom, putting Michael and the guys into a race against a short clock to find his wife and save her. Then, after scouting the security at the bank with the safety deposit box, Michael and Jesse make a quick heist to empty its contents: a family Bible that functions as a cipher, made by Simon.
53	9	"Center of the Storm"	Colin Bucksey	Ryan Johnson & Peter Lalayanis	August 5, 2010	BN409	5.69
The FBI asks Michael to do them a favor by tracking down a key witness in a murder trial, a good guy who ran for his life and disappeared after the criminals he’s testifying against sent an assassin to kill him right before a hurricane. Thinking it will be the best way to find the guy, Michael goes looking for the assassin and gets dragged into working with him as a rival assassin, while he and the team get creative to pass updates to each other on locating the witness. Michael loses his cover when the real rival assassin shows up, so he appeals to his captor’s better nature to get everyone out alive. Also, with the Bible in hand, and trying to stay in control of the investigation, a miniature fight breaks out between Michael and Vaughn over whether he should let Michael meet with Simon, a fight he wins by using his FBI friends to force Vaughn’s hand.
54	10	"Hard Time"	Dennie Gordon	Alfredo Barrios, Jr.	August 12, 2010	BN410	5.57
With freedom in sight, an imprisoned friend of Sam’s is on the hit list of a dangerous prison gang after turning down an illegal request from a high-ranking member, so Michael steps in to protect him behind bars. After fending off an initial attack, Michael calls on his team to orchestrate a breakout during an arranged prison riot then swaps the gang member for Sam’s friend at the last minute after he’s unable to make the escape, bringing more closure than expected. Meanwhile, after his first meeting with Simon leads him to a buried coffin with important evidence, Michael discovers Vaughn was key in having him burned. In a follow-up with Simon, he then agrees to help him bring down Vaughn and his organization by starting with a businessman named John Barrett, even though he tells Vaughn otherwise.
55	11	"Blind Spot"	Michael Smith	Michael Horowitz	August 19, 2010	BN411	5.50
Fiona and Sam team up to go after a con man who uses his charm to target emotionally vulnerable women for their money. They try to wear him down enough that he will hand over his bank information so they can get the money back, but he and his associates are much more resilient than anticipated, so they bring in Michael to make it clear he has no choice except to hand over the money and run. Meanwhile, Michael and Jesse try to convince Barrett to come to Miami to make a deal for the Bible, and they’re successful; however, with Maddie now on the list of people unhappy with Jesse’s situation, he finds proof that Michael burned him and makes it clear that some kind of judgment is coming.
56	12	"Guilty as Charged"	Jeremiah S. Chechik	Matt Nix	August 26, 2010	BN412	6.29
With Jesse in the wind looking for him, Michael works with a big-shot criminal defense attorney to save his daughter after a murderer he's representing threatens her life as a hedge against an upcoming verdict. An attempt at a stealth rescue is stopped by her kidnappers before it starts, so the team must instead create a situation that gives them enough time to secure her safe return while also not freeing a guilty man. As for Jesse, Michael tries to plead his case and persuade Jesse to back him up at the meeting he set up with Barrett, to no avail; the meeting doesn't go any better, as Vaughn shows up despite promising he’d stay away. In the ensuing chaos, Barrett escapes with Michael, who was seriously injured by Jesse in an effort to protect him, but, despite a last-ditch move to get rid of Barrett, Michael ends up left for dead in the street after an unseen person takes off with both the Bible and the NOC list that it decodes.
57	13	"Eyes Open"	Dennie Gordon	Jason Tracey	November 11, 2010	BN413	4.32
Directly following the events of the previous episode, Michael wakes up in the hospital and sees that the lawyer he helped has now arranged a bombing in retaliation against the people who kidnapped his daughter. Defying doctors’ orders to rest, and determined not to see more innocent people hurt in a petty war, Michael finds the fanatical bomber and works an angle to stop him, only to have his insanity get in the way of resolution. To bring that about, and save countless lives, they use one of his bombs to locate him and get the addresses of the other bombs before the one he’s holding goes off. Meanwhile, with the heat on Barrett’s company, Vaughn departs Miami, leaving Michael and his team to go after the NOC list. With Jesse on board to help, despite great reservation, they follow the list as it changes hands and ends up with a cryptologist who knows how dangerous it is.
58	14	"Hot Property"	Jonathan Frakes	Rashad Raisani	November 18, 2010	BN414	3.50
Fi and Jesse take the case of a man who claims his sister has been kidnapped by her abusive boyfriend, a corrupt Venezuelan diplomat, but they and Michael discover that he’s only being used by the thief who stole Barry’s ledger (Episode 3.8: "Friends Like These") as she attempts to avoid jail by retrieving a powerful chemical weapon she stole for Venezuelan rebels. Painted into a corner by the circumstances, they team up with her in a bid to flush the weapon out and get it back in a pre-dawn attack on the well-defended storage location. After the thief escapes yet again, with the weapon, Michael and the team manage to manufacture a fake that leads them to her own exchange, giving them the opportunity to get her out of the stealing game for good. Also, while working to rebuild trust, Michael and Jesse discover that the cryptologist is selling the list, so they contact a hesitant Marv and convince him to help them crash the auction.
59	15	"Brotherly Love"	Terry Miller	Ben Watkins	December 2, 2010	BN415	3.70
Having sent Sam and Jesse to the Dominican Republic for the list, Michael and Fi help his brother, anxiously expectant father Nate, and his friends, two brothers who run a garage that has lost a car filled with drugs belonging to a drug kingpin. Since the car was stolen by professionals, Michael brings back an old cover (see: Episode 2.11, "Hot Spot") to find the thief, but discovers that it was the kingpin's right-hand man who arranged the whole deal and took the drugs. Nate and Fi find the car and steal it back to keep him from pinning everything on the brothers, then sneak it in to his own backyard to make sure he gets the blame. Down in the Caribbean, Sam and Jesse have been working out a plan to steal the list, which is carried by motorcycle couriers around the clock, before the auction. Michael and Fi join them to ambush the runner, then they all return to Miami to decide who they will trust to bring everyone on the list to justice.
60	16	"Dead or Alive"	Peter Markle	Lisa Joy	December 9, 2010	BN416	4.34
A cop friend of Sam's, who's suspected of being dirty, has disappeared, so Michael and the team jump into action to find him, only to learn that his partner is the dirty one and had him killed to cover up his crimes. To clear a good man's name, Michael and the team go to great lengths to make sure his partner is caught with stolen drugs, a tough task considering how self-protective he is. Meanwhile, Michael decides to give the list to Marv, who doesn't quite trust him, in hopes that it will help him and Jesse get their old jobs back, as Fi and Maddie worry about Michael disappearing again. Things go wrong, though, at the hand-off, as Marv is killed after being forced to hand over the list to one of Michael's biggest enemies: Tyler Brennen.
61	17	"Out of the Fire"	Marc Roskin	Craig O'Neill	December 16, 2010	BN417	4.77
Now that he has all the cards, Brennen gives Michael a choice: kill the people on the list with help and supervision from his psychotic former mentor Larry, or face Vaughn's wrath after he receives a tape, whose delivery only Brennen can prevent, of Michael's meeting about it with Marv. Though he feels a bit guilty lying about his friend's death to the guy's family and the authorities, a grieving Jesse joins the rest of the team as they help Michael get the list back and put an end to Brennen's plan, only to have Larry take control by killing the first target and Brennen to get Michael all to himself. Michael's team steals the vault with the list and set Larry up for the police so Michael can escape his grip, but Brennen's death means the gang are staring down the barrel of an all-out war with Vaughn.
62	18	"Last Stand"	Stephen Surjik	Matt Nix	December 16, 2010	BN418	5.11
Fully on Vaughn's bad side, Michael and the team aim to keep the NOC list away from him so they can get it to someone in the government reliable enough to bring the organization down, and they settle on Congressman Cowley (from 4.7, "Past and Future Tense"). With Sam and Maddie working on the skeptical congressman, everyone else does their best to get the list to safety before they have to cut their plans short and outrun Vaughn's men into an abandoned hotel where they're quickly besieged. Vaughn plays every card he has to press Michael into giving him the list, from a wounded team member to even taking Maddie hostage after Sam encourages her to leave town, so Michael and Fi decide to make a last stand against Vaughn while Jesse takes the list. Just in time, Sam arrives with U.S. Army troops deployed by the congressman, ending the threat from Vaughn and his organization. As the wounded are tended to, Michael is ushered away for questioning by men in suits and ends up in D.C., where a man he recognizes offers cryptic congratulations as they walk into a government building.
