= Burn Notice season 6 =

Burn Notice
- Season 6
- DVD cover
- No. of episodes: 18

Release
- Original network: USA Network
- Original release: June 14 – December 20, 2012

Season chronology
- ← Previous; Season 5 Next → Season 7

The sixth season of the American television spy drama Burn Notice premiered on June 14, 2012, on the cable television channel USA Network.

== Season overview ==
Immediately after Fiona is arrested by the FBI, she is processed and taken into an interrogation room, where she is interrogated by Agent Jason Bly (Alex Carter), who is on loan from the CSS. Bly tries to get Fiona to implicate Michael in the British Consulate bombing, but she refuses to cooperate. Meanwhile, Michael and Sam pursue Anson Fullerton (Jere Burns) throughout Miami and corner him in a chemical plant, with eventual help from Agent Dani Pearce (Lauren Stamile). Anson does everything he can to stop Michael from pursuing him, even going as far as sending a former patient of his to Madeline's house. Michael brutally attacks Anson upon finding him, but is forced to let him escape after learning that he wired the building to explode. After warning Sam and Pearce, they make it out of the building when it explodes. Michael tries to shoot at Anson, but is furious that he got away. Pearce informs Michael that Anson just hit the top of the CIA's most wanted list, but all they can prove is that Anson tried to blow up her extraction team.

After Fiona is taken to a federal prison, she becomes marked for death and is targeted by inmates, but she makes an ally named Ayn in prison. Michael visits his former training officer, Tom Card (John C. McGinley) for help getting visitation rights to see Fiona, but Card initially denies his request. However, after Michael, Sam, and Jesse help Card take down a drug cartel, Card agrees to pull strings to grant him visitation rights. Michael also learns from his brother, Nate Westen (Seth Peterson) that Ruth left him and took their son with her, so Michael invites him to stay. The team help Pearce track down the man who killed her fiancée, who is currently a protected CIA asset, and trick him into giving up the intel the CIA needs in order to remove his protection.

Michael visits Fiona and promises to get her out, and they reminisce over their time in Belfast. Afterwards, Michael receives a note from Fiona, learning that someone is trying to kill her and is working with a dirty guard. Michael, Sam, and Jesse pay the guard a visit in the Everglades, only to find him dead. Sam is then kidnapped by former CIA operative-turned-traitor, Rebecca Lang (Kristanna Loken), so Michael and Jesse work to rescue him. However, upon learning that Rebecca is being blackmailed by Anson, who is threatening to have her brother killed, they offer to help her save him. As the team works to save Rebecca's brother, Michael also simultaneously works with Card to take down one of Fiona's weapons dealer in exchange for her release from prison. Both plans work, so Fiona becomes a CIA asset and Rebecca provides Michael with Anson's location where he's expecting his latest drop of travel documents and cash. After Michael tells Fiona that they found Anson, he informs her that she has to plead guilty to a few weapons charges and her sentence will be time served. Her release is put in jeopardy, however, when an MI6 agent tells her to either accompany him to their new British consulate or sign a new confession. His plan fails, however, when Fiona disappears for a little while and has Ayn find her.

Michael, Nate, and Jesse join Pearce and her extraction team in Atlantic City, but Michael gets angry at Nate for nearly jeopardizing their op twice, forcing him to leave. However, upon learning Anson's location and realizing that Nate is closer than they are, Michael has Nate keep eyes on Anson but warns him not to approach him. Nate, however, punches Anson and captures him, bringing him outside at gunpoint. Just when Michael and Pearce are about to arrest Anson, a mysterious sniper shoots Anson and Nate, killing them both. A heartbroken Michael breaks the news to Madeline, who does not take it well. Fiona is finally released from prison into Michael's arms, with Michael telling her he needs her more than ever.

After discovering that Rebecca has gone on the run, Michael and his friends believe that she was the one responsible for killing Nate. At the same time, Sam and Jesse have to help Elsa's (Jennifer Taylor) son, Evan, who's gotten into trouble with a loan shark. After taking the loan shark down, Michael sees Rebecca who shoots him, but he's wearing a bulletproof vest. Michael shoots Rebecca in retaliation and catches her in his loft. Rebecca tells Michael he wins and swears that she didn't kill Nate despite wanting Anson dead. Michael lets her go, and she says she hopes he finds whoever pulled the trigger. When Michael discovers that the FBI has closed the case on Nate's death, Sam tells Michael that a buddy of his at the FBI is willing to give him the file in return for taking down a Boston mob boss. As Michael, Sam, and Fi take him down, Jesse and Pearce work together to find the gun used in the shooting by tracking down the company who made it. Jesse plans to blackmail the VP of sales, who is the son of the company's owner. When he blackmails the son, Pearce comes in and backs Jesse up, concerning him since she showed her face. They get the records of all the gun sales, but since the CIA learned that Pearce was involved, she is reassigned to Mumbai.

Later, they learn that the group that bought the gun is the Pyron Group and its CEO is Jack Vale, so Michael and Sam pose as billionaires in the market for private military services when meeting him. Meanwhile, Fiona is recruited by CIA officers Matt Bailey and Gabriel Manaro to work a job for them, as part of her agreement with the CIA to get out of prison, so Michael helps them with their mission as Sam and Jesse infiltrate a mercenary training camp to track down a sniper. Once Fiona's CIA job was completed, she has Bailey and Manaro "lose" their agreement. Michael and Sam meet with Vale again, who is angry that they're looking for Tyler Gray (Kenny Johnson). When Vale is shot by an unknown operative, Michael tries to get answers but Vale dies.

Michael meets with Card who shows him a picture of Tyler Gray, the man who murdered Nate. Card sends Michael and his team down to Panama off-the-books, so before leaving, Michael talks to Madeline, who still blames him and everyone else for Nate's murder. After the team heads down to Panama, they meet with a CIA operative named Brady Pressman, who joins them in hunting Gray down. The op goes sideways as they're blown, but they continue to hunt for Gray. While in Panama, Michael promises Fiona that after they capture Gray, he'll leave the CIA, which makes her happy since she misses the times when it was just them working together. Eventually, Michael finally captures Gray, who reveals that Card sent them on a suicide mission to die. After learning that Gray was telling the truth, Michael grabs him and escapes with the team as an F18 air strike tries to kill them. Brady sacrifies himself to save the team as the air strike kills him, leading Card to believe that they were killed.

Stuck in Panama, the team resort to desperate measures to get back to Miami. They try to hijack a plane, but Gray tries to escape and Michael goes after him, but they're both kidnapped by a drug kingpin. Michael tries to work with Gray, who refuses to help since he read Michael's file. However, upon seeing Michael take 1500 volts to protect his friends, Gray helps Michael and they both escape. They hijack a plane again, and Gray regrets taking that shot to kill Anson since Nate was killed. Michael wants his help to go after the man who gave him the order, so Gray agrees to help him take down Card. Back in Miami, Gray lies to Card and makes him believe that Michael and his friends are dead.

As Gray works with the team to feed Card information they want him to believe, Ayn, who was released from federal prison, asks the team for help to get a dirty cop off her back since he's trying to send her back to jail. However, after the dirty cop grows a conscience, the team save his life and protect Ayn. They then have Gray wear a wire to get Card to confess his crimes, but when the frequency is jammed and a team shows up, Michael and Sam go in since Card plans to frame Gray. Michael confronts Card at gunpoint, who then kills Gray. Michael confronts him over not only ordering the hit on Anson that got Nate killed, but also trying to have him and his team killed. Card justifies his actions and makes it seem like he had to kill Gray in self-defense. After asking Michael if they can move into the future, Michael seems to agree, but then shoots Card in the head, killing him in cold-blood.

Sam angrily confronts Michael, who justifies his actions since Card was going to get away with it. The CIA respond to the scene and Michael becomes the target of their task force. Although Jesse and Fiona help Michael escape, Sam is caught by Agent Olivia Riley (Sonja Sohn), a heavy-hitting CIA Officer who literally "wrote the book" on counterintelligence. They set up an ambush in a boathouse and although Michael is almost killed, Riley is forced at gunpoint to order them to stand down. Michael and his friends capture Riley and take her someplace remote where Michael explains his side of the story, but Riley doesn't care and calls all four of them enemies of the United States of America, vowing to hunt Michael down to the ends of the earth.

Now fugitives, Michael, Sam, Fiona, and Jesse turn to smuggler Calvin Schmidt (Patton Oswalt) for help getting out of the country; in exchange for his help, first they take down a Syrian spy and get a piece of high-tech equipment that Schmidt's friend wants for $1,000,000. Meanwhile, Riley focuses her attention on Madeline, hoping to track down Michael. Madeline signs an agreement for Riley to provide her full cooperation, but Madeline continues to secretly help Michael and his friends. As Riley is spying on her, she eventually finds out that Madeline had Barry Burkowski (Paul Tei) throw up a financial smokescreen, leading to his arrest and Madeline becoming a fugitive as well.

Sam and Jesse get passport chips from James Vanek (Kevin McNally), who wants revenge against Schmidt. The team receives their new identities, but end up in a standoff against Vanek, who wants Schmidt dead. After learning that Schmidt knew Vanek tags his chips to give up the whereabouts of fugitives if he ever gets caught, Michael makes Schmidt believe that he's about to hand him over to Vanek until telling him to duck, shooting out an electrical box, giving them all a chance to escape with Madeline and Jesse. Schmidt tells Michael that their passports should be good but they shouldn't sit on them for too long in case Vanek gets caught. Madeline goes to visit Nate's grave and Michael joins her there, finding flowers and a card saying "Would love to chat. A friend."

Michael meets this "friend" at a diner in the middle of the night, who turns out to be Bly, hoping to offer him a deal. Bly wants Michael to let him be the one to bring him in. If Bly brings Michael in, then he can make Michael an official witness of the CSS since he's investigating Card due to him not being the "White Knight" the CIA believed him to be. Bly warns Michael that his actions have put Riley's reputation on the line and now she doesn't care who she has to hurt to get to him. Bly promises to look into it after Michael asks if his friends would be kept out of jail. The cops come for Michael, who realizes that Bly called them since Bly isn't supposed to have secret meetings with fugitives. Bly provides Michael with a burner phone before he leave.

Fiona confronts Michael about meeting with Bly, but Michael says there might be a way where they don't have to run. Fiona doesn't want him to accept deals where he ends up in prison, so they get ready to leave the country the next day, only to find out the Union Rep set them up. Riley and the CIA come after the team and during the ambush, Sam is shot and Jesse is captured. Sam claims that the bullet grazed him, but upon taking a CIA operative hostage and getting to safety, they discover that the gunshot wound is worse than he let on. The team have Fiona's ex-boyfriend, John Campbell (Gary Weeks) patch Sam up without taking him to a hospital. Meanwhile, Riley decides to use a good cop/bad cop approach and has one of her men beat Jesse up before stopping him. She offers to get Jesse back into CIFA with a clean slate if he cooperates with her. He refuses since he doesn't want to turn on his friends, so she tries a different approach and claims to have a file on his mother's killer, trying to emotionally manipulate him. However, Jesse gets angry when she speaks for his mother, so she warns him that was a bad decision. Michael and Fi gas the CIA safe house and rescue Jesse, inoculating him, the CIA operatives and even Riley to save their lives. Fiona takes them to a surgeon's house to save Sam's life, but along the way, Sam makes Michael promise to make this right. Michael promises before Sam loses consciousness.

At the house, the surgeon is able to get the bullet out and patch Sam up, so Sam wakes up and they hide out. At night, a hit team tries to take them out, so they discover that Riley has gone rogue and sent a drug cartel after them. After taking Sam to a hospital, Michael informs Bly of Riley's involvement with the cartel so they work together to get evidence against her. However, a guard working for the cartel throws a grenade in the car, killing Bly and destroying the evidence. After sneaking his way into a cartel boat, Riley and Michael confront each other at gunpoint as the Coast Guard follows them. Michael reveals that he called them, so Riley is shocked that he would get them both killed. Michael tells Riley that they finish this one way or another. Riley pretends to surrender and offers to confess, but Michael realizes that she would've falsified records to make it look like he was working with the cartel. As the Coast Guard shoots at the boat, Riley finally surrenders and tells Michael to call them off. Michael calls off the Coast Guard as Riley makes the call to confess her crimes. Afterwards, Michael, Sam, Jesse, Fiona, and Madeline turn themselves in.

After three weeks of being questioned about Riley and Card, Fiona is escorted out of her cell to see Michael outside, wearing a suit and giving orders to CIA officers. Fiona and Michael hug, before she asks him what's going on. Michael says that they'll all be released shortly, he just wants to talk to her first. Fiona reminds Michael of his promise to her in Panama to get out of the CIA. As Sam, Jesse, and Madeline are released, Michael informs Fiona that the CIA wasn't just going to forget everything that happened and release them, so he made a deal to get them all released. Fiona is upset and disappointed that Michael is back in the CIA.

== Cast ==
John C. McGinley appeared in six episodes as Tom Card, Michael's original CIA trainer. Taryn Manning appeared in one episode as one of Fiona's fellow prisoners. Jere Burns and Kristanna Loken returned to the series for multiple episodes as Anson Fullerton and Rebecca Lang, respectively. Lauren Stamile and Alex Carter also returned to the series as Dani Pearce and Jason Bly, respectively. Faran Tahir appeared in the third episode as Ahmed, a ruthless Lebanese agent. William Mapother appeared in the sixth episode as Garret Hartley, a mercenary hired to kill Barry (Paul Tei). Richard Burgi appeared in the seventh episode as a villain who has targeted Evan (Brando Eaton), the troubled son of Sam's new sugar momma, Elsa (played by Jennifer Taylor). Angélica Celaya guest starred in the ninth episode of the season as Angela Flores, a woman whose boyfriend is accused of illegally trading weapons on the black market. Chad Coleman appeared in the tenth episode as Brady Pressman, a CIA operative who, after failing in his mission to capture Anson alive, hopes to set things right. Also appearing in the tenth-to-twelfth episodes was Kenny Johnson as Tyler Gray, the trigger man behind the death of Michael's brother.

Patton Oswalt and Sonja Sohn each had guest appearances during the winter season. Oswalt appeared in episodes 14-16 as Calvin Schmidt, a smuggler whom the team contacts for help in escaping the country. Sohn plays Olivia Riley, a high-level CIA director who "literally [wrote] the book on counter-intel training and procedures", and she appeared on a recurring basis beginning with the thirteenth episode.

== Production ==
A sixth season, consisting of 18 episodes, was ordered by USA Network on April 16, 2010. This announcement came just over a month after the fourth season had completed airing. The season began in summer 2012. Jeffrey Donovan stated in a pre-season interview that one of the show's long-standing characters will die during this season.

Matt Nix wrote the first episode of the season, his twentieth credit for the series. The episode was directed by Stephen Surjik; it was his seventh directing credit for Burn Notice. Series star Jeffrey Donovan directed one episode as well, his second of the series and first since season 4.

Former CIA counterterrorism officer and whistleblower for the Agency's "enhanced interrogation" programme John Kiriakou claims to have served as a script advisor for the season following a chance encounter with Matt Nix on a flight.

== Episodes ==
No. overall	No. in season	Title	Directed by	Written by	Original release date	Prod. code	US viewers (millions)
81	1	"Scorched Earth"	Stephen Surjik	Matt Nix	June 14, 2012	BN601	3.87
With Fiona in jail, Michael has no restrictions as he chases the dastardly Anson, who tries to distract Michael by sending a troubled assassin with a special operations background to kill Madeline. Once she's safe, Michael secures support from Agent Pearce and the CIA, who now has Anson on their watchlist, as they corner him in a chemical plant. They almost capture him, but have to let him go after he rigs the place to a dead man switch, whereas Sam narrowly escapes when the plant explodes anyway. On the other hand, Fiona is interrogated by Michael's old nemesis, Agent Bly, and, despite her claims she acted alone at the British consulate, he pressures her to implicate Michael in the bombing.
82	2	"Mixed Messages"	Jeffrey Donovan	Alfredo Barrios, Jr.	June 21, 2012	BN602	4.09
To gain visitation rights with Fiona, Michael is reunited by the CIA with his training officer, Tom Card, who assigns Michael to bring down a major drug ring. When the approach reveals a cartel lawyer who knows Michael from a previous case (see: "Fight or Flight"), Jesse ends up being forced to go it alone, and he gradually works his way up the chain of command where he's able to force the number two guy to become a cooperating witness for the authorities. At the same time, Fiona is fighting off prison attacks, both from big-shot inmates and outside forces who extort another prisoner (Guest Star: Taryn Manning) to kill Fiona when she's on kitchen duty, but she survives and, with his mission done, fills Michael in at his first visit. On the family front, Michael's brother Nate returns to Miami after his marriage falls apart.
83	3	"Last Rites"	Nick Gomez	Ben Watkins	June 28, 2012	BN603	4.11
Pearce asks Michael to help her go after her fiance's killer, a CIA asset from a foreign country who's protected by information secured on his home computer. They team up with Jesse to follow the man on a cruise, creating a fake outbreak of a viral sickness and panicking his family in Miami into giving up the files. Meanwhile, after learning she's been marked for death, Fiona befriends the prison's chief distributor of banned goods to help her find out who's after her, and, once she does a favor for her new ally, she asks Michael in his next visit to go after a guard involved in the plot to kill her.
84	4	"Under the Gun"	Dennie Gordon	Michael Horowitz	July 12, 2012	BN604	4.44
Michael and the guys are tracking down the prison guard who's after Fiona, but things get more difficult when Sam is taken prisoner by the man's killer, a former spy named Rebecca (Guest Star: Kristanna Loken) being forced by Anson to do his bidding. While Sam works to shake her off, Michael and Jesse give chase, and are eventually able to convince her that they can work together to help her brother, who Anson is using as leverage against her. Along the way, Fiona asks Michael to track down a package for her new distributor friend, who needs it to keep from being thrown into solitary confinement, leading Michael to use force when her brutal ex-husband refuses to hand it over.
85	5	"Split Decision"	Scott Peters	Ryan Johnson & Peter Lalayanis	July 19, 2012	BN605	4.97
As the team's new ally, Rebecca explains that her brother, an informer on a small-time mobster, is on the run from the man's son, who blames the kid for his father's dying while imprisoned. While working to make the guy believe he has the wrong informer, the team slowly gains Rebecca's trust, allowing them an inside look into Anson's future plans. At the prison, Card comes to Fiona with a deal: he'll get her out, and protect her as a CIA asset, but she has to give up a former associate in the arms dealing business, so she calls on Michael after the guy refuses to meet with anyone else.
86	6	"Shock Wave"	Renny Harlin	Jason Tracey	July 26, 2012	BN606	4.86
With Rebecca's information, and full CIA support, Michael and his team follow Anson to Atlantic City to capture him once and for all. Nate tags along on the stakeout and almost messes it up, so Michael kicks him out, but he redeems himself when Anson leads the CIA on a wild goose chase and Nate's the only one close enough to make the arrest. Tragedy strikes, though, when an unknown sniper kills both Anson and Nate at the handoff, leaving Michael's mother despondent and his life shaken to the core. At the same time, Sam takes Barry to a beach house where he has stored important files for his clients, but armed mercenaries sent to kill Barry arrive before they can leave and trap them inside. While they work to get rid of the pests and escape intact, the British government comes to take Fiona, who's holding out hope that Michael is about to secure her freedom. With help from her distributor friend, Fiona evades the authorities to stall for time and is relieved when she is released into the arms of Michael, who says he needs her now more than ever.
87	7	"Reunion"	Craig Siebels	Rashad Raisani	August 2, 2012	BN607	4.32
Sam's rich girlfriend asks him to help her son, a skillful car thief being bothered by a ruthless loan shark. The team's investigation leads them into a gang war over a mobile drug lab, and, in the end, they just avoid getting caught in the crossfire. Meanwhile, with revenge on their minds, and Fiona newly freed, Michael and the team begin looking for the person who killed Nate, and their suspicions are raised when they find Rebecca has gone on the run.
88	8	"Unchained"	Alfredo Barrios, Jr.	Alfredo Barrios, Jr.	August 9, 2012	BN608	4.04
As he looks for clues to the person who killed his brother, Michael goes to the FBI for help, and they rope him into helping them take down a vicious Boston mobster. Taking another angle, Jesse and Pearce follow up on the gun sale that put the weapon in the hands of the killer, but, when it gets back to the CIA that they used blackmail, Pearce gets reassigned abroad as part of the deal to keep her job.
89	9	"Official Business"	Jonathan Frakes	Bridget Tyler	August 16, 2012	BN609	4.36
In her first assignment from the CIA, Fiona is tasked with helping a fellow asset, who is having trouble accessing information that will put a stop to a prospective black market buy. They're able to break into the seller's heavily guarded safe for the necessary information, but the asset unveils herself as a double agent in the process. Also, a lead on Nate's killer takes the guys to a security firm that trains mercenaries, so they pose as potential customers to gain access to the company's files, going off the books to find the man's name: Tyler Gray.
90	10	"Desperate Times"	Renny Harlin	Craig O'Neill	August 23, 2012	BN610	4.96
Along with help from the CIA, Michael and his team follow Gray to Panama, going to great lengths to fight through his security team and get him in CIA custody. Though they're able to pin him down, he informs them the CIA is coming to kill them and they narrowly escape, but now they're stuck in Central America and are on their own in getting home. In Miami, Madeline goes after Card for access to the file on Nate's death, completely unaware that he's gone rogue and is now trying to sacrifice Michael, too.
91	11	"Desperate Measures"	Stephen Surjik	Michael Horowitz	November 8, 2012	BN611	3.47
Looking for a way out of Panama, Michael and his team hijack a plane, only to discover it's being used by brutal drug smugglers for business. To get their plane back, the gang leader takes Michael and Gray hostage and tortures them. Card had convinced Grey that Michael was Anson's protégé, but Gray helps Michael escape, saying that a man who would suffer so much for his friends is “not the man in that file.” Gray joins the effort to bring down Card, telling him that Michael is dead. Stateside, the team calls on Madeline to find Sam's hacker friend and infiltrate an FAA office to hide the flight from the authorities.
92	12	"Means & Ends"	Ron Underwood	Jason Tracey	November 8, 2012	BN612	3.47
After the team returns home, their attempts to lie low are put in jeopardy when Fiona's prison ally, now out on parole, asks them to help her shake a dirty cop and his attempts to send her back to jail. They come close to making him reveal his corruption, but, after he suddenly develops a conscience, things come to a head in an explosive confrontation with the gang that killed his former partner. Meanwhile, they decide to use Gray to feed information to Card, who has assigned him with burning down the loft and bringing him Michael's files on Anson, but their meeting ends with both men murdered, Gray by Card and Card by Michael in cold blood for his deviousness.
93	13	"Over the Line"	Marc Roskin	Ben Watkins	November 15, 2012	BN613	3.17
In the wake of murdering Card, the CIA, led by legendary agent Olivia Riley, are hot on Michael's tail. With Sam in her custody, Michael and the rest of the team head to their storage shed to regroup and arrange an ambush, where they reclaim Sam and capture Riley as leverage for their escape. Despite their best attempts to convince her that Card was running illegal operations around the world, she will not be swayed and promises to hunt Michael down for his crimes. During all this, Michael tries to convince his mother to leave Miami so the government can't pit them against each other, but she is determined to stay.
94	14	"Down & Out"	Henry J. Bronchtein	Story by : Daniel Tuch; Teleplay by : Daniel Tuch & Matt Nix	November 29, 2012	BN614	3.14
In order to stay one step ahead of Riley, and leave the US, Michael and the team end up at the door of the resourceful Schmidt, who is being hunted by a former Syrian spy looking for one of Schmidt's clients. To get Schmidt's help for his team, Michael has to satisfy the spy's request while also protecting the person's identity, and he almost kills Schmidt in the process. Riley, on the other hand, goes after Madeline to find Michael, even as all the chaos causes Sam to consider sticking around and marrying his girlfriend.
95	15	"Best Laid Plans"	Nick Gomez	Rashad Raisani	December 6, 2012	BN615	3.16
Before receiving their new identities, the team helps Schmidt retrieve a high-tech alarm disrupter from his warehouse to cover his costs. When the gadget is seriously damaged amid a firefight at the warehouse, they work to patch it up in hopes that his buyer doesn't notice, and they just barely get the money when the buyer asks for a test run. Concurrently, with Sam back on the team after his girlfriend convinces him to stick with his friends, Michael asks his mother to find Barry so the team can keep Riley from discovering their plans to leave the country, but he's forced to include his mother in their escape when Riley captures Barry and threatens Madeline.
96	16	"Odd Man Out"	Marc Roskin	Ryan Johnson & Peter Lalayanis	December 13, 2012	BN616	2.86
In order to get microchip implants necessary for their new identities, the team helps Schmidt when the supplier, a rival smuggler (Guest Star: Kevin McNally), comes after him for revenge over a past botched deal. When he pins them in an abandoned warehouse, the crew improvise to salvage both their lives and the chips. Before leaving the country, though, Madeline insists on visiting Nate's grave one last time, despite the danger, and there Michael discovers a note from "a friend" fishing for a chat.
97	17	"You Can Run..."	Nick Gomez	Craig O'Neill	December 20, 2012	BN617	3.78
While working to gain passage out of the country via boat, Michael and the guys are ensnared by Riley and the CIA, with Jesse captured and Sam critically shot. With lives on the line, Michael and Fiona team up to keep Sam from bleeding out and to reclaim Jesse, who is being pressured by Riley to give up his friends. The duo are able to find Jesse and rescue him, but Sam is fading, so they rush to a recently disgraced doctor for the surgery needed to save him. Meanwhile, the "friend" turns out to be Bly, who meets with Michael to discuss Card's transgressions and offer Michael a deal to turn himself in, but he refuses and decides to remain on the run.
98	18	"Game Change"	Matt Nix	Matt Nix	December 20, 2012	BN618	3.78
After Riley sends a hit squad to take them out, Michael and his team track the assassins and discover Riley is teaming up with a drug cartel that Michael infuriated in the past. Recognizing the opportunity to clear his federal record, Michael contacts Bly to help document the proof of Riley's illegal actions, but has to change tactics when Bly dies at the cartel's hands. He pursues the cartel's boat and carefully works his way to the control room, where he ends up in a standoff with Riley, a close shave that ends when she agrees to confess to save their lives. Three weeks later, Michael's friends and family are still in CIA custody, until the day arrives when they are released, and Fiona is particularly shocked and disappointed when they find that Michael is back running special missions for the CIA.
