= The Good Guys (2010 TV series) =

- Genre: Police procedural Action comedy Comedy drama
- Created by: Matt Nix
- Starring: Bradley Whitford; Colin Hanks; Diana Maria Riva; Jenny Wade
- Opening theme: "Slink" performed by Locksley
- Country of origin: United States
- Original language: English
- No. of seasons: 1
- No. of episodes: 20

Production
- Executive producers: Matt Nix; Mikkel Bondesen; Zack Estrin
- Producers: Bradley Whitford; Mitch Engel
- Production locations: Dallas, Texas
- Camera setup: Single-camera
- Production companies: Flying Glass of Milk Productions; Fuse Entertainment; Fox Television Studios

Original release
- Network: Fox
- Release: May 19 – December 10, 2010

The Good Guys is an American action comedy-drama series about an old-school cop and a modern-day detective that premiered with a preview episode on Fox on May 19, 2010, and began airing regularly on June 7 of that year. The series stars Bradley Whitford as Dan Stark, a mustachioed, former big-shot detective with the Dallas Police Department, and Colin Hanks as Jack Bailey, a young, ambitious, by-the-book detective who has been assigned as Dan's partner because of his snarky attitude. On December 15, 2010, The Good Guys was canceled by Fox Television Studios.

== Characters ==
- Dan Stark (Bradley Whitford) is a former big-shot detective who once saved Governor Sanford Davis' son Andy, but is now all but washed up and spends most of his time reliving his glory days. However his hunches about the "bigger picture" of crimes and odd ways of doing his job still seem to get the job done. He is shown to have a friendly relationship with the criminals he has arrested. Series creator Matt Nix describes Dan Stark as being "actually a fantastic 1981 cop. He just hasn't moved along with the times. CSI stuff is like black magic." Stuck in the past, he has a difficult time adjusting to new technologies, such as "computer machines" and "smarty phones," also known to him as "cellular testicle shrinkers." Dan lives in a trailer located "in the shadow of" the Texas Star Ferris Wheel in Fair Park. He often retells stories to Jack of the old days with his former partner Frank Savage (Gary Cole), with whom he had a close buddy-cop relationship. These stories sometimes seep in, and Jack sometimes finds use of them to save lives of victims. He is reckless and unpredictable, and does not hesitate to use his handgun for any trivial matter, such as "using his service revolver to open a mayonnaise jar" and shooting a radio because of the loud noise, or even running through a $300 window to stop a dine and dasher. His overzealousness on a prior case cost him any chance of ever being promoted past detective. He enjoys eating peanuts with the shell on, listening to Foghat, and chewing gum.
- Jack Bailey (Colin Hanks) is an ambitious by-the-book detective whose attitude has made him few friends on the police force. He was assigned to "baby-sit" Dan on the Property Crimes desk after correcting the captain's grammar in front of the chief. He still has feelings for his ex-girlfriend Liz Traynor, whom he usually musters up the courage to talk to, and finds useful to obtain stuff such as warrants. Jack is usually calm-headed, preferring not to get his hands dirty at times when it is unnecessary. He admits to having attempted to grow a mustache to look tougher, but, because only the middle part grew, it looked like a "Hitler mustache." He gradually learns from Dan about the importance of a partner.
- Liz Traynor (Jenny Wade) is an assistant district attorney and former girlfriend of Jack. She apparently broke up with him because "she didn't want to date a cop", though it is quite obvious that the two of them are not over each other and continue to harbor romantic leanings, leading to rather awkward conversations and situations. After Liz realizes that her boyfriend Kyle was involved in a crime in "The Whistleblower", she breaks up with Kyle and decides to give another shot to a relationship with Jack.
- Lieutenant Ana Ruiz (Diana Maria Riva) is Jack and Dan's boss, who sees to it that they keep themselves and the police department out of trouble by investigating seemingly minor crimes. She is Dan's ex-partner and they had a one-time fling. She starts out being somewhat cold to Jack and Dan, but she helps the two out, and starts to rekindle a friendship with the two.
- Julius Grant (RonReaco Lee) is a petty criminal who used to run a pawn shop but is now a bartender. He is constantly getting in trouble, which Dan usually takes advantage of with a bribe in order to get him to play the role of a snitch. Dan believes that their relationship as detective and snitch is "a sacred bond", and does not hesitate to call on him when his criminal abilities are needed, whether for information or to act as a human tracking device. Though reluctant to help Jack and Dan with their dangerous and unorthodox plans, he often goes above their expectations to save them in times of need. Overall, he sees Dan as a true friend.
- Samantha Evans (Angela Sarafyan) is an offbeat and socially awkward assistant crime scene investigator. Though assigned to lab work, Samantha has a desire to do field work and jumps at the chance to help Jack and Dan with their cases, often without them asking for her assistance and doing some things illegally. Due to not following procedures, the evidence collected by Samantha often cannot be used in court, but it does lead Jack and Dan to the bad guys. Samantha has a romantic interest in Jack which he is completely blind to until a kiss in the Series finale. Jack does not feel the same way towards Samantha, but still considers her a good friend.
- Elton Hodges (Joel Spence) is a somewhat inept rival detective who holds a dim opinion of Dan's police methods. He was the first to jump at the chance to name Dan a criminal when he was framed. Despite the fact that he is next in command when Lt. Ruiz is unable to perform, no one seems to respect him. He also has a more "evidence before hunches" personality, which is why he does not like Dan's style of work, and often will insult others the first chance he can when what he believes he is right. He also seems to be a poor judge of character; he openly distrusted Julius despite him being a CI while unable to believe someone like a doctor could be a criminal. Though he often tries to insult Dan and the others, most of the time his insults make him look stupid.
- Frank Savage (Gary Cole) is Dan Stark's partner during their "glory days." He left the force after having a nervous breakdown. In the pilot episode, this breakdown is blamed on Dan, who persuaded Frank to leap from Dan's car when they were in pursuit of a car driven by the people who kidnapped the Governor of Texas's son. This same stunt was the reason Frank and Dan were "famous" compliments of a made-for-TV movie "Savage & Stark," hence Dan's "glory days." Frank now teaches Art at a Special Ed school and married to a domineering wife, Cynthia (Rachael Harris), though he, like Dan, still loves to "bust some punks." He'd named his oversized revolver "Stella."

== Production ==
The Good Guys was originally known by the working title Jack and Dan. For several months the series was to be known as Code 58, the Dallas Police Department code for "routine investigation", and then briefly as The Five Eight before producers settled on The Good Guys title. During the January 2010 Television Critics Association press tour, Colin Hanks jokingly suggested "Opposite Buddy Cop Show".

The title sequence uses the song "Slink (A Hymn)" by the group Locksley as the show's theme.

The first season was filmed primarily in Dallas, Texas, and made use of the Fair Park area as much as possible for its diverse shooting locations and so as not to disturb the residents. The show was originally planned to be set in Los Angeles until Dallas city officials convinced creator Matt Nix to set the show in Dallas. Nix said of Dallas, "It's a great city to jump on the hood of a car." Initially, the protagonists' mode of transportation is a mid-nineties Chevrolet Lumina, but during the course of the first episode, Dan Stark acquires a 1980 Pontiac Trans Am and uses it to great dramatic effect during the rescue of a hostage. By the end of the pilot episode, the new car has won the grudging respect of the uptight Bailey, and become the team's new vehicle. After the Lumina gets totaled in "Bait & Switch", it is replaced with a mid-2000s Ford Taurus, but Dan and Jack rarely use it as the team vehicle. Production work on the series began in January 2010 and principal photography of the pilot wrapped in early February 2010. Cast members spent time shadowing their real-life Dallas counterparts to prepare for their roles.

In May 2010, Fox announced that an additional seven episodes had been ordered for the show's first season, extending the initial run to 20 episodes. The show struggled with low ratings, regularly ranking in fourth place for its timeslot during the summer and then fifth place from October onward; hence, renewal prospects – despite the show's low production costs – were uncertain. Fox entertainment president Kevin Reilly said that although the network would not be immediately ordering new episodes of the show it had not been cancelled. The final episode was broadcast December 10, 2010, on Fox. On December 15, 2010, Robert Wilonsky of the Dallas Observer reported that Fox Television Studios, a production company for the show, informed the Dallas Film Commission that the show would not be renewed for a second season.

== Episodes ==
No.	Title	Directed by	Written by	Original release date	Prod. code
1	"Pilot"	Tim Matheson	Matt Nix	May 19, 2010	101
While investigating a home invasion and a stolen humidifier Jack and Dan stumble upon drug smugglers.
2	"Bait & Switch"	Matt Shakman	Rick Muirragui	June 7, 2010	106
Jack and Dan uncover a ring of classic American car thefts while investigating a broken window.
3	"Broken Door Theory"	Jeremiah Chechik	Kyle Long	June 14, 2010	104
A broken vending machine leads Jack and Dan to discover a prostitution ring and murder. During the fight scene, the full version of Creedence Clearwater Revival's "Travelin' Band" was played.
4	"The Dim Knight"	Kevin Bray	Tamara Becher	June 21, 2010	105
Some poisoned dogs connect to a vigilante.
5	"$3.52"	Steven Surjik	Matt Nix	June 28, 2010	102
A drug smuggler is released on a technicality because of Dan, and after an attempt to find evidence goes horribly wrong, Dan and Jack are trapped inside the back of truck, headed for a drug deal. After they try to escape they are caught in a four way gun fight, and Dan tries to save them with only his pocket change.
6	"Small Rooms"	John Kretchmer	Aaron Ginsburg & Wade McIntyre	July 12, 2010	103
Dan plants evidence out of boredom, and winds up in the middle of gun smugglers and a cold case.
7	"Hunches & Heists"	John Kretchmer	Ben Wexler	July 19, 2010	107
Dan and Jack realize that a bank robbery isn't a priority target.
8	"Silvio's Way"	Dennie Gordon	Zack Estrin	July 26, 2010	108
Dan goes undercover to finally catch the gangsters that escaped him in the past.
9	"Don't Tase Me, Bro"	Jonathan Frakes	Kyle Long	August 2, 2010	109
A hit is put out on a protected Federal witness after Dan accidentally exposes his cover.
10	"Vacation"	Sanford Bookstaver	Aaron Ginsburg & Wade McIntyre	September 24, 2010	110
After getting him and Jack suspended, Dan "borrows" $50,000 from the police to pay off Julius' loan shark, only to have the money end up being stolen.
11	"Common Enemies"	Peter Lauer	Story by : Matt Nix; Teleplay by : Adam Barr	October 1, 2010	112
Jack and Dan must help an arrogant forensic specialist during the investigation of a burglary; Liz gets in trouble during a prostitution sting.
12	"Little Things"	Jeremiah Chechik	Story by : Matt Nix; Teleplay by : Greg Hart	October 8, 2010	111
Jack and Dan discover two identity thieves forging documents for Mexican drug-runners while investigating a tip-off from a kid.
13	"Dan on the Run"	Adam Davidson	Rick Miurragui	October 15, 2010	113
The former governor's son (Ethan Suplee), whom Dan and Frank rescued back in their glory days, has been kidnapped. Jack sets out to prove that Dan has been framed for the kidnapping while Dan turns to Frank for help.
14	"Old Dogs"	Tate Donovan	Adam Barr	October 22, 2010	114
The police precinct remodelling is completed. Jack's con artist uncle Nate (Ed Begley, Jr.) later claims to have witnessed a crime and confesses to having a warrant for insurance fraud. Nate overheard someone talking about arranging a fire on Cedar Hill Lane, and the next day a house burnt down there. When Jack and Dan go to the house they find Samantha, the new lab assistant, investigating the scene, because she loves arsons. The neighbourhood is deserted except for one woman. Dan offers to personally protect her when she says that someone threatened and tormented everyone else who used to live there until they sold their houses. All of the properties were bought by the same company. When the lone resident describes Nate as one of the enforcers Jack, Dan, and Liz interrogate Nate, who confesses to working for Kenny (Method Man), the man behind all of the torture. In setting up a sting to bust Kenny, Dan inadvertently involves Julius as the intended target of Kenny's services. Nate attempts to steal the money that was being used in the sting.
15	"The Whistleblower"	Sanford Bookstaver	Aaron Ginsberg & Wade McIntyre	October 29, 2010	115
Lt Ruiz finds a peeping tom while getting out of the shower and files a report. Dan insists upon taking the case despite Lt Ruiz' objection. When Ruiz mentions she had come home from yoga, Dan believes it to be someone who stalks women at yoga classes and follows them home. While patrolling Ruiz' neighbourhood, Dan witnesses the assassination of a man in his home. Liz' boyfriend Kyle (Chris J. Johnson) invites her to go to a tropical island for some weeks. Dan relocates his trailer to Ruiz' house to be a better bodyguard. Turning to investigate the murder leads Jack and Dan to corruption at the oil company where Liz's boyfriend is an executive. When Kyle blows them off, Jack thinks that Kyle is involved in the corruption and a probable third victim after two other men from the company have been murdered. Aided by Julius, Ruiz apprehends the peeping tom. In recounting to Liz how the corruption case was solved, Kyle says he busted the punk while Jack hid in a closet (to hide the fact that it was himself who hid). Knowing that she is being lied to, Liz ends the relationship with Kyle.
16	"Silence of the Dan"	Jonathan Frakes	Kyle Long	November 5, 2010	116
Dan faints during the home robbery investigation of a recently divorced doctor. The doctor offers to run some tests and in the meantime Dan is assigned to desk duty. An office pool is started on when Dan will die. Lt Ruiz assigns Hodges as Jack's temporary partner. Dan makes a bucket list, which includes busting one more punk. Hodges insists that it is a simple robbery but Jack has a hunch there is something more to it because Julius informed him that everything else that was stolen could easily be fenced but dealing in stolen art is a lot more complicated. Jack asks Dan to talk to Liz about getting a warrant to search the doctor's insurance records. When the test results come back the doctor notices Dan's blood type and concocts a plan to steal one of Dan's kidneys to make some money. When Jack goes to the doctor's home to return the painting and ask some more questions he hears the Foghat ringtone that Samantha had put on Dan's phone the day before, frees Dan, and lets Dan bust the 'punk' doctor and his girlfriend.
17	"The Getaway"	Matt Shakman	Rick Muirragui	November 12, 2010	117
Dan is wanting to bust two more punks so that they can beat Hodges for the monthly tally. Jack and Liz go to a bed and breakfast for a romantic weekend without any work to distract them. After some suspicious behavior from Carson (Michael Weston), the owner of the bed and breakfast, Jack calls Samantha to do a background check on Carson. Dan overhears the phone call and comes to investigate. Samantha tells Carson's estranged wife Marion (Alicia Lagano) where he is thinking she is wanting to finalize their divorce. Liz heads for home when she realises that Dan is crashing their romantic weekend and that she is coming second to Jack's job. Jack and Dan initially believe that Carson's suspicious behavior is because of a money laundering investigation by the feds but when Marion and her brother arrive with automatic guns they learn that Carson was involved in an armored truck robbery a few months before. Liz returns to reconcile with Jack only to find Jack and Dan tied up in a burning out building. After rescuing them Liz tells Jack to go bust her some punks.
18	"Supercops"	Matt Nix	Matt Nix & Tamara Becher	November 19, 2010	118
While investigating a stolen car, Jack and Dan stumble upon a diamond heist. Meanwhile, Dan is upset by Jack's application to join the elite Strike Force unit.
19	"Cop Killer"	Sanford Bookstaver	Aaron Ginsburg & Wade McIntyre	December 3, 2010	119
Dan is investigated by the pompous, arrogant Internal Affairs Assistant Chief James Guthrie (Joshua Malina), who has a personal axe to grind. Jack and Dan are again suspended pending the outcome of the Internal Affairs investigation. Meanwhile, Julius is hunted down by the explosives dealers he snitched on thanks to the Assistant Chief Guthrie getting their convictions overturned on a technicality. With attempts to kill Julius inadvertently thwarted by Dan, the punks turn their focus to killing Dan first. When Assistant Chief Guthrie gets caught in the line of fire from the explosives dealers while pursuing his investigation Dan negotiates a favorable resolution to the Internal Affairs investigation in exchange for saving Guthrie's life. In busting the explosives dealers, Dan's home is accidentally blown up.
20	"Partners"	Stephen Surjik	Ben Wexler	December 10, 2010	120
Jack's former partner George Jenkins (Chris Klein), who is now the department deputy chief, gets involved when Liz's informant against a member of the mafia is murdered and it is believed a corrupt cop was involved. Dan's former partner Frank Savage (Gary Cole) also aids in the investigation.

== Broadcast ==
The show's summer run on Monday nights at 9:00 PM ET/PT ended on August 2, 2010. The Good Guys moved to Friday nights at 9:00 PM ET/PT along with reruns of House M.D. (Human Target was originally planned as the show's lead-in, but was put on Wednesdays after Lone Star was canceled), with new episodes resuming starting on September 24, 2010. Starting on January 1, 2011, the entire series was being rerun on Fox on Saturday nights at 11:00 PM ET/PT. However, the repeats were pulled on January 13, in favor of Fringe.

== Reception ==
=== Critical response ===
The Good Guys has an average critic score of 61/100 based on 20 reviews from television critics, yet it possesses an 8.3/10 user score, on the same site (Metacritic). Alessandra Stanley of The New York Times called the show "fresh" as well as a "buddy act" that is "silly in a clever and engaging way". John Crook of the Sudbury Star found the series "a refreshing blast of laughter and almost nonstop action" that "combines a sharp visual style with a time-jumping narrative". Nancy deWolf Smith of The Wall Street Journal enjoyed the show's "Lazarus effect" of an old-school cop in modern policing that successfully does the impossible by referencing "one of the most culturally lame eras in modern memory and making it seem shiny and new." deWolf Smith went on to say "its standout achievement may be originality." Maureen Ryan of the Chicago Tribune said, "It's not often that dramatic actors are asked -- no, required -- to ham it up, and Whitford does so with relish (ham and relish? Would it be going too far to call The Good Guys cheesy too?)." Ryan went on to say that the show that came to mind when she was watching the first episode was the late night satirical news show The Colbert Report.

Deseret News television critic Scott D. Pierce did not like the series, calling it "Very disappointing. Massively disappointing." Matthew Gilbert of The Boston Globe wished the series worked because there is "so much proven talent involved," however he felt "the hour drags." Jim McFarlin of Detroit's Metro Times did not find what he was looking for in the show. "With the economy still on the critical list and crime on the upsurge the notion of funny, drunk cops just doesn't play well these days." McFarlin compared the show to the American version of Life on Mars, an unconventional police drama which was cancelled after one season, and said, "If you're expecting another Burn Notice with The Good Guys, prepare to get burned." Hank Stuever of The Washington Post found that, "Like our own society, The Good Guys doesn't know when it is." Stuever went on to call the show "a throwback to the days when the car chase was more important than the lab analysis" and that it has "the tiniest whiff of satirical potential".

=== Ratings ===
U.S. Ratings
No.	Episode	Rating	Share	Rating/share (18–49)	Viewers (millions)	Timeslot Rank (Households)	Timeslot Rank (Viewers)	Timeslot Rank (18-49)	Ref.
1	Pilot	3.2	6	1.5/5	4.93	#4	#4	#4	
2	Bait & Switch	2.9	5	1.4/4	4.56	#4	#4	#4	
3	Broken Door Theory	2.7	4	1.3/4	4.29	#4	#4	#4	
4	The Dim Knight	2.7	5	1.2/4	4.24	#3	#3	#4	
5	$3.52	2.5	4	1.2/3	4.13	#4	#4	#4	
6	Small Rooms	2.2	4	1.0/3	3.42	#4	#4	#4	
7	Hunches & Heists	2.1	3	1.1/3	3.48	#4	#4	#4	
8	Silvio's Way	2.0	3	1.0/3	3.47	#4	#4	#4	
9	Don't Tase Me, Bro	2.3	4	1.1/3	3.59	#4	#4	#4	
10	Vacation	1.7	3	0.9/3	2.804	#4	#5	#4	
11	Common Enemies	1.6	3	0.7/3	2.484	#4	#4	#5	
12	Little Things	1.4	3	0.7/3	2.262	#4	#4	#5	
13	Dan on the Run	1.5	3	0.8/3	2.35	#4	#5	#5	
14	Old Dogs	1.5	3	0.6/2	2.309	#4	#5	#5	
15	The Whistleblower	1.5	3	0.7/2	2.354	#4	#5	#5	
16	Silence of the Dan	1.7	3	0.8/3	2.701	#4	#4	#5	
17	The Getaway	1.5	3	0.7/2	2.359	#4	#4	#5	
18	Supercops	1.6	3	0.7/2	2.662	#4	#4	#5	
19	Cop Killer	1.5	3	0.7/2	2.448	#4	#4	#5	
20	Partners	1.4	2	0.7/2	2.323	#5	#4	#5	
