= Burn Notice =

2007 American espionage television series

- Genre: Espionage; Action; Comedy-drama
- Created by: Matt Nix
- Starring: Jeffrey Donovan; Gabrielle Anwar; Bruce Campbell; Sharon Gless; Coby Bell
- Narrated by: Jeffrey Donovan
- Composers: John Dickson; Toby Chu
- Country of origin: United States
- Original language: English
- No. of seasons: 7
- No. of episodes: 111 + 1 movie (list of episodes)

Production
- Executive producers: Matt Nix; Mikkel Bondesen; Jeff Freilich; Alfredo Barrios Jr.; Terry Miller; Craig S. O'Neill; Jason Tracey; Ben Watkins
- Producers: Jeffrey Donovan; Craig Siebels; Erik Lee; Michael Daoust
- Production locations: Miami, Florida, U.S.
- Camera setup: Single-camera
- Running time: 42 minutes
- Production companies: Flying Glass of Milk Productions (2008–13); Fuse Entertainment (2007–12); Fabrik Entertainment (2013); Fox Television Studios

Original release
- Network: USA Network
- Release: June 28, 2007 – September 12, 2013

Burn Notice is an American spy action and comedy-drama television series created by Matt Nix. The show originally aired on the USA Network from June 28, 2007, to September 12, 2013. The show stars Jeffrey Donovan, Gabrielle Anwar, Bruce Campbell, Sharon Gless, and (beginning in season four) Coby Bell.

The show focuses on Michael Westen (Donovan), a former spy who was fired and cut off from the legitimate world by the agency he used to work for. Trapped in Miami with few resources, Westen takes jobs as an unlicensed private investigator while unraveling the mystery of who burned him and why.

Burn Notice received generally positive reviews from critics for its pace, its humor, its dialogue, and its combination of espionage and crime drama presented in an irreverent tone. In 2010, the series was the #2 cable scripted series by viewership with 6.7 million viewers, behind Royal Pains. The show also spawned a prequel movie and multiple tie-in novels.

== Plot ==
The title of the series refers to the burn notices issued by intelligence agencies to discredit or announce the dismissal of agents or sources who are considered to have become unreliable. When spies are burned, their connection to an espionage organization is terminated, leaving them without access to cash or influence. According to the narration during the opening credits, the burned spy has no prior work history, no money, no support network – in essence, no identity. The television series uses second-person narrative and frequent voice-overs providing exposition from the viewpoint of covert operations agent Michael Westen, played by Donovan. The voice-over commentary is in the form of tips for fledgling agents as if for a training or orientation film.

After being "burned" in the middle of an operation in southern Nigeria and subsequently beaten and kidnapped, Westen finds himself in his hometown of Miami, Florida. He is tended to by his ex-girlfriend, Fiona Glenanne (Gabrielle Anwar), a former IRA operative, but he has been abandoned by all his normal intelligence contacts and is under continuous surveillance with his assets frozen. Extraordinary efforts to reach his U.S. government handler eventually yield only a grudging admission that someone powerful wants him "on ice" in Miami. If he leaves there, he will be hunted down and taken into custody. If he stays, he can remain relatively free. Consumed by the desire to find out who burned him and why, Westen is reluctantly drawn into working as an unlicensed private investigator and problem solver for ordinary citizens to fund his investigation into his situation as a blacklisted agent.

Westen invites his old friend Sam Axe (Bruce Campbell) to assist him, while Fiona invites herself to join them. With the occasional assistance and sometimes hindrance of his mother, Madeline (Sharon Gless), Westen battles an array of criminals such as mobsters, gang members, con artists, murderers, rapists, kidnappers, foreign wet-work operatives, drug traffickers, sex traffickers, arms traffickers, and war criminals. At the same time, Michael must follow the trail that leads him to the people responsible for his being burned and later finds out why.

The series juggles these two narratives: the overall series dealing with why Michael was burned, and individual episodes focusing on the cases he works for clients.

== Cast and characters ==
The 2009 cast of Burn Notice (from left to right): Sharon Gless, Bruce Campbell, Jeffrey Donovan, and Gabrielle Anwar

- Jeffrey Donovan as Michael Westen: A former U.S. Army Special Forces operator working as an undercover contract operative for the CIA before he is burned (identified as an unreliable or dangerous agent) and now finds himself in his hometown of Miami, unable to leave. With his assets frozen, he is forced to live off his wits and any small investigative jobs he can find while he searches for answers about who has burned him and why. Highly skilled and extremely clever, he can think on his feet; often improvising electronic devices and using ordinary items ranging from duct tape to cake frosting in highly unorthodox ways to complete a job. He has two black belts, or as he puts it in one episode, "30 years of karate" and is "rated with anything that fires a bullet or holds an edge". He has an uncanny ability to assume cover identities and work in numerous regional dialects and international accents. Despite that, he cannot speak Spanish fluently although by the final season he demonstrates being capable of speaking and understanding Spanish, likely to maintain his cover while working in the Dominican Republic. He believes that his unhappy childhood, largely at the hands of an abusive father, has helped to make him into a natural covert operative, while also making close relationships difficult for him. He has a younger brother, Nate (Seth Peterson), who appeared in several episodes before being killed by a sniper in season six. Michael presents himself as a cynic hardened by experience, but occasionally reveals a soft, and sometimes vulnerable, side. He has a romantic relationship with Fiona. In the series finale, Fiona and he are living in Ireland raising Charlie (Nate's son) as their child.
- Gabrielle Anwar as Fiona Glenanne: A former IRA operative, she is Westen's ex-girlfriend. Fiona re-enters Michael's life when he is dumped in Miami as she decides to stay and quickly makes herself invaluable to him. Aside from serving as his firearms and explosives supplier, she provides support to him on his investigations, and at times, assists him in missions to find out who burned him. In the pilot episode, she speaks with an Irish accent. In the second episode, she changes to an American accent, along with a change in her style of dress, to distance herself from her past and blend in; showing her ability to adapt. She is a complement to Michael and his match in many ways, both intellectually and tactically. Series creator Matt Nix has said about Michael and Fiona's relationship:

The thing about the relationship with Fiona is...They are two people who really don't have anybody else they can be with. Anybody else is going to be afraid of what Michael does, and it sort of turns her on, and anybody else for Michael is going to be uninteresting. He is attracted to her, but part of what we explore over the first season is they really are attracted with each other, and yet there is a reason they broke up. She is an incredibly chaotic person who just thrives on disorder... Violence is foreplay for her.

Where Michael is concerned, Fiona is not entirely willing to let go of their past relationship, which continues to simmer. In the latter half of season three, the two of them are shown to be close to reigniting their relationship. As season five starts, the two move in together, but the tension in their romantic relationship remains. However, she is accused of the British Consulate bombings as the antagonist Anson Fullerton tricks her into confessing to a crime she did not commit. Anson uses this leverage over Michael and forces him to do work for himself. To remove this leverage, Fiona eventually surrenders and is arrested by the FBI as Michael watches helplessly.

- Bruce Campbell as Sam Axe: An aging, retired covert operative and former Navy SEAL, Sam is Michael's right-hand man and best friend. With a low amount of cash on hand to his name, Sam spends much of his time schmoozing rich, older Miami women in exchange for food, shelter, and nice cars. He and Westen are old buddies, and Sam is also Westen's last, tenuous contact in the official spy community. He presents himself as "the guy who knows a guy", and Michael frequently relies on Sam's seemingly inexhaustible list of contacts. Sam also uses the alias "Charles (or 'Chuck') Finley" frequently during jobs. In the pilot, he is also an FBI informant, reporting on Westen under duress. Knowing this, Westen can pass false information to the FBI through Sam, who is glad to become his double agent. At some point in the past, Sam foiled Fiona's attempt to sell a large shipment of weapons to a Libyan arms dealer, costing her a good deal of money. As a result, Fiona initially is very hostile toward him, but the two eventually become very antagonistic friends. Sam occasionally asks her for advice concerning his relationships with women, and Michael has said that the two of them make a good team.
- Sharon Gless as Madeline Westen: Michael's mother, "Maddie", is a chain-smoking retiree. Although attempting to keep a sense of gravitas and self-importance, she is family-oriented and fully supports both of her sons in times of need, as well as helping Michael with his clients. In the midseason finale of the third season, she considers leaving Miami but realizes her significance to his business. Until the events that start the series, she had only infrequent communication with Michael, noting in the pilot that Michael has missed his father's funeral "by eight years". During the first few seasons, Michael does not relish her company, but he gradually grows to appreciate her strength and love. Her appeals for help are Michael's one great weakness, and she can persuade him to do as she wishes.
- Coby Bell as Jesse Porter (seasons four to seven): A counter-intelligence expert unwittingly burned by Michael during a search for classified files on a terrorist about whom Jesse has information. Jesse comes to Michael for help, hoping to find and kill the people responsible for burning him, and gradually becomes part of Michael's team. He briefly considers killing Michael after discovering that Michael was the one who burned him, albeit unintentionally, but instead grudgingly continues to work with the team. He and Michael eventually reconcile. Though eventually reinstated after his burn is lifted, Jesse finds he can no longer tolerate the bureaucratic aspects of government work and takes a job with a private security firm while remaining a vital component of Michael's team.

== Episodes ==
Season	Timeslot (ET)	# Ep.	Premiered		Ended		TV Season	Viewers (in ones)
Season	Timeslot (ET)	# Ep.	Date	Premiere Viewers (in millions)	Date	Finale Viewers (in millions)	TV Season	Viewers (in ones)
1	Thursday 10:00 pm (June 28, 2007 – September 13, 2007); Thursday 9:00 pm (September 20, 2007)	12	June 28, 2007	4.0	September 20, 2007	4.8	2007	
2	Thursday 10:00 pm (July 10, 2008 – March 5, 2009)	16	July 10, 2008	5.39	March 5, 2009	6.1	2008–2009	
3	Thursday 9:00 pm (June 4, 2009 – August 6, 2009); Thursday 10:00 pm (January 21, 2010 – March 4, 2010)	16	June 4, 2009	5.99	March 4, 2010	4.32	2009–2010	
4	Thursday 9:00 pm (June 3, 2010 – August 26, 2010); Thursday 10:00 pm (November 11, 2010 – December 9, 2010); Thursday 9:00 pm (December 16, 2010)	18	June 3, 2010	6.62	December 16, 2010	5.11	2010	6.69 million
5	Thursday 9:00 pm (June 23, 2011 – September 8, 2011); Thursday 10:00 pm (November 3, 2011 – December 15, 2011)	18	June 23, 2011	5.17	December 15, 2011	2.89	2011	6.21 million
6	Thursday 9:00 pm (June 14, 2012 – November 8, 2012); Thursday 10:00 pm (November 15, 2012 – December 13, 2012); Thursday 9:00 pm (December 20, 2012)	18	June 14, 2012	3.87	December 20, 2012	3.78	2012	
7	Thursday 9:00 pm (June 6, 2013 – September 12, 2013)	13	June 6, 2013	4.32	September 12, 2013	4.97	2013	

=== Season 1 ===
The first season, consisting of 12 episodes, follows Michael Westen's investigation into the identity of the man who burned him. It also introduced the main characters: Fiona Glenanne, Michael's ex-girlfriend; Sam Axe, a former Navy SEAL and Michael's best friend; and Madeline "Maddie" Westen, Michael's hypochondriac mother. The season had many appearances by Agents Harris and Lane (Marc Macaulay and Brandon Morris), two FBI agents sent to keep tabs on Michael, who were eventually replaced by Jason Bly (Alex Carter); all are in turn removed from Michael's case. By the end of the season, Michael has discovered the identity of the man who wrote his burn notice, Phillip Cowan (Richard Schiff), only to see him killed. Michael later is contacted by a mysterious woman, ending the season on a cliffhanger.

=== Season 2 ===
The second season, consisting of 16 episodes, depicts Michael's struggle to discover more about his new "handler" and use her to get to the people who burned him. The season begins with Michael meeting Carla (Tricia Helfer), the woman on the phone from the previous season. He begins a professional relationship with her, which consists of Michael doing a series of different tasks. Despite Fiona and Sam's protests, Michael completes the task under the duress of Carla going after Michael's family and friends, which she demonstrates by breaking into Madeline's house several times and having his brother arrested. Meanwhile, Maddie begins getting closer to learning about Michael's secret life. While attempting to figure out Carla's plans, Michael is almost killed when his loft is rigged with explosives. Michael eventually learns that Victor Stecker-Epps (Michael Shanks), Carla's wrangler to keep Michael in line, was the one who tried to kill him. Michael captures Victor and discovers Carla had Victor's family killed as part of his recruitment and that Victor had enough evidence against Carla to use as leverage. By the season finale, Carla kills Victor and is ready to detonate his boat with Michael still on it. Fiona kills Carla, and Michael meets "Management" (John Mahoney), the leader of a professional black ops syndicate called "The Organization". After telling Management that he wants out, Michael leaps from a helicopter and into the ocean, effectively ending their relationship, as well as the "protection" that Management had secretly been providing for Michael.

=== Season 3 ===
The third season, consisting of 16 episodes, shows Michael in his quest to have his burn notice lifted. The season begins where the previous left off: Michael swims back to Miami, where he is met by Michelle Paxson (Moon Bloodgood), a Miami police detective who is intent on bringing Michael down. Paxson's sudden interest in Michael is the direct result of Management lifting Michael's protection. After he finally convinces her to stay away, Michael is approached by Tom Strickler (Ben Shenkman), an agent to the spies. Strickler claims that he can have Michael's burn notice lifted, but at a very high cost. Michael eventually must kill Strickler, instead, to save Fiona's life. In the meantime, Michael begins meeting Diego Garza (Otto Sanchez), a CIA agent who gives Michael information about his burn notice. However, after Strickler's death, Garza is murdered, and Michael is nearly back to square one. Later, Michael is confronted by Mason Gilroy (Chris Vance), a freelance psychopath who once worked for Strickler and confesses to the murder of Garza. Gilroy asks for Michael's help with an operation, and Michael, not wanting to let Gilroy get away with anything, follows. He discovers that Gilroy is attempting to break a high-risk felon out of prison. After Gilroy's murder, Michael learns the identity of the prisoner: Simon Escher (Garret Dillahunt), the man who committed the crimes for which Michael was framed. In the final scenes of the season, Michael is arrested and taken to a mysterious room.

=== Season 4 ===
The fourth season, consisting of 18 episodes, follows Michael as he begins working once again for the people who burned him. As with most other seasons, the fourth season begins immediately after the events of the previous. Michael, still in prison, is visited by Vaughn (Robert Wisdom), a high-ranking member of The Organization. He serves as Michael's new handler, bringing Michael various jobs and even participating in some. Over the events of the season, Michael inadvertently burns a spy himself, Jesse Porter, a counterintelligence operative. Michael eventually discovers their mutual target - a telecommunications magnate named John Barrett (Robert Patrick). After luring Barrett to Miami, Michael learns from Simon Escher that he made a coded Bible which contains a complete list of the people who burned him. Soon after, Jesse discovers that Michael was the one who burned him, causing a rift between them. Michael later is forced to kill Barrett to save himself, but loses the Bible in the process. Eventually, Sam and Jesse are able to reclaim the encoded Bible, and decide to give the list it contains to Marv (Richard Kind), Jesse's old handler. However, Marv is killed by Tyler Brennen (Jay Karnes), one of Michael's old foes. Brennen, now in possession of the list, hires another of Michael's enemies, "Dead" Larry Sizemore (Tim Matheson), to help track down the people on the list. Instead, Larry kills Brennen, which signals Michael's betrayal to Vaughn. Vaughn returns to Miami to have Michael, Fiona, and Jesse killed. However, Sam and Madeline are able to track down Congressman Bill Cowley (John Doman), whom Michael had previously strong-armed into helping protect a Cold War spy, to call for help. Michael is finally taken to Washington, DC, where he is met by an unidentified man (Dylan Baker) who proclaims, "Welcome back."

=== Season 5 ===
The fifth season, consisting of 18 episodes, begins six months after Michael successfully rejoins the CIA as a consultant. The man from the final scenes of the fourth season has been identified as Raines, and along with Max (Grant Show), Michael begins hunting down and arresting all the people on Simon's list of "Organization" agents. While pursuing the final man on the list, however, Max and Michael hit a dead end when they discover that the man is dead. This leaves many mysteries unsolved, perhaps forever, and these "inconsistencies" still consume Michael.

Michael continues to work under Max until the latter's murder, which was done in such a way as to frame Michael. Skillfully, however, Michael avoids the frame by both leading Agent Dani Pearce (Lauren Stamile), Max's replacement, away from the faked in-store security camera "evidence", and while simultaneously frenetically pursuing the actual killer through layers of "cut-outs". Michael eventually figures out that Romanian agent Tavian Korzha was the man who killed Max. Before he can confront him, however, Agent Pearce arrests Michael after seeing surveillance footage of his car leaving the scene immediately after Max's murder. Sam and Jesse intercept the convoy and convince Pearce to allow Michael to talk to Korzha while concealing a microphone.

After at last clearing his name by getting the killer to confess Max's murder to him - which Pearce hears before Tavian commits suicide, Michael finally comes face to face with Anson Fullerton (Jere Burns), the brazen and psychopathic mastermind who co-founded "The Organization" with "Management". Anson blackmails Fiona to get Michael to do what he wants. After Michael and his team are repeatedly forced to commit crimes and complete increasingly dangerous missions on Anson's behalf, Fiona turns herself in, freeing Michael to pursue Anson without concern for Anson's threat of her being arrested and going to prison.

=== Season 6 ===
The sixth season, consisting of 18 episodes, begins with Fiona's arrest. Michael does contract work for the CIA agent who trained him, Tom Card (John C. McGinley), to gain visitation rights to Fiona and eventually have her released. He is also working with Pearce, trying to track down Anson. The team finally captures Anson with the help of Michael's brother Nate, but shortly after the CIA arrives, a gunshot from an unseen location kills both Anson and Nate. Fiona is released from prison and helps Michael in his search for the sniper who killed his brother. Suspecting it was Rebecca, Michael and Fiona finally find her; when Michael gives chase, she shoots him near the right shoulder. Michael is wearing a Kevlar vest and is not injured; he returns fire, and shoots Rebecca in the left shoulder, injuring her, but she escapes on a hot-wired motorcycle. When Michael and Fiona return to the loft, they discover a trail of blood and find Rebecca waiting inside; they confront her, and learn that she did not kill Anson or Nate. Michael and Fiona eventually find out that the killer's name is Tyler Gray, and Card sanctions an off-the-books operation in Panama to take him down. However, when Michael finally captures him, Gray reveals that the operation is a sham: Card hired Gray to kill Anson and is planning a move that will kill Michael and his team. They escape, and Michael eventually confronts and kills Card, making every member of his team, as well as Maddie, targets in a CIA manhunt headed by Olivia Riley (Sonja Sohn). They consider escaping the country, but while trying to gain leverage on Riley, they discover she has been working with a drug cartel to bring Michael down. Michael gets in contact with Bly to help get evidence for Riley's treason, but their mission fails and Bly is killed. Michael eventually forces a confession from Riley while on a boat under fire from the Coast Guard. Sam, Fiona, Jesse, and Madeline spend about a month locked up, and when released, they find that Michael "made a deal" once more in return for his family and friends being freed from lifetime imprisonment. Fiona, upon learning that Michael has another person to answer to and more missions, feels betrayed. She reminds Michael he promised it would just be the two of them after this was all over. She backs away and tells Michael to leave her alone.

=== Season 7 ===
The seventh and final season, consisting of 13 episodes, begins with Michael receiving an assignment from Andrew Strong (Jack Coleman), a high-ranking CIA official with whom he made the deal that got his team and Maddie set free. Strong made the deal because he believes Michael is the only person he can entrust with a dangerous mission that involves thwarting an American named Randall Burke (Adrian Pasdar) believed to be running freelance terror operations. Fiona has moved on to a new job with her new bounty hunter boyfriend. Sam and Jesse continue to help Michael despite, or perhaps because of, intrusions on their personal and professional lives. Maddie, meanwhile, is trying to get custody of Nate's son, Charlie, to keep him out of foster care. Burke turns out to be part of a larger organization, and he sacrifices his life to help Michael rescue a woman whom Burke called "the key to everything": Sonya (Alona Tal). Michael and the team, including Fiona, begin working with Sonya to get deeper into her organization. As they do, Michael meets James (John Pyper-Ferguson), the man calling the shots for Sonya and Burke, and after passing some very intense tests, especially psychological, Michael is welcomed into James's "family". Michael soon finds out that James works for peace and justice in the world, but uses extreme methods to achieve his objectives. After Michael kills Sonya to protect Fiona, James sends his men to kill Maddie, Charlie, and Jesse. Maddie sacrifices herself to protect them and Michael shoots James, intent on taking him into custody. James blows up his own building, hoping to kill Michael and Fiona. They escape, but must be presumed dead to protect themselves. Strong releases Sam and Jesse, without imprisonment, and announces that Michael will "posthumously" be given a star on the CIA Memorial Wall. While Sam and Jesse contemplate continuing helping out those in need like they had for the past several years, Michael and Fiona have made their home in a small town in Ireland raising Charlie as their own and being the family Fiona had always dreamed of having, with Michael as her husband. As the show ends, Michael asks Fiona what he should tell Charlie when he is older. Fiona says Michael should tell him the truth, but Michael does not know where to start. Fiona tells him to start from the beginning, by saying, "My name is Michael Westen. I used to be a spy."

== Prequel and tie-in novels ==
Burn Notice: The Fall of Sam Axe is a prequel movie focusing on Sam Axe and is set before the events of Burn Notice. It was first broadcast on USA on April 17, 2011. It tells the story of Sam's last days in the Navy SEALs, leading up to his retiring to Miami, and serves as a lead-in to the fifth season of Burn Notice. Jeffrey Donovan directed the film and has a cameo appearance.

Since 2008, Signet Books has published a series of Burn Notice tie-in novels under their Obsidian brand:

Title	Author	ISBN	Publication date
The Fix	Tod Goldberg	0-451-22554-6	August 5, 2008
The End Game	Tod Goldberg	0-451-22676-3	May 5, 2009
The Giveaway	Tod Goldberg	0-451-22979-7	July 6, 2010
The Reformed	Tod Goldberg	0-451-23200-3	January 4, 2011
The Bad Beat	Tod Goldberg	0-451-23409-X	July 5, 2011

== Production ==
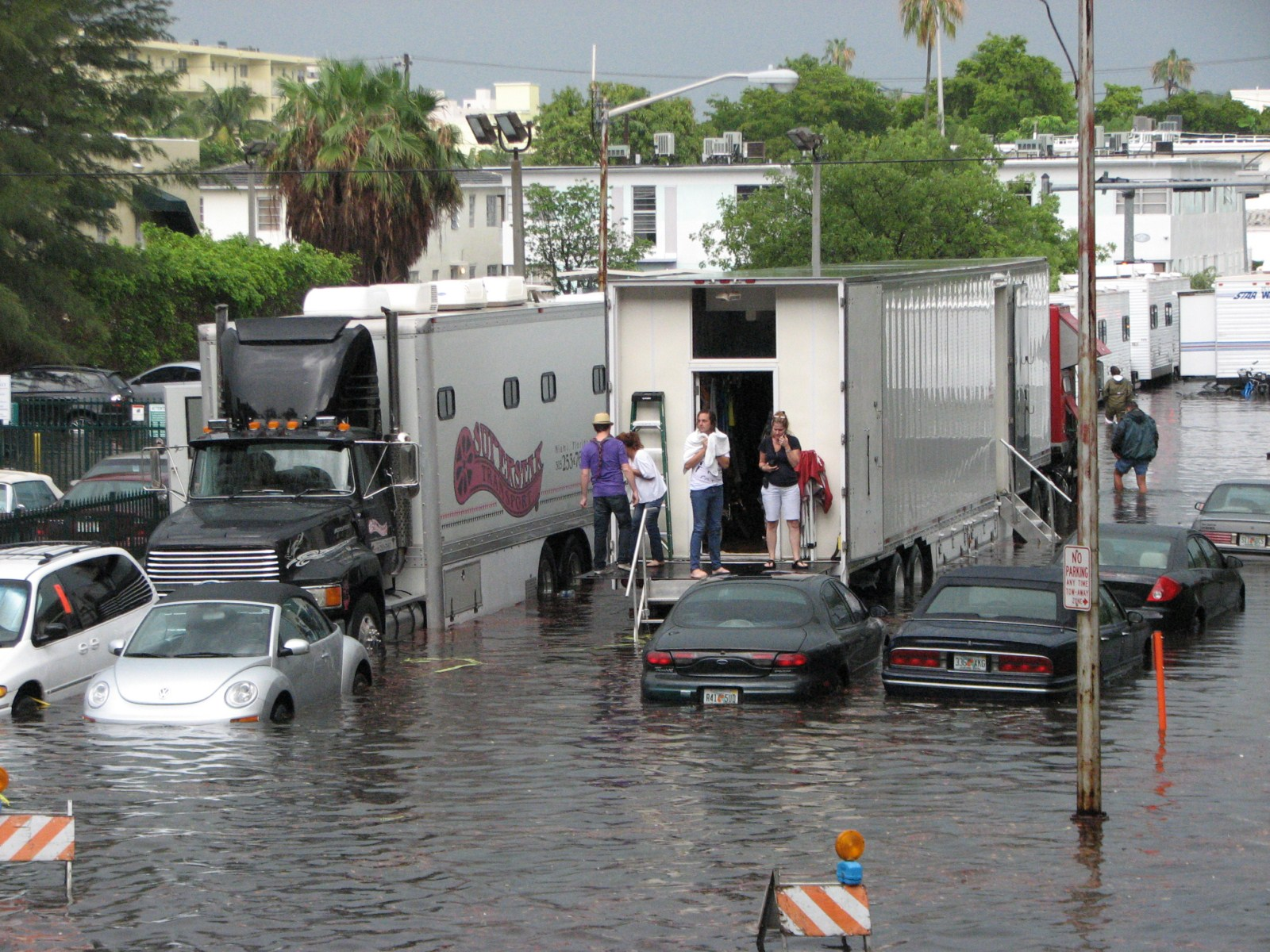
Burn Notice film crew in a flooded Miami Beach in 2009

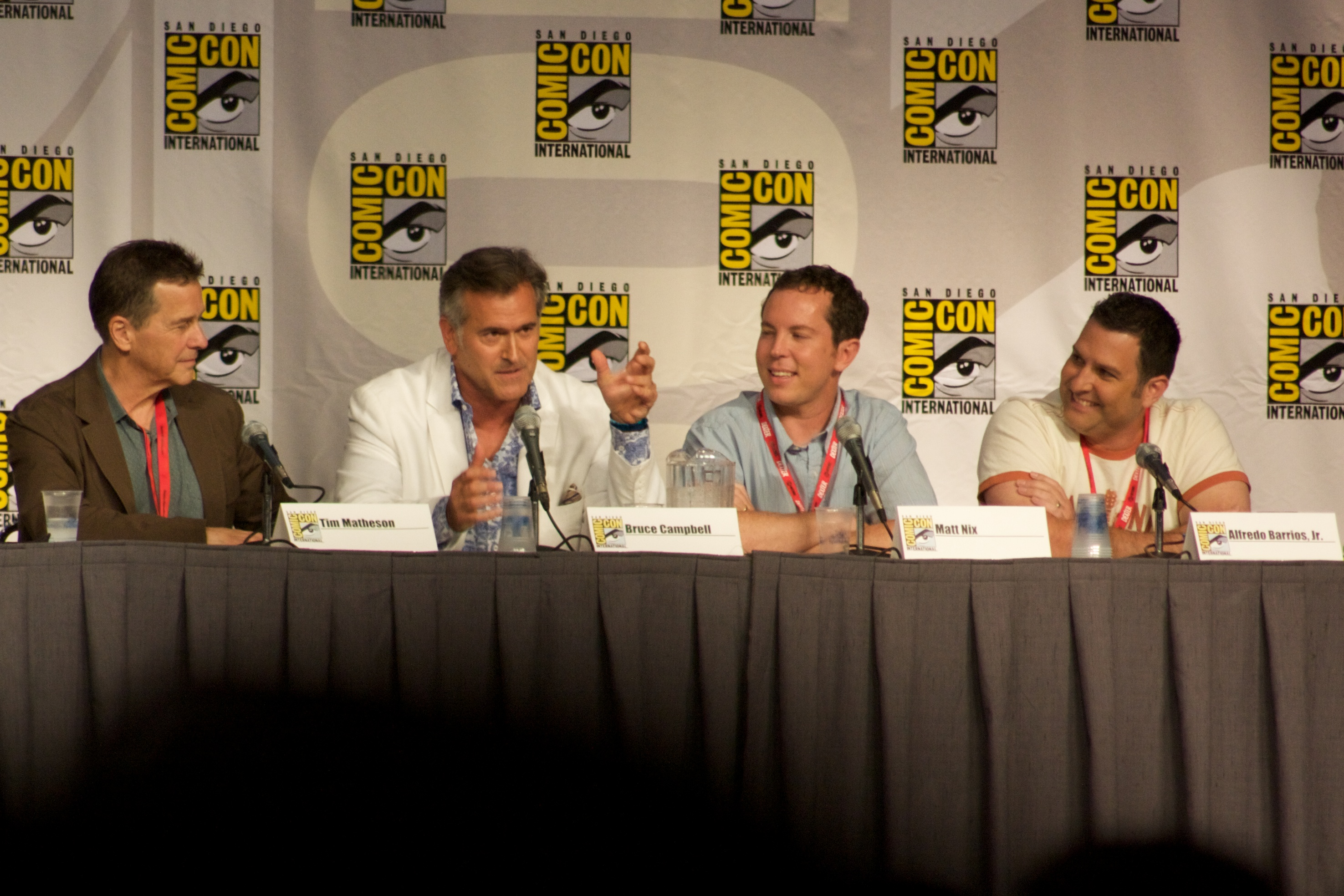
Burn Notice director Tim Matheson, actor Bruce Campbell, creator Matt Nix, and screenwriter Alfredo Barrios Jr. at San Diego Comic-Con 2010

The show was filmed on location in and around Miami. The show had a permanent set built in the former Coconut Grove Convention Center in Miami's Coconut Grove neighborhood, where most of the show is filmed. In August 2012, the Miami City Commission and Burn Notice producers reached a tentative agreement to allow Burn Notice to film at the Convention Center for one additional year, allowing for a seventh season of production in exchange for significantly higher rent. The set was torn down on August 30, 2013.

Michael's loft was originally located at 25°46'44"N 80°12'25"W.

Madeline's house was originally located at 947 NW North River Dr. Miami, FL 33136.

In a 2026 interview with GQ, former CIA officer John Kiriakou commented that he had met writer and showrunner Matt Nix on a flight, and had told him that he was a fan of the series, and that he had been curious as to who their script advisor was due to its accuracy, but one had not been credited. Nix then stated they never used a script advisor on the series. Following this meeting, Kiriakou became a script advisor for Season 6.

== Reception ==
The series has received positive reviews. As of 2024, Rotten Tomatoes rates the entire series 88%, with individual seasons rating as high as 94%. Critics praised the show's brisk and witty nature, succinct dialogue, and riveting combination of espionage and crime drama presented in a charmingly irreverent tone. Donovan's performance as the lead character also received praise for his likeably lighthearted, smart-mouthed, and vengeful spirit. Burn Notice has also been praised for its strong supporting cast members, slick production values, intriguing narrative, and dry comedic humor.

== Awards and nominations ==
The pilot episode written by Matt Nix won a 2008 Edgar Allan Poe Award, honoring the best in mystery, in the category "Best Television Episode Teleplay". Raines, Clements, and Sherry Klein were also nominated for Outstanding Sound Mixing for a Comedy or Drama Series for Burn Notice at the 60th Primetime Emmy Awards in 2008. Composer John Dickson won the 2008 and 2009 ASCAP Film and Television Music Awards for Top TV Series. Craig S. O'Neill and Jason Tracey were nominated for a 2009 Writers Guild of America, USA award for Episodic Drama (episode "Double Booked"). In 2010, the show received its first Emmy Award nomination for acting, as Sharon Gless was nominated for an Emmy in the category of Outstanding Supporting Actress in a Drama. In 2011, David Raines, Scott Clements, and Sherry Klein were nominated for Outstanding Sound Mixing for a Comedy or Drama Series for "Last Stand" at the 63rd Primetime Emmy Awards. Burn Notice has also been nominated for Favorite TV Obsession at the 37th Peoples Choice Awards.

== Syndication ==
Over the years, the show was syndicated on MyNetworkTV from 2010 to 2012. Ion Television also acquired the rights for syndication of Burn Notice in 2013 along with White Collar. This was the fourth USA Network television series to be in syndication on Ion Television, along with Monk and Psych.

== Home media ==
20th Century Fox has released all seven seasons of Burn Notice on DVD in Region 1. Season two was also released on Blu-ray. The TV movie The Fall of Sam Axe has also been released on DVD and Blu-ray.

DVD name	Ep #	Release date	Additional information
Season 1	12	June 17, 2008	Audio commentaries; Gag reel; Audition footage; Characters montage; Girls Gone Burn Notice montage; Action scenes montage
Season 2	16	June 16, 2009	Audio commentaries; Gag reel; Deleted scenes; Behind-the-scenes featurette
Season 3	16	June 1, 2010	Smash, Crash, Boom: Inside the Burn Notice Stunt Unit; 2009 San Diego Comic-Con
Season 4	18	June 7, 2011	The Stunts of Burn Notice; Burn Notice Roasts White Collar; White Collar Roasts Burn Notice; Sam Axe's Guide to Ladies and Libations; Rivalry of the Writer's Room; White Collar Pilot
The Fall of Sam Axe	Movie	July 26, 2011	Prequel set two years before Burn Notice season 1; Extended version of feature never before seen on TV; The Fall of Jeffrey Donovan; Audio Commentary; Deleted Scenes
Season 5	18	June 5, 2012	Army of One Extended Episode; Deleted Scenes; The Villains of Burn Notice Featurette; Gag Reel; Commentary on Fail Safe
Season 6	18	June 11, 2013	Deleted Scenes; Commentary on "Shock Wave"; Gag Reel; Matt Nix Gets Burned
Season 7	13	December 17, 2013	Deleted Scenes; Commentary on "Forget Me Not"; Gag Reel; Final Mission: Ending the Series
The Complete Series	111	December 17, 2013	Contains all seven seasons and all bonus features from the individual DVD releases.

== See also ==
- Action comedy § TV series
