= Wetwork =

Euphemism for murder or assassination

Wetwork (Russian: мокрое дело, romanized: mokroye delo), (colloquial: Russian: мокруха, romanized: mokrukha) is a euphemism for murder or assassination that alludes to spilling blood. The expression and the similar wet job, wet affair, or wet operation are all calques of Russian terms for such activities and can be traced to criminal slang from at least the 19th century and originally meant robbery that involved murder or the spilling of blood.

The operations are reputed to have been handled by the CIA and by the KGB's SpecBureau 13 (Spets Byuro 13), known as the "Department of Wet Affairs" (Otdel mokrykh del), or "Department 13".

== See also ==
- Black operation
- I Heard You Paint Houses, the titular euphemism similarly refers to a hitman
