= Matt Nix =

American writer, producer, and director (born 1971)

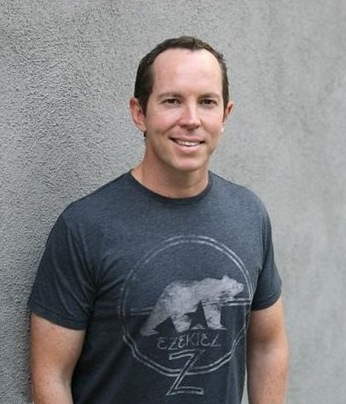
- Nix in November 2011
- Born: Matthew E. Nix; September 4, 1971 (age 55); Los Angeles, California, United States
- Education: UCLA
- Occupations: Screenwriter, television writer
- Spouse: Melinda Stahl
- Writing career
- Language: English
- Period: 1997–present
- Notable works: Burn Notice; The Good Guys; The Gifted

Matthew E. Nix (born September 4, 1971) is an American writer, producer, and director. He is best known for creating the television series Burn Notice, The Good Guys, and The Gifted.

== Early life and education ==
Nix was born in Los Angeles, California, to Phillip and Susan Nix, and graduated from Analy High School in Sebastopol. A graduate of the University of California, Los Angeles (UCLA), he was a UCLA Alumni Scholar.

== Career ==
=== Burn Notice ===
In summer 2006, Matt Nix created Burn Notice, a TV series whose title refers to the burn notices issued by intelligence agencies, which discredit or announce the dismissal of agents or sources. The television series follows agent Michael Westen (played by Jeffrey Donovan), who is abandoned by all his normal intelligence contacts. Not knowing why he has been "burned", he begins to work as a freelance spy and investigator as he tries to find out what happened.

The series premiered on USA Network on Thursday, June 28, 2007. It co-starred Gabrielle Anwar as Fiona Glenanne (Westen's "trigger-happy ex-girlfriend"), Bruce Campbell as Sam Axe (an old friend who "used to inform on" Westen to the Federal Bureau of Investigation), Sharon Gless as Madeline Westen (Michael's mother), and as of season four Coby Bell as Jesse Porter (a spy Westen accidentally burned). During production of its fourth season in early 2010, it was announced that the series had been renewed for two more seasons. It ultimately ran for seven seasons.

On the final episode, Nix had a cameo appearance as a news reporter. He also had a voice cameo in the pilot, as he is the voice that says "We've got a burn notice on you. You're blacklisted."—which then went on to appear in the opening sequence of every episode. The series ended on September 12, 2013. Between seasons four and five, a Burn Notice movie, entitled Burn Notice: The Fall of Sam Axe, was aired on USA Network. Written and executive-produced by Nix, the movie portrayed character Sam Axe's final mission as a U.S. Navy SEAL.

=== The Good Guys ===
In early 2010, Nix began working on The Good Guys, a series which premiered on Fox on May 19, 2010. The series starred Bradley Whitford as Dan Stark, a mustachioed, former big-shot detective with the Dallas Police Department, and Colin Hanks as Jack Bailey, a young, ambitious, by-the-book detective who has been assigned as Dan's partner because of his snarky attitude.

The Good Guys was originally known by the working title Jack and Dan. For several months, the series was to be known as Code 58, the Dallas Police Department code for "routine investigation", and then briefly as The Five Eight before producers settled on The Good Guys title. The show struggled with low ratings, regularly ranking in fourth place for its timeslot during the summer and then fifth place from October onward. The final episode to air was broadcast December 10, 2010, on Fox.

On December 15, 2010, Fox Television Studios, the production company for the show, informed the Dallas Film Commission that the show would not be renewed for a second season.

== Personal life ==
He is married to Melinda Stahl.

He has three children, including youngest son Mateo.

== Filmography ==
Short film

Year	Title	Director	Writer	Producer
1997	Chekhov's Gun	Yes	Yes	No
1997	Mike Feeny's Secret for Success	Yes	Yes	No
1998	First Prince	Yes	Yes	No
1999	Me and the Big Guy	Yes	Yes	Yes
2002	Mementoke	Yes	Yes	No
2004	Singularity	Yes	No	No
2017	There Shall Come Angels	Yes	Yes	No

TV series

Year	Title	Creator	Director	Executive producer	Writer	Notes
2010	The Good Guys	Yes	Yes (1)	Yes (4)	Yes	
2007–2013	Burn Notice	Yes	Yes (5)	Yes	Yes (24)	
2011	Burn Notice: The Fall of Sam Axe	—N/a	No	Yes	Yes	Television film
2015	The Comedians	developer	No	Yes	Yes (2)	
2015	Complications	Yes	Yes (2)	Yes	Yes (4)	
2017	APB	developer	No	Yes	Yes (3)	
2017	Ben 10	No	No	No	Yes (1)	
2017–2019	The Gifted	Yes	No	Yes	Yes (5)	
2021	Turner & Hooch	Yes	No	Yes	Yes (6)	
2023	True Lies	Yes	No	Yes	Yes (13)	
2027	Baywatch	No	No	Yes	Yes	
