= Coby Bell =

American actor (born 1975)

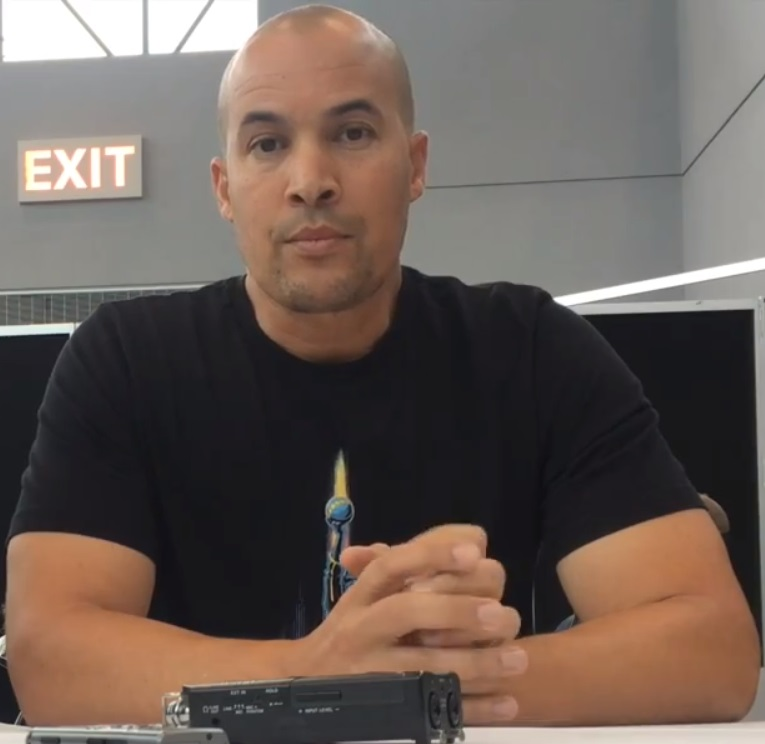
- Bell at the 2017 New York Comic Con
- Born: Coby Scott Bell; May 11, 1975 (age 51); Orange County, California, U.S.
- Other names: Colby Bell, Cobins Robins Rue
- Education: San Jose State University
- Occupations: Actor; musician; songwriter
- Years active: 1997–present
- Spouse: Aviss Pinkney-Bell (2001-present)
- Children: 4

Coby Scott Bell (born May 11, 1975) is an American actor. He is best known for his roles as Jesse Porter on the USA Network original series Burn Notice and professional football player Jason Pitts on The CW/BET comedy-drama The Game. He also co-starred as Officer Davis from the Everett Police Department and as Aaron in the Amazon original series Mad Dogs.

== Early life and career ==
Bell was born in Orange County, California, to a white mother and a black father, Broadway actor Michael Bell. Before he began acting, Bell attended San Jose State University, where he graduated with honors. He began his career with a few minor roles in various shows including The Parent 'Hood, Buffy the Vampire Slayer, ER and Smart Guy, before landing a thirteen episode stint as Patrick Owen in L.A. Doctors.

In 1999, Bell landed the role of Officer Ty Davis, Jr. on the NBC drama Third Watch. He was one of only five original cast members to remain on the show throughout its entire six-season run on NBC. During the series' run, he co-starred in Safe, a critically acclaimed play co-written by Third Watch co-star Anthony Ruivivar. The play co-starred Third Watch actors Jason Wiles and Yvonne Jung. He appeared in a Third Watch edition of the American version of The Weakest Link.

In 2005, just months after Third Watch ended its run, Bell landed a recurring role on the UPN comedy series Half & Half as Glen Stallworth, a San Francisco firefighter who is originally set up on a date with main character Mona, but winds up falling for her mother, Phyllis (played by actress Telma Hopkins). Despite appearing in only three episodes, Bell's character was mentioned and referenced throughout the show's fourth and final season.

In 2006, Bell starred in and co-produced an independent film called Drifting Elegant. The project marked his debut as a producer. That same year, Bell guest-starred in an episode of the UPN comedy series Girlfriends in an episode entitled "The Game", which served as the pilot episode for the CW comedy-drama series of the same name. Bell stars as Jason Pitts, the captain of the fictional San Diego Sabers football team. He reprised Jason Pitts in a recurring role when The Game, which was cancelled in 2009, returned on BET in January 2011. In June 2010, Bell joined the cast of the USA Network series Burn Notice as former counter-intelligence agent Jesse Porter.

Bell played Agent Turner on the Marvel Studios series The Gifted from 2017 to 2019. In 2020, Bell was cast as Captain Larry James, a Texas Ranger Captain, in the CW western crime drama series Walker reboot.

== Personal life ==
Bell is married to Aviss Pinkney-Bell and has four children, three girls and one boy, who are two sets of twins. In addition to acting, Bell is also a musician and songwriter in a reggae band. He also serves as a mentor to underprivileged youths in the Big Brothers of America.

== Filmography ==
=== Movies ===
Year	Film	Role	Notes
2005	Dream Street		Credited as Colby Bell
2006	Drifting Elegant	Renny Lyles	Producer
2007	Showdown at Area 51	Jude	
2008	Ball Don't Lie	Dreadlock Man	
2008	Flowers and Weeds	Tyler	Voice role

=== Television ===
Year	Title	Role	Notes
1997	The Parent 'Hood	DeVaughn	Episode: "Father Wendell"
1997	Buffy the Vampire Slayer	Young Man	Episode: "Reptile Boy"
1997	ER	Brett Nicholson	Episode: "Good Touch, Bad Touch"
1997–1998	Smart Guy	Garret / Anthony Williams	Episodes: "The Dating Game", "Most Hated Man on Campus"
1998–1999	L.A. Doctors	Patrick Owen	Recurring role; 13 episodes
1999	A.T.F.	Agent Dinko Bates	Television movie
1999–2005	Third Watch	Officer Tyrone "Ty" Davis Jr.	Main role; 130 episodes
2005	Half & Half	Glen	3 episodes
2006	Girlfriends	Jason Pitts	Episode: "The Game"
2006–2015, 2021–2022	The Game	Jason Pitts	Main role (seasons 1–3, 6–9); recurring role (seasons 4–5, 10–11)
2007	CSI: Miami	Tony Decker	Episode: "Kill Switch"
2009–2013	Burn Notice	Jesse Porter	Main role (seasons 4–7)
2010, 2015, 2020	Archer	Conway Stern	Episodes: "Diversity Hire", "Three to Tango", "Bloodsploosh"
2014	Hot in Cleveland	Baz	Episode: "Auction Heroes"
2016	Mad Dogs	Aaron	5 episodes
2016	Cruel Intentions	Pascal Barrett	Unaired pilot
2017	The Quad	Mr. Briggs	2 episodes
2017	Hand of God	C.O.A. Remiel	3 episodes
2017–2019	The Gifted	Jace Turner	Main role
2019–2020	SEAL Team	Warrant Officer Glen Mack	3 episodes
2020	Lucifer	Sam Chavez	1 episode
2021–2024	Walker	Captain Larry James	Main role
2025	Poppa's House	David	2 episodes
2026	9-1-1: Nashville	Nick Turner	3 episodes
