= Jonathan Frakes =

American actor and director (born 1952)

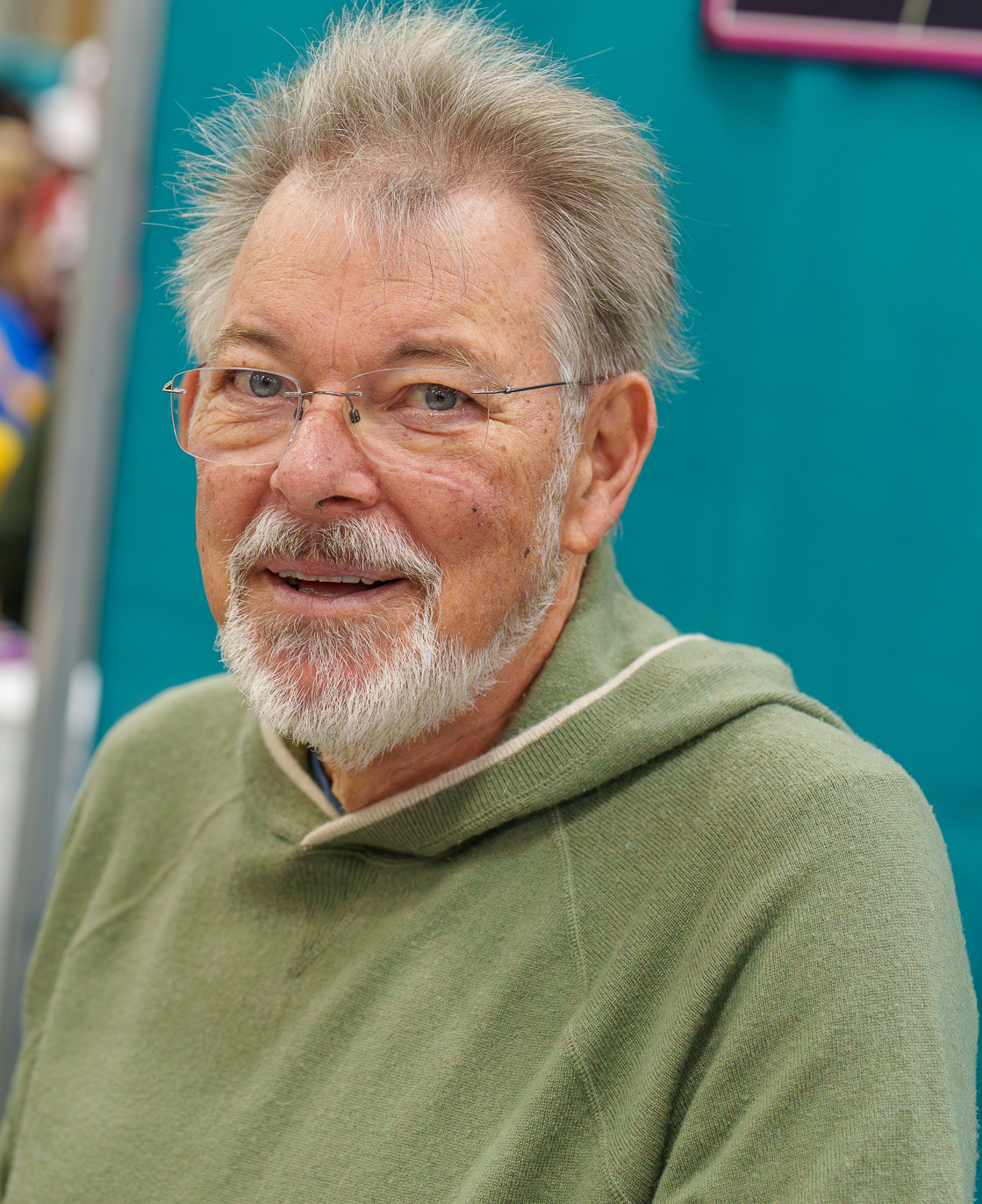
- Frakes in 2025
- Born: Jonathan Scott Frakes; August 19, 1952 (age 74); Bellefonte, Pennsylvania, US
- Education: Pennsylvania State University (BFA); Harvard University (MA)
- Occupations: Actor, director, television presenter
- Years active: 1977–present
- Spouse(s): Debralee Scott (div.); Genie Francis (m. 1988)
- Children: 2
- Relatives: Ivor Francis (father-in-law)

Jonathan Scott Frakes (born August 19, 1952) is an American actor and director. He is best known for his portrayal of William Riker in the television series Star Trek: The Next Generation and subsequent films and series. He has also hosted the anthology series Beyond Belief: Fact or Fiction, voiced David Xanatos in the Disney television series Gargoyles, and narrated the History Channel documentary Lee and Grant. He is the credited author of the novel The Abductors: Conspiracy, which was ghostwritten by Dean Wesley Smith.

Frakes began directing episodes of The Next Generation during its third season, and went on to direct the feature films Star Trek: First Contact (1996) and Star Trek: Insurrection (1998) and episodes of the later Star Trek series Deep Space Nine, Voyager, Enterprise, Discovery, Strange New Worlds, Picard, and Starfleet Academy. He also directed the feature films Clockstoppers (2002) and Thunderbirds (2004). He has since directed prolifically for television, including for The Librarian television films and series, Roswell, Leverage, Castle, and Burn Notice.

== Early life and education ==
Frakes was born in 1952 in Bellefonte, Pennsylvania, to Doris J. (née Yingling; 1926–2020) and James R. Frakes (1924–2002). Frakes's father was a professor of English literature and American studies at Lehigh University from 1958 to 2001, and was also a reviewer and critic for The New York Times Book Review. Frakes had a younger brother, Daniel, who died in 1997 from pancreatic cancer. Raised in Bethlehem in the Lehigh Valley region of eastern Pennsylvania, he attended Liberty High School in Bethlehem, where he ran track, played with the Liberty High School Grenadier Band as a trombonist, and graduated in 1970.

Frakes attended Pennsylvania State University, where he was a member of the Thespians and graduated in 1974 with a Bachelor of Fine Arts in theater arts. Although he had enjoyed performing in plays throughout junior high and high school, it was not until he entered Penn State that he began to take acting seriously. While he was working a summer job as an usher at the Festival of America Theatre, a director spotted him and suggested that he would make a great addition to his play's chorus. Transformed by the experience, Frakes immediately changed his major from psychology to theater.

Frakes then went on to attend Harvard University, where he became a member of the university's acting company, the Loeb Drama Center, and graduated with a Master of Arts degree in 1976.

== Career ==
=== Early work ===
For a time in the late 1970s, Frakes worked for Marvel Comics, appearing in costume as Captain America at conventions and other promotional events as well as for special appearances; he credits the experience in helping to hone his skills on interacting with fans on the Star Trek convention circuit. After graduating from Harvard, Frakes moved to New York City and became a member of the Impossible Ragtime Theater. In that company, Frakes did his first off-Broadway acting in Eugene O'Neill's The Hairy Ape directed by George Ferencz. His first Broadway appearance was in 1976 in the musical Shenandoah. Around the same time, he landed a role in the NBC soap opera The Doctors. When his character, Vietnam veteran Tom Carroll, was dismissed from the show, Frakes, urged by his agent, moved to Los Angeles, where he obtained guest spots in many of the top television series of the 1970s and 1980s, including The Waltons; Eight Is Enough; Hart to Hart; Barnaby Jones; The Dukes of Hazzard; Matlock; Quincy, M.E. and Hill Street Blues.

He played the part of Charles Lindbergh in a 1983 episode of Voyagers! titled "An Arrow Pointing East". In 1983, he had a role in the short-lived NBC prime time soap opera Bare Essence (which also starred his future wife Genie Francis), and a supporting role in the equally short-lived primetime soap Paper Dolls in 1984. He also had recurring roles in Falcon Crest and the miniseries North and South. Frakes appeared in the 1986 miniseries Dream West.

=== Star Trek: The Next Generation (1987) ===
In 1987, Frakes was cast in the role of Commander William T. Riker on Star Trek: The Next Generation. He was one of only two actors to appear in every episode (the other being Patrick Stewart). While appearing on the show, Frakes was allowed to sit in on casting sessions, concept meetings, production design, editing, and post-production, which gave him the preparation he needed to become a director. He directed eight episodes of the show and 21 episodes of other shows in the Star Trek universe. After the TV series ended in 1994, Frakes reprised his role in the Star Trek: The Next Generation films, two of which (Star Trek: First Contact and Star Trek: Insurrection) he directed.

Frakes has appeared in Star Trek: Deep Space Nine, Star Trek: Voyager, Star Trek: Enterprise, Star Trek: Picard and Star Trek: Lower Decks, making him the only Star Trek regular to appear in six Star Trek series. He has also directed episodes in six of the series (TNG, DS9, VOY, DIS, PIC, and SNW). Frakes is also one of six Star Trek actors (the other actors being Kate Mulgrew, Michael Dorn, George Takei, Avery Brooks and Majel Barrett) to lend their voices to the video game Star Trek: Captain's Chair, reprising his role as Riker when users visit the Enterprise-E bridge featured in the game.

=== After Star Trek ===
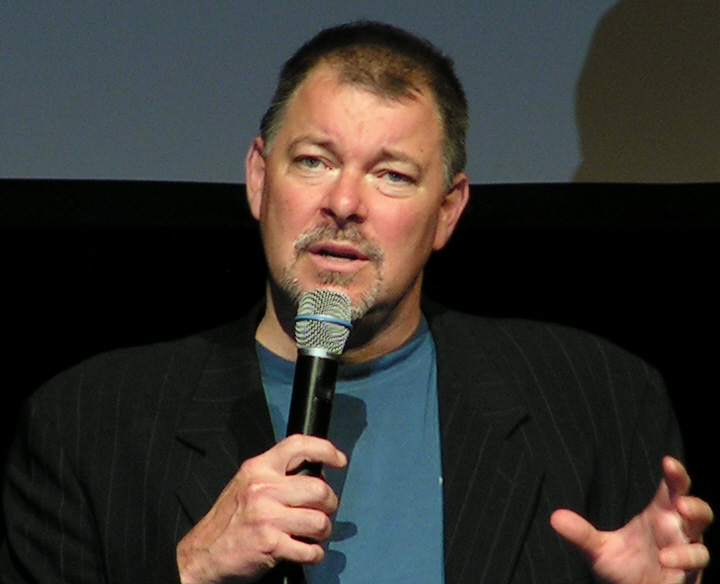
Frakes in 2005

Branching out from the Star Trek franchise, Frakes directed the 2002 family film Clockstoppers. However, his next film, 2004's Thunderbirds, was a box-office bomb, which he has said single-handedly almost destroyed what had been a successful directing career: "[My] name was taken off the lists ... I went from 60 to zero. It was a wake-up for me. I had been so positive, and so blessed, and so fortunate." It was several years before Frakes was given another opportunity to direct for television, and Thunderbirds remains his final theatrical directorial credit.

Much of Frakes's acting work after Star Trek has been animation voice acting, most notably voicing the recurring role of David Xanatos in the animated series Gargoyles, and he provided the voice of his own head in a jar in the Futurama episode "Where No Fan Has Gone Before". He had a small, uncredited role in the 1994 film Camp Nowhere. Frakes also voiced Finn the Human's adult version in the episodes "Puhoy" and "Dungeon Train" on Adventure Time.

Frakes was an executive producer for the WB series Roswell, directed several episodes, and guest-starred in three episodes. His relationship with Star Trek is downplayed in the season 3 episode "Secrets and Lies", in which the alien character Max auditions for a guest role as an alien for Star Trek: Enterprise.

Frakes appeared on the 1994 Phish album Hoist, playing trombone on the track titled "Riker's Mailbox". Frakes would occasionally perform on the trombone during his tenure as Commander Riker, drawing on his college marching band experience. He was also a member of "The Sunspots", a vocal backup group of Star Trek cast members that appeared on Brent Spiner's 1991 album Ol' Yellow Eyes Is Back.

Frakes hosted The Paranormal Borderline, a short-lived television series on UPN, which dealt with the paranormal and mysterious happenings and creatures. In one episode, Frakes presented an interview of reporter Yolanda Gaskins with veteran astronaut Gordon Cooper, where they discussed the possibility of aliens having visited Earth in the past. He hosted seasons 2 through 6 of Beyond Belief: Fact or Fiction, which also dealt with the paranormal world.

Frakes and Francis appeared together in Lois & Clark: The New Adventures of Superman in the episode "Don't Tug on Superman's Cape" as creepily too-good-to-be-true couple, Tim and Amber Lake. He narrated the History Channel's That's Impossible.

In addition to Roswell, Frakes has directed episodes of Leverage, Castle, NCIS: Los Angeles, Burn Notice, Falling Skies and most recently Marvel's Agents of S.H.I.E.L.D., Switched at Birth, Hit the Floor, The Librarians, and The Orville. So far, The Librarians has been one of the most positively rated and recommended work of his out of the previous, following the debut film The Librarian and the Quest for the Spear.

Frakes works with the Workshops, the Waterfall Arts Center, and the Saltwater Film Society, all located in Maine, where he teaches classes on film direction. He has also previously taught directing and filmmaking courses at Rockport College, now called Maine Media College. He and Francis owned a home furnishings store in Belfast, Maine, called The Cherished Home, which closed in August 2012 due to her being too busy with her acting to spend adequate time at the store.

In 2026, Frakes with his Star Trek: The Next Generation castmate Brent Spiner, started a podcast, Dropping Names with Brent and Jonny.

== Personal life ==
Frakes and actress Debralee Scott met in the early 1980s at an exercise class in Los Angeles. They married after about a year and lived in a 2-bedroom house in Sherman Oaks, California. The marriage dissolved by 1986.

Frakes first met actress Genie Francis on the set of the television soap opera Bare Essence, and again while filming the mini-series North and South. After some encouragement from Kirstie Alley, they began dating in 1985. They were engaged in 1986, and got married on May 28, 1988. The couple have two children.

In 2008, they moved from Belfast, Maine, to Beverly Hills, California, and later to Calabasas, California.

== Filmography ==
=== Acting credits ===
Film
Year	Title	Role	Notes	Reference(s)
1979	Beach Patrol	Marty Green	Television film	
1994	Camp Nowhere	Bob Spiegel		
1994	Star Trek Generations	Commander William T. Riker		
1995	Time Travel Through the Bible	Himself / Host		
1996	Star Trek: First Contact	Commander William T. Riker	Nominated–Blockbuster Entertainment Award for Best Supporting Actor; Nominated–Saturn Award for Best Director	
1998	Star Trek: Insurrection	Commander William T. Riker		
1999	Dying to Live	Will	Television film	
2002	Star Trek: Nemesis	Commander/Captain William T. Riker		
2002	Clockstoppers	Janitor	Uncredited	
2004	Thunderbirds	Policeman	Uncredited	
2006	The Librarian: Return to King Solomon's Mines	Carl Potter	Television film	
2008	The Librarian: Curse of the Judas Chalice	Trombone Player in Marching Band	Television film Uncredited	
2011	The Captains	Himself/Captain William T. Riker		
2017	Devil's Gate	Sheriff Gruenwell		
2022	Catwoman: Hunted	King Faraday, Boss Moxie	Voice, direct-to-video	
Television
Year	Title	Role	Notes	Reference(s)
1977–1978	The Doctors	Tom Carroll		
1978	Charlie's Angels	Brad	Episode: "Angel on My Mind"	
1978	Barnaby Jones	David Douglas	Episode: "Stages of Fear"	
1978	Fantasy Island	Kirk Wendover	Episode: "The War Games/Queen of the Boston Bruisers"	
1979	The Waltons	Ashley Longworth Jr.	2 episodes	
1979	Eight Is Enough	Chapper	Episode: "Separate Ways"	
1979	The White Shadow	Basketball Player	Episode: "One of the Boys" (uncredited)	
1980	Here's Boomer	Philip	Episode: "Private Eye"	
1980	Beulah Land	Adam Davis		
1980	The Night the City Screamed	Richard Hawkins		
1981	The Dukes of Hazzard	Jamie Lee Hogg	Episode: "Mrs. Daisy Hogg"	
1981	Harper Valley PTA	Clutch Breath	Episode: "Low Noon"	
1982	Hart to Hart	Adam Blake	Episode: "Harts and Palms"	
1982	Hill Street Blues	Drug dealer	Episode: "Of Mouse and Man"	
1982	Quincy, M.E.	Leon Bohannon/Surgeon	2 episodes	
1982	Voyagers!	Charles Lindbergh	Episode: "An Arrow Pointing East"	
1983	Bare Essence	Marcus Marshall	Several episodes.	
1984	Highway to Heaven	Arthur Krock Jr.	Episode: "A Divine Madness"	
1984	Five Mile Creek	Adam Scott	Episode: "Gold Fever"	
1984	The Fall Guy	Connors	Episode: "Always Say Always"	
1985	The Twilight Zone	Single Guy	Episode: "But Can She Type?"	
1985	North and South	Stanley Hazard		
1985	Falcon Crest	Damon Ross	Season 4 Episodes 20 - 30	
1986	Dream West	Lt. Archibald Gillespie		
1986	Matlock	D.A. Park	Episode: "The Angel"	
1987–1994	Star Trek: The Next Generation	Commander William T. Riker	176 episodes – Also portrayed transporter duplicate Lt. Thomas Riker in "Second Chances"	
1988	Reading Rainbow	Himself	Episode: "The Bionic Bunny Show"	
1994	Wings	Gavin Rutledge	Episode: "All's Fare"	
1994	Star Trek: Deep Space Nine	Lt. Thomas Riker	Episode: "Defiant"	
1994	Journey's End: The Saga of Star Trek: The Next Generation	Host	Documentary	
1994–1996	Gargoyles	David Xanatos, Coyote, Alexander Fox	Voice, recurring role	
1995	Lois & Clark: The New Adventures of Superman	Tim Lake	Episode: "Don't Tug on Superman's Cape"	
1995	Cybill	Himself	Episode: "Starting on the Wrong Foot"	
1995	Alien Autopsy: Fact or Fiction?	Host/Narrator		
1996	Star Trek: Voyager	Commander William T. Riker	Episode: "Death Wish"	
1998–2002, 2021–present	Beyond Belief: Fact or Fiction	Himself	45 episodes	
1999	Roswell	Himself	Episode: "The Convention"	
2000	3rd Rock from the Sun	Larry McMichael	Episode: "Gwen, Larry, Dick and Mary"	
2000	Ghosts: Caught on Tape	Narrator		
2002	Futurama	Himself	Voice, episode: "Where No Fan Has Gone Before"	
2005	Star Trek: Enterprise	Commander William T. Riker	Episode: "These Are the Voyages..."	
2005, 2009	Family Guy	Commander William T. Riker, himself	Voice, 2 episodes	
2009	That's Impossible	Himself		
2009	Leverage	Patient in Neck Brace	Episode: "The Snow Job" (uncredited)	
2010	Criminal Minds	Dr. Arthur Malcolm	Episode: "The Uncanny Valley"	
2010	NCIS: Los Angeles	Navy Commander Dr. Stanfill	Episode: "Disorder"	
2011	The Super Hero Squad Show	High Evolutionary	Voice, episode: "The Devil Dinosaur You Say! (Six Against Infinity, Part 4)"	
2012	Leverage	Man at Consumer Products Safety Commission	Episode: "The Toy Job" (uncredited)	
2012	Castle	Richard Castle Fan	Episode "The Final Frontier" (uncredited)	
2013	Adventure Time	Adult Finn	Voice, 2 episodes	
2014	Hit the Floor	Hank	Episode: "Blow Out"	
2016–2019	Guardians of the Galaxy	J'son, TV Narrator, J. Jonah J'Son	Voice, 14 episodes	
2016	Miles from Tomorrowland	Grandpa Vincent	Voice, 2 episodes	
2016	Angie Tribeca	USCG Commandant Admiral Donald "Don" Van Zandt	Episode: "The Coast Is Fear"	
2016–2018	Future-Worm!	Steak Starbolt	Voice, 6 episodes	
2018	After Trek	Himself	Aftershow; Episode 11	
2019	Hot Streets	Father	Voice, episode: "Super Agent 2"	
2019	How to Sell Drugs Online (Fast)	Himself	Episode: "Life's Not Fair, Get Used to It"	
2020, 2023	Star Trek: Picard	Captain William T. Riker	12 episodes – Also portrayed a Changeling in "Dominion"	
2020–2024	The Ready Room	Himself	Aftershow; 10 episodes	
2020–2021	Star Trek: Lower Decks	Captain William T. Riker	Voice, 3 episodes	
2020	The Astronauts	Rex Dowd	3 episodes	
2022	Allegedly	Roger	Episode: "Money Supply"	
2023	A Biltmore Christmas	Winston	Television film	
2025	Star Trek: Strange New Worlds	Director	Voice, episode: "A Space Adventure Hour"	
2025	The Mighty Nein	Zeenoth	Voice, episode: "Mote of Possibility"	
Video games
Year	Title	Voice role	Notes	Reference(s)
1995	Multimedia Celebrity Poker	Himself		
1995	Star Trek: The Next Generation – A Final Unity	Commander William T. Riker		
2017	XCOM 2: War of the Chosen	Volk		
2023	Star Trek: Resurgence	Captain William T. Riker		
Web series
Year	Title	Role	Notes	Reference(s)
2023	Star Trek: Very Short Treks	Commander William T. Riker	Voice, 3 episodes	

=== Directing credits ===
Film
Year	Title	Notes	Reference(s)
1996	Star Trek: First Contact		
1998	Star Trek: Insurrection		
2002	Clockstoppers		
2004	Thunderbirds		
Television
Year	Title	Notes	Reference(s)
1990–1994	Star Trek: The Next Generation	3.16 – "The Offspring" (1990); 4.07 – "Reunion" (1990); 4.21 – "The Drumhead" (1991); 5.18 – "Cause and Effect" (1992); 6.09 – "The Quality of Life" (1992); 6.20 – "The Chase" (1993); 7.08 – "Attached" (1993); 7.14 – "Sub Rosa" (1994)	
1994–1995	Star Trek: Deep Space Nine	3.02 – "The Search, Part II" (1994); 3.08 – "Meridian" (1994); 3.13 – "Past Tense, Part II" (1995)	
1995–1996	Star Trek: Voyager	2.03 – "Projections" (1995); 2.07 – "Parturition" (1995); 2.13 – "Prototype" (1996)	
1995	University Hospital	1.3 - "Life and Death"	
1996	Diagnosis Murder	3.18 – "Left-Handed Murder" (1996)	
1999–2001	Roswell	1.07 – "River Dog" (1999); 1.19 – "Four Square" (2000); 1.21 – "The White Room" (2000); 3.04 – "Secrets and Lies" (2001); 3.08 – "Behind the Music" (2001)	
2002	The Twilight Zone	"The Lineman" (2002)	
2006	The Librarian: Return to King Solomon's Mines	Television film	
2007	Masters of Science Fiction	"The Discarded" (2007)	
2008	The Librarian: Curse of the Judas Chalice	Television film	
2009–2012	Leverage	1.07 – "The Wedding Job" (2009); 1.11 – "The Juror#6 Job" (2009); 2.04 – "The Fairy Godparents Job" (2009); 2.11 – "The Bottle Job" (2010); 3.02 – "The Reunion Job" (2010); 3.06 – "The Studio Job" (2010); 3.13 – "The Morning After Job" (2010); 4.09 – "The Queen's Gambit Job" (2011); 4.12 – "The Office Job" (2011); 4.15 – "The Lonely Hearts Job" (2011); 5.03 – "The First Contact Job" (2012); 5.05 – "The Gimme a K Street Job" (2012); 5.14 – "The Toy Job" (2012)	
2009	Dollhouse	2.04 – "Belonging" (2009)	
2009–2013	Castle	2.08 – "Kill the Messenger" (2009); 5.06 – "The Final Frontier" (2012); 5.20 – "The Fast and the Furriest" (2013)	
2010–2016	NCIS: Los Angeles	1.14 – "LD50" (2010); 2.11 – "Disorder" (2010); 3.16 – "Blye, K." (2012); 4.10 – "Free Ride" (2012); 5.02 – "Impact" (2013); 8.10 – "Sirens" (2016)	
2010	V	1.07 – "John May" (2010)	
2010	Persons Unknown	1.05 – "Incoming" (2010); 1.10 – "Seven Sacrifices" (2010); 1.11 – "And Then There Was One" (2010)	
2010	The Good Guys	1.09 – "Don't Taze Me, Bro" (2010); 1.16 – "Silence of the Dan" (2010)	
2010–2013	The Glades	1.08 – "Marriage Is Murder" (2010); 2.04 – "Moonlighting" (2011); 4.02 – "4.02 – Shot Girls" (2013)	
2010–2013	Burn Notice	4.14 – "Hot Property" (2010); 5.06 – "Enemy Of My Enemy" (2011); 5.17 – "Acceptable Loss" (2011); 6.09 – "Official Business" (2012); 7.06 – "All or Nothing" (2013)	
2011	Truth Be Told	Television film	
2011	Bar Karma	1.09 – "Three Times a Lady" (2011)	
2013–2015	Falling Skies	3.09 – "Journey to Xilbalba" (2013); 4.06 – "Door Number Three" (2014); 5.06 – "Respite" (2015)	
2013	King & Maxwell	1.08 – "Job Security" (2013)	
2013	Agents of S.H.I.E.L.D.	1.08 – "The Well" (2013)	
2014–2015	Switched at Birth	3.06 – "The Scream" (2014); 4.08 – "Art Like Love is Dedication" (2015)	
2014	Hit the Floor	2.03 – "Behind the Back" (2014); 2.04 – "Full-Court Press" (2014)	
2014–2017	The Librarians	1.04 – "And Santa's Midnight Run" (2014); 1.06 – "And the Fables of Doom" (2015); 1.10 – "And the Loom of Fate" (2015); 2.06 – "And the Infernal Contract" (2015); 2.08 – "And the Point of Salvation" (2015); 3.05 – "And the Tears of a Clown" (2016); 3.06 – "And the Trial of the Triangle" (2016); 3.09 – "And the Fatal Separation" (2017); 4.04 – "And the Silver Screen" (2017); 4.06 – "And the Graves of Time" (2017)	
2016	Powers	2.04 – "Stealing Fire" (2016)	
2017	Girlfriends' Guide to Divorce	4.06 – "Rule No. 155: Go with the Magician" (2017)	
2017–2019	The Orville	1.05 – "Pria" (2017); 2.12 – "Sanctuary" (2019)	
2017–2024	Star Trek: Discovery	1.10 – "Despite Yourself" (2018); 2.02 – "New Eden" (2019); 2.09 – "Project Daedalus" (2019); 3.03 – "People of Earth" (2020); 3.08 – "The Sanctuary" (2020); 3.12 – "There Is a Tide..." (2020); 4.06 – "Stormy Weather" (2021); 5.09 – "Lagrange Point" (2024)	
2018	The Arrangement	2.9 – "Truth" (2018)	
2019	The Gifted	2.13 – "teMpted" (2019)	
2020–2023	Star Trek: Picard	1.04 – "Absolute Candor" (2020); 1.05 – "Stardust City Rag" (2020); 2.05 – "Fly Me to the Moon" (2022); 2.06 – "Two of One" (2022); 3.03 - "Seventeen Seconds" (2023); 3.04 - "No Win Scenario" (2023)	
2020	The Astronauts	1.03 – "Day 3" (2020); 1.04 – "Day 21" (2020)	
2021, 2025	Leverage: Redemption	1.07 – "The Double-Edged Sword Job" (2021); 3.03 – "The Scared Stiff Job" (2025)	
2023, 2025	Star Trek: Strange New Worlds	2.07 – "Those Old Scientists" (2023); 3.04 – "A Space Adventure Hour" (2025)	
2026	Star Trek: Starfleet Academy	1.09 – "300th Night" (2026)	
2026	Stuart Fails to Save the Universe	1.05 - "Spoiler: Bert Gets Married"	
2026	Stuart Fails to Save the Universe	1.06 - "Spoiler: Corn Is Delicious"	
Video games
Year	Title	Notes	Reference(s)
1996	Star Trek: Klingon	Interactive film	

== Awards and nominations ==
Year	Award	Category	Nominated work	Result	Ref.
1997	Hugo Awards	Best Dramatic Presentation	Star Trek: First Contact	Nominated	
1997	Saturn Awards	Best Director	Star Trek: First Contact	Nominated	
1999	Hugo Awards	Best Dramatic Presentation	Star Trek: Insurrection	Nominated	
2013	Saturn Awards	The Life Career Award	-	Won	
2024	Saturn Awards	Best Supporting Actor in a Television Series	Star Trek: Picard	Won	
2024	Saturn Awards	Lifetime Achievement Award	The Cast of Star Trek: The Next Generation	Won	(Note: "The Lifetime Achievement Award is usually presented to an individual for their contributions to genre entertainment. Top luminaries like Stan Lee and Leonard Nimoy, Mr. Spock himself, have received this top honor. It's not new, but we extended this award to cover the entire cast of Star Trek: The Next Generation, due to its continued influence on the face of general television. It was originally doomed to failure since it was following in the footsteps of the original Star Trek, yet it carved its own identity, and its diverse cast was light years ahead of its time!" —Academy of Science Fiction, Fantasy and Horror Films)
