= Jordan Wall =

American television and film actor (born 1985)

- Born: Jordan Daniel Wall; March 22, 1985 (age 41); Clearwater, Florida, USA
- Occupation: Actor
- Years active: 1995–present

Jordan Daniel Wall is an American television and film actor.

== Biography ==
Wall was born March 22, 1985 as Jordan Daniel Wall and raised in Clearwater, Florida, where he attended Clearwater High School. After graduating from high school in 2003, Wall attended the University of Florida, where he was a member of Sigma Nu fraternity and Phi Sigma Pi. He was also a sports anchor on the student-produced WUFT evening news. Wall graduated with a telecommunications degree in 2007. He began a professional acting career with roles in independent films and cable television. In 2010, Wall made his first appearance on the A&E TV series The Glades as the nerdy-minded, forensics laboratory technologist Daniel Green. The show was cancelled after its fourth season. In 2011, Wall made his first broadcast network appearance in Harry's Law, playing a young, newly qualified attorney opposite Kathy Bates and George Wendt.

== Selected filmography ==
- The Sacred (2009): Jared
- Walk on Water (2009): Daniel
- Surviving Disaster (2009): Buddy
- The Glades (2010–2013): Daniel Green
- Harry's Law (2011): Connor Bertram
- USS Seaviper (2012): Lewis
