= Scarlett Byrne =

English actress (born 1990)

Scarlett Hefner
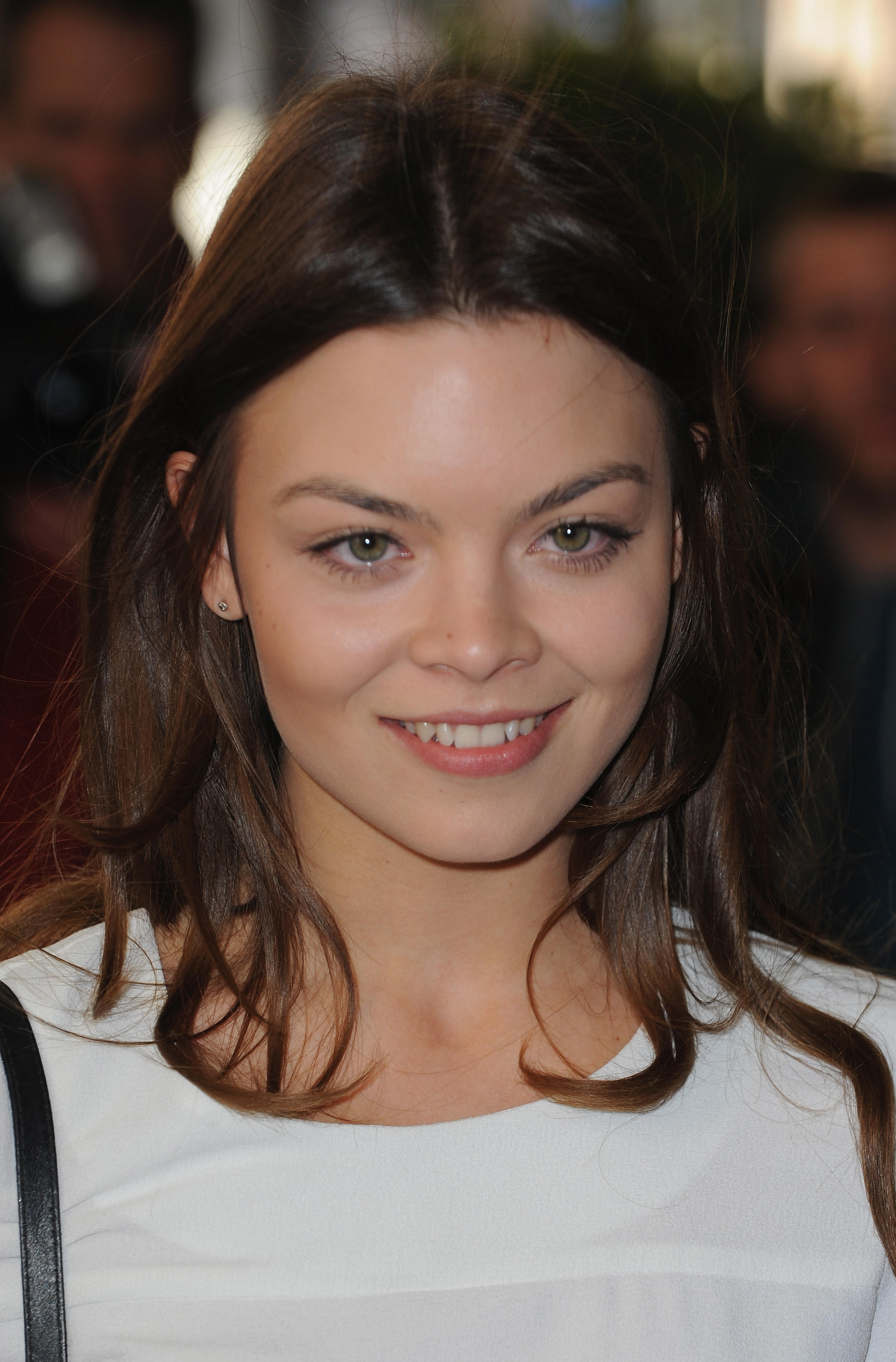
- Byrne in 2013
- Born: Scarlett Hannah Byrne; 6 October 1990 (age 35); Hammersmith, London, England
- Occupation: Actress
- Years active: 2005–present
- Spouse: Cooper Hefner (m. 2019)
- Children: 3

Scarlett Hannah Hefner (née Byrne; born 6 October 1990) is an English actress. She is best known for her roles as Slytherin student Pansy Parkinson in the Harry Potter series, and as Nora Hildegard in The Vampire Diaries.

== Career ==
Byrne began her acting career in 2005 in the short film CryBaby, before portraying Chloe Daniels in an episode of the British TV drama Doctors.

In 2009, Byrne was cast in the role of Pansy Parkinson in the sixth film in the Harry Potter series, Harry Potter and the Half-Blood Prince, before reprising her role in the final two films of the series. Following the end of the Harry Potter series, she played Brittany in Lake Placid: The Final Chapter, as well as appearing in several short videos written by fellow Harry Potter actor Jessie Cave for her website Pindippy.

During 2013, Byrne played the role of Sarah in the short film Lashes. Byrne became a regular cast member for the fourth season of the sci-fi show Falling Skies. She moved to Vancouver for the filming of Falling Skies. While she departs the series at the end of season 4, Byrne reprises the role in the penultimate episode of the series, "Reunion".

In 2015, she joined The Vampire Diaries as witch-vampire hybrid, heretic, Nora Hildegard. Byrne was a major recurring character in the seventh season of the series and appeared in twelve episodes of the season. The character was then killed off in the sixteenth episode along with her fiancé Mary-Louise. She also had a guest appearance role in an episode of the MTV comedy series, Mary + Jane.

In 2017, Byrne played the role of Lisa in the action-thriller film Skybound, alongside Gavin Stenhouse. In February 2017, Byrne posed nude for the magazine Playboy.

In October 2018, she joined Evanna Lynch and her partner Keo Motsepe on the trios dance in week 4 on Dancing with the Stars.

In 2019, Byrne portrayed Bronwyn, a witch in Morgan le Fey's coven in Marvel's Runaways.

== Personal life ==
In August 2015, Byrne became engaged to Cooper Hefner. On 4 November 2019, Byrne and Hefner announced that they had married. On 24 August 2020, Byrne gave birth to their first daughter. On 26 March 2022, she gave birth to twin daughters.

== Filmography ==
=== Film ===
Year	Title	Role	Notes
2009	Harry Potter and the Half-Blood Prince	Pansy Parkinson	
2010	Harry Potter and the Deathly Hallows – Part 1	Pansy Parkinson	
2011	Harry Potter and the Deathly Hallows – Part 2	Pansy Parkinson	
2017	Skybound	Lisa	

=== Television ===
Year	Title	Role	Notes
2008	Doctors	Chloe Daniels	Episode: "Kiss My Asp"
2012	Lake Placid: The Final Chapter	Brittany	Television film
2014–2015	Falling Skies	Alexis "Lexi" Glass-Mason	Main role (season 4); guest role (season 5)
2015	Sorority Murder	Jennifer Taylor	Television film
2015–2016	The Vampire Diaries	Nora Hildegard	Recurring role (season 7)
2016	Mary + Jane	Lacey	Episode: "Jenéeuary"
2018	Dancing with the Stars	Herself	2 episodes
2019	Runaways	Bronwyn	Recurring role (season 3)

=== Other work ===
Year	Title	Role	Notes
2005	CryBaby	N/A	Short film
2011	Pindippy	Various Characters	Web series by Jessie Cave
2014	Lashes	Sarah	Short film
2019	Stick and Poke	Maggie	Short film
2019	Stick and Poke	Herself	Special thanks: The Blank Theater's Young Playwrights Festival Actor's Workshop Consultant
