= Penn State Thespians =

Student-run theatrical organization

The Penn State Thespian Society
- Formerly: The Penn State Thespians
- Founded: October 22, 1897; 128 years ago
- Founder: Fred Lewis Pattee, John Leete
- Headquarters: State College, Pennsylvania, United States
- Website: psuthespiansociety.com

The Penn State Thespians, a student-run theatrical organization at State College, Pennsylvania State University, has the stated goal of 'presenting theatrical entertainment and providing students of the Pennsylvania State University with an educational experience in all phases of a dramatic production, thereby enhancing the cultural diversity of its members and the University

In the fall of 2018, The Penn State Thespians changed its name to the Penn State Thespian Society to comply with university regulations.

== History ==
The Penn State Thespian Society, previously known as The Penn State Thespians, is the oldest consecutive running organization on campus, the second oldest student-run organization on campus, after the Penn State Glee Club, and is the second oldest college theater organization in the country. The first Thespians meeting was called to order on October 22, 1897, by the founders, Dr. Fred Lewis Pattee (author of Penn State's “Alma Mater”) and Dr. John Leete. Dr. Pattee was the head of the Department of English, and Dr. Leete was a professor of Mathematics. Neither had roots in theater, yet they came together to form Thespians. This tradition continues today, as many members are amateurs not actively pursuing degrees or careers in theater.

The first show performed by the organization was The Rivals, performed on February 14, 1898.

== Notable alumni ==
A few notable alumni from the organization include:

- Gene Kelly: Participated in three shows from 1929-1930 before transferring to the University of Pittsburgh.
- Julius J. Epstein: Wrote lyrics for Thespians and went on to write more than 30 screenplays, including Casablanca.
- Oliver Smith (designer): Won Tony Awards for stage settings on Broadway productions of Brigadoon, West Side Story, My Fair Lady, Oklahoma!, Guys and Dolls, and Hello Dolly.
- Carrie Fishbein Robbins: Won a Tony Award for her costume design on Grease.
- Jonathan Frakes: Played the role of Commander William Riker in Star Trek: The Next Generation.
- Rick Lyon: Performed in and directed several shows in the late 1970s and early 80s. Best known for creating all the puppets and appearing in the original cast for the Tony Award-winning Broadway musical Avenue Q.

== Events ==
Some notable performances that the organization holds throughout the year include:

- Main stage: Thespians do one main stage musical each semester. They are performed at Schwab Auditorium. The shows are completely student-run and performed. Recent productions include Spring Awakening, Cabaret, Little Women, 9 to 5, The Addams Family, Sweeney Todd, Bright Star, and Something Rotten!
- Children's Shows: Each semester, Thespians create a children's show. Thespians choose a popular children's book and adapt it into play form. These shows are performed in downtown State College at Schlow Memorial Library. Thespian pledges are highly involved in these shows. Recent children shows include Eloise and The Lorax.
- MasquerAIDS: Thespians have performed a MasquerAIDS fundraiser every year since 2002. All profits from the show go to benefit AIDS Resource, an AIDS Service Organization serving Centre, Clinton, Lycoming, Snyder, Union, and Potter Counties.

== Becoming a Member ==
To become a member of Thespians, one must first start out as a New Member. This is a two-semester process in which one must fulfill certain requirements. This includes helping out with the main stage shows through the crew, set, and costumes, creating a pledge project, asking members questions, and creating a skit. New Members also have a "Big" to help them with their joining process.
