= List of The Glades episodes =

The Glades is a one-hour drama that ran on A&E from July 11, 2010, to August 26, 2013. The premiere was the highest-rated episode of an original series to be shown on A&E.

The show's premise involves a Chicago detective taking a South Florida job with the Florida Department of Law Enforcement, which he believes will afford a more relaxing lifestyle, but he finds things are more complicated than he imagined.

On August 31, 2013, A&E canceled The Glades after four seasons.

== Series overview ==
| Season | Episodes | Originally released | |
| Season | Episodes | First released | Last released |
|---|---|---|---|
| 1 | 13 | July 11, 2010 | October 3, 2010 |
| 2 | 13 | June 5, 2011 | September 5, 2011 |
| 3 | 10 | June 3, 2012 | August 12, 2012 |
| 4 | 13 | May 27, 2013 | August 26, 2013 |

== Episodes ==
=== Season 1 (2010) ===
| No. overall | No. in season | Title | Directed by | Written by | Original release date | Prod. code | US viewers (millions) |
|---|---|---|---|---|---|---|---|
| 1 | 1 | "Pilot" | Peter O'Fallon | Clifton Campbell | July 11, 2010 | BDF179 | 3.55 |
Chicago cop Jim Longworth takes a settlement payment and relocates to Palm Glade Florida, after being shot for supposedly sleeping with his captain's wife. He joins the Florida Department of Law Enforcement, where one of his first cases is investigating a headless woman found in a lake. By the time he proves that his supervisory officer murdered his own wife, Longworth has: pestered his golf partner – and medical examiner – Carlos; befriended a young forensics technician, Daniel; and developed a relationship with a nurse, Callie.
| 2 | 2 | "Bird in the Hand" | Peter O'Fallon | Matt Witten | July 18, 2010 | BDF101 | 3.35 |
While Longworth spends more time with Callie's son, he finds an abandoned airplane with a dead body inside.
| 3 | 3 | "A Perfect Storm" | Timothy Busfield | Alfonso H. Moreno | July 25, 2010 | BDF104 | 2.92 |
Longworth gets caught up in a murder investigation that appears to be a spree killing just as a hurricane hits Palm Glade.
| 4 | 4 | "Mucked Up" | Randall Zisk | Elle Johnson | August 1, 2010 | BDF102 | 3.29 |
The corpse of a businessman emerges from the muck in a sugar cane field days before the big football game.
| 5 | 5 | "The Girlfriend Experience" | Tim Hunter | Lee Goldberg & William Rabkin | August 8, 2010 | BDF103 | 3.10 |
Longworth gets a nightmarish call that Carlos has been found dead lying on a bed of fishes, but it turns out that it wasn't Carlos, just a man who had stolen his identity. Meanwhile, Callie deals with tax problems.
| 6 | 6 | "Doppelganger" | Guy Ferland | Story by : Matt Witten; Teleplay by : David J. Burke | August 15, 2010 | BDF105 | 2.80 |
A man suffering from head trauma claims to have witnessed a murder before being attacked and believes the murderer looks exactly like him.
| 7 | 7 | "Cassadaga" | Bill Eagles | Alfonso H. Moreno | August 22, 2010 | BDF106 | 3.32 |
Longworth and Carlos investigate the murder of a psychic adviser in the town of Cassadaga, where a former psychic predicts that a close friend of Longworth's will die.
| 8 | 8 | "Marriage Is Murder" | Jonathan Frakes | Tom Garrigus | August 29, 2010 | BDF107 | 3.08 |
A ruthless divorce attorney is murdered. Meanwhile Callie's son, Jeff claims to have seen a man standing at his window, but Callie believes he's imagining it. Believing Jeff is telling the truth, Jim has the boy look at mugshots on the computer, through which Jeff finds out the truth about his father's criminal past and confronts his mom.
| 9 | 9 | "Honey" | Colin Bucksey | Elle Johnson | September 5, 2010 | BDF108 | 3.21 |
Jim Longworth's latest case sends him to the famed Native American-owned Blues Rock Casino, a high-end gambling establishment filled with millions of dollars of rock 'n' roll memorabilia. When the head of the casino, a tribal elder, crashes through a skylight and lands on a roulette table, Longworth must figure out who is behind her mysterious death. Was it suicide or foul play? Jim's first hurdle is getting the smart and sexy Josie Tigertail, a tribal police officer, to allow the Florida Department of Law Enforcement to run point on the investigation. Meanwhile, Callie convinces herself she just wants to be friends with Longworth, but then is surprised when feelings of jealousy overtake her upon seeing Longworth interact with Josie.
| 10 | 10 | "Second Chance" | Tricia Brock | Tom Garrigus | September 12, 2010 | BDF109 | 3.08 |
A dead man in a swimming pool leads Longworth and Carlos to a Pompano Beach mansion, and then into the world of high-end horse breeding. Callie, who was once an aspiring jockey, becomes Longworth's secret weapon in the case as she shows him the ins and outs of this competitive and cut-throat world. Callie shows Jim a side of her he's never seen and the two grow closer than ever before.
| 11 | 11 | "Booty" | Elodie Keene | Lee Goldberg & William Rabkin | September 19, 2010 | BDF110 | 2.93 |
A famed treasure-hunter is murdered, and the attention is immediately turned to the victim's famous uncle Big Jack Hasker, a legendary treasure hunter and adventurer. Longworth dives into this world of treasure hunting and discovers the victim was hot on the trail to uncovering the mythic Spanish ship, the Magdalena, which is believed to contain billions of dollars of booty. If Longworth can figure out whether or not the victim was actually close to uncovering the prize, maybe he will be able to find the real killer. While working the case, Longworth discovers Callie's passion for treasure hunting lore and guided by her passion and expertise, the two embark on an adventure that could change their lives forever.
| 12 | 12 | "Exposed" | Gary A. Randall | Alfonso H. Moreno | September 26, 2010 | BDF111 | 2.73 |
The death of a young woman puts Jim at odds with a powerful political family when it appears she was having an affair with a Florida State Senator. Complicating matters is the senator's wife, who will do whatever it takes to protect her husband's political career and her family's name.
| 13 | 13 | "Breaking 80" | Dennie Gordon | Matt Witten & Alfonso H. Moreno | October 3, 2010 | BDF112 | 2.69 |
A man who was recently released from prison is found dead along the fairway. The man was the caddy and life-long friend of professional golfer Scott Winters. Longworth discovers the victim may have served time for a crime he didn't commit.

=== Season 2 (2011) ===
| No. overall | No. in season | Title | Directed by | Written by | Original release date | Prod. code | US viewers (millions) |
|---|---|---|---|---|---|---|---|
| 14 | 1 | "Family Matters" | Gary A. Randall | Tom Garrigus | June 5, 2011 | BDF201 | 3.01 |
The daughter of a Cuban mobster is murdered, and Jim must solve the case while preventing a war between rival mob families. Callie prepares for Ray's release from jail, and tells Jim she wants to be with him, yet promises Ray to hold off on a divorce for three months. Manus warns Jim a complaint has been filed regarding his relationship with Callie, and advises Jim to allow the family to solve their problems.
| 15 | 2 | "Old Ghosts" | Lee Rose | Clifton Campbell & Alfonso H. Moreno | June 12, 2011 | BDF202 | 2.61 |
Jim hunts a serial killer from Chicago with the help of detective Samantha Harper, who Callie learns is his former lover. Manus offers Callie a job with the FDLE as a forensic nurse.
| 16 | 3 | "Lost and Found" | Kelly Makin | Clifton Campbell & Kim Newton | June 19, 2011 | BDF204 | 2.39 |
An incident at a slumber party and a missing baby are the concerns of the day---the baby is the son of the Navy recruiter found dead by the slumber party girls. Callie joins the FDLE as a forensic nurse. Jim, Callie, and Samantha navigate among the recruiter's troubled former wife, the father of a Navy recruit who blames the recruiter for his son's death in Afghanistan, and the ex-wife's young boyfriend to reach the truth.
| 17 | 4 | "Moonlighting" | Jonathan Frakes | Elle Johnson | June 26, 2011 | BDF203 | 2.53 |
The body of a mechanic leads to an investigation involving NASCAR; when Ray is attacked in front of Jeff, Callie considers witness protection.
| 18 | 5 | "Dirty Little Secrets" | Timothy Busfield | Story by : John Mankiewicz; Teleplay by : Clifton Campbell & Elle Johnson & John Mankiewicz | July 10, 2011 | BDF205 | 2.80 |
A dead man in a bathroom stall leads to a posh rehab facility. Carlos balances work, play and family. Callie and Jeff carry on with Ray gone.
| 19 | 6 | "Gibtown" | Jeff Bleckner | Alfonso H. Moreno | July 17, 2011 | BDF206 | 2.57 |
A town of circus sideshow performers becomes a town of suspects in a murder. Callie and Jim come to terms on what their relationship means. Sam considers taking a job with the FDLE.
| 20 | 7 | "Addicted To Love" | Jeremiah Chechik | Tom Garrigus & Clifton Campbell | July 24, 2011 | BDF207 | 2.40 |
A dead Haitian doctor leads to black market prescription meds.
| 21 | 8 | "Second Skin" | Tricia Brock | Lois Johnson | July 31, 2011 | BDF208 | 2.59 |
A man is found poisoned by snakes in a church.
| 22 | 9 | "Iron Pipeline" | Eric Laneuville | Alfonso H. Moreno & Clifton Campbell | August 7, 2011 | BDF209 | 2.26 |
Jeff's mentor, the high school soccer coach, is found shot dead on campus.
| 23 | 10 | "Swamp Thing" | Timothy Busfield | Tom Garrigus | August 14, 2011 | BDF210 | 2.89 |
Clues to a murder are found because of a poached animal. Jim and Callie restart their relationship.
| 24 | 11 | "Beached" | Artie Mandelberg | Karen Hall | August 21, 2011 | BDF211 | 2.64 |
A love triangle leads to murder. Callie has some big news for Jim.
| 25 | 12 | "Shine" | Jon Terlesky | Story by : Shaz Bennett; Teleplay by : Elle Johnson | August 28, 2011 | BDF212 | 2.71 |
Bootleggers may have murdered a man on a themed booze cruise. Someone from Callie's past comes back with big news and it could threaten her relationship with Jim, the hospital, and the FDLE.
| 26 | 13 | "Breakout" | Kelly Makin | Elle Johnson & Tom Garrigus & Alfonso H. Moreno | September 5, 2011 | BDF213 | 2.38 |
Two brothers, former inmates, take Callie's hospital hostage.

=== Season 3 (2012) ===
| No. overall | No. in season | Title | Directed by | Written by | Original release date | Prod. code | US viewers (millions) |
|---|---|---|---|---|---|---|---|
| 27 | 1 | "Close Encounters" | Jeff Bleckner | Tom Garrigus | June 3, 2012 | BDF301 | 3.11 |
A young couple discover an older man's dead body, after they see what they perceive to be a UFO. The victim turns out a multi-millionaire devoted to the cause of UFOs and extraterrestrial phenomena who left his entire fortune to UFO group Jim and Daniel discover may be fraudulent---and whose widow may be hiding more than she lets on.
| 28 | 2 | "Poseidon Adventure" | Lee Rose | Elle Johnson | June 10, 2012 | BDF302 | 2.90 |
A lifeguard clears the beach when he thinks he has seen a shark fin in the water, until after closer inspection it is revealed the fin actually belongs to a dead woman in a mermaid costume whose sister---also a member of their mermaid-show troupe---becomes a prime suspect. Jim encourages Callie to take a head nurse job in Atlanta. Even though they will be apart, he assures her things will work out.
| 29 | 3 | "Longworth's Anatomy" | Randy Zisk | Wendy Battles | June 17, 2012 | BDF303 | 2.53 |
Carlos performs an autopsy for Daniel's classmates, then dismisses them when he discovers that the victim did not die as reported. Jim helps Callie set up her residence in Atlanta where she reveals how much she misses him. She later falls asleep with his shirt under her head.
| 30 | 4 | "The Naked Truth" | Eric Laneuville | Lisa Henthorn | June 24, 2012 | BDF304 | 3.11 |
A nude woman's body is found under an overturned boat on a riverbank, leading the team to the nearby Swan Lake nudist colony. Jennifer flirts with Jim, telling him that she has to keep her eyes on him.
| 31 | 5 | "Food Fight" | Ron Underwood | Dailyn Rodriguez | July 1, 2012 | BDF305 | 2.50 |
Carlos, Jennifer, and Jim go to lunch and find the owner of a food truck dead. Jim visits Callie to boost her mood. She then pours her heart out to him.
| 32 | 6 | "Old Times" | Kelly Makin | Lee Goldberg & William Rabkin | July 8, 2012 | BDF306 | 3.19 |
Joggers find a woman's dead body. She had been stabbed eight times and her body moved to the site. The victim had worked with the Innocence Project to exonerate a death row inmate who may have been innocent thanks in large part to sloppy work by Jim's imprisoned former partner, who ends up assigned to the new case on a special release. Although the episode begins with Jim and Callie in bed together, it ends with him having dinner with Jennifer.
| 33 | 7 | "Public Enemy" | Lee Rose | Elle Johnson | July 15, 2012 | BDF307 | 3.37 |
Three boys playing football decide to check out a neighborhood house they have been curious about. They find the owner dead on the porch. Jim, Jennifer, Carlos, and Danny are led from there into the shadowy world of an anti-government group against whom the victim, a county recorder's office worker, was working. Jim promises to help Callie in her tax case, and finding her old cell phone produces a recording that may exonerate her and incriminate the tax auditor who tried to get sex from her in return for a favourable result.
| 34 | 8 | "Fountain of Youth" | Gary A. Randall | Tom Garrigus | July 22, 2012 | BDF308 | 3.18 |
A retired supermodel's dead body is found in a pool at a spa she co-founded. Jim and Callie profess their love for each other.
| 35 | 9 | "Islandia" | Emile Levisetti | Dailyn Rodriguez | August 5, 2012 | BDF309 | 3.09 |
A $130 million lottery winner is found murdered. Autopsy shows trauma to the head and a poison in his system. The victim's ne'er-do-well brother and an attractive realtor who remade herself into a stand-in for the victim's lost love fall under suspicion. Jim and Callie's communication suffers as she must study for her exam.
| 36 | 10 | "Endless Summer" | Jeff Bleckner | Story by : Shaz Bennett; Teleplay by : Wendy Battles | August 12, 2012 | BDF310 | 3.10 |
The founder of a new surf clothing line is discovered murdered just as she was to offer an endorsement to a young, local surfing champion. Jim proposes to Callie, even though she has passed her board exam and may move to Atlanta.

=== Season 4 (2013) ===
| No. overall | No. in season | Title | Directed by | Written by | Original release date | Prod. code | US viewers (millions) |
|---|---|---|---|---|---|---|---|
| 37 | 1 | "Yankee Dan" | Emile Levisetti | Dailyn Rodriguez | May 27, 2013 | BDF401 | 3.26 |
Jim and Carlos investigate the murder of a woman at an old plantation reputed to be haunted by the ghost of its owner's widow, an owner once believed to have been murdered by a slave in the Civil War era. Callie gives Jim an answer to his proposal.
| 38 | 2 | "Shot Girls" | Jonathan Frakes | John J. Sakmar & Kerry Lenhart | June 3, 2013 | BDF402 | 2.74 |
The body of a spokesmodel washes up on the beach and Jim investigates the prominent rum brand that employed her. Callie and Jeff pack for her move back to Florida.
| 39 | 3 | "Killer Barbecue" | Paul Edwards | Tom Garrigus | June 10, 2013 | BDF403 | 2.31 |
An owner of a large BBQ business is found dead at a BBQ cook-off. Daniel teams up with his brother Drew to win the same BBQ cook-off.
| 40 | 4 | "Magic Longworth" | Donna Deitch | Matthew J. Lieberman | June 17, 2013 | BDF404 | 2.31 |
Jim and Carlos look into the death of a male entertainer.
| 41 | 5 | "Apocalypse Now" | Marc Roskin | Elle Johnson | June 24, 2013 | BDF405 | 2.56 |
Jim and the FDLE search for the body of a disappearing 10K Zombie run coordinator.
| 42 | 6 | "Glade-iators!" | Martha Coolidge | John J. Sakmar & Kerry Lenhart | July 1, 2013 | BDF406 | 2.55 |
The body of a prestigious bank VP mysteriously appears in the bank's vault. Jim discovers that the victim was not such a delicate dame after all.
| 43 | 7 | "Gypsies, Tramps and Thieves" | Ron Underwood | Tom Garrigus | July 8, 2013 | BDF407 | 2.51 |
A ritualistically decorated crime scene sends Jim and Carlos in search of Floridian gypsies. Jeff leaves Florida to see his dad while Michael Longworth, Jim's dad, drops by for a visit.
| 44 | 8 | "Three's Company" | Eric Laneuville | Matthew J. Liberman | July 15, 2013 | BDF408 | 2.40 |
Mitch Buckner, a financial planner, is found dead in a house that he was looking to buy. Michael informs Jim that he and his mother are divorcing.
| 45 | 9 | "Fast Ball" | Ron Underwood | Elle Johnson | July 29, 2013 | BDF409 | 2.38 |
A towel boy finds professional jai alai player Lori Aest's body in a laundry bin at an arena.
| 46 | 10 | "Gallerinas" | Eric Laneuville | Dailyn Rodriguez | August 5, 2013 | BDF410 | 2.32 |
Texas oil billionaire and art collector Richard Harris Crawford's body falls out of a crate.
| 47 | 11 | "Civil War" | Kelly Makin | John J. Sakmar & Kerry Lenhart | August 12, 2013 | BDF411 | 2.31 |
Assistant state's attorney Ethan Russell is found dead near a Civil War re-enactment.
| 48 | 12 | "Happy Trails" | Gary A. Randall | Shaz Bennett | August 19, 2013 | BDF412 | 2.69 |
A dead cowboy is found with a shotgun wound in his chest and a circle with a "G" in the middle branded into his chaps. Meanwhile, Jim and a federal marshal continue tracking Ray's movements in the western U.S. after Ray walks out of his witness protection home, and Callie's former Atlanta supervisor Miranda arrives for the wedding.
| 49 | 13 | "Tin Cup" | Randy Zisk | Tom Garrigus | August 26, 2013 | BDF413 | 3.41 |
A man's body, dressed for play on a golf course, is found on a mini-golf course. Since Jim's wedding day is two days away, Manus wants to give the case to someone else. He insists on taking it. Callie's son Jeff surprises her by showing up for the wedding. Jim and the team learn the victim was a golf hustler who also works for a wealthy course designer aiming to take Palm Glades's public golf course over. Callie and other wedding guests start to get worried about Jim not showing up. Jim is then seen being shot twice in the chest in their new home.

== Ratings ==
The Glades : U.S. viewers per episode (millions)

| Season | Episode number | | | | | | | | | | | | |
| Season | 1 | 2 | 3 | 4 | 5 | 6 | 7 | 8 | 9 | 10 | 11 | 12 | 13 |
|---|---|---|---|---|---|---|---|---|---|---|---|---|---|
| 1 | 3.55 | 3.35 | 2.92 | 3.29 | 3.10 | 2.80 | 3.32 | 3.08 | 3.21 | 3.08 | 2.93 | 2.73 | 2.69 |
| 2 | 3.01 | 2.61 | 2.39 | 2.53 | 2.80 | 2.57 | 2.40 | 2.59 | 2.26 | 2.89 | 2.64 | 2.71 | 2.38 |
| 3 | 3.11 | 2.90 | 2.53 | 3.11 | 2.50 | 3.19 | 3.37 | 3.18 | 3.09 | 3.10 | – | | |
| 4 | 3.26 | 2.74 | 2.31 | 2.31 | 2.56 | 2.55 | 2.51 | 2.40 | 2.38 | 2.32 | 2.31 | 2.69 | 3.41 |

Audience measurement performed by Nielsen Media Research
