= Falling Skies season 5 =

Falling Skies
- Season 5
- Promotional poster
- Starring: Noah Wyle; Moon Bloodgood; Drew Roy; Connor Jessup; Maxim Knight; Mpho Koaho; Sarah Carter; Colin Cunningham; Doug Jones; Will Patton
- No. of episodes: 10

Release
- Original network: TNT
- Original release: June 28 – August 30, 2015

Season chronology
- ← Previous; Season 4

Falling Skies was renewed for a fifth and final season, which began airing June 28, 2015, and concluded August 30, 2015.

== Plot ==
In the aftermath of the destruction of the Espheni power core, the Espheni occupation of Earth is faltering. All forms of mechanized technology the Espheni have deployed including airships, mech robots, and harnesses have gone offline, and the remaining Espheni forces have begun retreating from the 2nd Mass and resistance groups around the world. In the midst of space, Tom finds himself rescued by a mysterious alien race named the Dornia, or the "Great Enemy", who are the Espheni's greatest enemy and the reason for their intergalactic expansion. They communicate with Tom using a memory of his wife Rebecca and later directly while still using the image of Rebecca, influencing him to show no mercy against the Espheni. They return him to Earth, where Tom leads the 2nd Mass on a series of raids against key Espheni locations in an effort to dismantle their war machine before they can restore power to their mechs and ships on the Earth. But along the way, the 2nd Mass face discontent from within and lose important members of the team.

The 2nd Mass learn of militias fighting against the Espheni worldwide with the help of the Volm, who also inform them that the Espheni are active in several capital cities around the world, and have placed jamming signals to prevent them from learning exactly what they're doing. They come to learn that the final battle against the Espheni could be in Washington, D.C., and they begin a slow march towards the city. Along the way Tom learns that the Dornians were the first race the Espheni destroyed, and the skitters that they've been fighting were once Dornians until the Espheni transformed them into their servants. Pope and Sara begin a romance that is short-lived when she is stuck and killed in an Espheni trap; Pope blames Tom for her death when he chose to destroy a facility that was mass-producing skitters instead of saving her. Tom, sick of Pope's constant complaining and vitriol, kicks him out of the 2nd Mass; several others including Anthony go with him. The 2nd Mass come across a naval station currently occupied by a group of soldiers under the command of female captain named Katie Marshall with whom Weaver once had a relationship. Tom and his sons are imprisoned for conspiring with the Espheni; Anne is eventually arrested as well once the soldiers learn that her daughter was half-Espheni. Weaver becomes suspicious of Katie's behavior, noting that she's not acting like her normal self (to which other soldiers agree); he follows her off-base one night and finds her talking to an overlord which he then kills after she leaves. Katie, under the orders of the overlord, tries and convicts Tom and his family of aiding the enemy and orders their execution. Weaver, along with other soldiers convinced that Captain Marshall isn't herself, refuse to carry out the execution. When Katie tries to shoot them herself, Weaver fatally stabs her. Katie dies shortly afterward, confessing that she wasn't the real Katie but an Espheni doppelganger sent to infiltrate human resistance groups.

Tom is again contacted by the Dornia, who provide him with a powerful bio-weapon to use against the Espheni. Ben, who has been listening to overlord communications through a recovered Espheni communication device, learns that the Espheni are ruled by a queen who has come to Earth to oversee the occupation and has made the Lincoln Memorial her base. Tom tells Anne and the others about the Dornian weapon, and they are unsure if they should use it not knowing how it might affect humans. Anne and other scientists manage to alter the weapon so it only targets Espheni, leaving humans unharmed. Its effectiveness is proven on an Espheni clone of Alexis Glass-Mason who is sent to assassinate Tom.

After learning that Washington, D.C., is too well defended for a direct attack on the queen, Tom instead leads a strike team in through service tunnels while the rest of the militias attack a defensive wall built to keep them out as a distraction. After an explosion separates them, Tom continues on alone and finally comes face to face with the Espheni queen in the ruins of the Lincoln Memorial. There, the queen explains that the attack on Earth is in revenge for a failed attempt 1,500 years before that led to the death of her daughter. Tom infects himself with the Dornia bioweapon as the queen drains his blood, infecting and killing her. The bioweapon spreads through the Espheni and their various slave races and wipes them out, freeing the Earth. Anne dies of injuries sustained in the assault, but the Dornia resurrect her as thanks. Months later, humanity gathers at the Lincoln Memorial to select a new leader for the now-united race.

== Cast and characters ==
=== Main cast ===
- Noah Wyle as Tom Mason (10 episodes)
- Moon Bloodgood as Anne Glass-Mason (10 episodes)
- Drew Roy as Hal Mason (10 episodes)
- Connor Jessup as Ben Mason (10 episodes)
- Maxim Knight as Matt Mason (10 episodes)
- Colin Cunningham as John Pope (8 episodes)
- Sarah Sanguin Carter as Maggie (10 episodes)
- Mpho Koaho as Anthony (8 episodes)
- Doug Jones as Cochise (10 episodes)
- Will Patton as Colonel Dan Weaver (10 episodes)

=== Recurring cast ===
- Mira Sorvino as Sara (3 episodes)
- Jennifer Ferrin as Dornia/Rebecca Mason (5 episodes)
- Catalina Sandino Moreno as Isabella (6 episodes)
- Treva Etienne as Dingaan Botha (10 episodes)
- Taylor Russell as Evelyn (5 episodes)
- John DeSantis as Shaq (3 episodes)
- Todd Weeks as Marty (4 episodes)

=== Guest cast ===
- Megan Danso as Deni (1 episode)
- Scarlett Byrne as Alexis "Lexi" Glass-Mason (2 episode)
- Julia Sarah Stone as Caitlin (2 episodes)
- Melora Hardin as Captain Katie Marshall (2 episodes)

== Episodes ==
No. overall	No. in season	Title	Directed by	Written by	Original release date	US viewers (millions)
43	1	"Find Your Warrior"	Olatunde Osunsanmi	David Eick	June 28, 2015	2.04
Tom relives an old memory of when his wife told him about her breast cancer, but she tells him the importance of wiping out every cell and tells him to find his warrior, to give into rage to win the battle against it. He then finds himself in the ocean and returns to the 2nd Mass and gives a speech telling them to give into their rage and find their warrior, and to take the battle to the Espheni. They learn from Cochise about militias all around the world. The 2nd Mass split into three teams and target three Espheni locations; Tom's team is ambushed by Skitters when they target an Overlord's escape pod and are rescued by Weaver's team, and Sara helps destroy the pod. Believing that the Skitters were controlled by an Overlord, they learn that it is hiding in Woodrow Wilson High School. Tom finds the Overlord, who is controlling Ben, and is told that he has turned into a savage and that he is not afraid of him. Tom tells the Overlord that he is not afraid of him either and shoots him dead. After the battle, the 2nd Mass gather around the fire where Deni's body is being burned.
44	2	"Hunger Pains"	Olatunde Osunsanmi	Marc Dube	July 5, 2015	1.82
Under massive and sustained attack by swarms of hungry skitters, the 2nd Mass accidentally lose their food store in the battle. When Ben discovers a small store of food in the rubble, they decide to send a team consisting of Pope, Sara, Maggie and Ben to the food manufacturers warehouse. While there they discover enough food to solve their food crisis, and a girl called Caitlin who lives in the warehouse with her skitterized brother Brian. Maggie promises to help Brian and offers them a chance to leave with them in exchange for Caitlin allowing them to leave with the food, to which she agrees. They load up a truck with food and leave for Chinatown, and are then saved by Dingaan's drone when skitters swarm the truck. Anne decides to examine the bug that bit Tom and learns that it is part Skitter, part Espheni, and has Human eyes. When it escapes, she and Tom follow it and discover a huge swarm of Skitters and Hornets.
45	3	"Hatchlings"	Rob Lieberman	Jonathan Glassner	July 12, 2015	1.88
The 2nd Mass believe the Espheni are manufacturing Skitters and send a team consisting of Pope and Sara out to investigate. Meanwhile, Tom has Ben draw a picture of an alien seen in his visions and learns from Cochise that they are called the Dornia, a species he believes to be extinct that were enslaved by the Espheni and turned into Skitters. Maggie and Hal track Caitlin and her brother Brian to a forest after they escape, and find them with an Overlord, but they are powerless to stop Brian shooting Caitlin and then himself. After earlier injuring the Overlord and taking it captive, they return to Chinatown. Believing it to be their only option, Ben comes up with a plan with Maggie to peer into the Overlord's mind to locate the Hatchery. As the 2nd Mass is about to leave on the mission, Pope pleads with them to help Sara who is stuck in a quicksand-like bog nearby, but Tom tells him the mission is too important and that they will come back for her afterwards. That night, with the hatchery destroyed, they return and find Pope who despairs at Sara's death, and Pope tells Tom that he was too late.
46	4	"Pope Breaks Bad"	Peter Leto	Jack Kenny	July 19, 2015	1.96
The Mason family and Weaver deal with the news that Cochise's life is coming to an end when he summons his father's ship. Before he leaves, Cochise gives Tom a device that shows the Espheni jamming signals in capital cities across the world, including Washington D.C. and Moscow. Tom then leads a team to a police station for supplies and Dingaan uses a radio to make contact with a resistance group in Peru. When Tom returns, Pope notices that Ryan is not with them and angrily confronts him about his leadership and questions why people except those important to him are dying. Tom attempts to justify his actions to date and tells him that he lost his daughter in the war, and that they're done and that he should leave Chinatown. Meanwhile, Anne performs an operation on Cochise when his father agrees to the transplant and saves his life, but his father dies soon after. Anne helps him come to terms with his grief and together they perform a ritual where she sees Lexi. Tom is then contacted by the Dornia who use a memory of Rebecca to speak with him, and he learns that Pope had abducted Hal and leaves to save him.
47	5	"Non-Essential Personnel"	Olatunde Osunsanmi	Jim Barnes	July 26, 2015	2.03
Pope and his group rescue a group of survivors fleeing a skitter attack. The group however are unaware that Pope plans to recruit those of use to him into his group and eject those he deems to be "non-essential personnel". Isabella convinces Pope to allow her to join his group by posing as a nurse when she's chosen as non-essential. Meanwhile, Pope leads Tom over the radio to random locations with the promise that Hal will be there, and then attacks Hal with a knife when he becomes angered by Tom's remarks. The 2nd Mass set out from Chinatown, but are attacked by a man named Marty who demands their ammo and a truck. Weaver talks the man down and then offers him a place among the 2nd Mass when he learns that Marty's family are dead. Tom discovers three survivors ejected from Pope's group and learns where Hal is being held. The Dornia warn him against saving Hal, and tell him that if he dies the war will be lost. Isabella and Hal make their way to a truck, and Hal watches as Tom shoots Pope, and is shot by Pope in the leg. Tom tells them to leave before a Hornet carries him away. Bloodied, Pope demands to know where Tom is.
48	6	"Respite"	Jonathan Frakes	Ayanna A. Floyd	August 2, 2015	1.93
Tom awakens disoriented in a house and has his wounds tended to by a woman he initially believes to be Rebecca. He learns that the family have lived in the property the entire time and have avoided the effects of the Espheni war. He then cleans himself up and joins the family for dinner and becomes emotional at the normality of their life. The 2nd Mass arrive at a whiskey distillery and search for what they believe to be a communications device that can help them win the war. Meanwhile, Isabella and Hal have to abandon their truck during their search for Tom. They discover the wounded Hornet that had taken Tom and find him at the house. Before they leave, Tom persuades the boy who wanted to join the war effort to remain with his family and protect them. When Marty discovers the Espheni communications device, Weaver uses it and sees a group of Overlords gathered before collapsing from the strain. When Tom, Hal and Isabella arrive at the distillery, the reunion is cut short when Weaver breaks the news to Tom about their discovery.
49	7	"Everybody Has Their Reasons"	Matt Earl Beesley	Ryan Mottesheard	August 9, 2015	1.98
The 2nd Mass find Naval Station Norfolk staffed with soldiers from the 14th Virginia division. The CO is one of Weaver's old friends from a previous war. After an initial warm welcome, Tom becomes suspicious when he notices that the soldiers are focused on targeting people whom they believe to be Espheni collaborators, instead of taking the fight to the Espheni. Ben is targeted and has one of his spikes forcefully removed after being attacked by a group of soldiers. The CO orders that Tom, Hal, and Ben be arrested and accuses them of being Espheni collaborators when she learns and compiles a dossier of the experiences the 2nd Mass has been through. Weaver unsuccessfully reasons with her and sends Matt to the distillery to get reinforcements. Tom is aggressive and belligerent at his court martial, and his righteous indignation only succeeds in him and his "co-conspirators" being given the death penalty. Meanwhile, an Overlord watches the events going on in the base.
50	8	"Stalag 14th Virginia"	Noah Wyle	Jack Kenny	August 16, 2015	1.94
Marshall prepares to execute Tom and his family, causing them to attempt to flee. Tom escapes, but everyone else is recaptured. Lieutenant Shelton, realizing that Marshall has gone too far and is running a witch hunt, tries to relieve her of command but is killed. Marshall later meets with the Overlord who is then killed by Weaver. At the execution, Marshall's firing squad hesitates, giving Tom time to return with Cochise and reinforcements from the 2nd Mass. The 14th Virginia surrenders and Weaver kills Marshall to save Tom's life. It is revealed that the real Katie Marshall died weeks before and the one they encountered was an Espheni clone being used to weed out their human enemies in the guise of hunting for collaborators. Using Cochise as an example, Tom is able to convince the 14th Virginia that they don't have to be afraid of the Volm and need to work together, and the 14th Virginia joins with the 2nd Mass. Using his spikes, Ben is able to connect to the Espheni communications device discovered earlier and finds that the Overlords serve some kind of higher being, surprising all but Cochise as it had been believed that the Overlords were the leaders. Cochise shows knowledge of this being, but expresses surprise at its existence being real.
51	9	"Reunion"	Brad Turner	Marc Dube	August 23, 2015	1.76
Matt finds Lexi alive in the woods and brings her back to the base despite suspicion that she is just another Espheni clone. Tom questions Lexi for information and she claims to have been saved by the Dornia like he was and explains that the being that the Espheni worship is their queen and that if she is there, then it means that the Espheni are moving on from invasion to occupation. Tom connects a radio network and is informed that the Mason Militias all over the US are speeding towards Washington D.C., and with this knowledge, Tom gives a motivating speech to them via radio. Several people then show up at the base covered in bandages, supposedly members of a militia which has taken heavy losses. Shortly after they are all in the base, one takes off the bandages, revealing himself to be John Pope while the other follows. Pope leads an attack on the base, killing multiple members of the 14th Virginia. As shooting rages across the base, the tide turns against Pope as his crew is driven into a corner with explosive barrels. After a brief argument between Tom and Pope, Tom and Weaver shoot the explosive barrels, seemingly killing Pope and repelling the assault. Afterwards, Tom is approached by the Dornia again who explains that it is the last of its species and is hoping that he can help it stop the Espheni forever by delivering its weapon to the queen which will wipe out all the Espheni. Tom takes the weapon to Anne and Marty who discover that it is deadly to both humans and Espheni, but are able to modify it so that it has no effect on humans. Ben continues to connect to the Espheni Shadow Plane in hopes of learning the location of the queen. He finds a clue, "at the foot of the giant" and that Lexi is actually an Espheni clone sent to assassinate Tom. Ben raises the alarm in time to save Tom and the clone is killed with the Dornia weapon, proving its effectiveness. Before dying, the clone warns Tom that the Espheni are onto him. Using Ben's clue, Tom realizes that the Espheni queen is at the Lincoln Memorial, giving the resistance a target for their attack on Washington, DC. As the 2nd Mass prepares to roll out the next morning, they see a massive swarm of Black Hornets heading straight for the base.
52	10	"Reborn"	Olatunde Osunsanmi	David Eick	August 30, 2015	2.39
The Black Hornet attack is repelled, but Marty is killed. As a result of the attack, the 2nd Mass and 14th Virginia are forced to stay at their base another night. The next morning, shortly after the arrival of another militia, they receive word that Washington, D.C. is surrounded by an impenetrable defensive wall. As a result, the plan is changed so that the other militias attack the wall as a distraction while Tom and Weaver lead a strike team through the city's service tunnels to assassinate the Espheni queen. In the tunnels, an Espheni hatchling attack separates the rest of the team from Tom and mortally wounds a pregnant Anne. During the attack, Hal takes Maggie to propose to her as they take cover and she accepts. Tom continues on alone and finally comes face to face with the Espheni queen in the ruins of the Lincoln Memorial. The queen explains that the attack on Earth was revenge for a previous attempt 1,500 years ago that failed and led to her daughter's death. The queen starts to drain Tom's blood, but he takes advantage of this fact and infects himself with the Dornia bioweapon. The queen absorbs the bioweapon through Tom's blood and dies. As expected, the bioweapon passes through the queen's connection to her race and the Espheni die out all over the world, finally freeing Earth. However, Anne dies of her wounds despite Weaver's best attempts to save her. Desperate, Tom takes her where he last saw the Dornia and pleads with them to save her in repayment for his actions. The Dornia take Anne as Tom is confronted by a mortally injured Pope who survived his attack on Tom's base. Pope realizes he takes no pleasure in Tom's misery and lays down his weapon before dying of his injuries. Months later, thousands of people gather at the rebuilt Lincoln Memorial to elect a new leader for a united humanity. Matt ends up writing a book about the invasion, Hal and Maggie are an engaged couple, and Ben speaks among the Volm delegation. Tom, who rejects offers to become that new leader, gives a speech to the masses, including his children, Maggie, Anne, Weaver and Cochise about how the Espheni invasion has given humanity a second chance as a united species.

== Production ==
=== Development ===
Falling Skies was renewed for a fifth and final 10 episode season which premiered on June 28, 2015.

=== Casting ===
On October 17, 2014, it was announced that Catalina Sandino Moreno had joined the cast in a major recurring role as a character called Isabella. Her character has been described as an academic prior to the invasion, who joins the group after posing as a nurse.

=== Filming ===
Principal photography began on September 15, 2014, and concluded on January 27, 2015.

== Ratings ==
No.	Title	Air date	Rating (18–49)	Viewers (millions)	DVR (18–49)	DVR viewers (millions)	Total (18–49)	Total viewers (millions)
1	"Find Your Warrior"	June 28, 2015	0.5	2.04	0.5	1.41	1.0	3.45
2	"Hunger Pains"	July 5, 2015	0.4	1.82	0.4	1.39	0.8	3.21
3	"Hatchlings"	July 12, 2015	0.4	1.88	0.4	1.28	0.8	3.16
4	"Pope Breaks Bad"	July 19, 2015	0.5	1.96	0.4	1.27	0.9	3.23
5	"Non-Essential Personnel"	July 26, 2015	0.5	2.03	0.4	1.24	0.9	3.28
6	"Respite"	August 2, 2015	0.5	1.93	0.4	1.39	0.9	3.32
7	"Everybody Has Their Reasons"	August 9, 2015	0.5	1.98	0.4	1.39	0.9	3.37
8	"Stalag 14th Virginia"	August 16, 2015	0.4	1.94	0.4	1.51	0.8	3.45
9	"Reunion"	August 23, 2015	0.5	1.76	0.4	1.54	0.9	3.30
10	"Reborn"	August 30, 2015	0.6	2.39	0.4	1.46	1.1	3.86
