= Falling Skies season 4 =

Falling Skies
- Season 4
- Promotional poster
- Starring: Noah Wyle; Moon Bloodgood; Drew Roy; Connor Jessup; Maxim Knight; Seychelle Gabriel; Mpho Koaho; Sarah Carter; Colin Cunningham; Doug Jones; Scarlett Byrne; Will Patton
- No. of episodes: 12

Release
- Original network: TNT
- Original release: June 22 – August 31, 2014

Season chronology
- ← Previous; Season 3 Next → Season 5

Falling Skies was renewed for a fourth season, which aired from June 22 to August 31, 2014. The season consists of twelve episodes instead of the usual ten. On July 18, 2014, TNT renewed the show for a fifth and final season.

== Cast and characters ==
=== Main ===
- Noah Wyle as Tom Mason
- Moon Bloodgood as Anne Glass
- Drew Roy as Hal Mason
- Connor Jessup as Ben Mason
- Maxim Knight as Matt Mason
- Colin Cunningham as John Pope
- Sarah Sanguin Carter as Maggie
- Mpho Koaho as Anthony
- Doug Jones as Cochise
- Seychelle Gabriel as Lourdes
- Scarlett Byrne as Alexis "Lexi" Glass-Mason
- Will Patton as Dan Weaver

=== Recurring ===
- Jessy Schram as Karen Nadler
- Christie Burke as Elise
- Megan Danso as Deni
- Dakota Daulby as Kent Matthews
- John DeSantis as Shaq
- Treva Etienne as Dingaan Botha
- Robert Sean Leonard as Roger Kadar
- Laci J. Mailey as Jeanne Weaver
- Ryan Robbins as Tector Murphy
- Desiree Ross as Mira, Matt's friend at the re-education camp
- Mira Sorvino as Sara
- Mark Gibbon as Scorch
- Robert Clotworthy as the Monk

== Episodes ==
No. overall	No. in season	Title	Directed by	Written by	Original release date	US viewers (millions)
31	1	"Ghost in the Machine"	Greg Beeman	David Eick	June 22, 2014	3.67
The 2nd Mass arrive back in Charleston after twenty-three days of travel, but their celebrations are cut short when the Espheni attack. When the Espheni deploy mechs and a new weapon that creates impenetrable fences of energy between metal obelisks against the group, the 2nd Mass is split apart. Four months later, and now in solitary confinement at an Espheni ghetto, Tom escapes confinement whenever possible in order to gather intelligence on the camp and the skitter locations. At an Espheni re-education camp, Matt is tasked with ensuring that the other children in his group comply with the rules. Meanwhile, Ben awakens in Chinatown and is immediately suspicious of his surroundings; although Maggie assures him that the place is safe and untouched by the Espheni, he later meets a now grown-up Lexi. Elsewhere, Anne leads the 2nd Mass survivors on an attack against an Espheni weapons shipment, but is surprised to find children inside the truck. When she learns that the children know nothing of Lexi, she decides to travel in the assumed direction of the truck. Back at the ghetto, Hal clashes with Pope over a generator required in his escape plan. Tom meets Cochise and learns that the Volm have left the Earth, leaving behind small recon teams, and that the Espheni have similar ghettos across the planet. Believing humanity to be facing extinction, Cochise offers Tom words of support, and Tom requests that he try to find Anne, Ben, Matt, and Lexi, to which he agrees. Meanwhile aboard an Espheni ship over the ghetto, an overlord sends a message demanding that the vigilante be handed over, or the ghetto's residents will be killed.
32	2	"The Eye"	Sergio Mimica-Gezzan	Carol Barbee	June 29, 2014	2.96
When Tom and Weaver are released from solitary confinement, an Espheni overlord, speaking through a harnessed child, informs the residents that the food supply will cease until the vigilante is handed over. Anne and the 2nd Mass capture a skitter and learn that the Espheni plan to use the captured children as hybrids. In Chinatown, Ben learns from Dr Kadar that Lexi may be dying, and that Lourdes has prevented him from helping her. Concerned about Lexi's well-being, Ben voices his concerns and convinces her to meet him. Back in the ghetto, Tom and Hal meet with Dingaan Bootha, who tells them that he had escaped from an Espheni ghetto before. Dingaan, who has a working radio, describes his creation, the Faraday suit, which makes scaling the fence safe but only within thirty seconds. Tom decides to use the radio to contact Cochise and learns that the Espheni power source is offensive, not defensive as their past power sources, and that they know Matt's location. Dressed as the vigilante, Tom surrenders himself to the overlord and is taken aboard the ship. While there, the overlord tells him of a "great enemy" race approaching Earth, and that the Espheni have come so far from their own home to gather resources to fight them. They reveal their new plan for humanity – turning human adults into an elite front line army of skitters – and what they did to the rebel skitters. Faced with an ultimatum from the overlord to save his family, Tom takes advantage of the ensuing chaos, when the ghetto's residents launch projectiles against the ship, to examine the ghetto layout and power source. Meanwhile Ben and Maggie bond over Lexi, and Tom informs Weaver that he made a deal with the overlord. Later that night, Ben discovers a distraught Lexi talking with an overlord.
33	3	"Exodus"	Mikael Salomon	Josh Pate	July 6, 2014	2.75
Tom makes the decision to put his escape plan into action when he learns that the Espheni plan to turn humanity into Skitters. He then gathers Hal, Pope, Weaver, and Dingaan and Tector and explains that while Dingaan scales the fence in the Faraday suit, he will draw the skitters away. Hal meanwhile is tasked with leading the ghetto residents into the tunnels, and Pope and Weaver are told to cover Dingaan. The next day, Tom meets with an Overlord and a harnessed child, when he tells them that the deal they had is off, he attacks the Overlord with a flamethrower and draws the Skitters away. Dingaan meanwhile is injured, which forces Pope to wear the Faraday Suit and scale the fence to destroy the tether with the charge. Hal waits with the ghetto residents in the tunnel and is forced to defend them from incoming skitters, and Tom meanwhile draws the chasing skitters into a building covered with explosives. When Tom notices that Pope is successful in destroying the tether, he detonates the explosives and jumps into the water in triumph. Anne meanwhile collapses and dreams that she is onboard an Espheni ship while heavily pregnant, when she notices Karen and an Overlord affecting her unborn child, she despairs. At the re-education camp, Matt puts himself in danger when he covers for Mira, and is taken away by Kent Matthews. In Chinatown Maggie confronts Lexi after learning from Ben that she was talking with an Overlord, and is told that she believes it wants peace. Later that day, Anne awakens and leads the 2nd Mass to Chinatown, and reunites with Ben, Lexi and Lourdes to her delight. That night, Tom reunites with Hal, Pope and Weaver and thanks Pope for his help with the escape.
34	4	"Evolve or Die"	Bill Eagles	M. Raven Metzner	July 13, 2014	2.78
Tom and the 2nd Mass survivors arrive at the Volm hideout and are immediately met by Cochise, who introduces his second in command Shaq. When Cochise explains that they have Matt's location with the help of recon drones, Tom departs along with Weaver and Cochise leaving Hal behind in charge with orders to gather ammunition and supplies. When Hal orders that the group stay within the perimeter, Pope disobeys and leaves in a pickup truck to get the fuel. Meanwhile Tom is forced to leave Cochise behind when he is attacked by a mutated Jeanne and enters the reeducation camp along with Weaver. While inside Tom and Weaver immediately separate when the children raise the alarm, and with the help of Mira, Tom rescues Matt who is attacked by Kent Matthews. At the farm, Pope is confronted by Sara when he finds the fuel and nonchalantly agrees to have a beer with her, which is drugged. That night, Pope awakens and is forced to work with Sara to repel the Espheni mechs. When Mira distracts the skitter guards, Tom escapes along with Matt and promises to come back for them. Weaver is faced with a mutated Jeanne who dies trying to protect him and despairs. When Pope and Sara return to the warehouse, Hal confronts him, but is forced to break camp when news of a forthcoming Espheni attack breaks, leaving behind a coded message for his father. Anne, along with the 2nd Mass confront an Overlord speaking through Ben, who tells them he believes humanity can live in peace with the Espheni. They however are forced to back down when Lexi awakens her powers to protect the Overlord. Shortly afterwards, an emotional Weaver reunites with Tom, Matt and Cochise and explains what had happened to Jeanne.
35	5	"Mind Wars"	Nathaniel Goodman	Bruce Marshall Romans	July 20, 2014	2.79
Tom returns to the Volm hideout along with Matt, Weaver and Cochise and discovers a message left behind by Hal telling him where the group are headed. Meanwhile, Anne is confronted by Lexi when she learns that she had questioned the Overlord and collapses when she uses her powers. When Tom discovers a campsite occupied by two men who introduce themselves as Nick and Cooper, he is suspicious of their story and voices his concerns to Weaver. That night, Tom is abducted by the men who tell him that the Espheni have a high price on his head, and that they had killed Weaver and Matt. The next day, Weaver and Matt are able to track down the men and look on as Tom is tied up. Tom attempts to reason with Cooper and tells him about Matt and that he believes him to be a father, to which he responds that he had two sons who are now dead. Realizing that Nick was responsible for the death of his sons, Cooper shoots him dead and turns his gun on Tom, but is shot by Weaver. As Lexi's health worsens, Anne forces the Overlord to help her save Lexi and learns of a flower that calms her fever. That night, Lourdes frees the Overlord and Lexi tells Anne that it is her father.
36	6	"Door Number Three"	Jonathan Frakes	Melissa Glenn	July 27, 2014	2.65
Tom reunites with his family in Chinatown and learns that Lexi is now in a cocoon. Concerned for Lexi, Anne wants to cut her out but is stopped by Tom who warns her against acting rashly. With Dr. Kadars help, Anne decides to recall repressed memories to remember anything that may be able to help Lexi, but she is faced with painful memories of her son. Meanwhile, Maggie holds a gathering of 2nd Mass members and voices her concerns about Lexi and her powers, Tom however overhears Pope suggesting that they kill her and warns them against acting. Pope tells Tom that he believes that there is a conflict of interest going on. As he leaves, Hal tells Tom that he believes they have valid concerns about Lexi but he does not listen. Believing that he may have to use force to protect Lexi, Tom discusses the situation with Lourdes. That night, Shaq tells Hal that his recon team are retreating to a safe distance because of their concerns over Lexi. Hearing this, Pope leads an armed group towards Tom and demands access to Lexi, Tom holds firm and is able to defuse the situation. Still in a dream state, Anne meets with Lexi who shows her a childhood memory, and tells her how she choose her at the Espheni tower over Karen, and then helps her awaken. Anne immediately rushes to Lexis' side and touches the cocoon. Lexis' eyes then open.
37	7	"Saturday Night Massacre"	Olatunde Osunsanmi	David Weddle & Bradley Thompson	August 3, 2014	2.73
Lexi emerges from her cocoon and reveals to her family that she's leaving Chinatown because of her doubts about human nature. Met by Lourdes who begs her to stay, Lexi kills her through pity and leaves. The 2nd Mass are faced with news that a large Espheni force led by the scorched Overlord is gathered outside of Chinatown. Tom tells the 2nd Mass that he believes they haven't attacked with Beamers because it is personal, and then tasks them with laying traps around the area and to prepare for a ground assault. That night, Maggie uses thermite to destroy some mechs, but they are faced with tragedy when a gas explosion from a ruptured gas line kills most of the 2nd Mass. With Chinatown in ruin, Tom orders the 2nd Mass survivors to evacuate to an underground bomb shelter, and tells them that the attack won't end until the Espheni believe they are dead. Tom decides to search for any remaining members and meets up with Anne and learns that Dr. Kadar had been critically injured by a shrapnel wound and is distraught when he dies. Angered by the Scorched Overlord, Tom asks Tector for his gun but is tricked into leaving. Tector decides to dress as the Ghost and attacks the Overlord, and then blows himself up. During the skirmish, Cochise shoots down a Beamer which crashes near Tector's position. Believing Tector to be Tom, the Overlord orders a retreat. The 2nd Mass wait anxiously underground, and Tom awakens under the rubble.
38	8	"A Thing with Feathers"	David Solomon	Ryan Mottesheard	August 10, 2014	2.51
The 2nd Mass emerge from the underground shelter and search for survivors, during the search Hal discovers Maggie who is seriously injured and learns from Anne that she may be paralyzed. Meanwhile, Tom rescues Dingaan from under the rubble and together they discover the Beamer Cochise shot down and board it. Ben awakens in a Skitter Farm with Lexi and is horrified with what he sees going on. Ben tries to convince Lexi to leave with him, but she refuses, believing the Overlords to be her true family. After being unable to kill Ben, Lexi lets him go and he returns to Chinatown where he informs Anne that Lexi is lost to them for good, not knowing that his words are causing her to have some doubts. When Denny's spike fluid has no effect on Maggie's condition, Ben suggests to Anne that she implant some of his spikes into Maggie. Although concerned for both Ben and Maggie, Anne uses Volm technology to implant some of Ben's spikes into Maggie, and is successful in treating her. Inside the Beamer, Tom and Dingaan are forced to take cover when they trigger a missile, and are rescued when the explosion draws the 2nd Mass to their location. During that time, Dingaan shares his own painful past with Tom. That night, the 2nd Mass gather around a camp fire and mourn the loss of Tector and Lourdes. When the Beamer inexplicably activates, Tom and Hal notice a strange light on the moon.
39	9	"Till Death Do Us Part"	Greg Beeman	Carol Barbee	August 17, 2014	2.46
Examining the strange flashes the moon is giving off, Cochise realizes that it is the Espheni power core that the Volm have been looking for. As destroying it will wipe out all Espheni technology on Earth, Tom decides to unearth the crashed Beamer and lead a strike against the power core. To expedite matters, Tom decides to lead a small team consisting of himself, Anne, Matt, Weaver and Cochise to a Volm supply cache after learning the location from Cochise, believing that it may hold explosives that will speed up the process. When they arrive, Mira arrives and tells them that she had escaped from the Espheni camp and that she had waited for someone to appear. Tom is suspicious, believing it to be too convenient that she had appeared near to a Volm supply cache and decides to tie her up. As the air is toxic to breathe, they wear gas masks and begin to unearth the weapons. Mira however attempts to appeal to Matt telling him that she's okay and that the rope is hurting her arms. Feeling sorry for her, Matt decides to untie her but when she blows a whistle that can alert Beamers to her location, he chases after her and brings her to Tom and tells him what she had done. But before they can react Kent Matthews appears and attacks the group, Mira uses the opportunity to escape once again and is followed by Matt. Anne immediately comes to Tom's aid and distracts Matthews, to buy Tom the time to shoot him dead. Meanwhile Matt is rescued by Weaver and Cochise when he is incapacitated by some of the camp's children. The team takes out the collaborators, but a Beamer strike destroys the supply cache before they can get the explosives. With the group reunited, they decide to return to Chinatown. In Chinatown, Ben aids Maggie in adjusting to her new powers and they kiss while Pope and Sara fight and Sara leaves. That night, Tom proposes to Anne and they are married by Weaver the next morning. Shaq, having been studying Mira's whistle, is able to modify it to safely engage the buried Beamer's engines, causing it to fly itself out of the rubble.
40	10	"Drawing Straws"	Adam Kane	Josh Pate	August 24, 2014	2.56
While figuring out the Beamer's controls, the 2nd Mass receives a message that humanity is on the verge of falling and that its best to hide and survive as there seems to be no hope left. Tom refuses to give up however and convinces the 2nd Mass to continue with their mission to take out the Espheni power core, seeing it as their only chance. Tom is faced with uncertainty when the 2nd Mass demand that he offer them a vote on who should pilot the Beamer on the mission to the moon after it is discovered that Cochise cannot go on the mission due to anti-Volm defenses. Tom is initially against the idea as he believes that he should be involved, Anne however convinces him to allow anyone to place their name in contention for the role. That night, with the 2nd Mass gathered Tom draws Ben's name, and his own. Anne however believes he had rigged the draw, which Tom admits stating that he couldn't let Ben go without him. The next day, the 2nd Mass are attacked by Beamers but are saved by Lexi who destroys them with her ability after discovering that she is being used by the Espheni.
41	11	"Space Oddity"	Olatunde Osunsanmi	M. Raven Metzner	August 31, 2014	2.39
The 2nd Mass struggle with Lexi's presence in the area, believing it may be a trap. Tom does not want anything more to do with her and asks her to leave, but Anne tells him to give her a chance. Lexi tells Anne that she's sorry and admits that she was wrong about the Espheni and that she wants to make up for her mistakes. She then offers to join Tom on the mission to which Anne initially refuses but is convinced by Weaver to allow her. Faced with mistrust from all sides, Lexi joins Tom on the Beamer and unbeknownst to her, Hal gives Tom a poison to use on her just in case. As the Beamer leaves the Earths atmosphere Lexi and Tom realize that there isn't enough power to maintain life support both ways, Lexi suggests that she and Tom enter a cocoon together and tells him that it is a form of stasis. During the dream, Tom is back on Earth and seemingly the power core is destroyed and the Espheni are on the back foot, however he becomes suspicious when things are too perfect and quickly realizes that what he is seeing is not real. He then demands that Lexi release him from the dream, however she is unsure how. As they have a father-daughter moment and bond over what issues they had, they try once again and awaken and notice that they are close to the moon.
42	12	"Shoot the Moon"	Greg Beeman	David Eick	August 31, 2014	2.43
Shortly after Tom and Lexi's departure, the 2nd Mass spreads their forces thinly to defend their territory. However when Dingaan's squadron are taken down by surprise, a Beamer drops a container on the 2nd Mass containing newly developed Harnesses which are able to Skitterize humans upon contact without the need for a factory. Meanwhile as Tom and Lexi make their approach to the Moon, their payload becomes ruptured due to the hull leak. When the Espheni power core finally comes into view however, their Beamer is captured by the burnt Overlord. After a skirmish, Tom manages to inject the Volm poison into the Overlord–killing him, but not before the Overlord destroys his ship's autopilot. Seeing no other alternative to destroy the power core, Lexi opts to manually pilot the Espheni ship on a collision course with the core. Meanwhile, the 2nd Mass puts up a valiant yet hopeless fight against the Harnesses. At the same time, after Tom and Lexi say their goodbyes, they are ambushed by a squadron of Beamers. However the Volm battleship arrives and takes the Beamers out, giving Lexi the opportunity to finally destroy the power core. The resulting explosion subsequently knocks Tom's Beamer into deep space while back on Earth, the Harnesses and all Espheni technology lose their power. The next morning, the 2nd Mass regroups and Cochise brings them the news of the success of the mission but that Tom may be lost to the depths of space. Despite this, Hal rallies the 2nd Mass to finally go on the offensive against the Espheni. Elsewhere, Tom awakens in a room aboard another spaceship and encounters a new alien who he seems to be acquainted with.

== Production ==
=== Development ===
Falling Skies was renewed for a fourth season, which premiered June 22, 2014. The season consists of twelve episodes instead of the usual ten.

=== Casting ===
It was reported that Academy Award winning actress Mira Sorvino will appear in a major recurring role as a character named Sara. Sara is described as, "a woman far removed from her former life as a graphic designer who is now dogged by death at every turn, yet she has never felt more alive, free or fearless. A chance encounter with guerrilla fighter John Pope (Colin Cunningham) leads her to join the resistance and develop a strong personal bond with the outlaw-turned-warrior." Harry Potter alum Scarlett Byrne who played Pansy Parkinson was also cast in the role of Alexis "Lexi" Glass-Mason as a new series regular.

== Reception ==
=== Ratings ===
Episode number	Title	Original air date	Ratings share (Adults 18–49)	Viewers (in millions)	Rank per week on Cable
1	"Ghost in the Machine"	June 22, 2014	1.0	3.67	#6
2	"The Eye"	June 29, 2014	0.8	2.96	#11
3	"Exodus"	July 6, 2014	0.8	2.75	#12
4	"Evolve or Die"	July 13, 2014	0.8	2.78	#12
5	"Mind Wars"	July 20, 2014	0.8	2.79	—N/a
6	"Door Number Three"	July 27, 2014	0.7	2.65	—N/a
7	"Saturday Night Massacre" p0-	August 3, 2014	0.7	2.73	—N/a
8	"A Thing With Feathers"	August 10, 2014	0.6	2.51	—N/a
9	"Till Death Do Us Part"	August 17, 2014	0.7	2.46	—N/a
10	"Drawing Straws"	August 24, 2014	0.7	2.56	—N/a
11	"Space Oddity"	August 31, 2014	0.5	2.39	—N/a
12	"Shoot the Moon"	August 31, 2014	0.5	2.43	—N/a
