= List of The Librarians episodes =

The Librarians is an American fantasy adventure television series developed by John Rogers that premiered on TNT on December 7, 2014. It is a direct continuation of the series of three television films (2004–2008).

In March 2018, Dean Devlin announced that TNT had cancelled the series after four seasons. During the course of the series, 42 episodes of The Librarians aired, concluding on February 7, 2018.

== Series overview ==
Season	Episodes	Originally released	
Season	Episodes	First released	Last released
1	10	December 7, 2014	January 18, 2015
2	10	November 1, 2015	December 27, 2015
3	10	November 20, 2016	January 22, 2017
4	12	December 13, 2017	February 7, 2018

== Episodes ==
=== Season 1 (2014–15) ===
No. overall	No. in season	Title	Directed by	Written by	Original release date	US viewers (millions)
1	1	"And the Crown of King Arthur"	Dean Devlin	John Rogers	December 7, 2014	5.35
NATO anti-terror agent Eve Baird meets Flynn Carsen during a mission in Berlin, and, on her return to the United States, is invited to join the Library as the Guardian, tasked with protecting the Librarian. Despite Flynn's resistance, she works with him to investigate the murders of several former Librarian candidates, and they rescue three who are still alive: mathematician Cassandra Cillian, art expert Jacob Stone, and thief Ezekiel Jones. With their help, Flynn and Eve link the murders to the Library's ancient enemy, the Serpent Brotherhood, and prevent them from stealing the crown of King Arthur from a stonehenge like circle in the Black Forest of Germany. When they return to the Library, however, Cassandra betrays them and leads the Brotherhood to the Library. When Flynn intervenes, a Brotherhood lieutenant, Lamia (Lesley-Ann Brandt), stabs him with Arthur's sword, Excalibur. As the Librarians escape, Judson, the head of the Library, and his assistant Charlene cast a spell to seal off the alternate dimension where the Library resides.
2	2	"And the Sword in the Stone"	Dean Devlin	John Rogers	December 7, 2014	5.35
As the Library begins to seal itself off, Eve, Jake, Ezekiel, and a mortally-wounded Flynn exit through a door to a remote forest in Oregon, where they meet Judson's old friend Jenkins, who runs a still-active annex of the Library in Portland. As his wounds cannot be treated, Flynn commits himself to spending his last day preparing the others to take over for him, meaning that the Library will have multiple Librarians officially protecting it for the first time. They track Lamia and the Brotherhood to a Roman crypt beneath Buckingham Palace, where the latter plan to perform a ritual that will flood the world with magic. With Cassandra's help, the group regains control of both the crown and Excalibur, though not before Lamia manages to complete the ritual. Using what little magic Excalibur has left, Cassandra heals Flynn instead of using it to eliminate her tumor. Eve begins to develop feelings for him, and they share a kiss before he leaves the group to search for a way to restore the main Library.
3	3	"And the Horns of a Dilemma"	Marc Roskin	Jeremy Bernstein	December 14, 2014	3.37
Eve works to train the Librarians as soldiers, but is continuously frustrated by their lack of experience. Against her wishes, they head to Boston to investigate the disappearance of several interns at a prominent agribusiness firm. Eve becomes suspicious after meeting with the CEO, Karen Willis (Tricia Helfer), and breaks into the server room, where she finds a collection of artifacts. Stone deduces that the firm is using the artifacts to create a labyrinth, complete with a captive minotaur (Tyler Mane). Willis reveals that the company is in fact the last remnants of the Minoan monarchy, having survived for centuries on the power of the labyrinth. Ezekiel and Cassandra are able to deactivate the artifact room, allowing the minotaur to take its revenge on Willis. Eve concludes that the best way to manage the Librarians is to let them gain experience on their own terms.
4	4	"And Santa's Midnight Run"	Jonathan Frakes	Paul Guyot & John Rogers	December 21, 2014	3.19
The Librarians learn that Santa Claus (Bruce Campbell) has disappeared hours before Christmas. Jenkins explains that Santa is an "immortal avatar" who spends the year collecting goodwill; if he does not return it by the stroke of midnight, the world will fall into chaos. The team heads to London, where they find that the Serpent Brotherhood has poisoned him with mistletoe, causing him to become Sinterklaas and then Odin. They attempt to fly him out to the aurora borealis in Alaska so that he can finish his work, but are ambushed by Lamia and Dulaque (Matt Frewer), the leader of the Brotherhood. Dulaque throws himself out of the plane, but Jenkins admits that he will survive. Santa explains that Eve, having been born at the exact hour of Christmas Eve (hence her name), is the only one who can restore hope to the world, and despite her dislike for Christmas, she agrees to do so.
5	5	"And the Apple of Discord"	Marc Roskin	Paul Guyot & Geoffrey Thorne	December 28, 2014	4.10
Flynn returns with troubling news: the Eastern dragons are threatening war unless a missing treasure is returned. The Librarians travel to a dragon lair under Vatican City, where they discover that the Brotherhood is using the dispute to persuade an important meeting of the supernatural community to dismantle the Library. The treasure, which turns out to be the Apple of Discord, corrupts both Jake and Cassandra before Flynn takes it back to the Library, where he (with the help of Ezekiel and Jenkins) convinces the delegates to maintain the Library as a check on the abuse of magic. Eve accepts Flynn's offer to make her a full Guardian, but disagrees with his plan to stay in Portland. Realizing that he still has to find the Library, Flynn departs once again.
6	6	"And the Fables of Doom"	Jonathan Frakes	Kate Rorick	January 4, 2015	3.72
Near a small town in Washington, a truck is thrown off a bridge by a giant hand. The Librarians investigate and discover a large statue under the bridge, which they identify as a troll. They also discover that many of the town's residents are being turned into characters from popular fairy tales. It turns out that the town librarian (René Auberjonois) has been using an enchanted story book to become immortal by reading it to a young girl and draining her spirit, bringing the stories to life in the process. The Librarians themselves fall victim, with Cassandra becoming Prince Charming, Eve a princess, Jacob the Huntsman, and Ezekiel turning into Jack. Ezekiel persuades the girl to wish for a happy ending, imprisoning the librarian inside the book and undoing his magic. It is subsequently revealed that Cassandra, having briefly gained the ability to use sorcery, has retained some of her powers.
7	7	"And the Rule of Three"	Marc Roskin	Paul Guyot & Kate Rorick	January 11, 2015	3.44
The clipping book sends the Librarians to a Chicago-area science fair, where strange incidents linked to magic have occurred. While the others, posing as judges, investigate the fair, Eve confronts the host (Alicia Witt), who Jenkins exposes as the sorceress Morgan le Fay. Morgan explains that she has given the students an app that allows them to place curses on their competitors, forming an improvised coven that she can draw on to replenish her powers. Eve manages to temporarily strip her of her immortality using the app, but is forced to let her escape when the building magical backlash threatens to cause a major disaster. Using the expertise of a sympathetic student (Bex Taylor-Klaus), the Librarians are able to craft a Faraday cage to dispel the backlash. Before vanishing, Morgan taunts Eve with the knowledge that an unknown calamity will soon fall upon the Library. She leaves Eve with a Latin warning for Jenkins (whom she calls Galeas): "Don't fear the villain, fear the hero".
8	8	"And the Heart of Darkness"	John Harrison	Geoffrey Thorne	January 11, 2015	2.86
While inspecting ley lines in Slovakia for disturbances, the Librarians run into a teenage girl named Katie (Lea Zawada), who begs them to save her friends from a nearby house. Eve takes Jake and Ezekiel to investigate, leaving Cassandra to watch Katie. Jenkins suggests that the "house" may be one of several magical shelters that occasionally appear to either help or harm travelers. Inside the house (which Stone identifies as 19th-century American frontier), the three are attacked by a shadowy entity and imprisoned inside a dollhouse. Cassandra discovers that the entity is trying to protect them from Katie; after her family discovered the house centuries ago, she banished them and took control of the house, using it to prey on strangers. Cassandra overpowers and turns Katie to dust, releasing her friends and restoring the house's original caretaker spirit, who wishes them well as they return home.
9	9	"And the City of Light"	Tawnia McKiernan	John Rogers & Jeremy Bernstein	January 18, 2015	3.27
The Librarians visit a small town in upstate New York where a UFO researcher has disappeared. They eventually discover the town's secret: An experimental Wireless grid built by Nikola Tesla in 1915 trapped the town's original inhabitants in a pocket dimension, from which they can influence the modern world only by temporarily taking over the bodies of others, including the missing researcher. The town leader, Mabel Collins (Haley Webb), who bonds with Stone over their shared experiences of isolation, reveals that Tesla designed a capacitor to reverse the experiment, and the Librarians help her restart it after Eve becomes stuck in the dimension as well. At the last second, they abort the procedure to prevent a Tunguska-level explosion, releasing Eve but removing Mabel's immortality, causing her to age and die. The other townspeople remain trapped, and Jenkins estimates that it will take another century before they can be found again, which he and Eve list as a priority for future Librarians.
10	10	"And the Loom of Fate"	Jonathan Frakes	John Rogers	January 18, 2015	3.03
Flynn returns to the Library, having gathered an assortment of artifacts to restore the Library. However, Dulaque interferes and acquires the Loom of Fate, which he uses to rewrite history and prevent the downfall of Camelot. This sends Eve into an alternate timeline where Flynn did not become a Librarian. Together, the two make their way through other worlds created by the Loom, where they encounter alternate versions of Cassandra, Ezekiel, and Jake, all of whom have replaced Flynn in their timelines. Cassandra, having fully developed her powers of sorcery, sends Eve and Flynn to the River of Time, where they encounter Jenkins confronting a younger and armored Dulaque (Jerry O'Connell), who reveals that he is Lancelot du Lac and Jenkins Galahad, two of the legendary Knights of the Round Table. While Eve and Jenkins fight Lancelot, Flynn uses the Loom to fix history and send the three back to the Library in time to save Eve from a mortal wound. As a reward for their service, Jenkins entrusts the Librarians with their own clipping books. While the others go on their first unsupervised mission, Flynn invites Baird on a "first date", taking her through a portal to an unknown place.

=== Season 2 (2015) ===
No. overall	No. in season	Title	Directed by	Written by	Original release date	US viewers (millions)
11	1	"And the Drowned Book"	Marc Roskin	John Rogers & Paul Guyot	November 1, 2015	2.25
Since Lancelot's defeat, the Librarians have gone their separate ways. Several months later, at a museum exhibition in New York City, they reunite after retrieving different artifacts on behalf of a mysterious client. The client turns out to be Moriarty, who has gathered the artifacts for his master, the wizard Prospero, who intends to undo the ending of The Tempest (where he voluntarily gave up his powers) by regaining his staff and book. Prospero has his servant Ariel create a massive hurricane which the Librarians are able to dispel, but he and Moriarty escape. Jenkins explains that the two are Fictionals, characters from classic literature who have managed to escape from their stories, and that their actions are largely dictated by how those same stories were originally written.
12	2	"And the Broken Staff"	Marc Roskin	Alexa Alemanni & Joe Boothe & Holly Moyer	November 1, 2015	1.95
Using the stolen artifacts, Prospero and Moriarty access the Library so that they can forge a new staff from the Tree of Knowledge. To distract the Librarians, they release the Queen of Hearts and Frankenstein's monster from their stories. The team works together to contain the damage, banishing the new Fictionals while securing several scattered artifacts. Flynn uses the Bolt of Zeus to destroy the Tree of Knowledge, while Eve uses Ariel as a bargaining chip to force Moriarty to leave. Flynn later admits that he did not destroy the actual Tree of Knowledge, but isn't sure which one he did destroy. Jenkins discovers that a number of the Library's treasures have vanished for unexplained reasons, and Flynn sets out to find them.
13	3	"And What Lies Beneath the Stones"	Marc Roskin	Alexa Alemanni & Joe Boothe	November 8, 2015	1.95
In Oklahoma, while laying a new pipeline, the company owned by Jake's father, Isaac (Jeff Fahey), accidentally releases an ancient spirit that feeds on lies and deceit. The lies Isaac told in order to get authorization to dig near a Choctaw burial ground give the entity the strength to escape just as the Librarians arrive posing as archeologists. Jake, who has kept his intelligence (not to mention his academic and intellectual achievements) secret from his alcoholic, demanding, contemptuous father, pretends to be Ezekiel's assistant. The entity, a shape-shifter, disguises itself as different people, trying to get its prison destroyed. Jake tells his father the truth about himself, but when Isaac says that he loves him, Jake recognizes the shapeshifter and pulls him down to the cavern. There, having learned that the entity's weakness is the truth, the Librarians confess their secrets to each other, binding it and allowing them to seal it away for good. Jake decides to start publishing his work under his own name instead of one of his seven aliases.
14	4	"And the Cost of Education"	Courtney Rowe	Kate Rorick	November 15, 2015	1.89
A missing-persons case brings Eve and the team to Wexler University, founded by a 19th-century occultist and the inspiration for H. P. Lovecraft's fictional Miskatonic University. There, they meet Lucy Lyons (Kasha Kropinski), a student who has been conducting experiments to determine whether or not magic is real. She explains that strange disappearances happen all the time on campus, and that no one bothers to investigate them. Stone gets into an argument with a professor, who is subsequently dragged away by a Lovecraftian entity. The team discovers that Lucy has accidentally summoned the creature through her experiments, but she is taken before they can act. As the entity targets anyone engaged in displays of hubris, Stone and Ezekiel trick it into opening a portal, which Cassandra enters to save Lucy. Before she can return herself, she is contacted by the Lady of the Lake (Beth Riesgraf), the leader of an all-female group dedicated to mastering science and magic. She offers Cassandra a chance to join, but she declines. Lucy drops out of Wexler to continue her studies, while Cassandra and Jenkins argue over whether or not the Librarians should be using magic rather than locking it away.
15	5	"And the Hollow Men"	Noah Wyle	Geoffrey Thorne	November 22, 2015	2.10
During a mission to recover the Eye of Zarathustra, the team encounters Flynn, only to be rendered unconscious by a spell. Flynn wakes up in the custody of Ray (Drew Powell), a traveler who wants Flynn to help him recover his memories. The team tracks them down, but Ray escapes just as Moriarty and his thugs arrive. A portal failure leaves him and Eve stranded together, and they agree to a temporary truce in order to find Flynn. Flynn realizes that Ray is a spirit of the Library, and that he has all of the missing artifacts. Using the Eye, the two access a Sumerian temple in rural Pennsylvania, where they find the Staff of Zarathustra. Ray is overcome by the Staff's power, forcing Eve to leave it with Moriarty so that they can focus on getting him back to the Library. Flynn, being dutiful as he is always, puts his personal feelings aside and immediately resumes his hunt for Prospero.
16	6	"And the Infernal Contract"	Jonathan Frakes	Paul Guyot & Holly Moyer	November 29, 2015	2.02
As a personal favor to Sam Denning (Michael Trucco), an old friend of hers from her military days and a mayoral candidate in his small New Hampshire town, Eve looks into the death of one of his staffers. The others arrive, having uncovered a supernatural link to the killing. Denning's opponent, who comes from a prominent local family, is revealed to have a contract with Mephistopheles (John DeLancie), who has been benefitting the family for years by causing terrible disasters that allow them to increase their power and influence. Eve steals the contract, but Sam betrays her and makes a deal of his own to trigger a natural gas explosion so that he can become a hero. With the other Librarians coming close to signing the contract as well, Eve tricks Mephistopheles into breaking his agreement by rendering himself mortal. Jenkins explains that a Guardian's job is not to protect the lives of Librarians; it's to protect their souls.
17	7	"And the Image of Image"	Emile Levisetti	Paul Guyot	December 6, 2015	2.24
The Librarians look into a popular London nightclub, where a number of patrons have suffered from mysterious accidents and overdoses. The club's owner turns out to be Dorian Gray, who has placed an enchantment on his painting that allows it to absorb the life energy of his patrons, ensuring that both it and him will always be beautiful. Jenkins reveals that Dorian is not a Fictional, but a real person, and that he knew him back when Oscar Wilde was writing his story. Stone and Ezekiel find the painting and destroy it, but Eve realizes that he has another, a digital version composed of hundreds of photographs of the patrons, one of whom is Cassandra. Ezekiel replaces the portrait with one of Eve made up of Dorian's pictures, giving her a brief period of immortality, which she uses to commit suicide and turn Dorian into dust.
18	8	"And the Point of Salvation"	Jonathan Frakes	Jeremy Bernstein	December 13, 2015	2.21
A DARPA facility builds an experimental quantum computer powered by a mystical stone from Atlantis, which malfunctions during a test. The Librarians arrive just as the system overloads, severing their connection to the Library. As the group struggles to find a way out, Jones discovers that they are trapped in a simulation of a video game, with checkpoints, enemies, obstacles, item pickups, and timed events. Furthermore, the computer has placed the Librarians into a time loop, meaning every time they fail, they start at the beginning. As only he has any memories of what is happening, Ezekiel forces himself to repeat the loop over and over again until he can find a way out. Eventually, he manages to exploit a glitch in the game to get the others out, then kills himself to break the loop. The team briefly restarts the computer to revive him, but he appears to have no memories of his actions. Meanwhile, an increasingly desperate Jenkins summons Puck to ask when Prospero will strike next. The answer is: “Now!” Before Jenkins can warn the others, he suddenly forgets what he's doing and closes the Library for the night.
19	9	"And the Happily Ever Afters"	Rod Hardy	Geoffrey Thorne & Jeremy Bernstein	December 20, 2015	1.94
Flynn returns to the Library to find his team missing, with Jenkins having no memory of ever meeting them. Using the clipping book, Flynn transports himself to their last known location: a small town on an island in Puget Sound. There, he finds them living alternate lives: Baird is the sheriff, with Moriarty (the mayor) as her fiancee, Stone is a respected professor and archeologist, Jones is an FBI agent, and Cassandra is a retired astronaut and TV personality. Carsen tries to convince them that their world is a fantasy, to no avail. With Jenkins's help, Flynn tracks down Ariel, who has assumed a human form (Hayley McLaughlin), and binds her. She agrees to help them reverse her spell, as long as they agree to free her from Prospero's control. Prospero tempts them with false promises of fame and glory, which they reject. Upon returning to Portland, Eve finds Flynn in possession of Prospero's pocket watch, which he destroys to free Ariel. Jenkins greets them with the revelation that they have been gone for three weeks, during which Prospero has "supercharged" all of the world's ley lines using the Staff.
20	10	"And the Final Curtain"	Marc Roskin	John Rogers & Paul Guyot	December 27, 2015	2.24
Using his new-found power, Prospero begins reversing the history of civilization, eliminating electrification and turning cities into forests. Using an unstable time machine, Flynn and Eve send themselves to Wilton House in 1611, while the others travel to the house in the present. After stopping a rogue Moriarty from murdering Shakespeare, the duo discover that instead of The Tempest, his new work is The Triumph of Prospero. During a public reading, Shakespeare is suddenly possessed by Prospero, who intends to use his magic to conquer the world. Eve and Flynn recover Excalibur and use it to break Prospero's staff. Back in the present, the Librarians use clues and items left by Flynn to trap Prospero and exorcise him, returning Shakespeare to normal. A time rift opens that allows him to return to 1611, but leaves Flynn and Eve unable to return to their own time. Flynn has Shakespeare cast a spell that turns him and Eve into statues (mirroring the end of The Winter's Tale) and make arrangements for them to be stored in the Library, awakening 400 years later when the others find them. Flynn and Eve share one final kiss as they ponder what the future holds.

=== Season 3 (2016–17) ===
No. overall	No. in season	Title	Directed by	Written by	Original release date	US viewers (millions)
21	1	"And the Rise of Chaos"	Dean Devlin	Marco Schnabel & Dean Devlin	November 20, 2016	1.89
The Egyptian god of chaos, Apep, is released from his imprisonment in the Great Pyramid of Giza by a Navy veteran visiting a museum exhibit, whose body he subsequently possesses. The Librarians track him to the Boston Science Museum, where he uses an old submarine to open a pathway to an ancient shrine that prevents the realms of evil and chaos from overtaking the world. When the group tries to stop him from unlocking the shrine, he uses his powers to turn them against each other, which they counteract by singing in harmony. Shortly thereafter, agents of an anti-magic government division, DOSA, arrive and place the Librarians under arrest. Apep subdues them with his power when they make contact with him, allowing the group to escape while the veteran, who has no memories of his actions as Apep, is taken away to be interrogated by the head of DOSA, Cynthia Rockwell (Vanessa Williams).
22	2	"And the Fangs of Death"	Marc Roskin	Rob Wright	November 27, 2016	1.62
After having a dream of the world ending, Carsen seeks out his old friend Charlene (Jane Curtin), who has retired to a remote Incan temple and wants nothing to do with the Library. When Flynn explains that Apep has returned, however, she agrees to leave with them. The next day, the two wake up to find her servants dead and Charlene missing. Using a pendant Flynn gave her as a gift, the Librarians follow her trail to a supercollider facility in Alberta, where a failed experiment has allowed Apep to summon the Egyptian god of death, Anubis, who has turned most of the facility's workers and guards into werewolves. While Flynn and the team work with the surviving crew to close the portal, Jenkins and Eve encounter Apep in the body of a perimeter guard, who leads them to the portal. With Ezekiel turning into a werewolf, Flynn, Jake, and Cassandra seal the portal, returning Anubis and his followers to the land of the dead while Apep escapes. Having confirmed that Charlene was not responsible for helping Apep in the first place, Flynn sets out to find her, as she is the only individual besides Judson who knows how to defeat him.
23	3	"And the Reunion of Evil"	Noah Wyle	Kate Rorick	December 4, 2016	1.87
Jake and Cassandra are sent to retrieve a crystal from an ice cave in Sweden. Against Jake's warnings not to rely on magic, Cassandra uses a spell to free the crystal, which seals itself within her body as Jake fights off a masked man looking for the cave. They find a remote hotel to shelter in, but the receptionist demands that they leave due to the hotel hosting a private reunion. They soon learn that the "reunion" is actually a peace summit between warring clans of Frost Giants who intend to seal their alliance by feasting on the crystal's power. Posing as a giant, Jake is exposed when the real one arrives and he is tied up while the giants prepare to devour Cassandra. Using Cassandra's magic and some help from the Library, the two escape. The giants start fighting amongst themselves, causing the hotel to vanish. Meanwhile, Jenkins and Eve try to teach Ezekiel some responsibility by having him care for an egg entrusted to the Library by the Loch Ness Monster.
24	4	"And the Self-Fulfilling Prophecy"	Dean Devlin	Tom MacRae	December 11, 2016	1.76
Eve, Jake, and Ezekiel wake up to find themselves soaking wet and in a strange room filled with Greek symbols. With them are a student, principal, and cleaning lady from a high school in Seattle. Through investigation, they deduce that they were searching the school for magic after Baird had a prophecy of her death at the hands of the Reaper, an immortal being who only kills at a predetermined time. The Librarians eventually discover that the school's swimming team had been using mystical water from Greece to grant themselves incredible luck, unaware that the water was actually taken from the Oracle of Delphi, who turns out to be disguised as the cleaning lady. The Oracle explains that she had a vision of her own death and sought to prevent it by summoning the Reaper to kill Eve instead. Using morse code, Eve has Jenkins toss the cube through a portal to Australia, breaking the prophecy. The Reaper turns on the Oracle, destroying her before informing Eve that she is released from her fate.
25	5	"And the Tears of a Clown"	Jonathan Frakes	Steve Kriozere & Mark A. Altman	December 18, 2016	1.86
After receiving a warning from Eve, Jenkins tracks her and the Librarians to a carnival in Iowa, where they have been magically transformed into performers. Upon being freed from the spell and having their memories restored, they recall that they had gone there to investigate a case regarding a juggler before being captured. Posing as clowns, they return and look into the carnival owner, Kirby Goulding (Sean Astin), a magician who has gained control of real magic through a new artifact. He has been using the carnival to track down his childhood sweetheart Charlotte (Felicia Day) to perform an "Ascension" (a trick conceived by Harry Houdini) and send the carnival into another dimension. The Librarians try to steal his wand, which they mistake for the artifact, but are eventually caught and sentenced to be turned into wax statues. Stone deduces that the magician's real artifact is his flower, which Charlotte steals. Ezekiel uses it to lure him into the wax vat, erasing him and the carnival from existence. Jenkins and Eve place the flower in a wing of the Library dedicated to storing new artifacts, while DOSA agents retrieve pictures of the Librarians from the carnival's former location.
26	6	"And the Trial of the Triangle"	Jonathan Frakes	Noah Wyle	December 25, 2016	1.65
The Librarians stage an intervention for Flynn, who has become obsessed with finding the Eye of Ra, the only artifact that can defeat Apep. With their help, he discovers that the Eye was among a collection of Egyptian treasures aboard the Tibbar, a ship that disappeared in the Bermuda Triangle in 1886 along with the Librarian of the moment. Not wanting to risk the lives of the others, Flynn tricks them into leaving him behind while evacuating a flight being sucked into the Triangle and enters it himself. There, he finds that the missing Librarian intentionally stranded himself within the Triangle, creating a world based on the stories of Lewis Carroll to protect the Eye. He gives it to Flynn, but warns that a life must be sacrificed to use its power, which Flynn and Jenkins decide to hide from the Librarians. A DOSA agent who had been following the group is sent back after having his memories wiped, interrupting a meeting led by Rockwell.
27	7	"And the Curse of Cindy"	Nina Lopez-Corrado	Gareth Roberts	January 1, 2017	1.78
The Librarians investigate a mysterious cult centered around Cindy Kroger, a washed-up reality show contestant who has devised a way to make everyone worship her. After both Flynn and Stone succumb to her magic, Jenkins deduces that Cindy is using a powerful love potion made from her tears. Furthermore, with the help of some controlled DOSA personnel, she intends to launch a potion-based chemical weapon that will put millions more under her influence. Ezekiel, who is supposedly immune to the potion because of his true love for himself, convinces her to stop the launch, only to discover that her potioneer Agnes intends to take her place. Jenkins arrives at the last second with an antidote, but Apep, who had been controlling Agnes all along, escapes. Ezekiel shares a kiss with Cindy as Apep returns to his sarcophagus, which is already in DOSA custody. Stone explains to Ezekiel that he wasn't immune because he loved himself but because he already had feelings for Cindy after watching her reality show.
28	8	"And the Eternal Question"	Noah Wyle	Kate Rorick & Nicole Ranadive	January 8, 2017	2.05
In South Carolina, a golfer and his wife both die from spontaneous combustion. While Eve leaves with Flynn on a "secret mission" (which turns out to be a date), Stone, Ezekiel, and Cassandra trace the incident to a spa run by a family of Spanish immigrants, who they soon realize are vampires. Cassandra, who has recently learned that her tumor has become terminal, bonds with one of them, Estrella, who offers to grant her immortality. Meanwhile, Stone and Ezekiel learn that the spa is built on soil full of rare meteor fragments, which Estrella's brother Tomas intends to distill into an elixir that will allow the vampires to walk in the sunlight away from the resort. With Jenkins' help, they destroy him and his followers. Cassandra collapses soon after and is taken to the hospital, where she undergoes surgery. Upon awakening, she discovers that the removal of the tumor has not only left her mathematical abilities intact, but also given her the power to communicate mentally.
29	9	"And the Fatal Separation"	Jonathan Frakes	Rob Wright & Steve Kriozere & Mark A. Altman	January 15, 2017	1.60
During Stone's trip to Shangri-La to train under the Monkey King (Ernie Reyes Jr.), the city is raided by collector Sterling Lam, who seizes Monkey's prized staff for himself. Disguised as mercenaries, Ezekiel and Cassandra sneak the rest of the team into the city, but they are quickly subdued by Monkey, who is now under Lam's control. While escaping from his treasure room, Flynn and Stone discover Charlene and spring her from captivity. Fearing that Apep will use her to access the Library, Charlene reveals that she plans to give up her immortality, which Flynn opposes. Baird meets with her mentor Rockwell, who explains that she is, in fact, a sleeper agent, albeit an unwilling one. With Charlene's help, Flynn defeats Lam and passes the staff to Stone, who returns it to Monkey. Grateful, Monkey gifts him with a spell that can "bring light where there is darkness." Back at the Library, Jenkins professes his love for Charlene before sending her to join Judson in an alternate dimension.
30	10	"And the Wrath of Chaos"	Marc Roskin	Marco Schnabel	January 22, 2017	1.97
Baird gives Rockwell access to the Library in return for allowing her team to go free. She also acquires intelligence on the location of a mystical dreamcatcher within Mount Rushmore, which turns out to be a diversion planted by DOSA so that they can weaken the Library's defenses. Baird leads them to the treasure vault, where Rockwell turns Jenkins to stone using Medusa's head. Flynn sends the group to rescue him while he works to sabotage DOSA's efforts. They free him, but Apep soon escapes from Rockwell's custody and takes control of her body. Baird reveals that she and Flynn have been playing Apep from the beginning in order to vanquish him with the Eye of Ra. Apep detonates a bomb of pure evil inside the Library's catacombs and assumes a spectral form. Flynn uses the Eye to absorb Apep's power while Stone, Cassandra, and Ezekiel use their gifts to render him mortal, causing him to be consumed as the Eye's sacrifice. Rockwell agrees to return all of the artifacts to the Library and the Librarians resume their normal duties.

=== Season 4 (2017–18) ===
No. overall	No. in season	Title	Directed by	Written by	Original release date	US viewers (millions)
31	1	"And the Dark Secret"	Marc Roskin	Marco Schnabel	December 13, 2017	1.68
When one of the four cornerstones of the Library of Alexandria turns up, the Librarians must find the others before the Library is destroyed forever by a church sect led by Monsignor Vega (John Noble) that wants the world to return to the Dark Ages. Jenkins reveals that Nicole Noone (Rachel Nichols), Flynn's original guardian, is alive and has been locked up in a secret part of the library. After being sent 500 years into the past on her last mission with Flynn, she became immortal and hid the cornerstones. Stone, Cassandra, and Ezekiel travel to the Palais Garnier in Paris and find the third stone, but they are captured by Vega. Meanwhile, Nicole leads Flynn and Baird to the last cornerstone, which Baird retrieves, before they are lured into a trap by Vega. However, he cannot use the stones on his own, so Nicole offers to help destroy the library. She activates the cornerstones, creating a vortex, and the Library starts to fall apart. Nicole then throws one of the stones into the vortex, which pulls both her and Vega inside. Flynn jumps into the vortex and rescues Nicole, who then escapes. Also, in order to remain a force for good, the Library needs to be tethered to humanity via a "tethering ceremony" presided over by Jenkins that will make Flynn and Baird immortal like Judson and Charlene, so the Librarians are currently rehearsing, but Flynn now has doubts about the Library.
32	2	"And the Steal of Fortune"	Eriq La Salle	Gary Rosen	December 13, 2017	1.36
Stone and Ezekiel visit Stone's friend Slayton at Fortune Downs, a casino and racetrack, where they discover people are having unusually horrible luck, so the Librarians investigate. The casino's new owner, crime boss Bennie Konopka (Richard Kind), has made a deal with Fortuna (Sunny Mabrey), the Roman goddess of fortune, who has returned to steal everyone's luck. The only way to defeat her is to hack the casino so everyone wins despite the curse, turning Fortuna back to a statue. Meanwhile, Flynn tries to prepare the Librarians for his absence.
33	3	"And the Christmas Thief"	Noah Wyle	Nicole Ranadive	December 20, 2017	1.48
Santa Claus leaves his sleigh in the Library while he and his elves go on vacation with Flynn, Eve, and Jenkins. Ezekiel visits his adoptive mother and sisters, who are small-time thieves. Annoyed by their teasing, he takes his mother Lenore (Gia Carides) to the Library, where she steals the magic door. Ezekiel, Cassie, and Jacob use Santa's sleigh to track her down. They find out she's been using the door to steal Christmas presents from around the world, including a painting from the vault in the Bank of Thieves. While they're returning it, the Saint of Thieves (Steven Weber) catches Ezekiel and his mother, forcing Lenore to spill the truth. He appropriates Santa's sleigh, which he wishes to destroy to get back at his brother, Santa. Cassie calls Jenkins, who steps through the repaired door with a note from Santa, gifting his brother the sleigh. Since he can only accept stolen gifts, the sleigh is now safe from him; in his anger, he regresses into a child. Ezekiel then takes his mother on the sleigh to return all the gifts she stole.
34	4	"And the Silver Screen"	Jonathan Frakes	Noah Wyle	December 20, 2017	1.40
While going to see a revival screening of an old film, Baird and Flynn get trapped inside the film as the main leads. The narrative won't advance without them enacting all the scenes, but the film has a different ending than the one everyone knows. When Jacob, Cassie, and Ezekiel arrive to help, they are transported into the other films playing at the theater.
35	5	"And the Bleeding Crown"	Marc Roskin	Tom MacRae	December 27, 2017	1.82
Everyone in a small town becomes a senior citizen. While investigating, the Librarians meet an old Librarian from the 1880s, Darrington Dare. His old nemesis, Ambrose Gethik, jumped into the future with a plan that could only be found at this point in time. Darrington tells Flynn that there can only be one Librarian or the Librarians will tear each other apart.
36	6	"And the Graves of Time"	Jonathan Frakes	Marco Schnabel & Larry Stuckey	December 27, 2017	1.52
Eve Baird goes to find Nicole Noone to learn why she no longer wants to stay with the Library. However, Russian goons have been raiding Nicole's old graves to find a key that would lead to Koschei's Needle, a very powerful artifact that can slay a nation or an immortal. Flynn and Jenkins go to find the two Guardians and the artifact. Rasputin, under the guise of a descendant of the Romanovs, grabs the needle and stabs Noone, restoring his youth, but dies after stabbing a pipe full of radiation. Jenkins sacrifices his immortality to restore Noone and Flynn, after his talks with Noone, decides to resign from the Library.
37	7	"And the Disenchanted Forest"	Dean Devlin	Nicole Ranadive & Gary Rosen	January 3, 2018	1.25
Following Flynn's departure, Baird takes the remaining Librarians to a corporate team-building camp run by Robbie Bender (T. J. Ramini) that was indicated by the clipping book. It turns out many of the campers have disappeared under mysterious circumstances, but the camp organizer simply calls them quitters. Jacob falls for one of the counselors, Sarina (Dilshad Vadsaria), who is actually a reporter fired for writing about the Library. They discover the forest has been kidnapping people to find a translator for the forest language, a job for which Stone is perfectly suited. In order to preserve the Grandfather Tree, from which all other forests are born, the forest gives the Librarians a golden pine cone which can rebuild the forest.
38	8	"And the Hidden Sanctuary"	Noah Wyle	Kate Rorick	January 10, 2018	1.41
After a mission in Ecuador goes badly, Cassandra decides to go to Havenport, Ohio, the safest city in the US, for a while. The town was getting ready to celebrate 10,000 days without any sort of accident. However, despite trying to live a normal life, she eventually gets dragged into solving the mystery of why this town is so impossibly safe with the aid of her landlady's son, Freddy. It seems a fairy was trapped in a snow globe, forced to keep everyone in town safe.
39	9	"And a Town Called Feud"	Valerie Weiss	Tom MacRae	January 17, 2018	1.34
Eve, Jacob, and Ezekiel investigate ghost appearances in the town Feud, famed for its legend of two brothers who joined opposite sides in the Civil War and killed each other. At the town museum, they meet Janet Hedge (Nora Dunn), who has found a long-lost locket. Meanwhile Cassandra and Jenkins look into the history of the two brother Librarians whose own quarrel supposedly resulted in the Dark Ages, hoping to prove wrong Darrington's assertion there can only be one Librarian at a time. Eve and the others learn that the legend is wrong and the Civil War brothers actually reconciled before dying in a bomb blast, but Cassandra and Jenkins discover the Librarian brothers' feud really did cause the Dark Ages because they put their own egos ahead of their service to the Library. Based on their experiences, Jacob and Ezekiel, who had agreed with Darrington's view, now reject it, while Cassie and Jenkins, who had rejected the idea, now accept it.
40	10	"And Some Dude Named Jeff"	Lindy Booth	Marco Schnabel	January 24, 2018	1.35
As Eve and the Librarians leave the Library on a mission, Jenkins opens a teleportation door for them as usual. Unknown to them, Jenkins has switched bodies with a bumbling young man named Jeff (Andrew Caldwell). The real Jenkins wakes up at Jeff's residence, and his attempts to get back in the Library fail until he confides in Jeff's friends and coworkers, a group of Dungeons and Dragons enthusiasts. They help him work his way back through the traps and challenges of the Library's back door. Meanwhile, the Librarians grow suspicious of Jeff-as-Jenkins, who confesses making the switch with a chance-acquired grimoire. Unfortunately, the book was the prison of Asmodeus, Duke of Hell. Using it weakened the spell binding him and he is now at large in the Library, searching for the gem that will free him completely. Asmodeus incapacitates Eve and the Librarians, but the real Jenkins returns in time to save Jeff, who gave the gem to his mother. They then trail the demon back to Jeff's house and defeat him together. After regaining his true body, Jenkins continues his relationship with his new friends, becoming Dungeon Master of Jeff's D&D group.
41	11	"And the Trial of the One"	Marc Roskin	Tom MacRae	January 31, 2018	1.34
Loud chiming bells signal that the tethering must happen right away, but the Librarians cannot choose which one should participate. To help make the decision, Stone reads a spell found by Cassandra, The Ritual of the One. All are taken to the Trial grounds where the Library, in possession of Jenkins, decrees a battle to the death leaving one Librarian, with Jenkins' life forfeit if the Librarians refuse. Cassandra, Stone, and Ezekiel are briefly transported to their worst nightmares where friends are recast as enemies, emerging with no memory of each other. A violent race to the finish ensues, each Librarian convinced the only way to save Jenkins is to kill the others, until Baird intervenes and convinces them not to murder one another. Jenkins is freed, but the Library still kills him. Enraged, Cassandra, Stone, and Ezekiel all resign, leaving the Librarianship vacant. A despairing Baird is visited by Nicole Noone, who explains that everything that has happened since the discovery of the map of the cornerstones months ago was part of her plan. Now that it has been abandoned and untethered, the Library fades out of reality, leaving Baird alone in a washed out alternate world where imagination, wonder, and the search for knowledge are outlawed.
42	12	"And the Echoes of Memory"	Dean Devlin	Kate Rorick	February 7, 2018	1.44
Eve and the Librarians struggle to hold onto their memories in the alternate world, chased by a bitter and angry Nicole. With help from drawings made by Flynn, an insane asylum patient in this reality, their faith in the Library is restored. The Library itself returns, as does everyone's memories, but Jenkins remains dead. Flynn chooses to use an artifact to travel back in time to when Nicole first became immortal in order to right his wrong of never going back for her. Flynn tells Nicole that she must remain in the past, but asks her to have her adventures for the Library instead of against it, something that she accepts. When Flynn returns to the present, he wakes up at the point where the season began and realizes time has been altered as a result of Nicole letting go of her bitterness. None of the evil Nicole caused has occurred, and Jenkins is alive and immortal again. Flynn and Baird, the only ones who remember the world where Nicole was evil, undergo the tethering ceremony as Librarian and Guardian.
