= The Glades (TV series) =

American crime drama television series

- Also known as: Sugarloaf
- Genre: Crime drama; Comedy drama; Police procedural
- Created by: Clifton Campbell
- Starring: Matt Passmore; Kiele Sanchez; Carlos Gómez; Uriah Shelton; Jordan Wall; Michelle Hurd
- Composer: Danny Lux
- Country of origin: United States
- Original language: English
- No. of seasons: 4
- No. of episodes: 49 (list of episodes)

Production
- Executive producers: Clifton Campbell; Lori-Etta Taub; Lois Johnson; Gary A. Randall
- Producers: Ed Tapia; Dailyn Rodriguez
- Production location: South Florida
- Editors: John Axness; Tammis Chandler; Raúl Dávalos; William B. Stich; Miriam Kim
- Running time: 45 minutes
- Production companies: Innuendo Productions; Grand Productions; Fox Television Studios

Original release
- Network: A&E
- Release: July 11, 2010 – August 26, 2013

The Glades is an American crime drama television series, created by Clifton Campbell, that aired on the A&E network for four seasons from July 11, 2010, to August 26, 2013.

The police procedural show starred Matt Passmore as Jim Longworth, a Chicago police detective who becomes a state police detective in a Florida Everglades community. A&E canceled the series after four seasons with a cliffhanger of Longworth being shot minutes before his wedding.

== Plot ==
The show's premise involves a Chicago detective taking a South Florida job with the Florida Department of Law Enforcement (FDLE) after being shot in the buttocks by his captain, who thought Jim was sleeping with his wife. He receives a large settlement from the city of Chicago and settles in Florida for the golf and what he believes will be an easy life. Longworth soon discovers that his new hometown is more complex than meets the eye.

== Cast ==
- Matt Passmore as Jim Longworth, a homicide detective from Chicago who leaves the city after being shot in the buttocks by his captain, who had wrongfully accused Longworth of having sex with his wife. Using the payout he received from the Chicago PD, Longworth searches for the simple life and moves to the (fictional) resort town of Palm Glade, Florida, joining the local bureau of the FDLE, hoping that the area will help him relax. Longworth is surprised at the high murder rate in southwest Florida, making his job there perhaps more stressful than it was in Chicago. His cockiness, annoying self-confidence, dry wit, and self-serving humor rub almost everyone around him the wrong way. Nonetheless, he is very intelligent and solves murders, making him a valuable addition to the FDLE. He has strong feelings for Callie but does not wish to break up her family.
- Kiele Sanchez as Callie Cargill, a 30-something mother who leads a very complicated life. She is a registered nurse simultaneously working and attending medical school and is completely devoted to her studying and to her teenage son, Jeff, whom she has been raising alone since her husband Ray was sent to prison. She is amused and annoyed by Longworth's pursuit of her, but is also intrigued by him and perhaps interested in a relationship, despite her general dislike of cops. She has mentioned having the desire to leave Ray but does not want to be "that woman" who gives her husband divorce papers while he is in jail.
- Carlos Gómez as Dr. Carlos Sanchez, Longworth's friend and colleague, a forensic pathologist who works the crime lab, supervising toxicology screens and autopsies. Longworth's persistence and intuition when it comes to crime-solving skills usually bother him, especially since he often is forced into compromising positions to try to prove one of his partner's theories. He is also a devoted husband and father.
- Jordan Wall as Daniel Green, a nerdy 20-something graduate student at Tampa Tech who gets an internship working for Carlos in the medical examiner's office. His expertise in all things science-related comes in handy in surprising ways for Longworth, as he helps him crack cases. Daniel is overzealous in helping Longworth on cases, especially if it means he gets to be involved with other police work that he finds cool and interesting.
- Michelle Hurd as Colleen Manus, the smart and tough regional director for the FDLE. She reluctantly hired Jim Longworth, and like Carlos, is frequently annoyed by his antics. Because of Longworth's track record and rate of closure, she gives him slack, but she has no problem yanking him back if he gets out of line—which is pretty much an everyday occurrence.
- Uriah Shelton as Jeff Cargill, Callie's smart, teenage son who struggles to reconcile his parents' odd and up-for-grabs marital status. With his father in prison, Jeff constantly tests his boundaries with his mother. He takes a quick liking to Longworth. In season two, his father is out of jail and Jeff spends time with him. Not knowing of his mom's desire for a divorce, he wants his family to be together again.

== Production ==
=== Development ===
Originally titled Sugarloaf, the series was set to take place in the Tampa Bay metro area. It was filmed in a former carpet warehouse in Pembroke Park, Florida, and in the Hollywood and Ft. Lauderdale, Florida, metro area, making it one of the three series at the time, along with Burn Notice and Retired at 35, to be filmed exclusively in the state.

Matt Passmore was the first actor cast in the series. Kiele Sanchez, Uriah Shelton, and Carlos Gómez were cast next. On February 25, 2010, The Glades was given a series order of 13 episodes.

On September 13, 2010, A&E announced that the show had been renewed for a second season. Season two of the series premiered on Sunday, June 5, 2011. On October 18, 2011, The Glades was renewed for a third season, which premiered June 3, 2012. With a 5% increase in viewership, A&E renewed The Glades for a fourth season.

On September 1, 2013, The Huffington Post reported that the A&E Network did not renew The Glades for its fifth season. Show creator Clifton Campbell later told Rob Owen that the fifth season would have focused on the question "Who shot Jim Longworth?", adding that Longworth would have survived. Campbell said, "The cancellation took us all by surprise."

== Episodes ==
In total, 49 episodes of The Glades were aired over four seasons.

Season	Episodes	Originally released	
Season	Episodes	First released	Last released
1	13	July 11, 2010	October 3, 2010
2	13	June 5, 2011	September 5, 2011
3	10	June 3, 2012	August 12, 2012
4	13	May 27, 2013	August 26, 2013

== Reception ==
The Glades debuted with 3.6 million viewers, breaking A&E's records for most-watched and highest-rated original drama series telecast ever according to Nielsen Fast Nationals numbers. The show has been met with positive reviews, with an initial score of 64 out of 100 from Metacritic.

=== Ratings ===
Season	Timeslot (ET/PT)	# Ep.	Premiered		Ended		TV Season	Viewers (in millions)
Season	Timeslot (ET/PT)	# Ep.	Date	Premiere Viewers (in millions)	Date	Finale Viewers (in millions)	TV Season	Viewers (in millions)
Season 1	Sunday 10 pm	13	July 11, 2010	3.55	October 3, 2010	2.69	2010	3.8
Season 2	Sunday 10 pm	13	June 5, 2011	3.01	September 5, 2011	2.38	2011	3.9
Season 3	Sunday 9 pm	10	June 3, 2012	3.11	August 12, 2012	3.10	2012	3.0
Season 4	Monday 9 pm	13	May 27, 2013	3.26	August 26, 2013	3.41	2013	3.4

== Home media ==
The Glades: Season One was released on DVD in region 1 on June 14, 2011, and region 4 on March 7, 2012. It contains all 13 episodes of season one. Special features include deleted scenes, a gag reel, behind-the-scenes footage, "Sunshine State of Mind: Casting The Glades" and "A Location for Murder: Filming in the Glades" featurettes, and cast commentaries.

The Glades: Season Two was released on DVD in region 1 on July 10, 2012, and is set to be released in region 4 on December 31, 2013. It contains all 13 episodes of season two. Special features include deleted scenes, commentary, "Jim Longworth's Guide to Police Work" and "Love Triangles: Relationship Complexities and The Glades" featurettes, and a gag reel.

The Glades: Season Three was released on DVD in region 1 on June 4, 2013. The Glades: Season Four was released on DVD in region 1 on June 3, 2014.

== Broadcast ==
In Australia, the series premiered on SoHo (formerly W) on December 5, 2010, with season two returning on December 4, 2011, season 3 on August 20, 2012, and season 4 on May 30, 2013.

In the UK, the series premiered on Alibi on September 11, 2012, with season two returning on January 22, 2013, and season three on September 4, 2013. The fourth season, its last, premiered on July 15, 2014.

The series, except for season four's episode seven "Gypsies, Tramps and Thieves", is available to watch in the UK on Disney+.
