= Lucas Bryant =

Canadian-American actor

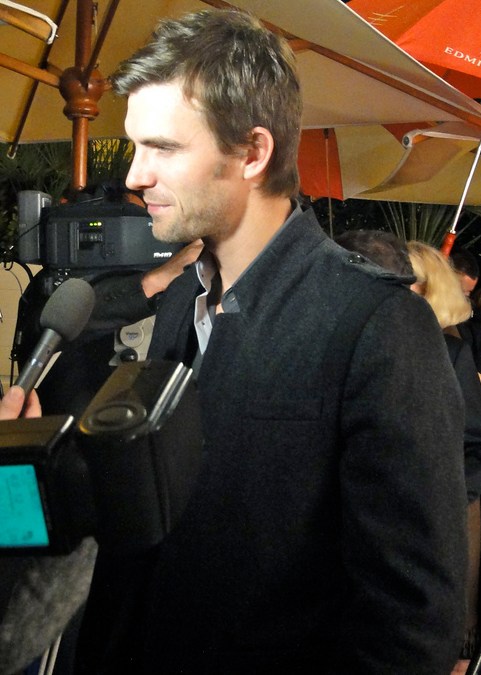
- Bryant at MIPCOM in Cannes, France, October 4, 2010
- Born: September 28, 1978 (age 47); Elmira, Ontario, Canada
- Occupation: Actor
- Years active: 2002–present
- Known for: Nathan Wuornos in Haven
- Spouse: Kirsty Hinchcliffe
- Children: 2

Lucas Bryant (born September 28, 1978) is a Canadian-American actor, best known for his role as Nathan Wuornos in the Syfy TV channel series Haven (2010–2015).

== Early life ==
Bryant was born in Elmira, Ontario, Canada to Susan Hodges Bryant and M. Darrol Bryant; he has dual Canadian and U.S. citizenship. His father's from North Dakota and of "Scandinavian/Finnish heritage". His mother was also born and raised in the United States. Bryant graduated from Elmira District Secondary School and studied acting at Sheridan College in Oakville, Ontario.

== Acting career ==
He was the star of the short-lived UPN television series Sex, Love & Secrets. For television, Bryant has appeared in the movie More Sex and the Single Mom, as well as guest starred in the series Queer as Folk, Odyssey 5 and Playmakers. He has also starred in Canadian television projects, including Crazy Canucks, An American in Canada and The Eleventh Hour. Bryant has appeared on stage all over Canada in many productions, including The Crucible and The King and I. Bryant appeared as Gabe McCall on the CBC drama MVP: The Secret Lives of Hockey Wives.

In 2006, Bryant starred as Calvin Puddie in the TV movie Playing House based on the book by Patricia Pearson. He also starred as Brad in the short musical I Hate Musicals. Bryant had supporting roles in the movies A Very Merry Daughter of the Bride and The Vow. In 2010, he and Haven co-star Emily Rose previously starred together in the 2010 "made-for-TV" suspense-thriller Perfect Plan.

In 2010, Bryant landed a lead role as Nathan in Haven, a TV series based on Stephen King's novel "The Colorado Kid". In "Haven," Bryant plays 'Nathan Wuornos,' the wry, hardened local cop who somewhat reluctantly becomes the partner of new-to-town FBI agent 'Audrey Parker,' played by Emily Rose. BuddyTV ranked him #72 on its list of "TV's Sexiest Men of 2011".

In late 2012, Bryant starred in the Lifetime original movie Merry In-Laws. Bryant played Peter, a teacher who becomes engaged to an astronomer. When she meets his parents she learns that they are really Mr. and Mrs. Santa Claus. The film co-stars former Cheers stars George Wendt and Shelley Long as Mr. and Mrs. Claus. The film is directed by Leslie Hope who previously directed Bryant in A Very Merry Daughter of the Bride. In 2013, he guest-starred in shows CSI: Crime Scene Investigation, Cracked and Beauty & the Beast.

In 2015, Bryant played the role of Count Johan Oxenstierna in the historical drama The Girl King. In 2016, he and his Haven co-star Emily Rose had supporting role in the movie Secret Summer, which premiered on PixL. In summer 2016, he starred as Tom Novak in the Hallmark Original Movie Tulips in Spring co-starring Fiona Gubelmann. He also starred as Colin Fitzgerlad in another Hallmark movie Summer Love co-starring Rachael Leigh Cook. In fall, he starred in the highly anticipated CBC series from Jennifer Holness and Sudz Sutherland, Shoot the Messenger.

== Personal life ==
Bryant is married to Australian-born actress and personal trainer Kirsty Hinchcliffe. They have a daughter born in August 2008 and, as of July 2010, live in Santa Monica, California. They also have a son, born in 2015.

== Filmography ==
=== Film ===
Year	Title	Role	Notes
2006	Sunday Morning	Karey Brant	
2007	Hate Musicals	Brad	Short film
2012	The Vow	Kyle	Supporting role
2015	The Girl King	Count Johan Oxenstierna	
2018	Walk to Vegas	Chucky	

=== Television ===
Year	Title	Role	Notes
2002	Queer as Folk	Student	1 episode: "...Wherever That Dream May Lead You"
2003	Playmakers		1 episode: "Man in Motion"
2003	An American in Canada		
2004	Crazy Canucks	Ken Read	Television film
2004	The Eleventh Hour		1 episode: "Stormy Petrel"
2004	Odyssey 5	Young Chuck Taggert	1 episode: "Begotten"
2005	More Sex & the Single Mom	Gabe Emerson	Television film (Lifetime)
2005	Queer as Folk	Tucker	2 episodes: "Anything in Common" and "I Love You"
2005	Sex, Love & Secrets	Milo Vanderbeer	Main role (7 episodes)
2006	Playing House	Calvin Puddie	Television film (CTV)
2008	MVP	Gabe McCall	Series regular
2008	Faux Baby	Harry	Web series; series regular (5 episodes)
2008	A Very Merry Daughter of the Bride	Dylan	Television film (Lifetime)
2009	Dollhouse	Travis Leeds	1 episode: "Echo"; deleted scene, uncredited
2010–2015	Haven	Nathan Wuornos	Main role
2011	Perfect Plan	Sean / Keenan Blake	Television film
2012	Merry In-Laws	Peter	Television film (Lifetime)
2013	CSI: Crime Scene Investigation	Shaun McHenry	1 episode: "Dead of the Class"
2013	Cracked	Jesse Powell	1 episode: "Old Soldiers"
2013	Beauty & the Beast	Paul Davis	2 episodes: "Heart of Darkness" and "Playing with Fire"
2016	Shoot the Messenger	Simon Olenski	
2016	Secret Summer	Daniel	Hallmark Channel
2016	Tulips in Spring	Tom Novak	Television film (Hallmark)
2016	Summer Love	Colin Fitzgerald	Television film (Hallmark)
2018	Frankie Drake Mysteries	Phillip Anderson	1 episode
2019	Time for You to Come Home for Christmas	Jack	Television Film (Hallmark)
2019	Agents of S.H.I.E.L.D.	Keller	3 episodes
2020	Country At Heart	Duke	Television Film (Hallmark)
2020	The Angel Tree	Matthew Anderson	Television Film (Hallmark)
2022	Five More Minutes: Moments Like These	Matthew Jamison	Television Film (Hallmark)
2023	A World Record Christmas	Eric Parsons	Television Film (Hallmark)
2024	The Real West	Jake West	Television Film (Hallmark)
2024	Murder in a small town	Roger Galbraith	Television series
