= List of killings by law enforcement officers in the United States, July 2021 =

This is a list of people reported killed by non-military law enforcement officers in the United States in July 2021, whether in the line of duty or not, and regardless of reason or method. The listing documents the occurrence of a death, making no implications regarding wrongdoing or justification on the part of the person killed or officer involved. Killings are arranged by date of the incident that caused death. Different death dates, if known, are noted in the description. The table below lists 83 people.

== July 2021 ==
Date	Name (age) of deceased	Race	Location	Description
2021-07-31	Name Withheld (39)	Unknown race	Yulee, Florida	
2021-07-31	Ruben Isaac Sanchez (31)	Hispanic	Woodville, California	
2021-07-31	Keith Wayne Homrighausen (49)	White	Centennial, Colorado	
2021-07-30	Luis Fernando Flores (44)	Hispanic	Celina, Texas	
2021-07-29	James Haynes (31)	Black	Mansfield, Ohio	
2021-07-28	Jonathan Andrew Pears (32)	White	Wetumpka, Alabama	
2021-07-27	Robert P. Uhler (56)	White	Westfield, Pennsylvania	
2021-07-27	Losardo Lucas (55)	Black	Calumet City, Illinois	
2021-07-27	Michael D. Whitmer (37)	White	Nelsonville, Ohio	
2021-07-27	Justin Damon Roberts (35)	Unknown race	Cottonwood, Alabama	
2021-07-27	Douglas Joseph Claiborne (60)	White	Las Vegas, Nevada	
2021-07-27	Lisa Hight	White	Chickasha, Oklahoma	
2021-07-27	Alexis C. Wilson (19)	Black	Dolton, Illinois	Irate that a restaurant had closed for the evening, Wilson pulled a gun at the drive-thru window. Police arrived and instructed Wilson to exit her vehicle, but she refused, and drove away with an officer—who was attempting to remove Wilson from the vehicle—hanging from her car window. Wilson was shot dead by a second officer before running him over.
2021-07-26	Samuel Soto (53)	Unknown	Los Angeles, California	Police responded to an off-duty officer who reported a man cutting himself with a knife. After Soto refused to drop the knife, police fired three times, striking him once. After an officer kicked the knife away, Soto got up and ran towards an officer. One of the officers tried to tell the others that Soto had dropped the knife, but they weren't able to hear him due to a nearby police helicopter. An officer then shot Soto, who was holding a cellphone. Soto died from his injuries five months later.
2021-07-26	Neida Tijerina (29)	Hispanic	San Antonio, Texas	
2021-07-26	Hermenegildo Gonzalez Jr. (58)	Hispanic	Los Angeles, California	
2021-07-26	Jacob Bender (39)	White	Gobles, Michigan	
2021-07-26	Damien Montrell Cameron (29)	Black	Braxton, Mississippi	
2021-07-25	Name Withheld (35)	Unknown race	Crowley, Louisiana	
2021-07-25	Gabriel "Sam" Parker (38)	Black	Atlanta, Georgia	
2021-07-25	Jose Manuel Ramirez Jr. (41)	Hispanic	Wasco, California	
2021-07-24	Cody Brannan (27)	Unknown race	Dothan, Alabama	
2021-07-24	Forrest T. Moore (31)	White	Boise, Idaho	
2021-07-23	Jesus Salvado Valeta (22)	Hispanic	San Diego, California	
2021-07-22	Cullen Condon (25)	White	Boerne, Texas	
2021-07-22	Carlos Rodriguez (40)	Hispanic	Philadelphia, Pennsylvania	
2021-07-22	Shawn Tillison (43)	White	Duncan, Oklahoma	
2021-07-21	Michael Whitmer (37)	White	Nelsonville, Ohio	Responding to a domestic dispute, a Hocking College officer opened fire as Whitmer attempted to drive away, killing him and wounding a Nelsonville Police officer. The officer was charged with negligent homicide and later pled no contest.
2021-07-20	Miguel F. Hernandez-Rodriguez (31)	Hispanic	Phoenix, Arizona	
2021-07-20	Nevada "Japoy" Lee Escholt (42)	Native Hawaiian and Pacific Islander	Salt Lake City, Utah	
2021-07-20	Gerardo Martinez (19)	Native American	Salinas, California	
2021-07-20	Gilberto Martinez-Nava (37)	Hispanic	Davenport, Florida	
2021-07-20	Mitchell Shuller (35)	White	Harrisburg, Pennsylvania	
2021-07-19	Jason Fralick (43)	White	Cairo, Georgia	
2021-07-19	Michael Clifton (50)	White	Toledo, Ohio	
2021-07-18	Leslie Stephen Scarlett (35)	Black	Tucson, Arizona	
2021-07-18	Clint Dearman (35)	White	Daphne, Alabama	
2021-07-18	Irvin Peterson (35)	Black	Houston, Texas	
2021-07-17	Jeffrey Scott (30)	Unknown race	Las Vegas, New Mexico	
2021-07-17	Name Withheld (16)	Unknown race	Appalachia, Virginia	
2021-07-17	Quentin Bogard	Black	Canton, Mississippi	Wanted by police for allegedly shooting a woman the previous night, Bogard barricaded himself inside a motel room where—after a three-hour standoff—he was shot dead after firing at police.
2021-07-17	Maurice Sentel Mincey (36)	Black	Savannah, Georgia	Police stopped a car for a traffic violation, and when they observed Mincey moving around the passenger seat they instructed him to show his hands. According to bodycam video, Mincey was shot dead when he exited the vehicle pointing a gun at police.
2021-07-16	Gerardo Martinez (19)	Native American	Salinas, California	Police shot Martinez after he allegedly raised what appeared to be a gun at police. According to neighbors, police gave commands in Spanish, but Martinez spoke Zapotec. The object Martinez was holding was later revealed to be a BB gun.
2021-07-16	Ryan LeRoux (21)	Black	Gaithersburg, Maryland	
2021-07-16	Craig Heinzen (64)	White	Roswell, New Mexico	
2021-07-16	Dawn Simpson (51)	White	Nampa, Idaho	
2021-07-15	Xavier Vern Hutt (24)	White	Essex, Montana	
2021-07-15	Matthew James Sova (48)	White	Los Angeles, California	Police shot a man on the Hollywood Walk of Fame after reports of a man with a gun. Police alleged a replica handgun was recovered from the scene, but photos of the object appear to show a novelty lighter.
2021-07-14	Hershel Weinberger (9)	White	Chicago, Illinois	An off-duty officer driving accidentally struck and killed Weinberger as he was crossing the street on his bicycle. The officer's breathalyzer test came back negative for alcohol.
2021-07-14	David Salinas (32)	Hispanic	Houston, Texas	
2021-07-14	Marquez Floyd (31)	Black	Albuquerque, New Mexico	
2021-07-13	Jesse Joe Carranza (21)	Hispanic	El Paso, Texas	
2021-07-13	Justin Powell (32)	Black	Baltimore, Maryland	
2021-07-12	Name Withheld	Unknown race	Ontario, California	
2021-07-12	Johnny Ray Kirk (22)	White	Pensacola, Florida	
2021-07-11	Jonathan Balchunas (24)	White	North East, Maryland	
2021-07-11	Shawn Thomas (36)	Native American	Waterflow, New Mexico	
2021-07-10	Randy Lee Jenkins (37)	White	Bennington Township, Michigan	
2021-07-10	James Holland Sr (37)	Black	Avondale, Arizona	
2021-07-09	Klevontaye White (34)	Black	Chicago, Illinois	
2021-07-09	Arcadio Castillo III (23)	Hispanic	Salem, Oregon	
2021-07-09	Mahlon Taylor (59)	White	Doyline, Louisiana	
2021-07-08	Name Withheld (53)	Unknown race	Brooklyn, New York	
2021-07-08	Stanley Howard (64)	White	Phoenix, Arizona	
2021-07-08	Shannon M. Wilcox (53)	Unknown race	Presque Isle, Maine	
2021-07-07	Edward Daniel Santana (45)	Hispanic	Santa Fe, New Mexico	
2021-07-07	Jerry Allan Gunter (34)	White	Medford, Oregon	
2021-07-06	Shelby Ray Hardin (33)	White	Danville, Kentucky	
2021-07-06	Joseph D. McGrath (52)	White	Carterville, Illinois	
2021-07-06	Steven Adam Calderon (32)	White	Paso Robles, California	
2021-07-06	Jose Benitez-Vasquez (32)	Hispanic	Houston, Texas	
2021-07-06	Leneal Frazier (40)	Black	Minneapolis, Minnesota	Leneal Frazier, an uninvolved bystander, was killed on July 6, 2021, by a Minneapolis police squad car that was pursuing a robbery suspect in a vehicle that was reportedly carjacked earlier. While in pursuit, the squad car struck several vehicles, including Frazier's vehicle, near the intersection of Lyndale Avenue and 41st Avenue North at approximately 12:30 a.m. CDT. Frazier was a relative of Darnella Frazier, the then-teenager who filmed the murder of George Floyd her cellphone on May 25, 2020.
2021-07-06	Dasan "DJ" Jones (15)	Black	Baltimore, Maryland	Baltimore Police Officer Eric Banks killed Jones, his stepson, before stuffing his body into an attic crawlspace. When police responded, he became combative and tried to take one officer's gun. Banks was convicted of murder and attempting to disarm a police officer and sentenced to 42 years in prison.
2021-07-05	Eduardo Mendez Amezquita (28)	Hispanic	San Antonio, Texas	
2021-07-04	Ricardo Torres, Jr. (32)	Latino	Olivia, Minnesota	Ricardo Torres, Jr., a 32-year old man who resided in Olivia, Minnesota, was fatally shot by Olivia police officer Arron Clouse at 2:20 a.m. on July 4, 2021, during a confrontation. Torres allegedly brandished a shotgun and failed to comply with Clouse's order. Authorities recovered a shotgun at the scene.
2021-07-04	John Reuben Turbe (30)	Black	Tampa, Florida	
2021-07-04	Craig Locklear (49)	White	Salemburg, North Carolina	
2021-07-04	Gulia Dale III (61)	Black	Newton, New Jersey	
2021-07-04	Matthew J. Morse (36)	White	Ravenna Township, Ohio	
2021-07-02	Thomas Charlie Billings (37)	White	Traphill, North Carolina	
2021-07-01	Shannon Earl Smith (45)	Black	Spartanburg, South Carolina	
2021-07-01	Jesus Rodriguez (23)	Hispanic	Douglasville, Georgia	
2021-07-01	Lisa A. Short (54)	White	Kingsport, Tennessee	

== See also ==
- Death in custody § United States
- Henry A. Wallace Police Crime Public Database
- List of cases of police brutality
- List of countries with annual rates and counts for killings by law enforcement officers
- List of law enforcement officers killed in the line of duty in the United States
- List of law enforcement officers convicted for an on-duty killing in the United States
- List of shootings by US immigration agents
- List of police reforms related to the George Floyd protests
- List of unarmed African Americans killed by law enforcement officers in the United States
- Lists of killings by law enforcement officers
- Police brutality in the United States
- Police misconduct § United States
- Police riot § United States
- Police use of deadly force in the United States
