= Subjects of Desire (film) =

2021 Canadian documentary film

- Directed by: Jennifer Holness
- Written by: Jennifer Holness
- Produced by: Jennifer Holness; Sudz Sutherland
- Cinematography: Ricardo Diaz; Iris Ng
- Edited by: Lawrence Jackman
- Music by: Teddi Jones
- Production companies: Hungry Eyes Film and Television
- Distributed by: IndieCan Entertainment
- Release date: March 17, 2021 (SXSW)
- Running time: 103 minutes
- Country: Canada
- Language: English

Subjects of Desire is a Canadian documentary film, directed by Jennifer Holness and released in 2021. Nominally jumping off from the 50th anniversary of the Miss Black America pageant in 2018, the film is an exploration of the relationship between African-American and Black Canadian society with the broader cultural concept of beauty standards.

Figures appearing in the film include India Arie, Jully Black, Rachel Dolezal, Alexandra Germain, Brittany Lee Lewis, Seraiah Nicole, Ryann Richardson, Cheryl Thompson, Carolyn West and Heather Widdows.

The film premiered on the online platform of the SXSW festival on March 12, 2021, and had its Canadian premiere at the Hot Docs Canadian International Documentary Festival in April.

The film was nominated for the Directors Guild of Canada's DGC Discovery Award in 2021, and was named to the Toronto International Film Festival's annual year-end Canada's Top Ten list.
