= Killing of Philando Castile =

2016 police killing in Falcon Heights, Minnesota

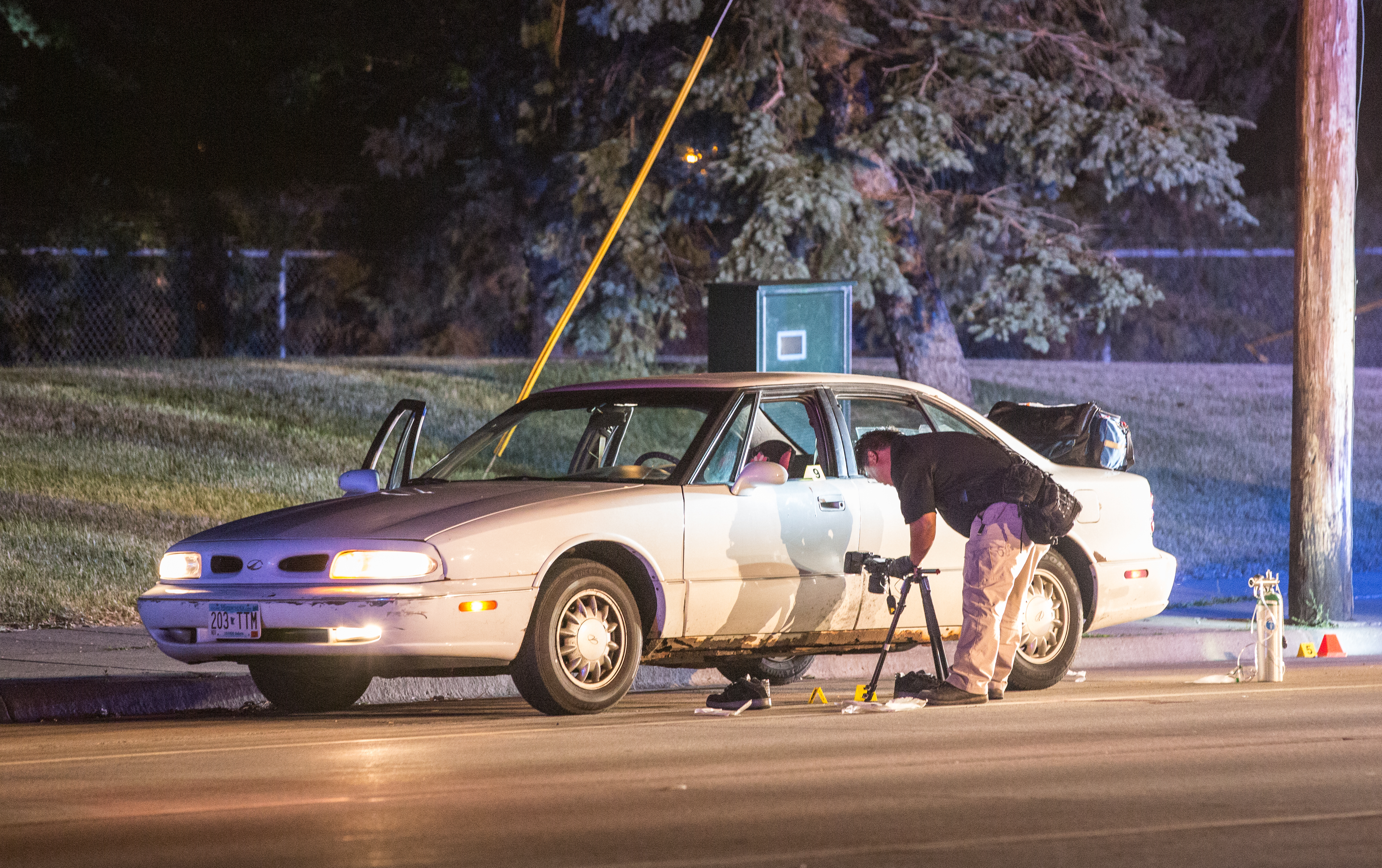
- Minnesota Bureau of Criminal Apprehension investigators process the scene
- Date: July 6, 2016; 10 years ago
- Time: c. 9:37 p.m. (CDT; UTC-05:00)
- Location: Larpenteur Avenue and Fry Street, Falcon Heights, Minnesota, U.S.; 44°59′30″N 93°10′17″W
- Type: Shooting by law enforcement
- Filmed by: Diamond Reynolds
- Outcome: Yanez fired in 2017
- Deaths: Philando Castile
- Arrests: Jeronimo Yanez
- Charges: Second-degree manslaughter Two counts of dangerous discharge of a firearm
- Verdict: Not guilty
- Litigation: Wrongful death lawsuit by Castile family settled for $2.995 million Lawsuit by Castile's girlfriend settled for $800,000

On July 6, 2016, Philando Castile, (Note: Pronounced /fɪˈlɑːndoʊ kæˈstiːl/ fih-LAHN-doh ka-STEEL.) a 32-year-old African American man, was fatally shot during a traffic stop by police officer Jeronimo Yanez of the St. Anthony police department in the Minneapolis–Saint Paul metropolitan area.

About 9 p.m., Castile was driving with his girlfriend, Diamond Reynolds, and her four-year-old daughter when he was pulled over by Yanez and another officer in Falcon Heights, a suburb of Saint Paul, Minnesota. Castile, who was licensed to carry a firearm, told Yanez that he had a firearm. Yanez replied, "Don't reach for it then". Castile responded, "I'm, I, I was reaching for...", to which Yanez replied, "Don't pull it out". Castile replied, "I'm not pulling it out", and Reynolds said, "He's not..." Yanez again said, "Don't pull it out". The police officer then fired seven close-range shots at Castile, hitting him five times. Castile died of his wounds at 9:37 p.m. at Hennepin County Medical Center, about 20 minutes after being shot.

Immediately after the shooting, Reynolds posted a live stream video on Facebook from the car. The incident quickly drew international interest. Local and national protests formed, and five months after the incident, Yanez was charged with second-degree manslaughter and two counts of dangerous discharge of a firearm. After five days of deliberation, he was acquitted of all charges in a jury trial on June 16, 2017. After the verdict, Yanez was immediately fired by the City of Saint Anthony. Wrongful death lawsuits against the City brought by Reynolds and Castile's family were settled for a total of $3.8 million.

== Persons involved ==
=== Philando Castile ===
Philando Divall Castile (July 16, 1983 – July 6, 2016) was born in St. Louis, Missouri, lived in Robbinsdale, Minnesota, with his family, and graduated from Saint Paul Central High School in 2001. He had worked for the Saint Paul Public School District since 2002. Castile began as a nutrition services assistant at Chelsea Heights Elementary School and Arlington High School (now Washington Technology Magnet School). He was promoted to nutrition services supervisor at J. J. Hill Montessori Magnet School in August 2014.

Before the shooting, Castile had been stopped by the police at least 49 times in 13 years for minor traffic and equipment violations, most of which were dismissed. (Note: After a 2011 traffic stop when Castile was arrested for driving with a revoked license, he had in fact been transported to jail by Officer Yanez, although it is unclear whether the two men recognized each other at the time of the fatal shooting.)

=== Jeronimo Yanez ===
Jeronimo Yanez was the officer who shot and killed Castile. The other officer involved in the traffic stop was Joseph Kauser, who was described as Yanez's partner. Both officers had been with the St. Anthony Police Department for four years at the time of the shooting, and were longtime friends who had graduated together from the Minnesota State University, Mankato, police academy in 2010.

Yanez, of South St. Paul and of Hispanic descent, was 28 years old at the time of the shooting.

The St. Anthony Police Department had 23 officers at the time. Eight officers were funded through policing contracts with the cities of Lauderdale and Falcon Heights. In a press briefing at the scene, St. Anthony's interim police chief Jon Mangseth said that the shooting was the first officer-involved shooting that the department had experienced in at least thirty years.

== Incident ==
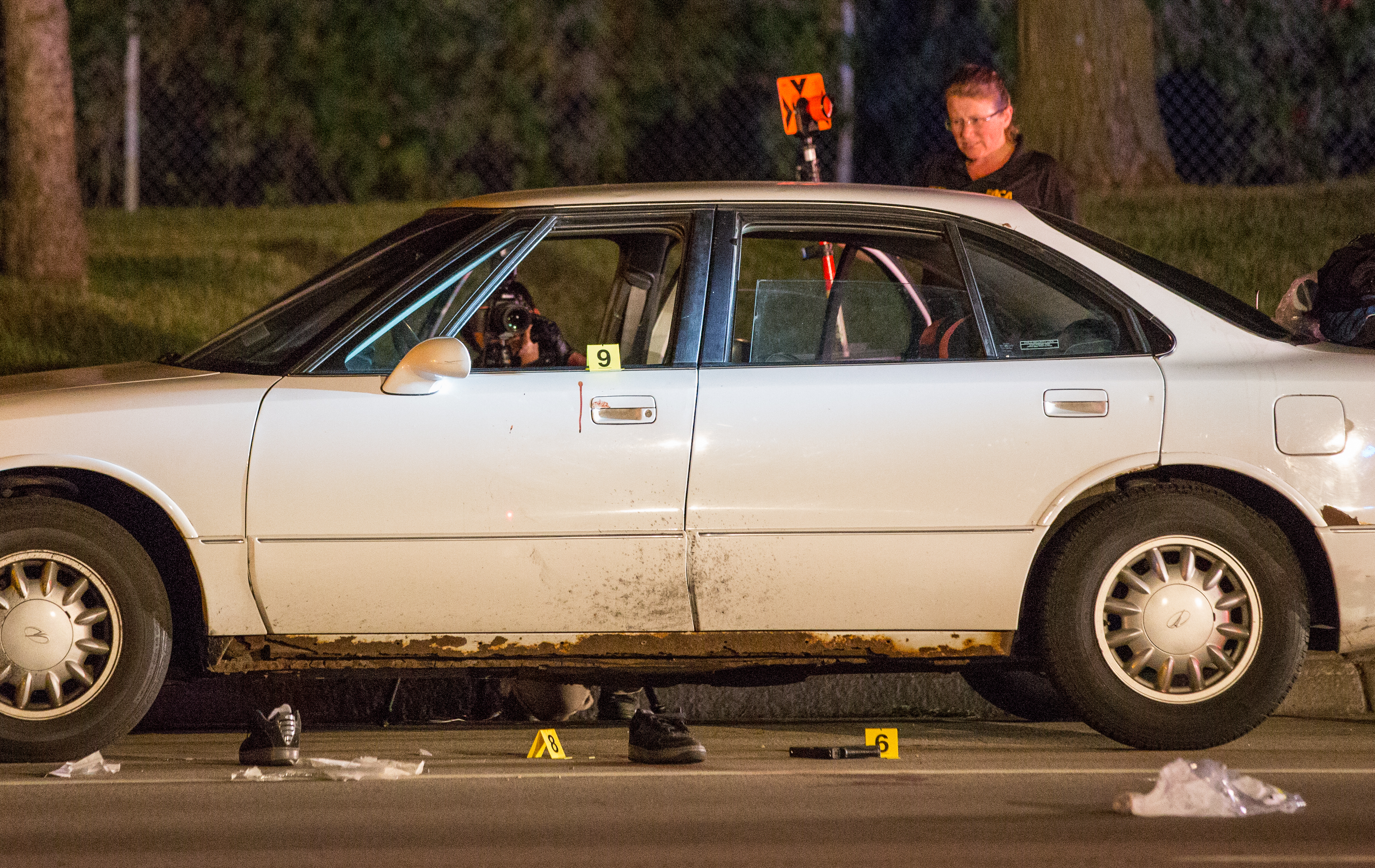
Shoes and Philando Castile's firearm on the ground outside the vehicle as Minnesota Bureau of Criminal Apprehension (BCA) investigators take photographs of the scene

External videos
- Diamond Reynolds' Facebook Live video immediately after the shooting (10:29), Heavy.com
- Philando Castile, Diamond Reynolds and a Nightmare Caught on Video (composite of several videos, 4:49), The New York Times

Castile was pulled over as part of a traffic stop for a broken brake light by Yanez and Kauser in Falcon Heights, Minnesota, a suburb of Saint Paul. Castile and Reynolds were returning from shopping at a grocery store; earlier that evening, Castile had gone for a haircut, eaten dinner with his sister, and picked up his girlfriend from his apartment in St. Paul.

A St. Anthony police officer patrolling Larpenteur Avenue radioed to a nearby squad that he planned to pull over the car and check the IDs of the driver and passenger, saying, "The two occupants just look like people that were involved in a robbery. The driver looks more like one of our suspects, just because of the wide-set nose. I couldn't get a good look at the passenger." At 9:04 p.m. CDT, the officer told a nearby officer that he would wait for him to make the stop.

The stop took place on Larpenteur Avenue at Fry Street, just outside the Minnesota state fairgrounds, at about 9:05 p.m. CDT. Riding in a white 1997 Oldsmobile Eighty Eight LS with Castile were his girlfriend Diamond Reynolds and her four-year-old daughter. Castile was the driver, Reynolds was the front-seat passenger, and the child was in the back seat. "According to investigators, Yanez approached the car from the driver's side, while Kauser approached it from the passenger side."

The police dashcam video shows that 40 seconds elapsed between when Yanez first started talking to Castile through the car window and when Yanez began shooting at him. According to the dashcam, after Yanez asked for Castile's driver's license and proof of insurance, Castile gave him his proof of insurance card, which Yanez appeared to glance at and tuck in his outer pocket. Castile then calmly informed Yanez, "Sir, I have to tell you that I do have a firearm on me." Quoting The Minnesota Star Tribune description of the next 13 seconds of the video:

Before Castile completed the sentence, Yanez interrupted and calmly replied, "OK," and placed his right hand on the holster of his own holstered weapon. Yanez said, "Okay, don't reach for it, then ... don't pull it out." Castile responded, "I'm not pulling it out," and Reynolds also said, "He's not pulling it out." Yanez repeated, raising his voice, "Don't pull it out!" as he quickly pulled his own gun with his right hand and reached inside the driver's window with his left hand. Reynolds screamed, "No!" Yanez removed his left arm from the car and fired seven shots in the direction of Castile in rapid succession. Reynolds yelled, "You just killed my boyfriend!" Castile moaned and said, "I wasn't reaching for it." Reynolds loudly said, "He wasn't reaching for it." Before she completed her sentence, Yanez again screamed, "Don't pull it out!" Reynolds responded, "He wasn't." Yanez yelled, "Don't move! Fuck!"

Of the seven shots fired by Yanez at point blank range, five hit Castile and two of those pierced his heart. Events immediately after the shooting were streamed live in a 10-minute video by Reynolds via Facebook. The recording appears to begin seconds after Castile was shot, just after 9:00 p.m. CDT. The video depicts Castile slumped over, moaning and moving slightly, with a bloodied left arm and side. In the video, Reynolds is speaking with Yanez and explaining what happened. Reynolds stated on the video that Yanez "asked him for license and registration. He told him that it was in his wallet, but he had a pistol on him because he's licensed to carry." Castile did have a license to carry a gun. Reynolds further narrated that the officer said "Don't move", and as Castile was putting his hands back up, the officer shot him in the arm four or five times. Reynolds told the officer, "You shot four bullets into him, sir. He was just getting his license and registration, sir." Reynolds also said "Please don't tell me he's dead", while Yanez exclaimed: "I told him not to reach for it! I told him to get his hand open!"

At one point in the video footage, an officer orders Reynolds to get on her knees and the sound of Reynolds being handcuffed can be heard. Reynolds' phone falls onto the ground but continues recording, and an officer periodically yells, "Fuck!" A video from the squad car of Joseph Kauser (where Reynolds and her daughter were put after Reynolds was handcuffed) shows Reynolds' daughter telling her, "Mom, please stop cussing and screaming 'cause I don't want you to get shooted". Reynolds was taken into custody, questioned at a police station, and released the following morning around 5:00 a.m.

According to police and emergency audio of the aftermath obtained by the Star Tribune, at 9:06 p.m., Kauser called in the shooting, reporting: "Shots fired. Larpenteur and Fry." The dispatcher answered: "Copy. You just heard it?" Yanez then screamed: "Code three!" Many officers then rushed to the scene. One officer reports, "One adult female being taken into custody. Driver at gunpoint. Juvenile female, child, is with [another officer]. We need a couple other squads to block off intersections." Another officer called in, "All officers are good. One suspect that needs medics."

The day following the shooting, Reynolds said that police had "treated me like a criminal ... like it was my fault." She also said that officers had failed to check Castile for a pulse or to see if he was breathing for several minutes after the shooting, and instead comforted the officer who had fired the shots. By that afternoon, her video had been viewed nearly 2.5 million times on Facebook.

=== Yanez statements ===
In the dashcam video of the incident, Yanez can be heard being questioned by St. Anthony police officer Tressa Sunde within minutes of the shooting, and telling her:

[Castile] was sitting in the car, seat belted. I told him, 'Can I see your license?' And then, he told me he had a firearm. I told him not to reach for it and (sigh) when he went down to grab, I told him not to reach for it (clears throat) and then he kept it right there, and I told him to take his hands off of it, and then he (sigh) he had his, his grip a lot wider than a wallet .... And I don't know where the gun was, he didn't tell me where the fucking gun was, and then it was just getting hinky, he gave, he was just staring ahead, and then I was getting fucking nervous, and then I told him, I know I fucking told him to get his fucking hand off his gun.

According to the official Minnesota Department of Public Safety's Bureau of Criminal Apprehension (BCA) transcript of the interview of Yanez and his attorneys Tom Kelly and Robert Fowler, Yanez stated that his justification for the shooting was based on fear for his own life because he believed that Castile's behavior was abusive toward a young girl passenger (Reynolds' daughter) in the car. Yanez said: "I thought, I was gonna die, and I thought if he's, if he has the, the guts and the audacity to smoke marijuana in front of the five-year-old girl and risk her lungs and risk her life by giving her secondhand smoke and the front seat passenger doing the same thing, then what, what care does he give about me?" The victim's previous marijuana use later became a focus of the defense, with a mason jar containing a small amount having been found in the car.

According to the local publication City Pages' description of the BCA conversation, Yanez "could never state definitively ... that he saw a firearm that day". Yanez uses "various terms to suggest the presence of a firearm". Yanez states, "it appeared to me that he was wrapping something around his fingers and almost like if I were to put my hand around my gun. It was dark inside the vehicle ..." At another point "it seemed like he was pulling out a gun and the barrel just kept coming." "I know he had an object and it was dark. And he was pulling it out with his right hand." He added: "It was, to me, it just looked big and apparent that he's gonna shoot you, he's gonna kill you."

In his court testimony almost a year later, Yanez was more definitive, testifying "I was able to see the firearm in Mr. Castile's hand, and that's when I engaged him." The gun was found to be in Castile's pocket when paramedics were preparing to load his fatally wounded body into an ambulance.

== Death and funeral ==
The Hennepin County Medical Examiner's office ruled Castile's death a homicide and said that he had sustained multiple gunshot wounds. The office reported that Castile died at 9:37 p.m. CDT in the emergency department of the Hennepin County Medical Center, about 20 minutes after being shot. On July 14, a funeral service for Castile took place at the Cathedral of Saint Paul, attended by thousands of mourners.

== Reactions ==
=== Statements of attorneys for Yanez and Castile family ===
The reasonableness of the initial traffic stop, and the facts of what occurred in the 103 seconds of the stop (between the end of the pre-stop police dispatcher radio and the beginning of Reynolds' recording) were "hotly disputed" almost immediately after the shooting occurred. On July 9, Yanez's attorney, Thomas Kelly of Minneapolis, said his client "reacted to the presence of that gun and the display of that gun" and that the shooting "had nothing to do with race. This had everything to do with the presence of a gun."

In the video recorded shortly after the shooting, Reynolds said that the car was pulled over for a broken taillight. Yanez's attorney Kelly stated following the shooting that his client stopped Castile in part because he resembled a suspect in an armed robbery that had taken place nearby four days earlier, and in part because of a broken taillight. A Castile family attorney, Albert Goins, questioned this account, said that if Yanez actually thought Castile was a robbery suspect, the police would have made a "felony traffic stop" (involving "bringing the suspect out at gunpoint while officers are in a position of cover and having them lie on the ground until they can identify who that individual is") rather than an ordinary traffic stop (in which officers stop the car and ask the driver to produce documents). Goins said, "Either [Castile] was a robbery suspect and [Yanez] didn't follow the procedures for a felony stop, or [Castile] was not a robbery suspect and [Yanez] shot a man because he stood at his window getting his information."

Kelly confirmed the authenticity of the pre-stop police audio, in which one officer reports that the driver resembled a recent robbery suspect due to his "wide-set nose." Goins said, "I can't imagine that it's reasonable suspicion to make a stop because somebody had a broad nose." The particular robbery to which the officer referred was identified as a July 2 armed robbery at a local convenience store, in which the two suspects were "described as black men with shoulder-length or longer dreadlocks" with no information about estimated height, weight or ages. Yanez was one of the police officers who had responded to the robbery. Subsequent investigations ruled out Castile as being one of the armed robbers.

Castile's mother Valerie Castile and her lawyer Glenda Hatchett called for the case to be referred to a special prosecutor and called for the U.S. Department of Justice to conduct a federal investigation.

=== Protests and civil unrest ===
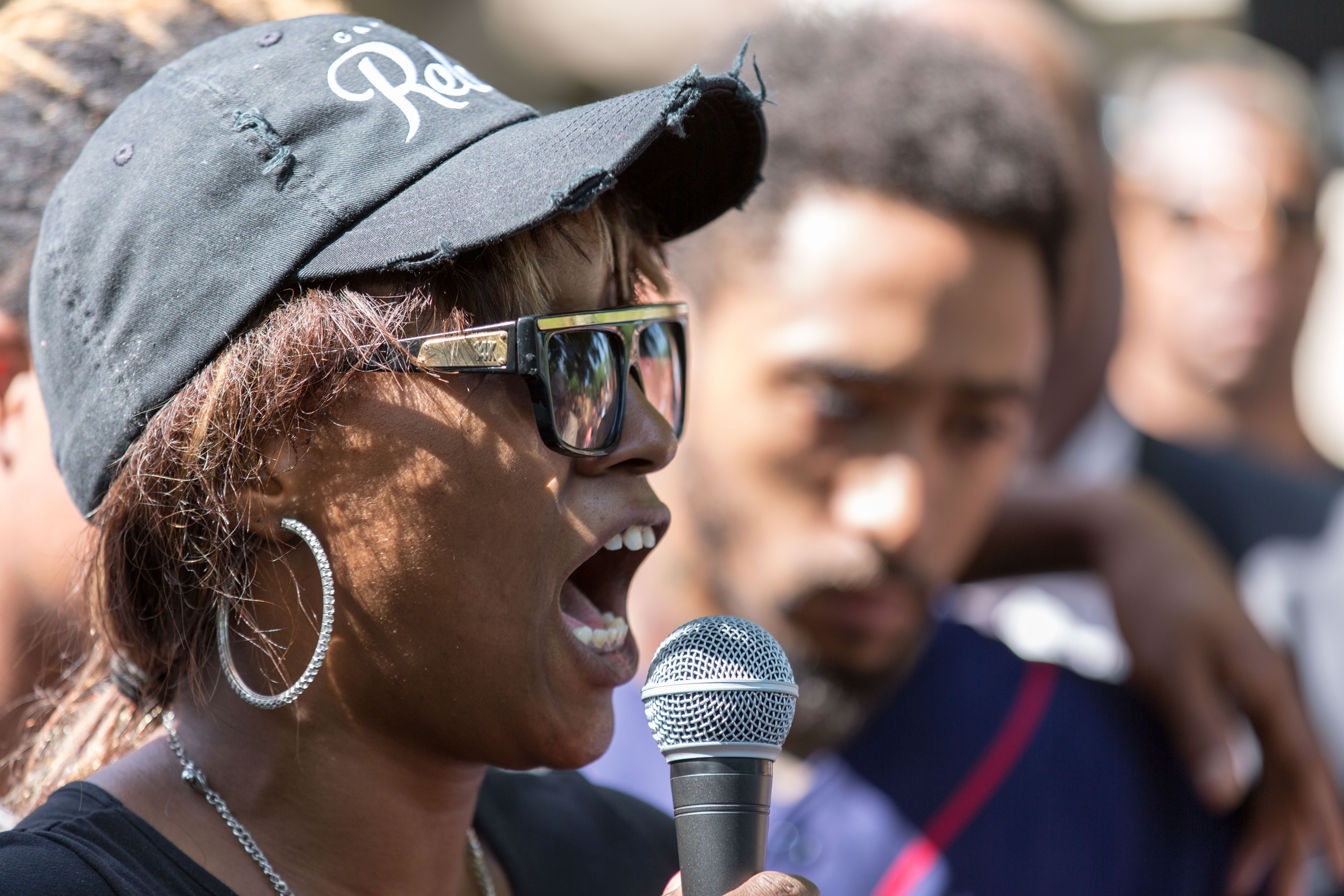
Diamond Reynolds speaking at a rally in memory of her boyfriend on the day after his death

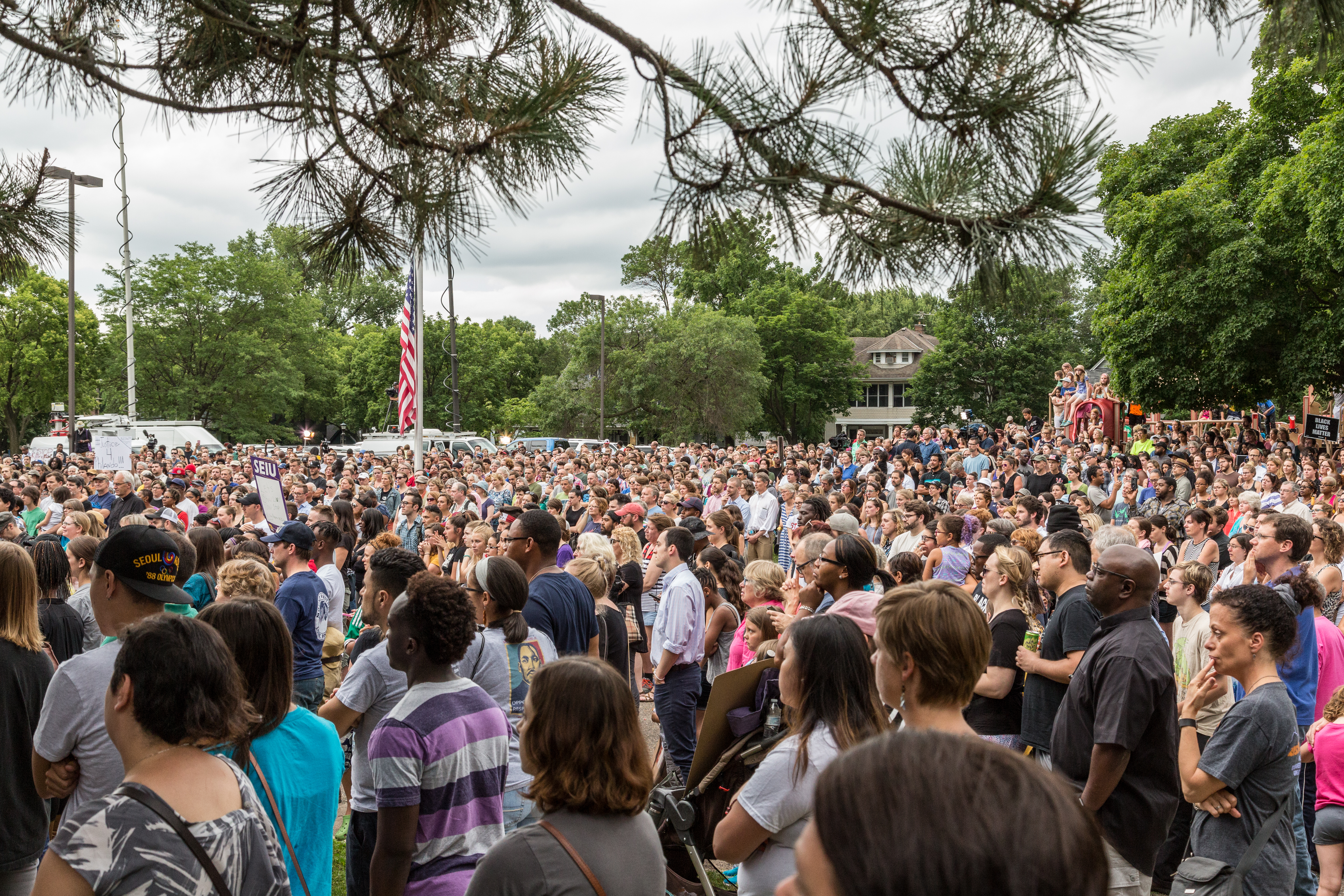
Black Lives Matter protesting in Saint Paul, Minnesota, on July 7

By 12:30 a.m. on July 7, about three hours after the shooting, protesters gathered at the scene, "peaceful but visibly angry". More than 200 people were present. After news of Castile's death spread, crowds of protestors gathered outside the Minnesota Governor's Residence in St. Paul, chanting Castile's name and demanding that then-Governor Mark Dayton make a statement. That night, demonstrations in St. Paul continued, remaining "peaceful but forceful".

Nekima Levy-Pounds, president of the Minneapolis chapter of the NAACP, said that her group would request a federal investigation. She also called for an independent body to investigate the shooting, expressing skepticism with the state agency that is leading the investigation of the incident, the Minnesota Bureau of Criminal Apprehension, a division of the Department of Public Safety. NAACP president Cornell William Brooks said, "I'm waiting to hear the human outcry from Second Amendment defenders over [this incident]..." Black Lives Matter activist DeRay Mckesson said, "Philando Castile should be alive today". On July 8, over 1,000 demonstrators shut down Interstate 880 in Oakland, California, for several hours to protest Castile's shooting death and that of Alton Sterling the day before.

After two days of peaceful protests and vigils, violence between protesters and police in St. Paul broke out on July 9 and 10. Some 102 people were arrested and 21 officers (15 police officers and six Minnesota State Patrol officers) had been injured, one of them seriously. A group threw rocks, bottles, and Molotov cocktails at police and police used pepper spray and tear gas to disperse the crowd. The protesters caused Interstate 94 in between Minnesota State Highway 280 and downtown St. Paul to be closed. After they were dispersed from the highway, another group of protests took place at Dale and Grand Avenue. The violence was condemned by President Obama, Governor Dayton, St. Paul Mayor Chris Coleman, and Police Chief Todd Axtell, who called for calm.

After the shooting, a number of activists established an encampment outside of the Governor's Residence. On July 18, demonstrators cleared the encampment and moved off the road after police directed them to move, saying that they could continue to protest "as long as it was done on the sidewalk" and did not impede vehicle or pedestrian traffic. The interactions between police and demonstrators were peaceful, and no arrests were made.

On July 19, 21 protesters—mostly members of the St. Paul and Minneapolis teachers' federations—were arrested willingly at a protest in Minneapolis after blocking a street in Minneapolis and refusing orders to disperse. The teachers marched from the Minneapolis Convention Center (where an American Federation of Teachers convention was being held) to the Nicollet Mall area; they were cited for misdemeanor public nuisance and released.

=== Government officials ===
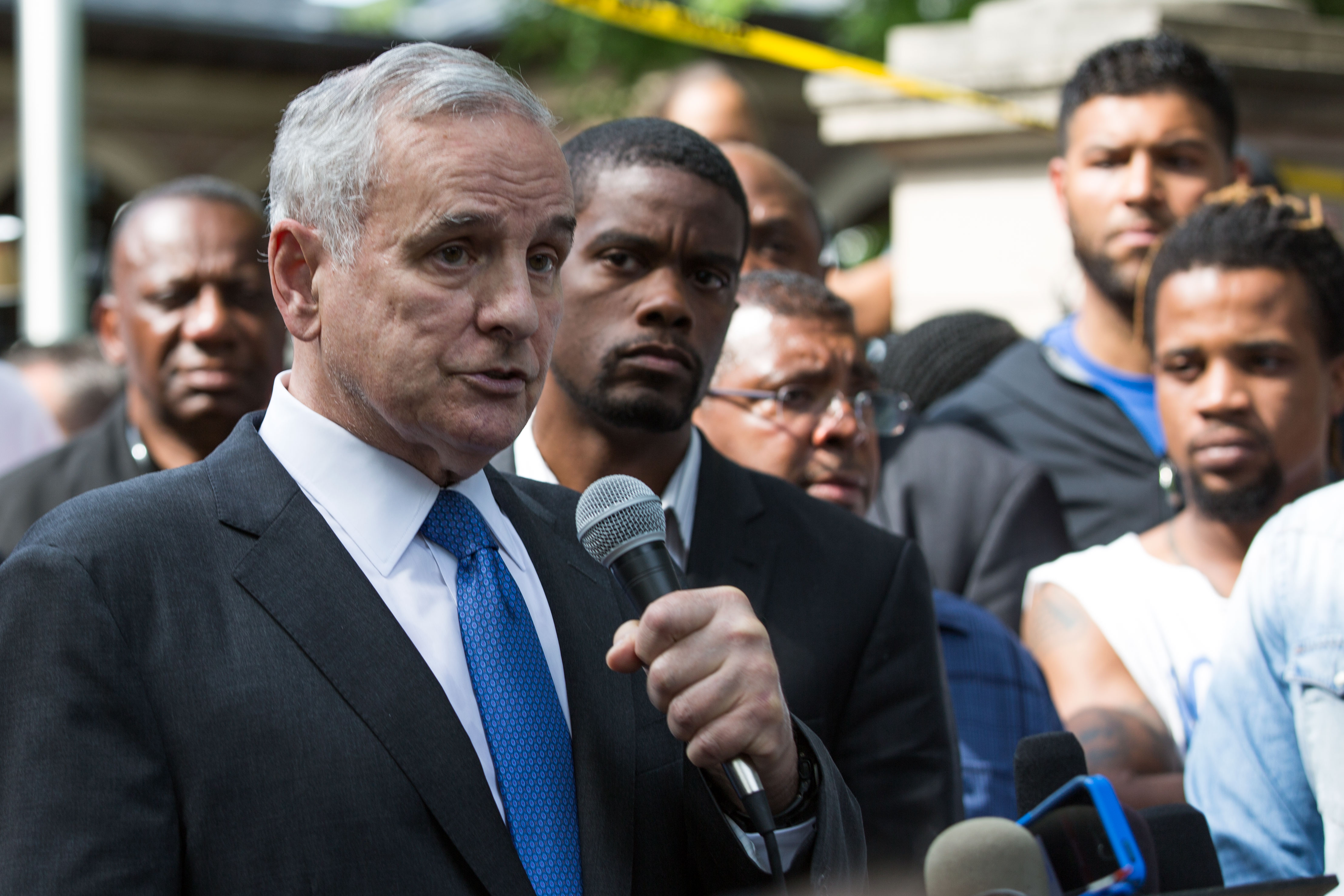
Minnesota Governor Mark Dayton speaking outside his residence in Saint Paul

Later in the morning of July 7, Governor Dayton appeared outside his residence and said:

My deepest condolences go out to the family and friends. On behalf of all decent-minded Minnesotans, we are shocked and horrified by what occurred last night. This kind of behavior is unacceptable. It is not the norm in Minnesota. I promise ... to see that this matter is brought to justice and all avenues are pursued and do a complete investigation. Justice will be served in Minnesota.

Dayton said he had requested an independent U.S. Department of Justice investigation and had spoken to White House Chief of Staff Denis McDonough about the matter. Dayton also commented, "Would this have happened if those passengers would have been white? I don't think it would have." He promised to "do everything in my power to help protect the integrity" of the ongoing parallel state investigation "to ensure a proper and just outcome for all involved."

U.S. Representative Betty McCollum, Democrat of Minnesota, whose district includes the place where Castile was shot, called for a Justice Department investigation, and U.S. Senator Al Franken, Democrat of Minnesota, also called for a federal investigation, saying in a statement: "I am horrified that we are forced to confront yet another death of a young African-American man at the hands of law enforcement. And I am heartbroken for Philando's family and loved ones, whose son, brother, boyfriend, and nephew was taken from them last night." Former U.S. Representative Keith Ellison, current Attorney General of Minnesota, denounced the "systematic targeting of African Americans and a systematic lack of accountability."

Speaking shortly after the shootings of Castile and Alton Sterling, President Barack Obama did not comment on the specific incidents, but called on the U.S. to "do better" and said that controversial incidents arising from the police use of force were "not isolated incidents" but rather were "symptomatic of a broader set of racial disparities that exist in our criminal justice system". Obama expressed "extraordinary appreciation and respect for the vast majority of police officers" and noted the difficult nature of the job. He stated, "When incidents like this occur, there's a big chunk of our citizenry that feels as if, because of the color of their skin, they are not being treated the same, and that hurts, and that should trouble all of us. This is not just a black issue, not just a Hispanic issue. This is an American issue that we all should care about." Obama telephoned Castile's mother to offer his condolences.

=== International response ===
Following the shooting of Castile, Sterling, and police officers in Dallas, the Bahamian government, a Caribbean island nation with an over 90% citizenry of Afro-Bahamian origin, issued a travel advisory to its citizens in the United States, stating "[i]n particular young [Bahamian] males are asked to exercise extreme caution in affected cities in their interactions with the police. Do not be confrontational and cooperate". Travel advisories were also issued by the United Arab Emirates and Bahrain, warning for caution in the United States due to ongoing violence and the U.S. "gun culture", and to avoid crowded areas, protests, and demonstrations as "civil disorder can result".

=== National Rifle Association vs. Second Amendment Foundation ===
The National Rifle Association (NRA), which lobbies for the rights of gun owners, issued a statement two days after the shooting saying: "The reports from Minnesota are troubling and must be thoroughly investigated. In the meantime, it is important for the NRA not to comment while the investigation is ongoing." By contrast, the NRA had issued a statement within hours of the 2016 shooting of Dallas police officers; many saw this as a double standard. On July 9, 2017, responding to allegations of racism, NRA spokesperson Dana Loesch said the death of Castile is "absolutely awful". On August 10, 2017, Loesch explained NRA's reluctance to defend Castile by arguing he was not legally carrying his handgun at the time of the shooting due to his marijuana possession. She added that his "Permit should've been out & hands not moving", and that the law enforcement officer should have asked Castile where his firearm was kept. Many NRA members believed that the NRA did not do enough to defend Castile's right to own a gun.

The Second Amendment Foundation in contrast immediately issued a strong statement for an independent investigation after the shooting, with founder Alan Gottlieb stating, "Exercising our right to bear arms should not translate to a death sentence over something so trivial as a traffic stop for a broken tail light, and we are going to watch this case with a magnifying glass."

== Investigation and prosecution ==
=== Official investigation ===
The day after the fatal shooting, the St. Anthony Police Department identified Yanez as the officer who fired the fatal shots at Castile. Yanez and his partner Kauser were placed on paid administrative leave.

The Minnesota Bureau of Criminal Apprehension (BCA) was the lead agency in charge of the investigation. Two days following the shooting, Ramsey County Attorney John Choi called for a "prompt and thorough" investigation into the shooting. He said that he had not determined whether he would use a grand jury, but stated that if either a grand jury or prosecutors in his office determined that charges were appropriate, he would "prosecute this case to the fullest extent of the law."

The BCA said that squad-car video and "several" other videos had been collected as evidence. St. Anthony police did not wear body cameras. On September 28, 2016, the BCA announced that it had completed its investigation and turned over its findings to Ramsey County Attorney John Choi. Prosecutors in the Ramsey County Attorney's Office would decide whether to file charges in the shooting or bring the case to a grand jury.

=== Charges and prosecution ===
Choi reviewed the evidence with assistance from the Federal Bureau of Investigation, the U.S. Attorney's office, a retired deputy chief of police in Irvine, California, and a former federal prosecutor. Seven weeks after receiving the BCA report, Choi announced that Yanez was being charged with second degree manslaughter and two counts of dangerous discharge of a firearm. Choi stated:

To justify the use of deadly force, it is not enough, however, for the police officer to merely express a subjective fear of death or great bodily harm. Unreasonable fear cannot justify the use of deadly force. The use of deadly force must be objectively reasonable and necessary, given the totality of the circumstances. Based upon our thorough and exhaustive review of the facts of this case, it is my conclusion that the use of deadly force by Officer Yanez was not justified, and that sufficient facts exist to prove that to be true. Accordingly, we filed a criminal complaint this morning in Ramsey County.

In his press conference announcing his decision to prosecute Yanez, Choi noted facts not consistent with a justified fear of Castile, namely that Yanez's partner, Officer Kauser, who was standing at the car's passenger window during the shooting, "did not touch or remove his gun from its holster", and that in his answers to questioning by Saint Anthony Police Officer Tressa Sunde immediately after the shooting, Yanez "stated he did not know where [Castile's] gun was". Choi also noted that:

- "Philando Castile was not resisting or fleeing."
- "There was absolutely no criminal intent exhibited by him throughout this encounter."
- "He was respectful and compliant based upon the instructions and orders he was given."
- "He volunteered in good faith that he had a firearm – beyond what the law requires."
- "He emphatically stated that he wasn't pulling it out."
- "His movement was restricted by his own seat belt."
- "He was accompanied, in his vehicle, by a woman and a young child."
- "Philando Castile did not exhibit any intent, nor did he have any reason, to shoot Officer Yanez."
- "In fact, his dying words were in protest that he wasn't reaching for his gun."

According to author and former FBI agent Larry Brubaker, who has written two books on officer-involved shootings, "this is the first time an officer has been charged for a fatal shooting in Minnesota in more than 200 cases that spanned over three decades".

=== Trial and verdict ===
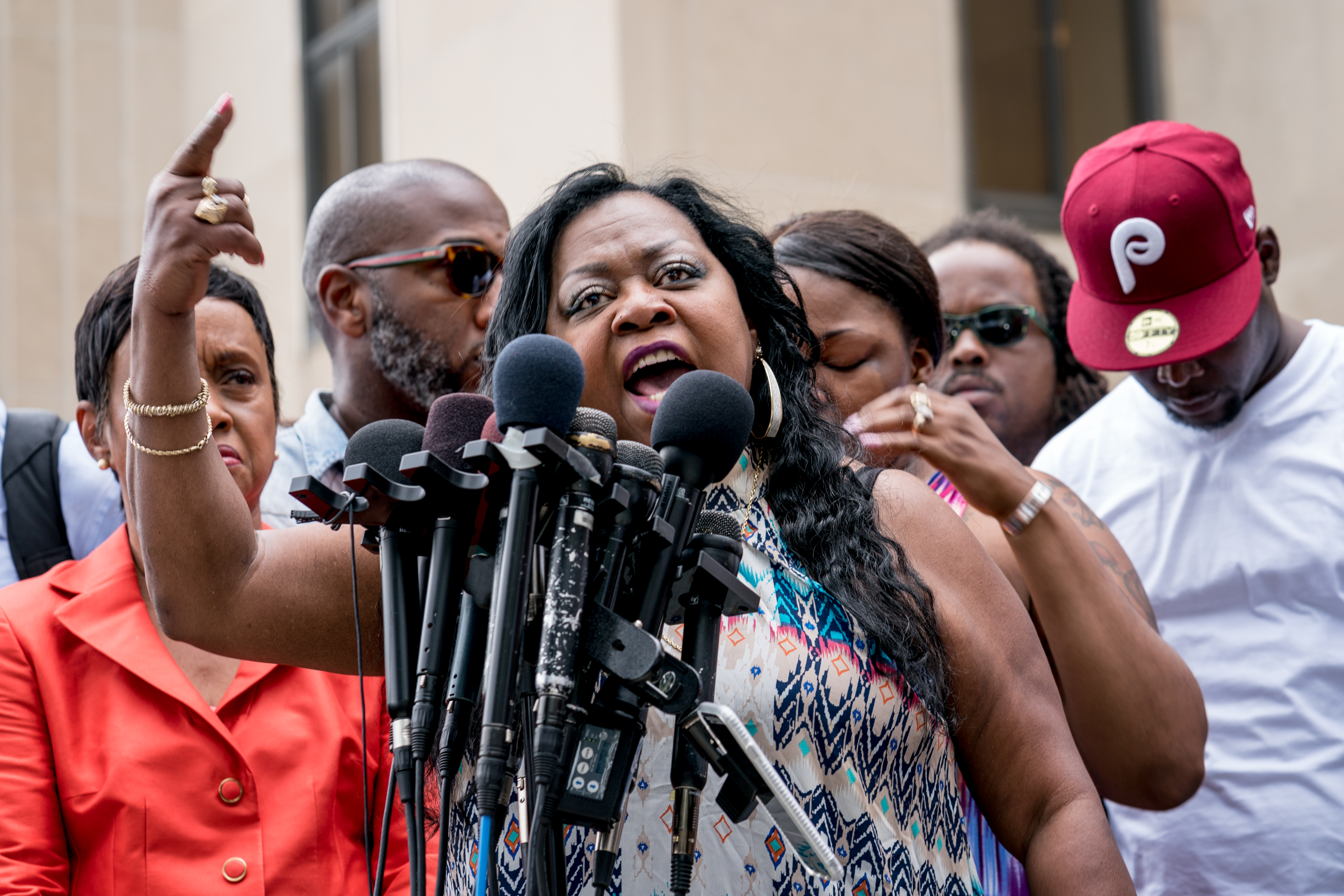
Philando's mother, Valerie Castile, speaking at a press conference shortly after the verdict was announced

The trial of Yanez began May 30, 2017, under Judge William H. Leary III. Yanez would have faced up to 10 years under Minnesota law if he had been convicted.

After five days and more than 25 hours of deliberation, the 12-member jury decided that the state had not met its burden for a conviction. The vote was initially 10–2 in favor of acquitting Yanez; after further deliberation the two remaining jurors were also swayed to acquit. The jury consisted of seven men and five women. Two jurors were black. Following the acquittal, a jury member told the press that the specific wording of the law regarding culpable negligence was the main factor among many leading to the verdict. One juror who later spoke anonymously said:

What we were looking at was some pretty obscure things to a lot of people, like culpable negligence. You think you might know what it means: It's negligent, but maybe pretty bad negligence. Well, it's gross negligence with an element of recklessness ... We had the law in front of us so we could break it down.

It just came down to us not being able to see what was going on in the car. Some of us were saying that there was some recklessness there, but that didn't stick because we didn't know what escalated the situation: was he really seeing a gun? We felt [Yanez] was an honest guy ... and in the end, we had to go on his word, and that's what it came down to.

=== Aftermath of verdict ===
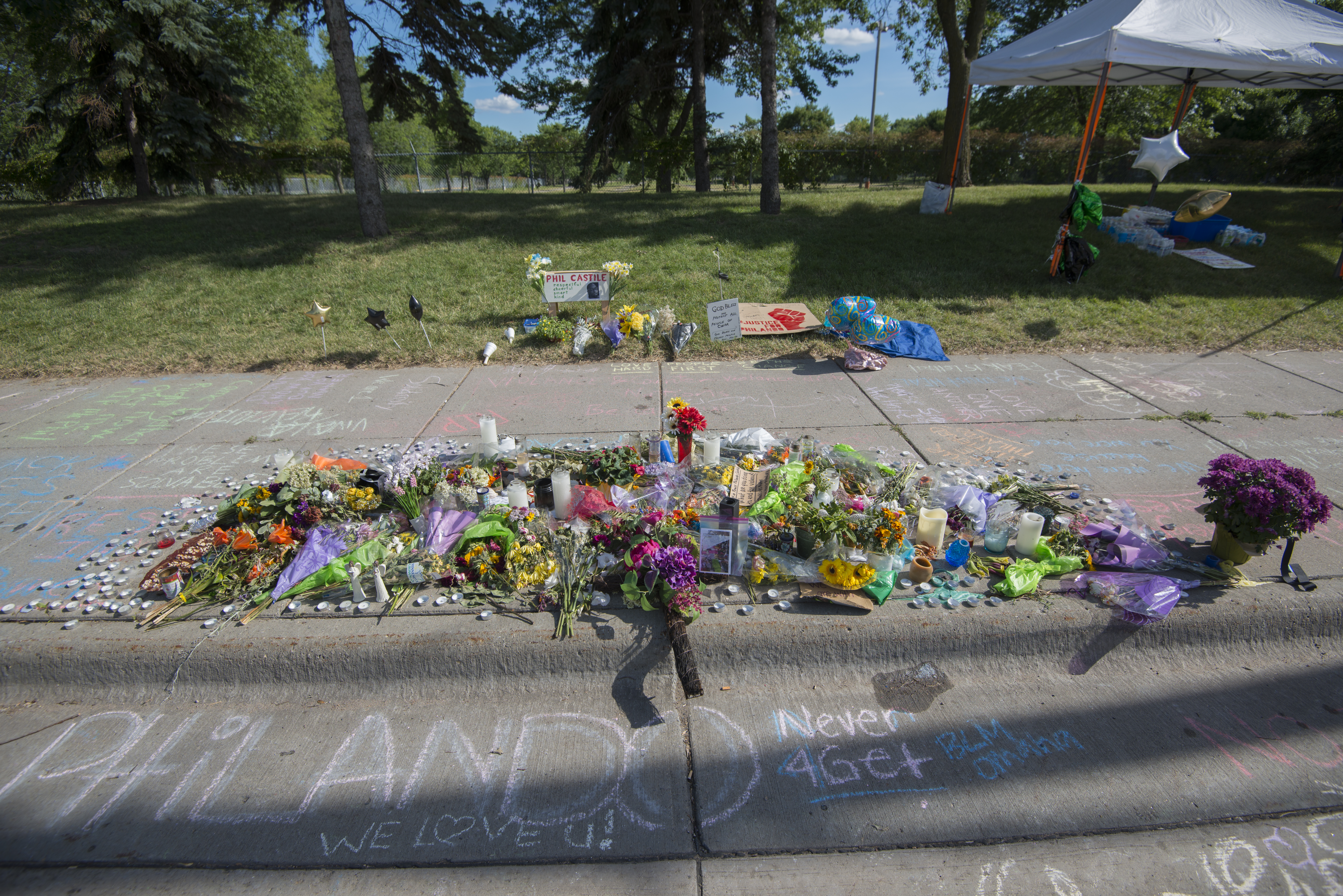
Memorial at the shooting site in July 2016

The day the verdict was announced, the city of St. Anthony announced that "the public will be best served if Officer Yanez is no longer a police officer in our city", and that he would not be returning to the police department from leave after the trial. As revealed by the Associated Press a few weeks later, Yanez received $48,500 as part of his separation agreement with the city, in addition to payment for unused compensatory time.

Some 2,000 protesters marched in the streets, eventually blocking Interstate 94, where 18 people were arrested, including at least one reporter.

Members of the Castile family, who had worked closely with authorities throughout the trial, expressed shock and outrage at the verdict, and a loss of faith in the system. Although they had earlier discussed a federal civil rights lawsuit, on June 26, 2017, the family released a joint statement with the city of St. Anthony announcing a settlement worth $2.995 million.

On June 20, 2017, dashcam footage seen by investigators and members of the courtroom during the trial was released to public. On June 21, 2017, Ramsey County released additional evidence, including footage taken inside Yanez's squad car which shows Diamond Reynolds' daughter comforting her mother after the shooting.

In mid-2017, the Saint Anthony city council adjusted the city's police contract so that financial liability falls to its served communities, rather than Saint Anthony itself. With this increase in cost, Falcon Heights voted to end the contract and find a new police provider. The Ramsey County Sheriff was to police Falcon Heights in 2018. The 2017 Falcon Heights city council election centered on how the city should be policed.

== Legacy ==
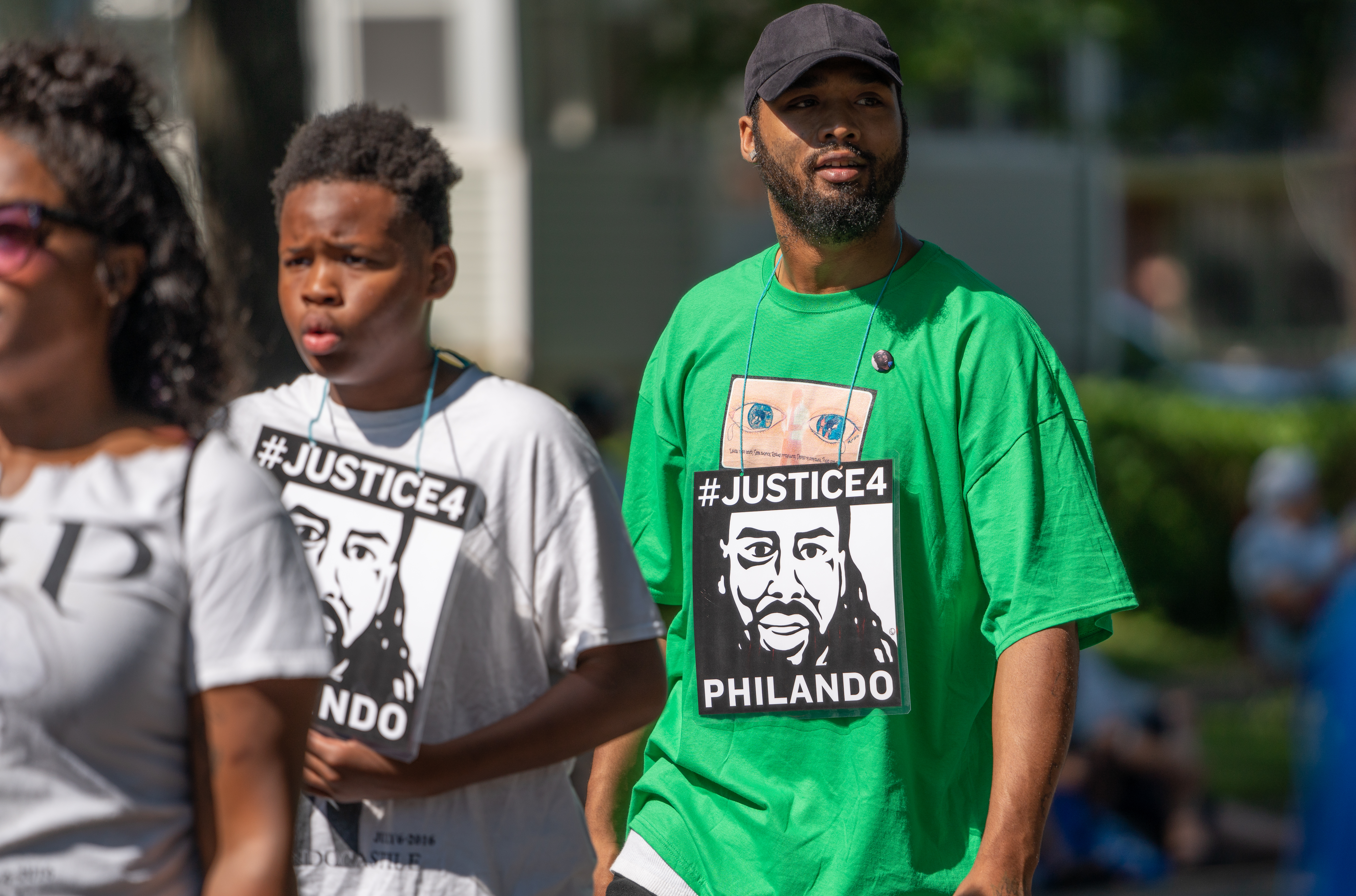
"Justice 4 Philando" signs at the Rondo Days parade, 2018

In honor of Castile, the Philando Castile Memorial Scholarship has been started at St. Paul Central High School. The inaugural $5,000 award was given to Marques Watson in 2017.

Castile, a school cafeteria worker, frequently paid for lunches for students who owed money or could not afford to pay. Inspired by this example, the Philando Castile Relief Foundation was created. The charity focuses on paying school lunch debts and addressing gun violence in the Minneapolis area. The charity's money comes in part from a civil settlement between Castile's family and the city of St. Anthony. In April 2019, the foundation gave $8,000 to wipe out the accumulated lunch debt of all seniors at Robbinsdale Cooper High School in New Hope, Minn. The debt was threatening the ability of students to graduate. The foundation earlier gave $10,000 for school lunches to the J.J. Hill Montessori Magnet School where Philando Castile worked. Valerie Castile spoke at U.S. House Representative Ilhan Omar's press conference on a bill ending the shaming of students who owe meal debt.

In 2017, New Zealand-born artist Luke Willis Thompson filmed Reynolds for an artwork titled Autoportrait. He intended the work as a "sister image" to her filmed footage. The work was first presented at Chisenhale Gallery in London in 2017.

Jazz composer Billy Childs released a single-movement sonata/tone poem for violin and piano, "Incident on Larpenteur Avenue," in response to the shooting in 2017. Childs described writing the piece as cathartic, processing his feelings in response to the shooting. The score contains a run of plucked notes mimicking the gunshots that killed Castile.

In 2026 the incident and the role of Reynolds' livestream video were profiled in #WhileBlack, a documentary film by Sidney Fussell and Jennifer Holness.

== See also ==
- List of killings by law enforcement officers in Minnesota
- List of killings by law enforcement officers in the United States
- Shooting of Justine Damond
- Weapons effect
