= Home Again (2012 film) =

2012 film

- Film poster
- Directed by: Sudz Sutherland
- Written by: Jennifer Holness; Sudz Sutherland
- Starring: Lyriq Bent
- Cinematography: Arthur E. Cooper
- Release dates: 12 September 2012 (TIFF); 22 March 2013 (Canada)
- Running time: 101 minutes
- Country: Canada
- Language: English

Home Again is a 2012 Canadian drama film directed by Sudz Sutherland, shot primarily in Trinidad and Tobago and set in Kingston, Jamaica, about three people who have been deported back to Jamaica, despite having lived in Canada, the United States and the United Kingdom for most of their lives.

== Production ==
Sutherland and Holness first approached the National Film Board of Canada (NFB) to make a documentary, but their proposal was declined. Instead, the NFB later supported them to do research in Jamaica for a fiction film, which included interviewing 40 deportees in Kingston and Ocho Rios.

== Cast ==
- Lyriq Bent as Dunston Williams
- Stephan James as Everton St.Clair
- Fefe Dobson as Cherry C.
- Richard Chevolleau as Jammix
- Paul Campbell as Uncle Archie Morris
- Kadeem Wilson as Jim "The Don" Gilbert
- Brian Brown as Ras Leon
- Tatyana Ali as Marva Johnson
