= She's the Mayor =

2011 Canadian television sitcom

- Created by: Min Sook Lee; Jennifer Holness; Sudz Sutherland
- Starring: Janet-Laine Green
- Country of origin: Canada

Original release
- Network: VisionTV
- Release: 2011

She's the Mayor is a Canadian television sitcom which aired on Vision TV in 2011. The show stars Janet-Laine Green as Iris Peters, a woman in her 60s who is newly elected as the mayor of the fictional city of Fairfax.

The show's cast also includes Scott Wentworth as deputy mayor Bill Clarke, Colin Mochrie as city manager Scott Hawkins, and Tonya Lee Williams as Peters' communications director Maxine Williams.

Filmed in Hamilton, Ontario, the series was created by Min Sook Lee, Jennifer Holness and Sudz Sutherland.
