= Love, Sex and Eating the Bones =

- Love, Sex and Eating the Bones promotional movie poster
- Directed by: David "Sudz" Sutherland
- Written by: David "Sudz" Sutherland
- Produced by: Jennifer Holness
- Starring: Hill Harper
- Cinematography: Arthur E. Cooper
- Edited by: Jeff Warren
- Music by: Mischa Chillak, Kenny Neal
- Distributed by: ThinkFilm (2004) (United States); Velocity Home Entertainment (USA)
- Release dates: September 6, 2003 (Toronto International Film Festival); March 5, 2004
- Running time: 104 minutes
- Country: Canada
- Language: English
- Budget: $2.5 million

Love, Sex and Eating the Bones is a 2003 Canadian romantic comedy film directed and written by Sudz Sutherland, featuring a mostly African American and Black Canadian leading cast. It premiered and played twice at the 2003 Toronto International Film Festival, where it won the award for Best Canadian First Feature Film.

== Synopsis ==
Michael (Hill Harper) is a likable photographer turned security guard who spends his time hanging out with his buddies and keeping up with the latest releases at Pornocopia. His addiction to porn, however, threatens to get in the way of a budding romance with Jasmine (Marlyne Afflack), an upscale marketing researcher who's so wary of ‘playas’ she's declared herself celibate.

== Cast ==
Actor	Role
Hill Harper	Michael Joseph
Marlyne Afflack	Jasmine LeJeune (credited as Marlyne N. Afflack)
Mark Taylor	Glenroy 'Sweets' Lindo
Marieka Weathered	Lisette
Kai Soremekun	Peaches LeJeune
Karen Robinson	Heather Taylor
Jennifer Baxter	Trish Papandreou
Ed Robertson	Kennedy
Jason Harrow	Andre Patterson (credited as Kardinal Offishall)
Kenny Robinson	Robbie MacKinnon
Ayumi Iizuka	Gemma Dower
Christopher Lee Clements	Phil E. Butts
Neil Crone	Anthony Mingelli
Lanomie Baird	Older Customer
Catherine McNally	Phyllis Himes
Stewart Arnott	Daryl Keyes
Jocelyne Zucco	Fred Koa
David Huband	Xavier MacDonald
Blak Beauté	Kenny "Kumm" Kornishsky

== Reception ==
Rick Groen of The Globe and Mail awarded the film three stars. On the review aggregator Rotten Tomatoes, the film has an approval rating of 57% based on 7 reviews, with an average rating of 6/10.
