= Playing House (2006 film) =

- DVD cover
- Written by: M.A. Lovretta; Patricia Pearson
- Directed by: Kelly Makin
- Starring: Colin Ferguson; Joanne Kelly; Lucas Bryant
- Theme music composer: Robert Carli
- Country of origin: Canada
- Original language: English

Production
- Producers: Daphne Ballon; Suzanne L. Berger; Brian Dennis; Noreen Halpern; Anne Marie La Traverse; John Morayniss
- Cinematography: Thom Best
- Editor: Teresa Hannigan
- Running time: 94 minutes

Original release
- Network: CTV
- Release: March 24, 2006

Playing House is a 2006 television film that was originally shown on CTV in Canada. It was produced by Blueprint Entertainment. The movie is based on the book of the same name by Patricia Pearson.

== Plot ==
Frannie and Calvin, a couple in their late twenties in Manhattan, had been dating for a few months when Frannie discovers she is pregnant. Calvin leaves on a tour with his band before Frannie finds the courage to tell him about the pregnancy. Frannie goes home to visit her parents just outside Toronto where her mother convinces her to tell Calvin, though the cell phone signal is weak and distorted and she believes he hung up on her. On her way back to New York a border guard refuses Frannie entrance to the USA as her visa has expired. When she says she has her apartment and job in New York she receives no sympathy. She then confesses to being with child hoping to gain some understanding from the female border guard. The border guard then bars her from entry to the USA for 12 months. Frannie is forced to do her work as a magazine editor from her parents’ home. Calvin shows up a little while later at Frannie's parents' home. Calvin and Frannie soon realise they have no idea how to cook, keep house, or raise a child and their relationship deteriorates. Michael Tate, a famous writer, offers to help Frannie get her visa reinstated because of the difficulties of having Frannie work remotely as his editor. Frannie moves back to Manhattan and begins to develop a relationship with Michael. In the end Frannie realises that the glamour and romance Michael has to offer is not what she wants and she seeks out Calvin who has returned to New York and his experimental jazz band that incorporates 'found instruments'.

== Cast ==
- Joanne Kelly as Frannie McKenzie
  - Nina Dobrev as young Frannie
- Lucas Bryant as Calvin Puddie
- Colin Ferguson as Michael Tate
- Michael Murphy as Hubbard
- Rosemary Dunsmore as Madeline
- Kristin Lehman as Marina

== Home media ==
Playing House was released on DVD in Australia (Region 4) in 1.78:1 widescreen PAL with a Dolby Digital 2.0 audio track. It is rated PG for mild sexual references and moderate coarse language by Australian rating standards. Playing House has also been released on DVD in South Africa.

On April 26, 2011, Playing House was released on Region 1 DVD in the U.S. by A&E Home Video under its Lifetime label.
