= Kai Soremekun =

Canadian filmmaker and actor

- Born: Lisa Olabisi Abosede Soremekun; Hamilton, Canada
- Occupations: Filmmaker, actor
- Years active: 1991–current
- Website: http://whoischick.com/

Kai Soremekun is a Canadian filmmaker and actor. She has dual Canadian/US citizenship and lives in Los Angeles. She is best known for the 1991 film Regarding Henry, which starred Harrison Ford and Annette Bening, the 1995 film Heat, which starred Robert De Niro and Al Pacino, and the ongoing web series CHICK: Within Me Lives a Superhero.

== Early life ==
Kai was born in Hamilton, and grew up in Toronto, Canada. Her father was a Nigerian doctor and her mother an English nurse, who met while working at the same hospital in Hamilton. She has two younger brothers. Most of her childhood years were spent in Thornhill, a suburb of Toronto.

She attended Thornlea Secondary School, then studied at the American Musical and Dramatic Academy in New York City, where she completed a two-year Certificate in Professional Performance.

== Career ==
Kai Soremekun started her career in commercials, acting and dancing in music videos, and modeling for Nike in New York City.

She took a job on the set of Regarding Henry, as an extra, in a bid to gain experience and make some money. During the course of filming, the director decided to give her the role of Loretta in a single scene with Harrison Ford and Bill Nunn.

In 1993, she moved to Los Angeles, where she was cast in the role of Denise on The Fresh Prince of Bel-Air.

In 1995, she landed a series regular role on a Fox television drama called Medicine Ball. During 1995 and 1996, KS studied filmmaking at Los Angeles City College.

While spending time with her parents in Toronto in 2002, she was cast in the TV movie, Heart of a Stranger. The film was shot in Halifax, Canada. Again, in 2003, she was chosen as a last minute replacement for the role of Peaches LeJeune in Love, Sex and Eating the Bones while on a holiday in Canada.

In 2006, Kai Soremekun was chosen to be a part of a program at CBS, which partnered young people with experienced directors. She was partnered with Jerry Levine while he directed an episode of Monk. He suggested she audition and she won a small role in that episode.

In 2007, she was selected by Steven Spielberg as a contestant on On the Lot, a short-lived reality show competition produced by Steven Spielberg and Mark Burnett. The show, which aired on Fox, featured filmmakers competing in weekly elimination competitions, with the ultimate prize of a million dollar development deal at DreamWorks. Soremekun was eliminated after one round.

== Acting ==
Soremekun has appeared in the following films and television shows.

=== Film ===
- 1991: Regarding Henry - Loretta
- 1993: Back in Action - Tara
- 1995: Heat - Prostitute
- 1999: What We Did That Night (TV Movie) - Tera
- 2002: Heart of a Stranger (TV Movie)
- 2003: Love, Sex and Eating the Bones - Peaches LeJeune
- 2014: Everything That Rises Must Converge

=== Television ===
- 1993: The Fresh Prince of Bel-Air - Denise
- 1995: Medicine Ball - Dr. Nia James
- 1999: Seven Days - Linda
- 2006: Monk - Mayor's Assistant

=== Web series ===
- 2009-2010: CHICK: Within Me Lives a Superhero - Lisa / Fantastica

== Directing ==
Soremekun has directed the following films and web series.

=== Short films ===
- 2001 Maple
- 2002 The Style of My Soul
- 2003 Lock Her Room
- 2007 Lily and Grant
- 2007 The Timer Game

=== Web series ===
- 2009 CHICK: Within Me Lives a Superhero
