= WhileBlack =

2026 Canadian documentary film

#WhileBlack
- Directed by: Sidney Fussell; Jennifer Holness
- Written by: Sidney Fussell; Jennifer Holness; Ann Shin
- Produced by: Ann Shin; Mariam Bastani; Sidney Fussell
- Starring: Darnella Frazier; Diamond Reynolds
- Cinematography: Ricardo Diaz; Amber Fares; Christian Bielz
- Edited by: Mark Staunton
- Music by: Todor Kobakov
- Production company: Fathom Film Group
- Release date: March 13, 2026 (SXSW)
- Running time: 84 minutes
- Countries: Canada; United States
- Language: English

#WhileBlack is an American-Canadian documentary film, directed by Sidney Fussell and Jennifer Holness and released in 2026. The film profiles Darnella Frazier, the woman who became caught up in the murder of George Floyd when her documentation of the incident for social media played a key role in undermining the police's official account of the events, and Diamond Reynolds, the woman whose livestream played a similar role following the killing of Philando Castile.

The film premiered on March 13, 2026, at the 2026 South by Southwest Film & TV Festival, and had its Canadian premiere on April 24 at the Hot Docs Canadian International Documentary Festival.
