= Darnella Frazier =

Witness to the murder of George Floyd (born 2003)

- Born: March 23, 2003 (age 23); Saint Paul, Minnesota, U.S.
- Education: Roosevelt High School
- Known for: Filming the murder of George Floyd; Receiving a Pulitzer Prize special citation
- Relatives: Leneal Frazier (uncle)

Darnella Frazier (born March 23, 2003) is an American woman who recorded the murder of George Floyd on May 25, 2020, posting her video on Facebook and Instagram. The video undermined the initial account of Floyd's death by the Minneapolis Police Department, and served as evidence leading to criminal charges against four police officers. Frazier testified during the trial, which ended with the conviction of Derek Chauvin on murder charges, and the convictions of the other three officers on manslaughter. She received a special award and citation from the Pulitzer Prize board in 2021.

== Early life ==
Darnella Frazier was born and raised in Saint Paul, Minnesota, and attended Roosevelt High School in Minneapolis. She has several siblings. Described by her lawyer as a normal teenager "with a boyfriend and a job at the mall," Frazier was a high school junior at the time of Floyd's murder.

== Video of George Floyd ==
=== Murder of George Floyd ===
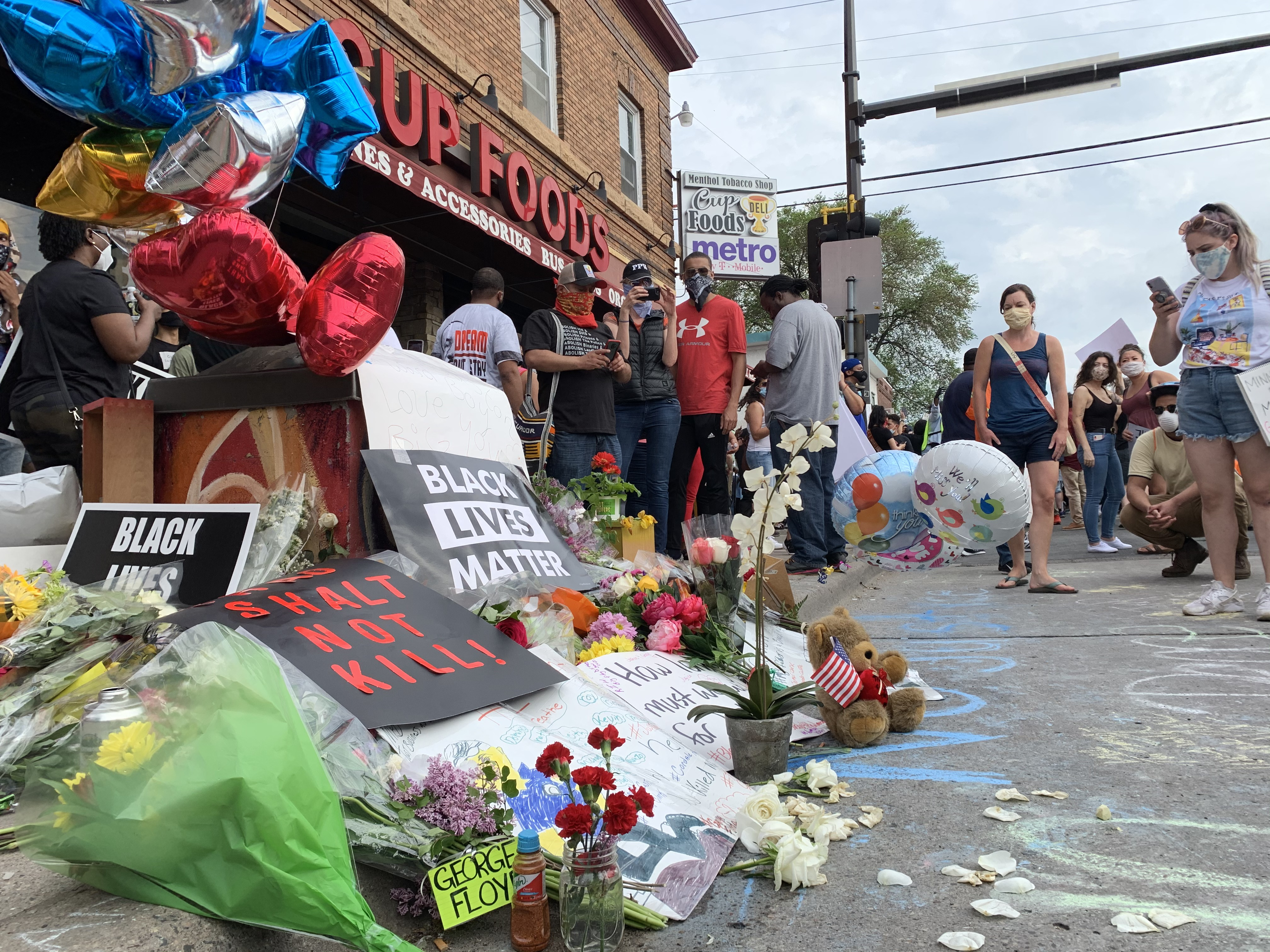
Cup Foods in Minneapolis the day after Floyd's murder, May 26, 2020

On May 25, 2020, Frazier walked to the Cup Foods grocery store with her nine-year-old cousin, who wanted to buy snacks. Before they could enter the store, they saw the police restraining George Floyd on the pavement. Frazier sent her cousin into the store and then began filming the encounter with her phone. Twenty seconds after she started filming, Floyd said "I can't breathe", which was repeated by protesters worldwide on the days and weeks that followed. The video showed Chauvin kneeling on Floyd's neck until he died, and records Floyd's distressed comments, such as, "My stomach hurts. My neck hurts. Everything hurts. I need some water or something, please. Please," and "They're going to kill me, man," and then, "Don't kill me." He called out for his "Mama" and said, "I'm through". Her video lasted ten minutes and nine seconds, until Floyd's lifeless body was carried away on a stretcher.

=== George Floyd video and protests ===
At 1:46 a.m. on May 26, Frazier posted her video to Facebook and Instagram, adding the caption: "They killed him right in front of cup foods over south on 38th and Chicago!! No type of sympathy </3 </3 #POLICEBRUTALITY." Her video quickly went viral. When the Minneapolis Police Department issued a misleading statement about Floyd's murder called "Man Dies After Medical Incident During Police Interaction," Frazier responded at 3:10 a.m., saying "Medical incident??? Watch outtt they killed him and the proof is clearlyyyy there!!"

In a statement released by her lawyer, Frazier said, "I opened my phone and I started recording because I knew if I didn't, no one would believe me".

Frazier returned to the scene of the murder the following day, where she was seen crying and hugging protesters. She said, "I posted the video last night and it just went viral," and went on to say, "Everybody's asking me how do I feel? I don't know how to feel, 'cause it's so sad, bro. This man was literally right here at 8:00 pm yesterday. I was walking my cousin to the store, and I just see him on the ground and I'm like 'What is going on?'" She ended her remarks by saying, "It is so traumatizing."

In the weeks that followed, Frazier's video helped spark large protests in hundreds of U.S. cities and in dozens of other countries. Although the majority of the protests were peaceful events, rioting and looting took place in some cities including Minneapolis. As many as 15 million to 25 million people may have participated in the protests. Daniel Q. Gillion, a professor at the University of Pennsylvania, called Frazier's video a "powerful catalyst" for the protests, adding "If you aren't moved by the George Floyd video, you have nothing in you".

=== Trial of Derek Chauvin ===
Frazier's video was among the most important pieces of evidence in Chauvin's murder trial. She testified and said "It's been nights I stayed up apologizing and apologizing to George Floyd for not doing more and not physically interacting and not saving his life". She also said that "When I look at George Floyd, I look at my dad, I look at my brothers, I look at my cousins, my uncles, because they're all Black," adding, "I have a Black father. I have a Black brother. I have Black friends," concluding, "I look at how that could have been one of them."

When Chauvin was convicted, analysts agreed that her video and testimony were important to the outcome and had "helped shatter that narrative", referring to the misleading statements initially made by police officials. Frazier celebrated Chauvin's conviction on Facebook and Instagram, writing, "This last hour my heart was beating so fast, I was so anxious, anxiety bussing through the roof. But to know GUILTY ON ALL 3 CHARGES !!! THANK YOU GOD THANK YOU THANK YOU THANK YOU THANK YOU," concluding with another statement "justice has been served".

=== First anniversary ===
On the first anniversary of Floyd's murder, Frazier issued an extended statement on Facebook and Instagram. She described the trauma of seeing Floyd's murder, and how her life and that of her cousin had changed. She criticized the racial profiling and police brutality that too often victimize Black people. She discussed weeks of sleep problems and moving from hotel to hotel to avoid unwanted attention, and the anxiety she felt when she sees a police car. She thanked her mother for her support, and expressed pride that her video had helped bring justice in the Floyd murder case, while expressing regret that she had been powerless to save him. She concluded by speaking directly to Floyd: "I can't express enough how I wish things could have went different, but I want you to know you will always be in my heart. I'll always remember this day because of you. May your soul rest in peace. May you rest in the most beautiful roses."

=== Trial of J. Alexander Kueng, Thomas Lane and Tou Thao ===
In February 2022, Frazier was called to testify at the federal civil rights trial of the three other officers involved in Floyd's murder. Shortly after questioning began, Frazier became upset and was unable to continue, causing the judge to call a short recess. She completed her testimony after the recess.

== Awards and acclaim ==
In December 2020, free speech advocacy group PEN America presented Frazier with its Benenson Courage Award. Director Spike Lee gave the award in a virtual ceremony. The group's CEO Suzanne Nossel said "With nothing more than a cell phone and sheer guts, Darnella changed the course of history in this country, sparking a bold movement demanding an end to systemic anti-Black racism and violence at the hands of police," adding, "Without Darnella's presence of mind and readiness to risk her own safety and wellbeing, we may never have known the truth about George Floyd's murder."

On December 31, 2020, The Daily Dot said, referring to the day of Floyd's murder, "On that day, Frazier became both a citizen journalist and an activist. She also became an American hero, and for that reason, she's the Daily Dot's Internet Person of the Year."

Tim Walz, the governor of Minnesota, thanked Frazier, saying, "Taking that video, I think many folks know, is maybe the only reason that Derek Chauvin will go to prison".

Pete Souza, who served as White House photographer during the Obama administration, wrote that Frazier "demonstrated courage and perseverance in filming what she knew was wrong," adding that "This verdict does not happen without her," and "Thank you Darnella; you have changed our country forever."

Roy Peter Clark, who has served as a Pulitzer Prize juror four times, recommended Frazier for a Pulitzer Prize in May 2021. He wrote, "Darnella Frazier's work lives in that tradition. Her excruciating video had a social and ethical purpose, one that aligns with journalistic values: To give voice to the voiceless, to speak truth to power, to reveal secrets that the corrupt seek to hide, to stand strong in a moment of personal peril, and to document a fleeting reality that is fraught with meaning." On June 11, 2021, the Pulitzer Prize board issued Frazier a special award and citation, for, "courageously reporting the murder of George Floyd, a video that spurred protests against police brutality around the world, highlighting the crucial role of citizens in journalists' quest for truth and justice."

In 2026 her story was profiled in #WhileBlack, a documentary film by Sidney Fussell and Jennifer Holness.

== Personal life ==
Frazier's uncle, Leneal Frazier, was killed when a Minneapolis Police Department squad vehicle crashed into his vehicle during a high-speed car chase in pursuit of a carjacking suspect in the Camden area of Minneapolis at 12:30 a.m on July 6, 2021. Leneal Frazier was uninvolved in the police pursuit.

In 2025, Frazier's sister was arrested as part of an immigration enforcement action that targeted her boyfriend.

== See also ==
- George Floyd protests in Minneapolis–Saint Paul
