= Guns (miniseries) =

- Written by: Jennifer Holness; David Sutherland
- Directed by: David Sutherland
- Starring: Colm Feore; Elisha Cuthbert
- Theme music composer: Mischa Chillak; Kenny Neal Jr.
- Country of origin: Canada
- Original language: English
- No. of episodes: 2

Production
- Producer: Jennifer Holness
- Editor: Jeff Warren
- Running time: 240 minutes

Original release
- Network: CBC
- Release: 2008 – 2008

Guns is a Canadian television miniseries that aired on CBC Television in 2008. Directed by Sudz Sutherland and written by Sutherland and Jennifer Holness, the miniseries explores the issue of gun violence in Canada.

The cast includes Colm Feore, Elisha Cuthbert, Stephen McHattie, K. C. Collins, Shawn Doyle and Lyriq Bent.
