= List of On the Lot films =

The reality series On the Lot revolves around competing directors creating short films each week. The directors and their films are voted on by the viewing audience. The top vote-getters are highlighted and given an encore showing on the program. The bottom vote-getters are eliminated from the competition.

== Semi-finals - "Out of time" ==
In the second episode, the 36 remaining semi-finalists were asked to divide themselves into groups of three and write, shoot, and edit a short film within 24 hours based on the theme "out of time" and each director was judged individually on his or her section of the film.

| Team | Group | Short film title | Cut |
|---|---|---|---|
| #01 | Trever James, Marty Martin, and Jeff Seibenick | Out Of Time 1 | Jeff Seibenick |
| #02 | Jessica Brillhart, Kenny Luby, and Hannah Sink | Vinny's Vault | Hannah Sink |
| #03 | Sam Friedlander, Zach Lipovsky, and Adam Stein | Time Out | None |
| #04 | Will Bigham, Kai Soremekun, and Daniel Tenkman | Sponsored By | Kai Soremekun and Daniel Tenkman |
| #05 | Opie Cooper, Justin Lutsky, and David May | Call Waiting | Opie Cooper |
| #06 | Mateen Kemet, Gil Kruger, and Shira-Lee Shalit | Organized Crime | Gil Kruger |
| #07 | Jarrett Conaway, Tamela D'Amico, and Jason Epperson | Wilted | None |
| #08 | Shawna Baca, Phil Hawkins, and Hillary Skarl | Reverse | Shawna Baca |
| #09 | Hilary Graham, Brent McCorkel, and Carolina Zorilla de San Martin | Random Acts Of Kindness | None |
| #10 | X Dean Lim, Tamika Miller, and Randy Slavin | Ding | Tamika Miller and Randy Slavin |
| #11 | Phil Allocco, Shalini Kantayya, and Jeff Speed | Smile | Phil Allocco and Jeff Speed |
| #12 | James Breese, Andrew Hunt, and Claudia La Bianca | Out Of Time 2 | James Breese |

== Final 18 ==
In this week, contestants were challenged to return to their hometowns and shoot a one-minute comedic short film. This week's films are listed by their placing in the voting, then by surname of the director.

=== Top 3 ===
- Will Bigham: Lucky Penny is a story about a man finding a penny that is not so lucky.
- Jason Epperson: Getta Rhoom follows a nerdy man who gets into trouble when he repeats the phrase "get a room." (This film was criticized by the judges for depicting the nerdy man as a possibly mentally handicapped person.)
- Zach Lipovsky: Danger Zone consists of a single 360-degree shot around a science lab, showing how one mistake leads to another.

=== Continuing contestants ===
- Jessica Brillhart: ...To Screw in a Lightbulb makes literal the internal struggle of a man deciding what to do when a lightbulb goes out.
- Sam Friedlander: Replication Theory shows how people throughout history and around the world replicate a farting noise to avoid being embarrassed.
- Hilary Graham: Bus #1 follows a woman stuck on a bus who needs to go to the bathroom.
- Andrew Hunt: Spaced Out features a police officer who pulls over a spacecraft, piloted by two drunken aliens.
- Trever James: A Golf Story features an overconfident golfer who makes a mistake on the final hole of the World Mini Golf Championship.
- Shalini Kantayya: Love In The Year 2007 follows a woman trying to find love through speed dating and other methods, only to be disappointed with the selection of men.
- Mateen Kemet: Soft follows a man who is trying to prove that he is cool. He is pressured by his friends into robbing an old woman.
- Kenny Luby: Wack Alley Cab follows a cab company whose customers don't last longer than a minute in their cabs.
- Marty Martin: The Big Bad Heist is a trailer for an action film.
- David May: File Size follows an office worker who has trouble with documents that are too large.
- Shira-Lee Shalit: Check Out features a woman in an airport security line partially undressing in a sexual way, while flirting with an attractive man, who she later discovers she was imagining.
- Adam Stein: Dance Man follows the life of a man who communicates only through dance.

=== Bottom 3 ===
- Phil Hawkins: Please Hold shows a woman being robbed. She calls 911, but the call is put on hold.
- Claudia La Bianca: Blind Date features a woman who is on a particularly unsuccessful blind date.
- Carolina Zorilla De San Martin: Deliver Me follows an expecting mother in the delivery room who cannot stop answering her cell phone.

== Final 15 ==
The contestants are reduced from 15 to 12 over three weeks. Each week, five of the fifteen finalists are chosen to show new films, with one of them being cut from the competition the following week.

=== Week two ===
The directors and films shown this week were:

- Sam Friedlander - Broken Pipe Dreams shows how one man must overcome his fear of a toilet to recover an engagement ring.
- Trever James - Teri shows the anxiety of not knowing what to expect with online dating.
- Hilary Graham - The First Time I Met The Finkelsteins shows a "meet the parents"-type story where a son introduces his girlfriend to his outspoken parents.
- Adam Stein - Dough: The Musical is a musical number of a man seeking a wife and a woman seeking employment.
- Shalini Kantayya - Laughing Out Loud: A Comic Journey is a three-minute documentary on a homosexual comedian's journey to being himself.

Carrie Fisher said her favorite film was Broken Pipe Dreams, Garry Marshall said his favorite film was Dough: The Musical, and guest judge Michael Bay said his favorite film was Laughing Out Loud: A Comic Journey. The other ten finalists were surveyed and the majority liked Laughing Out Loud: A Comic Journey the most, and their least favorite was The First Time I Met The Finkelsteins.

=== Week three ===
The directors and films shown this week were:

- Andrew Hunt - Polished follows a janitor who gets revenge on the employees where he works.
- David May - Love at First Shot follows an awkward date and a bumbling cupid attempting to set it right.
- Shira-Lee Shalit - Beeline follows a single mother who is asked a frank question by her son.
- Marty Martin - Dance with the Devil is an action thriller about a man trying to escape the past with his girlfriend.
- Kenny Luby - Edge on the End follows a man dealing with the loss of a loved one.

Carrie Fisher said her favorite film was Polished. Garry Marshall and David Frankel both chose Beeline as their favorite film.

=== Week four ===
The directors and films shown this week were:

- Will Bigham - Glass Eye follows a man trying to retrieve his glass eye.
- Jason Epperson - Blood Born follows a man who discovers that while he's been donating blood for years, his rare blood type has actually been curing the recipients of terminal diseases. The man's troubled past may keep him from sharing his miracle gift.
- Zach Lipovsky - Sunshine Girl follows a little girl who takes the sun out of the sky. As a result, the world goes into a state of panic and emergency. The girl discovers that she will have to put the sun back in the sky to solve the crisis.
- Mateen Kemet - Lost follows a man enjoying the recent success of his career. However, his consumption with work has taken a toll on his relationship with his girlfriend. Several months later, after taking a break from the relationship, the man is surprised by his girlfriend with some shocking news.
- Jessica Brillhart - The Orchard follows a man who starts to see troubling visions and feel pangs of distress, in the process of cutting a tree.

Judges Carrie Fisher, Garry Marshall and Wes Craven all chose Sunshine Girl as their favorite film.

== Final 12 ==
=== Week five ===
The directors and films shown this week were:

- Shalini Kantayya - Dr. In-Law shows a man getting revenge on his father-in-law.
- Adam Stein - Discovering The Wheels follows several cavemen who make an interesting discovery.
- Will Bigham - Nerve Endings follows an intern who experiments on a brain surgery patient.
- Hilary Graham - Under The Gun depicts a unique bank robbery.
- David May - How To Have A Girl shows a couple trying to ensure the gender of their unborn child.
- Zach Lipovsky - Die Hardly Working shows several office workers using their imaginations to deal with the tedium of work.

Judges Carrie Fisher and Mark Waters chose Die Hardly Working as their favorite film, and Garry Marshall chose Under The Gun as his favorite film.

=== Week six ===
The theme this week was horror. The directors and films shown this week were:

- Kenny Luby - The Malibu Myth follows a couple taking a road trip to an area in Malibu where people are mysteriously disappearing.
- Sam Friedlander - Anklebiters shows a young boy discovering a strange new creature.
- Andrew Hunt - Midnight Snack follows a woman who wakes up in the night to make a snack and finds uninvited guests in her house.
- Jason Epperson - Eternal Waters follows a mother, her son, and an intruder in her house.
- Shira-Lee Shalit - Open House follows a man and woman expecting their first child who take a tour of an old house.
- Mateen Kemet - Profile shows a man getting pulled over by the police.

Judge Carrie Fisher chose Midnight Snack as her favorite film, Garry Marshall chose Eternal Waters as his favorite film, and guest judge Eli Roth chose The Malibu Myth as his favorite film.

== Final 10 ==
=== Week seven ===
The theme this week was either in the old west or in the future. The directors and films shown this week were:

- Zach Lipovsky - Time Upon A Once follows a couple who finds something strange about the new neighbors.
- Hilary Graham - The Legend of Donkey-Tail Willie is the story of a man who feels alone in the world.
- Will Bigham - Spaghetti follows a couple who get lost and drive right into the old west.
- Shalini Kantayya - First Sight follows a shallow girl who sees the world differently through a special pair of glasses.
- Adam Stein - Worldly Possession shows a couple who accidentally receive a powerful military tool.

Carrie Fisher chose Worldly Possession as her favorite film, Garry Marshall said Hilary was the most improved filmmaker with her film The Legend of Donkey-Tail Willie, and guest judge Luke Greenfield chose Time Upon A Once as his favorite film (he called it "Twice Upon A Time").

=== Week eight ===
The theme this week was action. The directors and films shown this week were:

- Sam Friedlander - Key Witness follows a criminal pursued by both good guys and bad guys.
- Jason Epperson - Sweet shows a man's hurried journey to get an anniversary gift.
- Andrew Hunt - Zero2Sixty depicts an unusual test drive.
- Kenny Luby - The Losers follows a father who takes his son's place in a skateboard race.
- Mateen Kemet - Catch follows a businessman who pursues a thief.

Carrie Fisher chose Zero2Sixty as her favorite film. Garry Marshall and guest judge Antoine Fuqua chose Sweet as their favorite film.

== Final 6 ==
=== Week nine ===
The theme this week was love. The directors and films shown this week were:

- Zach Lipovsky - The Bonus Feature shows an adventure with an in-car DVD player.
- Adam Stein - Girl Trouble depicts a man introducing his roommate to his new girlfriend.
- Will Bigham - Unplugged follows the romantic adventure of two desk lamps.
- Andrew Hunt - Keep Off Grass follows a superhero couple fighting in a garden.
- Sam Friedlander - American Hoe shows a couple's fight over their wedding invitations.
- Jason Epperson - Old Home Boyz depicts a man's 50th class reunion.

Carrie Fisher chose Girl Trouble as her favorite film. Guest judge Brad Silberling chose Old Home Boyz as his favorite film. Garry Marshall chose Unplugged and Keep Off Grass as his favorite films.

=== Week ten ===
The theme this week was driving. The directors and films shown this week were:

- Adam Stein - Driving Under The Influence depicts a car radio that makes people dance.
- Sam Friedlander - Backseat Driving Test follows a guy who's sick and tired of his mother being a "backseat driver."
- Zach Lipovsky - Bonus Feature Two is a "Part 2" to the story of the movie Zach presented the week before, The Bonus Feature.
- Jason Epperson - The Move involves a difficult and emotional relocation. Starring guest-star Jerry O'Connell.
- Will Bigham - Road Rage 101 features a car that gets back at its angry driver.

Carrie Fisher and guest judge Gary Ross chose Driving Under The Influence as their favorite film, and substitute judge Penny Marshall chose Backseat Driving Test as her favorite film.

=== Week eleven ===
The films in this episode were based on the logline submitted by the winner of the America's Choice Logline Challenge, Kim Saucier from Levant, Maine. The logline was "Man wakes up, rolls out of bed one morning to find himself in a dress, and he's got no memory at all of how he got into the frock." The directors and films shown this week were:

- Will Bigham - The Yes Men is about a boss whose suit is misplaced by a dry cleaner.
- Sam Friedlander - Dress for Success is about an abusive boss and some women employees who get revenge.
- Adam Stein - Army Guy depicts a soldier who wakes up inside a house, surrounded by odd twins who want to marry him.
- Jason Epperson - Oh, Boy. involves a man forced to wear a dress and dance or a bomb will detonate.

Carrie Fisher, Garry Marshall and guest judge F. Gary Gray all chose Army Guy as their favorite film.
