= Shoot the Messenger (TV series) =

- Created by: Sudz Sutherland; Jennifer Holness
- Starring: Elyse Levesque; Lyriq Bent; Alex Kingston; Lucas Bryant
- Opening theme: "Truth" by Jully Black
- Country of origin: Canada
- No. of episodes: 8

Production
- Running time: 60 minutes
- Production companies: Hungry Eyes Film and Television

Original release
- Network: CBC Television
- Release: October 10 – December 5, 2016

Shoot the Messenger is a Canadian political and crime drama television series that aired on CBC Television from October 10, 2016 to December 5, 2016. The series was not renewed for a second season.

Produced by Hungry Eyes Film and Television, the series stars Elyse Levesque as Daisy Channing, a young Toronto journalist who witnesses an apparent gang-related murder and is drawn into a criminal underworld with ties to the city's political and business elite. The series also stars Alex Kingston as her editor Mary Fowler, Lucas Bryant as her coworker Simon Olendski, and Lyriq Bent as police homicide detective Kevin Lutz. Supporting cast members include Hannah Anderson, Ari Cohen, Edie Inksetter, Al Sapienza and Nicholas Campbell, as well as guest appearances by Ed Robertson, Jamaal Magloire and Rick Fox.

Producer and creator Sudz Sutherland acknowledged that the series was indirectly inspired by the Rob Ford video scandal of 2013, but stated that the series is not meant to be interpreted as being about Ford in any literal way.

== Cast ==
- Elyse Levesque as Daisy Channing, a reporter for The Gazette
- Lucas Bryant as Simon Olendski, Daisy's co-worker at The Gazette
- Lyriq Bent as Kevin Lutz, a Metro Police homicide detective
- Alex Kingston as Mary Foster, the editor of The Gazette
- Hannah Anderson as Chloe Channing, Daisy's sister and Sam Charles' executive assistant
- Ari Cohen as Sam Charles, the Attorney General of Ontario
- Edie Inksetter as Jordana Ortiz, homicide detective and Frank's partner
- Maurice Dean Wint as Phil Hardcastle, Chief of Staff to the Attorney General
- Patrick Kwok-Choon as Roger Deacon, another reporter for The Gazette

== Episodes ==
No.	Title	Directed by	Written by	Original release date	Canada viewers (millions)
1	"Beginner's Luck"	Sudz Sutherland	Jennifer Holness & Sudz Sutherland	October 10, 2016	N/A
2	"There Will Be Blood"	Sudz Sutherland	Jennifer Holness & Sudz Sutherland	October 17, 2016	N/A
3	"I Shall Be Released"	Sudz Sutherland	Jennifer Holness & Sudz Sutherland	October 24, 2016	N/A
4	"Careful What You Pray For"	Sudz Sutherland	Jennifer Holness & Sudz Sutherland	October 31, 2016	N/A
5	"Strange Bedfellows"	Sudz Sutherland	Jennifer Holness & Sudz Sutherland	November 14, 2016	N/A
6	"News Travels Fast"	Sudz Sutherland	Jennifer Holness & Sudz Sutherland	November 21, 2016	N/A
7	"Darkness Comes to Light"	Sudz Sutherland	Jennifer Holness & Sudz Sutherland	November 28, 2016	N/A
8	"Full Circle"	Sudz Sutherland	Jennifer Holness & Sudz Sutherland	December 5, 2016	N/A
