= Killing of Leneal Frazier =

Police homicide in Minnesota

- Part of police brutality in the United States and racism against African Americans
- The intersection of Lyndale Avenue and 41st Avenue North where Frazier was killed.
- Location: 45.029361°N 93.288108°W; Minneapolis, Minnesota, U.S.
- Date: July 6, 2021; 5 years ago c. 12:31 a.m. CDT
- Attack type: Car crash, vehicular homicide, police killing
- Deaths: 1
- Injuries: 2
- Victim: Leneal Frazier
- Perpetrator: Brian Cummings
- Motive: Botched police vehicle pursuit
- Charges: Brian Cummings: Second-degree manslaughter (dropped); James Jones-Drain: Vehicular theft (2 counts), fleeing police resulting in death (all dropped)
- Verdict: Brian Cummings: Pleaded guilty
- Convictions: Vehicular homicide
- Sentence: 9 months in prison

Leneal Frazier was a 40-year-old African American man who was killed in Minneapolis at about 12:30 a.m. on July 6, 2021, in a car crash with officer Brian Cummings of the Minneapolis Police Department. That night, Cummings was pursuing suspected thieves in a vehicle at a high rate of speed through a residential neighborhood and ran a red light when he unintentionally struck Frazier's vehicle at a street intersection. Frazier, who was an innocent bystander and not involved in the police chase, died at the scene. Cummings faced criminal charges for operating his police vehicle negligently and causing Frazier's death. In mid 2023, he pleaded guilty to the criminal charge of vehicular homicide and received a nine-month prison sentence.

Leneal Frazier was the uncle of Darnella Frazier, a bystander who filmed the police murder of George Floyd in 2020 that led to worldwide protests. Leneal Frazier's death occurred during a period of prolonged, local unrest over racial injustice and police brutality and when Minneapolis was experiencing a surge in crimes such as carjackings and thefts, which led to more intensive law enforcement actions. An attorney for Leneal Frazier's family argued that his death was the result of systemic racism due to the aggressive tactics police use in Black communities. Frazier's death was protested.

The theft suspects were later apprehended and charged with several criminal counts, including fleeing police resulting in death. Prosecutors later dropped some of the criminal charges. The city settled a $475,000 wrongful death lawsuit with Frazier’s family.

== Background ==
=== People involved ===
Leneal (sometimes reported as Laneal) Lamont Frazier was a resident of Saint Paul, Minnesota. He had six children ranging from age 22 to 6-months old. He also had a grandchild. Frazier was the uncle of Darnella Frazier, whose video of Derek Chauvin kneeling on the neck of George Floyd while he struggled to breathe and died on May 25, 2020, was a catalyst for wide-reaching protests and a national reckoning on structural racism and police brutality.

Brian Cummings was a 37-year-old officer with the Minneapolis Police Department. At the time of the fatal car crash, he had 14 years of experience on the police force. Cummings had been involved in 12 vehicle chases in the first half of 2021, a disproportionate number. One month before the fatal pursuit that led to Frazier's death, Cummings conducted a chase on North Second Street at speeds of 102 miles per hour (164 km/h) for which he did not receive negative feedback from his supervisors.

=== Police pursuits ===
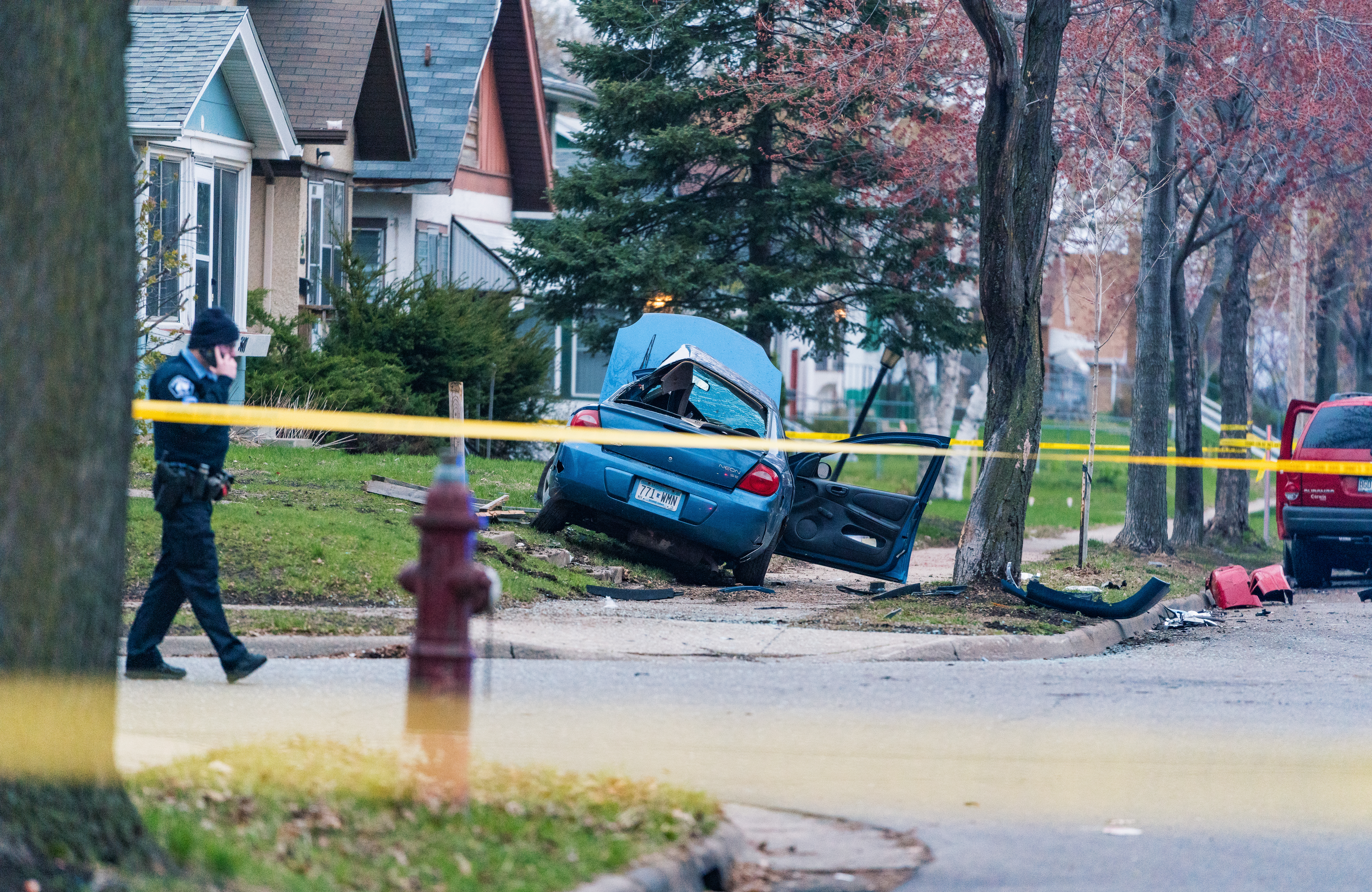
Aftermath of a fatal police chase in Minneapolis, May 1, 2019.

A 2016 report by the USA Today newspaper found African Americans were three times more likely than other Americans to be killed in police chases, as both innocent bystanders and as suspects. A 2017 report by the United States Department of Justice’s Bureau of Justice Statistics found that 7,000 deaths between 1996 and 2015 were the result of police pursuits, including 72 in Minnesota. In Hennepin County, Minnesota, the jurisdiction that includes the City of Minneapolis, police pursuits between 2013 and 2020 had resulted in 40 fatalities, according to local court records.

In 2019, as the City of Minneapolis experienced in increase in the number of police chase incidents, the Minneapolis Police Department updated its pursuit policy to establish that officers must not pursue or discontinue a pursuit if it posed an unreasonable risk. The policy said that officers could only give chase if they believed the suspect committed or was about to commit “a serious and violent felony or gross misdemeanor".

In the aftermath of the initial George Floyd protests in mid 2020, Minneapolis experienced an increase in violent crimes, including carjackings, leading to more intensive law enforcement efforts to apprehend criminal suspects despite a shortage of police officers.

== Crash ==
Just after midnight on July 6, 2021, Leneal Frazier was in his Jeep vehicle in Minneapolis and was heading back to his home in nearby Saint Paul. Minneapolis police officer Brian Cummings was in his marked squad car in the Camden area of North Minneapolis. Cummings spotted a Kia Sportage that matched the description of a vehicle that had been used in several business thefts. Cummings activated the squad car's siren and lights and attempted to pull the Kia Sportage over. The driver of the Kia Sportage sped off and Cummings followed in pursuit.

Cummings pursued the Kia heading northward on Lyndale Avenue North with his lights and siren activated. The two vehicles headed through several stop signs and stop lights in a car chase that lasted for about 20 city blocks. The posted speed limit for the streetway was 25 miles per hour (40 km/h), but the two vehicles were travelling at speeds approaching 100 miles per hour (160 km/h).

Frazier, who was uninvolved in the police pursuit, was heading westbound on 41st Avenue. At about 12:30 a.m., he had a green light and proceeded into the street intersection at Lyndale Avenue North. The Kia travelling northbound narrowly passed by the front of Frazier's vehicle. Cummings, who also ran the red light in pursuit of the Kia, approached the intersection at about 90 miles per hour (140 km/h) and collided with Frazier's Jeep while the squad car was still travelling at 78 miles per hour (126 km/h). After crashing into Frazier's vehicle, the police vehicle hit another uninvolved vehicle, a passenger van, that was travelling south on Lyndale Avenue North. The momentum caused the vehicles to crash into a Metro bus shelter near a Clark gas station. The crash was captured on surveillance video.

Frazier died at the scene. Cummings sustained serious, but non-life-threatening injuries and was taken to a hospital. The driver of the van also sustained injuries. The theft suspect who was driving the Kia was not involved in the crash and remained at large afterwards.

== Reaction ==
Minneapolis mayor Jacob Frey described the crash as “horrific tragedy” and said the police department would review its pursuit policy. Police spokesman John Elder, however, said in response that officer was pursuing an armed robbery suspect and that the situation fit the department's criteria to initiate a pursuit. The Minneapolis Police Department updated its policy and procedural manual and listed robbery among the 11 different crimes officers could initiate pursuit if necessary.

Darnella Frazier questioned why police had conducted a high-speed chase on a residential street, and also wrote, "Another black man lost his life in the hands of the police!...Minneapolis police has cost my whole family a big loss...today has been a day full of heartbreak and sadness."

Frazier family attorney Jeff Storms said, “When someone says this isn't about race, that's ignoring the various systematic race issues that are at play here — how law enforcement polices Black communities, the aggression with which law enforcement polices in particular our Black brothers and sisters.”

Minneapolis NAACP president Angela Rose Myers said, “It doesn't matter if words change if the policy and people's practice is not actually changed.”

Several vigils were held for Frazier that also called for justice over his death. On July 7, 2021, two days after the fatal car crash, a group of approximately 40 people who were mourning the death of Frazier blocked vehicular traffic to the street intersection where he was killed. Late that night, Minneapolis police brought in road closure signs to allow the crowd to continue the gathering safely. A funeral was held for Leneal Frazier on July 19, 2021, at the Shiloh Temple International Ministries in Minneapolis. Relatives of George Floyd, who was murdered by a Minneapolis police officer in 2020, were in attendance.

== Investigation and legal proceedings ==
=== Brian Cummings ===
Cummings was placed on paid administrative leave after the crash. The Minnesota State Patrol investigated the incident and presented its findings to the Hennepin County Attorney's office, which determined that the injuries Frazier sustained as a result of the crash were the cause of his death. On October 22, 2021, the office of county attorney Michael Freeman charged Cummings with second-degree manslaughter and criminal vehicular homicide. In the criminal compliant, prosecutors said Cummings operated his vehicle negligently when chase speeds approached 100 miles per hour (160 km/h) in a residential neighborhood. They cited Minneapolis police policy that said that officers should not pursue suspects if it poses an "unreasonable risk to the officer, the public or passengers of the vehicle". Cummings' employment with the police department ended the day he was charged, but it was unclear in media sources if he was fired or if he left the force voluntarily.

In order to avoid trial, Cummings pleaded guilty on April 27, 2023, to criminal vehicular homicide, the lesser of the two charges, and prosecutors agreed to drop the charge of second-degree manslaughter. Frazier's family expressed their desire to the court that Cummings receive jail time. Cummings was sentenced on July 12, 2023, to nine months in a minimal security prison with eligibility for parole after three months. At his sentencing hearing, Cummings apologized to the Frazier family.

Cummings' conviction was the first time a Minnesota police officer had pleaded guilty to a homicide offense without having been convicted previously or having a promise of a concurrent sentence in an outside jurisdiction. Hennepin County Attorney Mary Moriarty, who assumed office after Freeman's departure at the beginning of 2023, said about the conclusion of the criminal case, “Today's sentencing sends an important message that every person in our county will be held accountable for their actions when they break the law.”

=== Theft suspects ===
The suspects Cummings was pursuing were not involved in the July 6, 2021, crash and fled the scene. In September 2022, one of the suspects was publicly identified and charged with two felony counts of vehicle theft, one charge of fleeing police resulting in death, and four counts of robbery. The suspect was apprehended in January 2023 and held at a Hennepin County jail on a $1 million bond. In charging documents, prosecutors alleged that the suspect, a 20-year-old man, had stolen the Kia vehicle from a woman at the Target store on East Lake Street three days before the fatal crash and that he was responsible for a string of four business robberies leading up to the police chase. Days before the trial was to begin, prosecutors with Hennepin County Attorney's Office dismissed the vehicle theft and fleeing police charges, but the suspect received a five-year prison sentence related to other illegal gun possession and robbery charges. The suspect's accomplice faced charges for vehicle theft and robbery, but had a plea deal rejected by a Hennepin County judge in late 2023.

=== Civil suit ===
The Frazier family sought legal representation from attorneys Jeff Storms and Benjamin Crump. Storms said they would file a civil suit, but hoped the city would settle out of court, which it did in 2025 when the city council approved a $475,000 settlement with Frazier’s family.

== See also ==
- List of killings by law enforcement officers in Minnesota
- 2020–2023 Minneapolis–Saint Paul racial unrest
