= Cheryl Thompson =

Canadian academic

Academic work
- Institutions: Toronto Metropolitan University
- Website: www.drcherylthompson.com

Cheryl Thompson is a Black Canadian academic known for studying Black media studies, performance, archives and collections in Canada. She is an associate professor at Toronto Metropolitan University (formerly Ryerson University) in the school of performance.

Thompson completed a PhD in communication studies at McGill University under the supervision of Charmaine Nelson and Will Straw. Her first book, Beauty in a Box: Detangling the Roots of Canada's Black Beauty Culture, published in 2019 by Wilfrid Laurier Press, was based on her PhD dissertation. It examined the relationship of Black women's hair with Canadian immigration, politics, and societal norms. In a 2020 interview, she explained that she wanted to “Raise awareness that black women don't experience the same things other women do, and it's also based on the unique history that we have living in the Western world."

Thompson joined Toronto Metropolitan's Creative School in 2018. She is currently pursuing a research project "Newspapers, Minstrelsy and Black Performance at the Theatre: Mapping the Spaces of Nation-Building in Toronto, 1870s to 1930s" as part of a SSHRC Insight Development Grant (2019–21). Prior to her appointment at the school she was a Banting Postdoctoral Fellow from 2016 to 2018 with the Centre for Theatre, Drama and Performance Studies at the University of Toronto Faculty of Arts and Science and the Department of English and Drama at the University of Toronto Mississauga.

Thompson's second book Uncle: Race, Nostalgia and the Politics of Race, which used Uncle Tom as backdrop for understanding the production of racial tropes, is set to be published 2021 by Coach House Books. The work aims to underscore the power and impact of stereotypes over time.

In 2023, Thompson unveiled a new archival project, Mapping Ontario's Black Archives (MOBA), "a digital platform for open access to Black archival collections in Ontario."

== Select publications ==
=== Articles ===
- Thompson, Cheryl (2 September 2019). "Uncle Tom's Cabin Historic Site and creolization: the material and visual culture of archival memory". African and Black Diaspora. 12 (3): 304–319. doi:10.1080/17528631.2019.1611325. S2CID 197697547.
- Thompson, Cheryl (19 September 2019). "Opinion - Why Trudeau's 'brownface' photo is not shocking". thestar.com. Archived from the original on 2019-09-20.
- Thompson, Cheryl (3 September 2015). "Neoliberalism, Soul Food, and the Weight of Black Women". Feminist Media Studies. 15 (5): 794–812. doi:10.1080/14680777.2014.1003390. S2CID 143952348.

=== Books ===
- Thompson, Cheryl (April 2019). Beauty in a box : detangling the roots of Canada's black beauty culture. Waterloo, Ontario. ISBN 9781771123587.
- Thompson, Cheryl (February 2021). Uncle : race, nostalgia, and the politics of loyalty. Toronto: Coach House Books. ISBN 9781552454107.
