= A Very Merry Daughter of the Bride =

2008 Canadian television film

- Genre: Comedy, Drama, Romance
- Written by: Scott Eastlick; Leslie Hope
- Directed by: Leslie Hope
- Starring: Joanna García; Helen Shaver; Luke Perry
- Theme music composer: Zack Ryan
- Country of origin: Canada
- Original language: English

Production
- Producers: Michael Frislev; Chad Oakes
- Cinematography: Adam Kane
- Editor: Bridget Durnford
- Running time: 89 minutes

Original release
- Network: Lifetime
- Release: December 15, 2008

A Very Merry Daughter of the Bride is a 2008 television film directed by Leslie Hope and starring Joanna García and Luke Perry. The film originally aired in Canada on December 15, 2008, and in the United States on December 20, 2008 on Lifetime. The screenplay concerns wedding planner Roxanne (García), who tries to foil her mother's plans to marry a man she just met by sabotaging their Christmas wedding. But she soon finds herself falling in love just as quickly as her mother did.

== Plot ==
Wedding planner Rose goes on a trip to France by herself for three days and leaves her daughter Roxanne in charge of the wedding business. While Rose is in Paris, Roxanne reconnects with her former fiance from six years ago, Dylan, who had abruptly called off the wedding and vanished. Dylan asks to catch up with Roxanne, but she refuses since her mother is due to arrive home the same day. Roxanne gets a surprise when she meets her mother's new fiancé Jack, who proposed to Rose after knowing her for only two days. Jealous of her mother's success, Roxanne comes up with a plan to destroy her mother's marriage, with the help of Charlie, Jack's son from a previous marriage.

Roxanne convinces the couple to hold off the wedding so that she has enough time to make sure everything that can go wrong does. Roxanne and Charlie first attempt to make Jack late to his own rehearsal dinner by telling him about a wine auction. Jack goes to the wine auction to find the wine that he and Rose and had enjoyed in Paris. Jack buys the entire case and brings it to Rose. Seeing this, Roxanne realizes that Jack truly loves her mother and she abandons her plan to sabotage the wedding. Charlie does not see things the same way. He makes plans to open up a bridal store to put Roxanne and Rose's company out of business. Roxanne discovers his plan and goes with the news to her mother, who calls off the wedding.

On Christmas Day, Roxanne forces her mother to come with her to the Christmas show. Jack shows up with a horse and carriage to sweep Rose off her feet. With the help of Roxanne, Jack convinces Rose to accept his wedding proposal for a second time. Roxanne speaks to Jack and learns he had no knowledge of the opening of the bridal store.

At Jack and Rose's wedding, Dylan asks Roxanne for a dance and proposes marriage. Roxanne accepts.

== Cast ==
Actor/Actress	Role
Luke Perry	Charlie
Joanna Garcia	Roxanne
Helen Shaver	Rose
Jason Priestly	William
Kenneth Welsh	Jack
Lucas Bryant	Dylan
Chantel Perron	Tish
Lorette Clow	Liz Sandor

== Setting ==
The film takes place during the holiday season around the time of Christmas. This specific holiday had been very important for Roxanne as she spent it with her mother, yet Rose and Jack planned to get married on the same day. Roxanne while she disapproved of her mothers wedding to Jack, was furthered in sabotaging their wedding when she realizes that her mother was not only marrying a stranger but during a time where family was seen as sacred and meant to celebrate together. Hence, this does not include bringing strangers over for Christmas just as Rose had done on her way back from France. While it is not specified where the film takes place, Roxanne and Rose lived in a smaller city in the United States of America.

== Production ==
A Very Merry Daughter of the Bride was filmed in Calgary, Alberta, Canada. The total production cost of the film is estimated at 1,300,000 CDN. While being filmed in Calgary, Perry was interviewed by the Ottawa Citizen and stated "For Perry, a one-time starving actor who supported himself by laying asphalt and working in a doorknob factory, there was just no room for ego."
