= Sudz Sutherland =

Canadian film director

David Sutherland
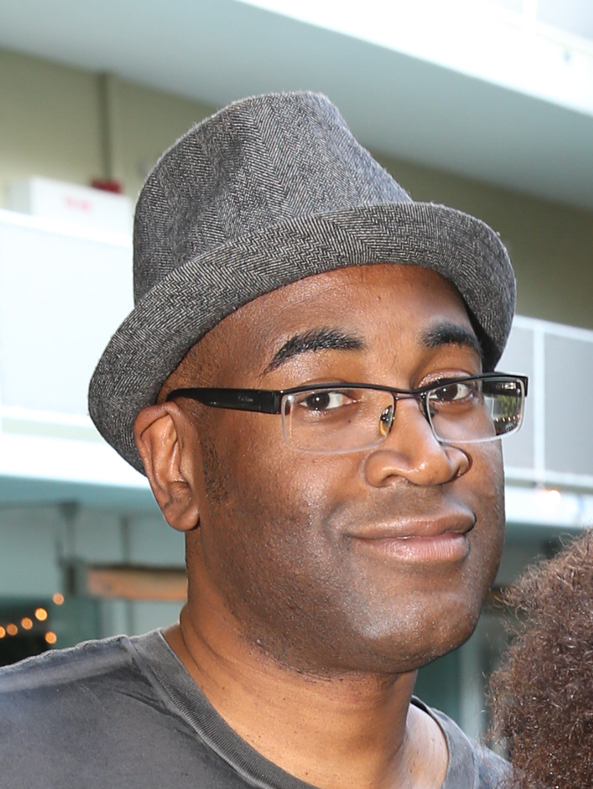
- Sutherland at an event for the Canadian Film Centre in 2015
- Occupations: Film director and screenwriter
- Known for: Doomstown; Love, Sex and Eating the Bones; Guns

David "Sudz" Sutherland is a Canadian film director and screenwriter. His credits include the films Doomstown, Love, Sex and Eating the Bones, Guns, Speakers for the Dead and Home Again, as well as episodes of Drop the Beat, Da Kink in My Hair, Degrassi: The Next Generation, Wild Roses, Jozi-H, Reign, She's the Mayor, Designated Survivor, Shoot the Messenger, Murdoch Mysteries, Frankie Drake Mysteries, Batwoman and Superman & Lois.

He is married to screenwriter and producer Jennifer Holness, his partner in Hungry Eyes Film & Television.

== Movies ==
Year	Work	Director	Writer	Producer
1998	I'm a Big Girl	Yes	Yes	No
1998	Win/Loss/Tie	Yes	Yes	Yes
1999	My Father's Hands	Yes	Yes	No
2000	Speakers for the Dead	Yes	No	No
2003	Love, Sex and Eating the Bones	Yes	Yes	No
2006	Doomstown	Yes	Yes	No
2008	Toronto Stories: Windows Segment	Yes	Yes	No
2012	Home Again	Yes	Yes	Yes
2012	The Phantoms	Yes	No	No

== Television ==
Year	Work	Director	Writer	Producer
2004	My Brand New Life (Music for Whose Ears)	Yes	No	No
2005–2007	Degrassi: The Next Generation: Season 4 Episode 17: "Queen of Hearts"; Season 4 Episode 18: "Modern Love"; Season 6 Episode 12: "The Bitterest Pill"; Season 6 Episode 13: "If You Leave"	Yes	No	No
2007	'Da Kink in My Hair: Season 1 Episode 1: "Rules are Made"; Season 1 Episode 5: "Love Can't Wrap Up in a Paper"; Season 1 Episode 6: "Every Hoe Have Him Stick"; Season 2 Episode 9: "Computer Love"	Yes	Yes	No
2008	Guns	Yes	Yes	No
2008–2009	Heartland: Season 2 Episode 9: "Showdown!"; Season 2 Episode 10: "True Enough"	Yes	No	No
2009	Wild Roses: Season 1 Episode 12: "Time and Chance"; Season 1 Episode 13: "First and Last"	Yes	No	No
2011	She's the Mayor: Season 1 Episode 1: "She's the Mayor?"; Season 1 Episode 3: "The Empress' New Clothes"; Season 1 Episode 4: "Proclamation"; Season 1 Episode 7: "An Officer and a Mayor"; Season 1 Episode 12: "Strange Bedfellows"; Season 1 Episode 13: "The Return of Frank Crumb"	Yes	Yes	No
2013	Cracked: Season 2 Episode 7: "Hideaway"	Yes	No	No
2010–2014	Murdoch Mysteries: Season 3 Episode 7: "Blood and Circuses"; Season 3 Episode 9: "Love and Human Remains"; Season 7 Episode 13: "The Murdoch Sting"; Season 7 Episode 15: "The Spy Who Came Up to the Cold"; Season 8 Episode 4: "Holy Matrimony, Murdoch!"; Season 8 Episode 5: "Murdoch Takes Manhattan"	Yes	No	No
2014–2015	Reign: Season 1 Episode 20: "Higher Ground"; Season 2 Episode 4: "The Lamb and the Slaughter"; Season 2 Episode 17: "Tempting Fate"	Yes	No	No
2014–2015	Beauty & the Beast: Season 2 Episode 11: "Held Hostage"; Season 3 Episode 11: "Unbreakable"	Yes	No	No
2015	Haven: Season 5 Episode 21: "Close to Home"; Season 5 Episode 22: "A Matter of Time"	Yes	No	No
2016	Shoot the Messenger	Yes	Yes	Yes
2017–2018	Frankie Drake Mysteries: Season 1 Episode 3: "Healing Hands"; Season 1 Episode 5: "Out of Focus"; Season 2 Episode 5: "Dressed to Kill"; Season 2 Episode 6: "Extra Innings"	Yes	No	No
2017–2019	Private Eyes: Season 2 Episode 6: "The P.I. Code"; Season 2 Episode 16: "Look Who's Stalking"; Season 3 Episode 10: "Tex Therapy"; Season 3 Episode 11: "Aye, Aye, Tonya"	Yes	No	No
2018	In Contempt: Season 1 Episode 3: "Confessions"; Season 1 Episode 4: "The Rules of Engagement"; Season 1 Episode 9: "BLM, Part One"; Season 1 Episode 10: "BLM, Part Two"	Yes	No	No
2019	Blindspot: Season 4 Episode 18: "'Ohana"	Yes	No	No
2019	Designated Survivor: Season 3 Episode 7: "#identity/crisis"; Season 3 Episode 8: "#scaredsh*tless"	Yes	No	No
2019	Carter: Season 2 Episode 9: "Harley Doesn't Get His Man"; Season 2 Episode 10: "Harley Takes a Bow"	Yes	No	No
2020	Utopia Falls: Season 1 Episode 3: "99 Problems"; Season 1 Episode 4: "Run This Town"	Yes	No	No
2020	Batwoman: Season 1 Episode 16: "Through the Looking Glass"	Yes	No	No
2020	For the Record: Season 1 Episode 3: "Dinner Music"; Season 1 Episode 4: "Climax"	Yes	No	No
2020–2021	The Flash: Season 6 Episode 11: "Love is a Battlefield"; Season 7 Episode 8: "The People V. Killer Frost"	Yes	No	No
2021	Ginny & Georgia: Season 1 Episode 5: "Boo, B*tch"; Season 1 Episode 6: "I'm Triggered"	Yes	No	No
2021	Supergirl: Season 6 Episode 3: "Phantom Menaces"	Yes	No	No
2021	Kung Fu: Season 1 Episode 12: "Sacrifice"	Yes	No	No
2021–2022	Legends of Tomorrow: Season 6 Episode 4: "Bay of Squids"; Season 7 Episode 12: "Too Legit to Quit"	Yes	No	No
2021–2024	Superman & Lois: Season 1 Episode 6: "Broken Trust"; Season 2 Episode 8: "Into Oblivion"; Season 3 Episode 12: "Injustice"; Season 4 Episode 2: "A World Without"	Yes	No	No
2022	BLK, An Origin Story: Season 1 Episode 2: "John "Daddy" Hall"; Season 1 Episode 3: "Hogan's Alley"	Yes	Yes	Yes
2022	FBI: Most Wanted: Season 4 Episode 6: "Patent Pending"	Yes	No	No
2023	All American: Season 5 Episode 19: "Sabotage"	Yes	No	No
2023	Pretty Hard Cases: Season 3, Episode 8: "Badge Bitch Party"	Yes	No	No
2024	Found: Season 2 Episode 7: "Missing While Hated"	Yes	No	No
2024–2025	Alert: Missing Persons Unit: Season 2 Episode 8: "Alexi"; Season 3 Episode 8: "Carmen"	Yes	No	No
2024–2025	Brilliant Minds: Season 1 Episode 11: "The Other Woman"; Season 2 Episode 4: "Lady Liberty"	Yes	No	No
2024-2026	Law & Order Toronto: Criminal Intent: Season 1 Episode 5: "Bleeding Heart"; Season 2 Episode 4: "Hoggs Hollow"; Season 2 Episode 7: "The Man in the Stadium"; Season 3 Episode 1: "Skin Deep"	Yes	No	No
2026	Boston Blue: Season 1 Episode 11: "Family Secrets"; Season 1 Episode 12: "St. Patrick's Day"	Yes	No	No

== Awards and nominations ==
Year	Work	Award	Result
2000	My Father's Hands	Acapulco Black Film Festival's Short Film Award	Won
2000	Drop the Beat	Gemini Awards Best Writing in a Dramatic Series Award	Nominated
2003	Love, Sex and Eating the Bones	Toronto International Film Festival Best Canadian First Feature Film Award (shared with Jennifer Holness)	Won
2004	Love, Sex and Eating the Bones	Victoria Independent Film & Video Festival Best Canadian Feature Award (shared with Jennifer Holness)	Won
2004	Love, Sex and Eating the Bones	American Black Film Festival Best Film Award (shared with Jennifer Holness)	Won
2004	Love, Sex and Eating the Bones	Los Angeles Pan African Film Festival Best Feature Award (shared with Jennifer Holness)	Won
2004	Love, Sex and Eating the Bones	Los Angeles Pan African Film Festival Audience Award (shared with Jennifer Holness)	Won
2004	Love, Sex and Eating the Bones	San Francisco Black Film Festival Jury Award, Festival Prize	Nominated
2005	Love, Sex and Eating the Bones	Genie Awards Best Achievement in Direction Award	Nominated
2005	Love, Sex and Eating the Bones	Genie Awards Best Screenplay, Original	Nominated
2007	Doomstown	Gemini Awards Best Direction in a Dramatic Program or Miniseries Award	Won
2007	Doomstown	Gemini Awards Best Writing in a Dramatic Program or Miniseries Award	Nominated
2008	Guns	Writer's Guild of Canada's WGC Award (shared with Jennifer Holness)	Nominated
2008	Guns	Director's Guild of Canada's DGC Team Award, Television Movie/Minsiseries	Nominated
2010	Guns	Gemini Awards Best Direction in a Dramatic Program or Miniseries Award	Won
2010	Guns	Gemini Awards Best Writing in a Dramatic Program or Miniseries Award (shared with Jennifer Holness)	Won
2012	Home Again	Whistler Film Festival Phillip Borsos Award for Best Canadian Film (shared with Jennifer Holness)	Nominated
2013	Home Again	Director's Guild of Canada Direction – Feature Film Award	Nominated
2013	Home Again	Los Angeles Pan African Film Festival Favourite Feature Film Audience Award (shared with Jennifer Holness)	Won
2013	Home Again	Los Angeles Pan African Film Festival Best Narrative Feature (shared with Jennifer Holness)	Nominated
2013	The Phantoms	Director's Guild of Canada Direction – Television Movie/Miniseries Award	Nominated
2014	The Phantoms	Canadian Screen Awards Best Direction in a Dramatic Program or Miniseries Award	Won
2014	The Phantoms	International Emmy Awards, Kids: TV Movie/Mini-Series (shared with Timothy M. Hogan, Rick LeGuerrier and Andrew Wreggitt	Won
2020	Stateless	Boston Latino Film Festival's Audience Award (shared with Jennifer Holness, Michèle Stephenson, Joe Brewster and Lea Marin)	Won
2021	Stateless	Canadian Screen Awards Ted Rogers Best Feature Length Documentary Award (shared with Jennifer Holness, Michèle Stephenson, Joe Brewster and Lea Marin)	Nominated
2022	For the Record, for "Climax"	Canadian Screen Awards Best Direction, Web Program or Series Award	Nominated
