= Jennifer Holness =

TV and film producer and screenwriter

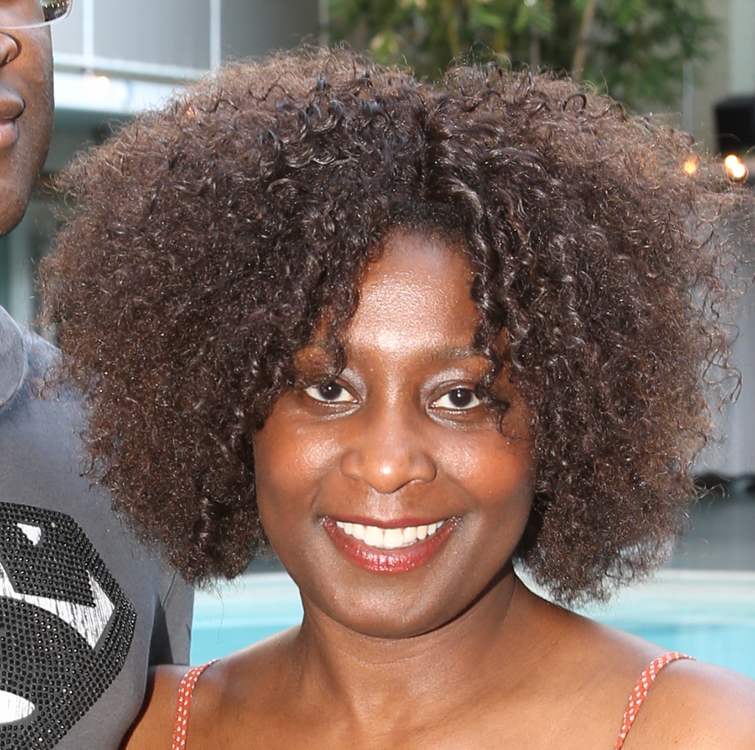
- Jennifer Holness at a CFC event in L.A.
- Occupations: Film/TV Director, Producer and Screenwriter
- Known for: Subjects of Desire; Love, Sex and Eating the Bones; Guns; She's the Mayor

Jennifer Holness is a Jamaican-born Canadian film and television director, producer and screenwriter. She operates Hungry Eyes Media Inc., along with her business partner and husband Sudz Sutherland. Her production and writing credits include the film Subjects of Desire, Love, Sex and Eating the Bones and the television series Guns, She's the Mayor and Shoot the Messenger.

Holness also directed the documentary film Speakers for the Dead, and produced Catherine Annau's documentary film Brick by Brick.

== Biography ==
Jennifer Holness was born in 1969 in Montego Bay, Jamaica. She moved to Toronto, Canada, at a young age with her mother. She attended York University, where she studied political science. This is also where she met her husband David "Sudz" Sutherland. The two were married after finishing their degrees at York University and have three daughters.

== Career ==
Holness has mentioned that growing up in a housing project helped shape her view of the city and how she crafts her work. The aim of her work has been a steady understanding of the stories that most people do not want to direct; touching subjects about gun violence, homophobia and deportation of immigrants in the city of Toronto. Holness' professional career started with a documentary in which she co-directed, Speakers for the Dead (2000) with her husband, Sutherland. Following the success from Love, Sex And Eating the Bones, Holness produced and co-wrote a miniseries for CBC titled Guns (2009). She then went on to produce a documentary, Badge of Pride (2010), which looked at the struggles that gay police officers faced in the force. Holness went on to produce and co-write another feature film titled Home Again (2012), in which follows Jamaican deportees from Canada. Holness mentions that she obtained the inspiration for this film from a classmate in high school who was deported back to Jamaica- and killed in a shooting. It was in an attempt to challenge the bill C-43 which stated that immigrants with criminal records could be deported back to native countries. Her largest work to date with husband David Sutherland with a production value of over 4 million.

She produced and co-wrote the TV crime drama, Shoot the Messenger (2016), a drama that follows a journalist who gets tied up with various third-parties (such as gangs and politicians) while she uncovers her first murder case. The idea was loosely based on the controversies of former Toronto mayor Rob Ford.

In 2021, her documentary film Subjects of Desire (2021) premiered at SXSW competing in the Documentary Feature Competition.

She was named the recipient of the Don Haig Award at the 2026 Hot Docs Canadian International Documentary Festival. In the same year she premiered #WhileBlack, a documentary film codirected with Sidney Fussell.

== Awards and nominations ==
Year	Awards and Nominations
2000	Best Documentary Film (Speakers for the Dead), Black Film and Video Network's Reel Black Award HBO Award for Best Short Film (My Father’s Hands), Acapulco International Black Film Festival Best Drama (My Father’s Hands), Yorkton Film Festival, Golden Sheaf Award Best Director (My Father’s Hands), Yorkton Film Festival, Golden Sheaf Award
2001	Prix Chantal Lapaire (Speakers for the Dead), Vues D’Afrique Film Festival
2003	Best Canadian First Feature Film (Love, Sex, and Eating the Bones), Toronto International Film Festival
2004	Audience Award, Best Feature Film (Love, Sex, and Eating the Bones), American Black Film Festival Best Feature (Love, Sex, and Eating the Bones), Los Angeles Pan African Film Festival Audience Award (Love, Sex, and Eating the Bones), Los Angeles Pan African Film Festival Best Canadian Feature (Love, Sex, and Eating the Bones), Victoria Independent Film + Video Festival
2010	Best Writing (Guns), Canadian Gemini Award
2011	Excellence in Media – Video (Brick by Brick: The Story of the Evergreen Brickworks), Heritage Toronto Awards

== Filmography ==
Year	Film
1998	Win/Loss/Tie
1998	I'm a Big Girl
1999	Roadkill Travelogue
1999	Vicious Cycles
1999	My Father's Hands
2001	Bagatelle
2002	Yin yin/Jade Love
2003	Love, Sex and Eating the Bones
2008	Guns
2010	Badge of Pride
2011	She's the Mayor
2011	Brick by Brick
2012	Home Again
2020	Stateless
2021	Subjects of Desire
2022	BLK, An Origin Story
2024	40 Acres
2026	#WhileBlack
