= Haven season 4 =

Haven
- Season 4
- Region 1 DVD cover
- Starring: Emily Rose; Lucas Bryant; Eric Balfour
- No. of episodes: 13

Release
- Original network: Syfy
- Original release: September 13 – December 13, 2013

Season chronology
- ← Previous; Season 3 Next → Season 5

The fourth season of the American television series Haven premiered on September 13, 2013, and consisted a total of 13 episodes. The show stars Emily Rose, Lucas Bryant and Eric Balfour.

== Cast ==
=== Main cast ===
- Emily Rose as Audrey Parker / Mara
- Lucas Bryant as Nathan Wuornos
- Eric Balfour as Duke Crocker

=== Recurring cast ===
- Richard Donat as Vince Teagues
- John Dunsworth as Dave Teagues
- Adam "Edge" Copeland (credited as both Adam Copeland and WWE Superstar Edge) as Dwight Hendrickson
- Kate Kelton as Jordan McKee
- Colin Ferguson as William^{a}
- Emma Lahana as Jennifer Mason
- Christian Camargo as Wade Crocker
- Jayne Eastwood as Gloria Verrano
- Robert Maillet as Heavy^{b}

a Credited as a special guest star.
b Also credited in the cast bill in "Survivors".

=== Guest stars ===
- Nicole de Boer as Marion Caldwell
- Kandyse McClure as Carrie Benson
- Craig Olejnik as Aiden Driscoll
- Darri Ingolfsson as Jack Driscoll
- Kenneth Mitchell as Cliff
- Danny Masterson as Anderson Harris
- Kris Lemche as Seth Byrne
- Michael Hogan as Lincoln Harker

== Episodes ==
No. overall	No. in season	Title	Directed by	Written by	Original release date	US viewers (millions)
40	1	"Fallout"	Shawn Piller	Gabrielle Stanton	September 13, 2013	1.55
Duke is ejected from the barn, after only being in there for a few seconds, where he finds himself six months after the events of the meteor storm and meets a young woman with a mysterious connection to Haven.
41	2	"Survivors"	Shawn Piller	Nora Zuckerman & Lilla Zuckerman	September 20, 2013	1.36
Duke needs Nathan to focus less of his attention on finding Audrey and deal with the more pressing problem of a person who appears to be immolating the residents of Haven in broad daylight.
42	3	"Bad Blood"	Rob Lieberman	Shernold Edwards	September 27, 2013	1.54
Nathan and Dwight race to search for the Trouble behind a series of exsanguinated corpses before more blood is spilled. Meanwhile, Duke must convince his brother to leave Haven before he learns the truth of the Crocker family trouble.
43	4	"Lost and Found"	Lee Rose	Speed Weed	October 4, 2013	1.49
Nathan and Dwight investigate missing children that are linked to an ancient legend. Duke tries to find Audrey with help from Jennifer's Trouble.
44	5	"The New Girl"	Rick Bota	Brian Millikin	October 11, 2013	1.59
Nathan struggles to come to terms with the fact that although Lexie is the spitting image of Audrey, her personality is the total opposite as the two work together to investigate a deadly Trouble that seems to alter the behavior of its victims.
45	6	"Countdown"	Jeff Renfroe	Matt McGuiness	October 18, 2013	1.45
Audrey, Nathan and Duke find themselves in a race against time to find the Troubled person responsible for turning people hard as stone.
46	7	"Lay Me Down"	Paul Fox	Nora Zuckerman & Lilla Zuckerman	October 25, 2013	1.45
A trouble that turns dreams into deadly nightmares plagues the residents of Haven. At the same time, Duke finds himself in a difficult situation dealing with his pain-in-the-neck brother.
47	8	"Crush"	Stephen Reynolds	Speed Weed	November 1, 2013	1.33
The people of Haven are terrorized by a menace from the deep sea.
48	9	"William"	Grant Harvey	Shernold Edwards	November 8, 2013	1.72
Audrey believes the two thugs from the barn are holding William as a hostage.
49	10	"The Trouble with Troubles"	T. W. Peacocke	Nora Zuckerman & Lilla Zuckerman & Brian Millikin	November 15, 2013	1.57
Audrey finds herself in a different Haven where troubles don't exist.
50	11	"Shot in the Dark"	Mairzee Almas	Nick Parker	November 22, 2013	1.46
Word that a monster from folklore is in Haven brings the ghost-hunting Darkside Seekers to town. And that creates a problem for Audrey and the gang.
51	12	"When the Bough Breaks"	Lee Rose	Speed Weed & Shernold Edwards	December 6, 2013	1.36
William is determined to convince Audrey of the truth behind her origins. A seemingly unstoppable curse is unleashed.
52	13	"The Lighthouse"	Shawn Piller	Matt McGuiness & Gabrielle Stanton	December 13, 2013	1.25
Audrey fights to remain herself as she tracks down William to sever their ethereal connection.

== Production ==
On April 9, 2013, Syfy renewed Haven for a fourth season of thirteen episodes, which premiered in September 2013. Production began on May 8, 2013, with the premiere picking up six months after the events of the season 3 finale. Former Eureka actor Colin Ferguson joined the cast as William, a stranger whose secret agenda leads him to Audrey. Emma Lahana and former Dexter actor Christian Camargo were cast in recurring roles as Jennifer Mason and Wade Crocker respectively.

Season 4 includes a social media storyline featuring a pair of paranormal investigators known as the Darkside Seekers who star in their own reality show while on a mission to expose Haven's secrets. Danny Masterson and Kris Lemche guest-starred in a cross-over episode ("Shot in the Dark") with Masterson playing the cameraman Anderson Harris and Lemche as the host of Darkside Seekers TV Seth Byrne.

== Home media release ==
The Complete Fourth Season
Set details	Special features	
13 episodes; 4-disc set; 1.78:1 aspect ratio; Subtitles: English, Spanish, French (USA version not Including); English (Dolby Digital 5.1 Surround); English (Master Audio 5.1 Surround) – Blu-ray	Thirteen "Inside Haven" Featurettes; "Darkside Seekers" Webisode Series; Six Audio Commentaries with the Writers; Panel Highlights from San Diego Comic Con, Nerd HQ and New York Comic Con; Three Interviews With the Cast; Pancakes: The Morning After Deleted Scene; Behind-the-Scenes; Blooper Reel; Haven: In the Beginning comic	
DVD release dates
Region 1	Region 2	Region 4
August 26, 2014	TBA	October 15, 2014
