= List of Haven characters =

Haven is a supernatural drama television series loosely based on the Stephen King novel, The Colorado Kid. The show, filmed on the South Shore of Nova Scotia, Canada, is an American/Canadian co-production. Haven is also the name of the town where the protagonist goes, discovering numerous townsfolk afflicted with supernatural problems. Haven residents refer to these problems collectively as 'The Troubles'. Each episode deals with an incident arising from the town's Troubles. The following list includes all the principal fictional characters who have appeared in the television series.

== Main characters ==
=== Audrey Parker ===
Emily Rose. From The Tides That Bind.

Played by Emily Rose. Audrey is an FBI agent without any personal ties or any known friendships. She is an orphan and never knew her parents. She is sent to Haven, Maine chasing an escaped prisoner and encounters Haven's supernatural Troubles in the process. After successfully resolving a situation involving a Troubled person she is invited to stay by Chief Wuornos, both for her ability to "see what's right in front of [her]" and her sympathetic method of dealing with those afflicted by The Troubles. Audrey also seems immune to The Troubles, making her better adapted to helping those afflicted. Initially, she is "on loan" to Haven's Police Department, but eventually quits the FBI in order to take a permanent job with Haven PD and continue helping the town in dealing with The Troubles.

Audrey is further linked to the town when she is given an old newspaper clipping with the heading "Who Killed The Colorado Kid?", bearing a picture of a woman named Lucy Ripley who strongly resembles her. Audrey spends much of her time investigating Lucy's past and the possibility that she is her mother, but she uncovers evidence that Lucy may, in fact, be Audrey herself. In the Season 1 finale, she concludes that she and Lucy are the same person, moments before a woman identifying herself as "Special Agent Audrey Parker" confronts her and Nathan. As Audrey gets to know Audrey #2, she discovers that they share memories or, perhaps more accurately, her memories are those of Audrey #2.

Audrey seems to have had more than one past life, for, beside the evidence that she is in fact Lucy Ripley, in Fear and Loathing there is another woman apparently from the past who looks like Audrey and Lucy. When Dave Teagues sees the Troubled Jackie Clarke, who appears to the people who look at her as their worst fear, he sees a woman with curly red hair, 1950s clothing and Audrey's face (later revealed to be named Sarah Vernon). Dave's fear arises from an earlier outbreak of The Troubles, so the person who is now Audrey appears to return to Haven whenever there is an outbreak of The Troubles. On another occasion, Audrey discovers she can instinctively play the piano, even though Audrey Parker never learned.

In Business As Usual, Audrey finally meets the real Lucy Ripley. In the 1980s Audrey, as Lucy Ripley, arrived in Haven and helped the Troubled. The real Lucy explains that Audrey/Lucy discovered something about the Troubles, how they began and possibly how they could be stopped. On the run from someone who wanted to "erase" her, Audrey/Lucy sought out the real Lucy, telling her that one day, she (Audrey/Lucy) would seek her out. At the end of a cycle of Troubles, Audrey entered a building that appeared as a barn and had her memory erased. However, Audrey/Lucy refused to enter the barn and tried to escape, though she was captured and brought to the barn, as explained by Jordan McKee in Burned. After learning that Simon Crocker was one of the ones who was chasing her, Audrey confronted Duke, and the pair discovered that the Crocker family has been trying to kill her for some time (Business As Usual).

Later the Teagues brothers have a conversation which reveals that the person who is Audrey/Lucy has visited Haven before under the name of Sarah Vernon and - as Dave mentioned - before that time at least once more under a name unknown to the Teagues. Sarah is a nurse sent to Haven by her captain—who is Audrey's Agent Howard—to look after returning veterans from WWII (Sarah). When Nathan is thrown back to 1955, he and Sarah have a brief relationship. The Colorado Kid (James Cogan) is the result (Thanks for the Memories).

In season 4, Audrey gets trapped inside the Barn and receives a new identity and set of memories, now believed herself to be a woman named Lexie DeWitt, Audrey was spending her days tending bar at the Oatley Tap Room, a façade created by the dying Barn. She believed that she was an ordinary girl who had been working at the Oatley Tap Room with her new friend Rhonda for a month, when a mysterious stranger named William started to change things. Audrey also discovers that her original personality is Mara, a ruthless, manipulative, mean and devious person that came from the world beyond the Void. She and William are the original creators of The Troubles and both possess the ability to create, modify, and strengthen them at will, however, Mara appears to have a particularly adept talent of controlling and manipulating the troubles. The only person she ever cares for is William, as he is her only weakness because they are connected. Her mission is to wreak havoc on Haven once again and find a way to get William back.

In season 5, they first believed Audrey was dead. Mara had taken over Audrey's body, and doing so had killed Audrey. Soon figuring out that Audrey was still alive, Audrey convinced Duke and Nathan that they needed to talk to her as if she were Audrey, so it'd be easier to come back. With Audrey dying in Mara's body, one of the troubles Duke released caused Audrey and Mara to separate into two different people. Not long after, however, Audrey started to get sick for unknown reasons. They believed at first she was troubled, but Charlotte realized that Audrey was dying because of the split. Audrey couldn't survive on her own without being in Mara's body, so she was going to die. Charlotte was the only person with the means to merge them back together, and Charlotte was going to make Mara the predominant mind in their body. Audrey was willing to sacrifice herself in Mara's body if it meant that Mara was going to be a better person, but Charlotte at the last second made Audrey the controller of their body. Towards the end of the season, Nathan, Dwight, Vincent and Audrey decided to make a new barn to destroy the Troubles. In order to do that, however, they needed to sacrifice someone's love. They had originally wanted to sacrifice Croatoan, but he didn't love anyone, so Audrey volunteered. A while after the sacrifice, she came back with a new personality as Paige and had a baby boy named James. Nathan stopped his car to help her after her car wouldn't start, linking back to the beginning of the series. In the barn Vince said that she couldn't come back as Audrey so she chose to come back as someone new so Nathan could fall in love with her all over again.

=== Nathan Wuornos ===
Lucas Bryant. From Sparks and Recreation.

Played by Lucas Bryant. Nathan is a local police officer who becomes Audrey's partner. He doesn't have the sensation of touch. His relationship with his father, the Chief of Police, Garland Wuornos, is problematic. In fact, Nathan discovers he isn't his real father in the Season 1 finale when a man named Max Hansen, who also cannot feel pain, comes back to town. As time passes after the Chief's death Nathan comes more and more to appreciate him and wishes he could have asked him the right questions while he was still alive to have understood him better then. Though he will always be "the Chief", the term, once a rejection of a father, becomes a sign of affection.

Nathan has a condition that he calls idiopathic neuropathy and therefore physically can't feel anything, though his condition is a result of the Troubles. Nathan can only feel one thing: Audrey's touch. He keeps this information to himself until the end of Season 1, when he tells her. As a result, he develops intimate feelings for Audrey as they continue to work together. When Nathan is sent back to 1955, he meets Audrey's earlier incarnation, Sarah, with whom he has an affair. As a result, Sarah becomes pregnant, making Nathan the father of her son, James Cogan (Thanks for the Memories).

As children, Duke and his friends used their knowledge of Nathan's condition to bully him. In one instance, they had a competition to see how many tacks they could stick in Nathan's back before being caught. They then convinced Nathan to talk to a popular girl who was horrified when she saw his condition. Nathan blames Duke for triggering the return of his Trouble as it reemerged during a fight between the two of them. Because of their past, Nathan and Duke resent one another, though their mutual interest in Audrey's well-being has helped to improve their relationship.

In Fear and Loathing he temporarily has his condition "stolen" from him by the Troubled Ian Haskell. He thoroughly enjoys being able to feel again, but, when faced with Haskell's imminent death, he gives up his chance to feel to save Jackie Clark from what he considers to be a much worse affliction.

Nathan tries to infiltrate the Guard, an organization that protects the Troubled, by starting a relationship with Jordan McKee (Over My Head). This affair ends after she commits several bad acts including kidnapping Ginger, a Troubled child, and threatening Audrey (Burned). Unable to stop Audrey from entering the barn, Nathan tries to force Agent Howard to help. Jordan shoots Nathan, who in turn shoots Howard.

In Fallout, he is shown to be in hiding since he is being targeted by the Guard for shooting Howard and disrupting the cycle, meaning the Troubles are still happening. He reluctantly rejoins the Haven Police Department so that he can use police resources in order to try to find Audrey, in return for helping Dwight dealing with the Troubled. He intends to let Audrey kill him in order to end the Troubles once and for all.

=== Garland Wuornos ===
Garland Wuornos, played by Nicholas Campbell (season 1; guest seasons 2-3), was the Haven Chief of Police. He is very hard on his son, Nathan, and claims that he is trying to toughen him up so Nathan can better deal with The Troubles. The Chief has taken a liking to Audrey because she can handle The Troubles well and hopes this talent will rub off on Nathan (and the fact that he knew Lucy Ripley). He offered Audrey a job with the Haven Police in return for helping her find out about the Colorado Kid murder and the identity of the woman in the picture. It is later revealed that he is Nathan's adoptive father, who took Nathan in after his real father, Max Hansen, was investigated for the murder of the Colorado Kid.

In the Season 1 finale it is revealed that Chief Wuornos is also Troubled: the cracks that are seen around Haven are the manifestations of his affliction. He had been able to control his Trouble until Max Hansen came back to town. This led to him losing control and first the lighthouse cracked up, then a crack in a road appeared that swallowed Hansen. When the struggles became too much for him, he shattered into stones rather than cause Haven to crack apart and be destroyed. Before this happens he explains that he had been holding it together for such a long time, waiting for Audrey to arrive on the scene, but not everyone is thrilled she's back.

In the Season 2 finale the ghost of Garland Wuornos returns to Haven along with a number of the Haven dead. He is proud of Nathan and gives him encouragement to continue, though discourages Nathan's feelings for Audrey. She is too important to allow feelings to cloud one's judgment and cause errors. He departs with the death of Kyle Hopkins, the Troubled gravedigger who was responsible for the ghosts' presence.

His most recent appearance was in the episode (Sarah) where he is found in both alternated Haven and in 1955 Haven. In the alternated Haven, he tries to help Audrey and Claire escape and in 1955 as a young boy played by (Jordan Poole) sitting outside the Haven Police Station where Nathan encounters him.

=== Duke Crocker ===
Eric Balfour. From The Tides That Bind.

Played by Eric Balfour. Duke is a charming young rogue who runs a shady import/export business from his boat, the Cape Rouge, no questions asked. He will move things for most people if the price is right and he doesn't care to know what it is he is moving. The police, including Nathan, believe him to be a smuggler. People of questionable repute sometimes come to him to get quiet passage out of the country. Recently, with The Troubles and with his acquisition of the Grey Gull restaurant, he has taken on a more civic attitude to his business affairs.

Duke was also the little boy in the 'Colorado Kid' picture. He and Nathan do not get along and he seems to have taken a liking to Audrey, to Nathan's annoyance. He has taken over the diner formerly owned by a friend who was forced out of business by an affliction that is part of the recent recurrence of The Troubles. Vanessa Stanley, afflicted with the sight of a person's death when she touches them, told Duke he would die at the hand of someone with the same maze tattoo as the person who killed the Colorado Kid. In "A Tale Of Two Audreys", it is revealed that he is married to a woman named Evi.

Duke has come back to Haven because of his father, Simon Crocker, who had made him promise to return if The Troubles ever broke out again. He didn't tell Duke why before he died, but Duke has fulfilled the promise. Duke discovers his father was killed during the previous outbreak of The Troubles. The Rev. Ed Driscoll has been using Evi to manipulate Duke who he believes will be important in dealing with The Troubles.

After a lengthy search, Duke eventually unravels the mystery of a silver box he and Evi found. It contains a number of artifacts and weapons, as well as a family journal. In his father's entries Duke discovers why his father wanted him to return to Haven: to kill the woman now known as Audrey Parker. Duke then learns that he has inherited his father's trouble: the power to 'destroy' other troubles (which his father refers to as 'curses') so that they will no longer be passed down to the next generation. The catch is that he must kill the person currently exhibiting a trouble to destroy that trouble permanently. When a Crocker injures or kills someone with a Trouble, contact with their blood causes him to enter a partially enraged state, which also dramatically enhances his strength. Duke, however, refuses to give in to his Trouble and buries the box at his father's grave. He avoids using his Trouble except when it can be beneficial, for example when he rescued Daphne (Over My Head).

Duke has always had an affinity for Audrey and, while Nathan was involved with Jordan McKee, it almost blossomed into a physical relationship, but, after a heavy kiss in Colorado, Audrey thought it wiser not to go further (Magic Hour). In "Thanks for the Memories" Duke dives into the barn as it disappears, shortly after admitting to Nathan that he indeed has feelings for Audrey. Duke emerges from the barn to discover that six months have passed and most in Haven believe him dead. He helps Nathan get back to the town to help out the Troubled and is surprised to find that in his absence, his brother Wade has taken over the bar. When Wade discovers his wife has been cheating on him, he decides to stay in the town with Duke helping his brother out.

== Recurring characters ==
=== Vince Teagues ===
Played by Richard Donat. Vince runs the local newspaper with his brother whom he lovingly bickers with. He is the more reflective brother. Vince and his brother are very helpful to Audrey and appear to be some of the most open people in Haven. He also agrees to keep quiet about The Troubles. He is a talented sketch artist as well. Beneath his mild exterior is a person who can be menacing, as seen when he talked with Max Hansen in the first-season finale. In the later episodes of season 2, a conflict is growing between Vince and his brother about the Troubles, with Vince supporting Audrey and Nathan. In "Over My Head", it is revealed that along with his brother, he owns nearly half the commercial real estate in Haven, as well millions of dollars in off-shore bank accounts. In "Magic Hour", he admits that he and his brother manipulated Audrey and others, although he says it was for benevolent purposes. In "Thanks for the Memories" Vince explains to Duke that he is the leader of the Guard and has protected Duke from those in the Guard who wanted to kill Duke.

Vince has shown that he was in love with Sarah Vernon (Audrey in the 1950s) as his brother was.

=== Dave Teagues ===
Played by John Dunsworth. Dave also runs the local newspaper with his brother who he lovingly bickers with. He is the more impulsive brother. Dave, like his brother, appears to be very open to Audrey and willing to help her in any way he can, even keeping the resurfacing of The Troubles quiet. He is also a photography enthusiast and a member of the local hunting club. In the later episodes of season 2, a conflict is growing between Dave and his brother over the Troubles, with Dave seeming to support using Duke's abilities to end them. In "Over My Head", it is revealed that along with his brother, he owns nearly half the commercial real estate in Haven, as well millions of dollars in off-shore bank accounts. He is also more inclined to keep things secret, clashing with his brother, who is more inclined to divulge information to support Audrey and others.

In Business as Usual and onwards, it is revealed that he knew Audrey as Sarah in the 1950s (the woman as his worst fear) and might have been in love with her. Vince, Dave and Sarah attempted to blow up the barn in 1955, but to no avail (Thanks for the Memories).

=== Ed Driscoll ===
Played by Stephen McHattie (seasons 2; guest season 1). Edmund ("Ed") Driscoll, who has been known to like alcohol, is the amoral preacher at the Good Shepherd Church. He is the husband of Penny Driscoll, the father of Hannah Driscoll, and the foster-grandfather of Bobby Mueller. In the first season, Driscoll sees The Troubles as a curse from God, because of wrongdoings by the townspeople. He wants all the Troubled people to ask for God's forgiveness. In the second season, he seems to have a more mundane view of The Troubles, seeing them a threat that can and must be eliminated, a belief that seems to stem from the loss of his wife and all others The Troubles have killed. He tries to bring Duke onto his side in the struggle he's fighting against the Troubled (starting in the season 2 premiere A Tale of Two Audreys) and he uses Evi to manipulate Duke (see end of episode The Tides That Bind). Driscoll sees himself as the unTroubled Havenfolk's champion. In Who, What, Where, Wendigo?, he promises to tell Duke more about The Troubles and his role in them. The Rev. also takes the opportunity to hunt a Troubled person, Amelia Benton, with the specific aim of killing her, but, at the moment he is about to kill, Audrey shoots him to save Amelia's life and Driscoll dies.

=== Evidence "Evi" Ryan ===
Evi, played by Vinessa Antoine (season 2), is the ex-wife of Duke. She is aware of his past on the shady side of the law and is not averse to working outside the law herself. She indicates that she wants to come back into Duke's life. However, she "does have an agenda... She was sent to Haven by someone from Duke’s past". In fact, Evi speaks with a person by phone in Roots, telling him that Duke doesn't know why his father wanted him to come back to Haven. The voice on the phone turns out to be Ed Driscoll. Evi has been helping him maneuver Duke. When Duke discovers Evi has been working with Driscoll (Lockdown), she says that she was doing what she was told and that it was for his best interest. Upset by Duke's reaction to the betrayal, Evi finally realizes the danger she has brought to everyone. She runs out of the police station to call off the gunmen outside, but she is shot and killed by a sniper.

=== Chris Brody ===
Chris, played by Jason Priestley (season 2; guest season 5) is a handsome, but anti-social marine biologist and son of the very popular Mayor Brody. He describes himself to Audrey as "a cynical jackass". He has a scientific approach to the world, preferring to observe and analyze in order to understand things. When the mayor dies in Sparks and Recreation, Chris "inherits" his Trouble, the ability to influence people favorably when they look at him. People lose their normal will and fawn over him with the notable exception of Audrey who The Troubles do not affect. Chris has great difficulty in dealing with the unwanted attention, as people stop behaving rationally. He is first attracted to Audrey because she doesn't fawn over him. As he gets to know her he finds her "amazing". They get closer to each other and develop a romantic relationship, until Audrey experiences his death in her cyclically repeated day off (Audrey Parker's Day Off). She realizes that it is selfish of her to think of Chris when she has to save all the Troubled people in Haven. She sends Chris off to London. He returns later (Lockdown), but his affliction tempted him to do as he pleases which irritated and almost killed Audrey. From the experience, he broke up with her to become a better person. Chris resurfaced in season 5 while video chatting with Dave and Dwight, warning them to get Charlotte out of Haven.

=== Dwight Hendrickson ===
Dwight, played by Adam "Edge" Copeland (seasons 2–5) is a mysterious Haven resident that Nathan only learned about after his father's death. He had helped the Chief deal with the aftermath of incidents caused by the Troubles by working as a cleaner. During his first appearance in Sparks and Recreation, he proudly quotes the Chief saying, "I'm Dwight; I clean things up" after Audrey asked him if he does both electrical and construction work. Dwight is also "a former Army Ranger felled by a supernatural affliction in Afghanistan." That affliction is revealed to be attracting bullets (Lockdown) after he saved Nathan from one of the gunmen outside the Haven police station. He later explains his affliction to Duke (Business as Usual). Even his dad knew about it, but refused to think he and Dwight were Troubled. Dwight came to Haven through the invitation of The Guard, an organization whose aim is to help the Troubled. However, Dwight became disenchanted and left The Guard.

During the search for Rory Campbell who had gone missing in the woods, it was revealed that Dwight had a young daughter named Lizzie (Who, What, Where, Wendigo?). In a series of webisodes, Dwight explains that she died when The Guard members came to deal with him. The emotional turmoil triggered in her the family affliction of being a bullet magnet and Lizzie is killed by a stray bullet.

Vince appointed him as Haven's Chief of Police after Nathan leaves the town and spends six months hiding from the Guard. Dwight has been faced with dealing with the fallout of the meteor storm, the Troubles not subsiding, the disappearance of Nathan, and the believed deaths of Audrey and Duke. It is mentioned that a lot of Haven's residents have given up hope and he has been tasked with trying to keep the town of Haven together. When Nathan returns, Dwight hires him as a detective on the force but Nathan points that it is just temporary until he finds Audrey.

Season 5 reveals Dwight is close friends with McHugh (played by Copeland's real-life close friend Jay "Christian" Reso).

=== Agent Byron Howard ===
Played by Maurice Dean Wint (season 3; guest seasons 1–2 & 5). Howard was Audrey Parker's boss until she resigned in order to stay in Haven. He came to her apartment to give her the Haven assignment. He has a deeper understanding of the events in Haven than what he has heard from Audrey. He is not the person he seems. Howard is never seen in an FBI office or with other FBI agents. Unbeknown to Audrey he knew Garland Wuornos and kept in contact with him by phone. He takes a book, "Unstake My Heart", from Audrey before he sends her to Haven, which is found in a hotel room Howard stayed at. It contained a clue in the form of geographical coordinates that led Audrey #2 to a building on Kick'em Jenny Neck where she lost her memory. Audrey #2's Agent Howard (the real Agent Howard) is not the same person. Our Agent Howard is the same person who, as an army captain, sent Sarah (outfitted with the memories and identity of an army nurse) to Haven (Sarah).

Agent Howard's role is directly attached to the barn, acting as a facilitator to Audrey and her previous incarnations, helping to situate her in Haven and returning to bring her back to the barn when the meteor storm arrives (Thanks for the Memories). He is shot by Nathan after Audrey enters the barn, but his body disappears with the barn. Because of this, the 27-year cycle was disrupted.

=== Claire Callahan ===
Claire, played by Bree Williamson (season 3), is a psychiatrist who works with Troubled people to help them adjust. She has worked behind the scenes with many of the Troubled people that Audrey has helped. She says her job starts when Audrey's has finished.

Claire, in season three, becomes a major ally to Audrey as Audrey tries to remember things from her past lives, eventually resulting in Audrey getting enough information to ID the Colorado Kid. Her medical background makes her a great aid in many cases involving the Troubled, and her ability to work with Audrey makes her valuable as Audrey investigates her own history.

In Last Goodbyes, Claire is revealed to be a skin used by Arla Cogan, having been killed a few days earlier.

=== Arla Cogan ===
Arla, played by Laura Vandervoort (guest season 3), Tim Post (cast season 3), Deborah Tennant (cast season 3), Dorian Missick (season 3) and Bree Williamson (guest season 3) was James Cogan's wife and the real identity of The Bolt-Gun Killer who kills people for their skins, people including Boston detective Tommy Bowen, an unknown male figurine, Roslyn Toomey, the Guardsman, Grady and Claire Callahan. Her first two victims were an unknown figurine and Roslyn Toomey. Arla in Tommy's skin pretends to have some unstated problems back in Boston (as indicated by her disposing of a body of the real Tommy soon after his arrival in Haven) and has decided to stay in Haven at the request of police chief Nathan Wuornos. She indicates that he is skeptical about the Troubles, but is willing to work with Nathan.

In the two part episode "Magic Hour", Nathan finds evidence that indicates "Tommy" is the Bolt Gun Killer and Duke identifies him as Troubled, but it was later revealed that the killer is not "Tommy" (he didn't have the Guard tattoo seen on a security camera). Arla in Tommy's skin tortures Vince and Dave to find out about the Colorado Kid and about the mysterious barn. She is apparently killed while trying to escape from Audrey and Nathan when the boat suddenly explodes.

In "Burned", a body is found which is identified through dental records to have been the real Tommy, killed by the Bolt Gun Killer not long before she appeared in Haven in Tommy's skin days after kidnapping Audrey while disguised as both an unknown male figurine and Roslyn Tooomey, for the killer is able to "wear" skins of other people to impersonate them.

Arla was not killed in the boat explosion, as Tommy's skin is later found in her lair where Audrey and Nathan also discovered another tank that houses the next victim's skin. Unbeknowst to both, Arla's next victim was Claire Callahan.

=== Jordan McKee ===
Jordan, played by Kate Kelton (seasons 3–4), is a waitress at the Gun & Rose Cafe. She always wears gloves because she is a Troubled person—her touch causes intense pain, so she can never touch people and so never get close to anyone. Her Trouble was triggered when she was raped. She became a patient of Claire Callahan, though Claire stopped treating her when it was discovered that she had captured her rapist and tortured him for three days with her "taser" touch.

Jordan now works for the Guard, a group of Troubled people who look after their own any way they can, including bringing newly afflicted people to Haven; they are the townspeople who bear the maze tattoo. Nathan contacts her trying to infiltrate the Guard, as a tattooed person is suspected to be the Bolt-Gun Killer. What started out as a police investigation leads Nathan into a relationship with Jordan, after Audrey had become aloof. Nathan cannot feel the pain of Jordan's touch so she can be intimate with him. Nathan has some commitment to Jordan, despite the fact that she used him to help a prisoner escape. The prisoner she helped was Troubled and she was doing her job.

The two continued their relationship until the episode "Burned", in which Jordan attempts to kidnap a Troubled girl named Ginger with the hopes of using her as a means of forcing Audrey to enter the barn which appears to have something to do with the Troubles. Although Jordan has no idea what the connection is between Audrey and the barn, she reveals to Nathan, Audrey, and Duke, that once the barn appears and Audrey enters it, both disappear, bringing the Troubles to an end for twenty-seven years, when they return and Audrey is needed again. Though arrested by Nathan, he exchanges her for Ginger and her father who were prisoners of the Guard. With this her relationship with Nathan ends.

When Audrey steps into the barn, Jordan is shot after she shoots Nathan, as he was trying to stop the process that would take the Troubles. It is revealed in the comic Haven: After the Storm that she survived the gunshot wound.

In Countdown, Jordan decided to leave Haven so that she can start a new life, only to be killed by Wade Crocker, after she refused to answer his question about what was the plan to end the Troubles.

=== William ===
Played by Colin Ferguson (seasons 4–5), is a mysterious figure who first appears in the bar where Lexie DeWitt works as a bartender. (Lexie is the faux incarnation of Audrey Parker) He helps her see that the bar is not a real place and he slowly brings her to see that she is not who she thinks she is. Eventually, with his help, she is able to escape the bar and cross over to this world and Haven.

William has an ulterior motive for his action. He has prior knowledge of who Audrey was originally and wants to reconnect with her. When William appears in Haven he is captive of the two thugs who came into the bar (William). However, this was a deception, as the thugs work for William and their goal is to make Audrey see who she really is (The Trouble with Troubles).

=== Jennifer Mason ===
Played by Emma Lahana (season 4), Jennifer is a young woman from Boston with psychiatric problems, hearing voices and needing medication. Jennifer, however, has a special relationship with the barn and the voices that she hears are from those inside it. She has heard Audrey and Agent Howard and when she sees a report about Duke suddenly appearing in a seal pool at the local aquarium, she goes to visit him, helps him escape police custody and travels to Haven with him. Currently, she is in a relationship with him and works for the Teagues brothers. She dies in the season 4 finale and her body was found in season 5.

=== Wade Crocker ===
Wade, played by Christian Camargo (season 4), is Duke's estranged brother.

=== Gloria Verrano ===
Played by Jayne Eastwood (seasons 4–5), is Haven's medical examiner in Season 4. Her first appearance was in "Countdown". She is tough as nails and very little gets past her.

=== Charlotte Cross ===
Played by Laura Mennell (season 5), Charlotte came to Haven as a CDC scientist to investigate the infection on Dave Teagues' leg. Dave whom he controlled into murdering Charlotte.

=== Eleanor Carr ===
Eleanor, played by Mary-Colin Chisholm (season 1), is an EMT in Haven. She knows what she wants and is instinctively bossy. She has experienced The Troubles and is wary of outsiders, but she takes a liking to Audrey. Eleanor is the mother of Julia Carr and she was killed at a party that was thrown for Audrey, when she was pushed down a flight of stairs by the chameleon in As You Were.

=== Julia Carr ===
Julia, played by Michelle Monteith (season 1) is the daughter of Eleanor Carr, and a surgeon with Doctors Without Borders, having spent time in Darfur. Her grandfather had the same tattoo as the one on the man who killed the Colorado Kid and she shows Duke that all the grave stones in the cemetery where her grandfather is buried bear the same symbol. She also has the same tattoo, which she may be able to make disappear and reappear on her body.

=== Jess Minnion ===
Jess, played by Anne Caillon (season 1) is an animal rights activist, an employee of the Hessberg Medical Center, and a resident of Haven, Maine. She briefly dated Nathan before leaving for Montreal, unable to cope with the chaos of the Troubles.

She is part Mi'kmaq, and because of this she opposes sport hunting (although she is not opposed to hunting for food). If she finds any animals wounded or poisoned by hunters, she cares for them and buries the dead in marked graves.

=== Audrey Parker ===
Special Agent Audrey Parker, played by Kathleen Munroe (season 2; co-guest season 1), arrives at the end of the Season 1 finale Spiral. She has come to Haven to investigate the impersonation of an FBI agent (i.e. Audrey impersonating the real Audrey Parker). She has the same memories as Audrey. Once she experiences "The Troubles", the two Audreys become friends. Real Audrey, investigating the man who sent Audrey to Haven, follows a lead to a building (The Barn) outside Haven where she loses her memory and her fiancé takes her away from Haven.

== Minor characters ==
=== Stan the Cop ===
Played by Glen Lefchak. Stan has been seen at the Haven P.D. from early in the series. When Nathan is in need of a police officer he is usually at hand.

=== Dr. Lucassi ===
Played by Christopher Shore (seasons 1–4). He is Haven's medical examiner, Dr. Lucassi. He first appeared in "Harmony" as a doctor at a psychiatric facility, but has been Haven's M.E. since '"The Tides That Bind", though mainly in Season 3.

== Other characters ==
Many of Haven's characters only appear in one episode. Below are three of them. (See also The Troubled.)

=== Vanessa Stanley ===
Played by Cynthia Preston. Vanessa was a Troubled person, whose affliction caused her to see the last thing a person she touches sees, which means how the person dies. When she was young she was Duke Crocker's babysitter and she was also present the day the Colorado Kid was killed. Her affliction caused her so much difficulty she preferred to die rather than live with the grief, unable to prevent what she saw. One of the people she touched was Duke Crocker, which caused her to see how Duke would die. She saw a hand belonging to an arm with a maze tattoo coming towards his face. From this time on Duke became very interested in the tattoo. (The Hand You're Dealt)

=== Max Hansen ===
Played by John Bourgeois. Hansen was the biological father of Nathan Wuornos. During the previous outbreak of The Troubles he was sent to prison for the murder of a Haven family. Chief Garland Wuornos was convinced he also murdered the Colorado Kid. When he was released from prison he came back to Haven to claim the family that was taken from him, i.e. Nathan, and to seek revenge. He indicated that he had a lot of support in the town. Hansen was a Troubled person, who like his son could not feel anything.

When he sees Audrey he seems to recognize her, obviously remembering Lucy Ripley, and responding to Audrey's question "Do I know you?" he says, "Maybe you do. You'll figure it out." When leaving he mysteriously wishes her good luck. Hansen knows Vince and Dave Teagues and indicates that Dave owes him for something. When Audrey later accuses him of killing the Colorado Kid, Hansen, noticeably angered, responded that Garland Wuornos thought so, but he never proved it. When he sees Vince he threatens to kill him the next time he sees him and Vince responds that he couldn't get it done the last time.

Hansen had a tattoo on his arm in the form of a maze. Duke Crocker believed that he was the person who would kill him. Hansen's return disturbed Chief Wuornos so much that he lost control of his own affliction which led to Hansen being swallowed up by a crack in the road. (Spiral)

=== Penny Driscoll ===
Played by Brenda Bazinet. Penny was the wife of the Rev. Ed Driscoll and the mother of Hanna Driscoll. In 1983 when he came to Haven, she saw the man that he had become, leading her to realize she could no longer live with him. She had an affair with Cole Glendower and faked her own death to escape the Rev. She married Glendower, taking the name Gwen. She knew all about Cole Glendower's Trouble, i.e. the fact that he had to return to the sea when there was an outbreak of The Troubles, yet loved him anyway. She persuaded Driscoll to intervene for the Glendower boys to save them from certain death, telling him that he wasn't fighting Troubled people because it was the right thing to do, but for revenge because she had left him for a Troubled person. She intended to wait for the return of Cole Glendower. (The Tides That Bind)

== The Colorado Kid ==
The Colorado Kid is a character who is mentioned but does not appear until a flashback in the middle of season 3. He disappeared and may have been murdered in 1983 during the previous outbreak of The Troubles, though no-one in Haven can remember anything about the event. In fact the evidence box held at the police station, though sealed when examined, contained nothing. The Haven Herald published a photograph to go with its front-page story on the police investigation. The photo shows a body propped up against a wooden pier, observed by a young woman, Lucy Ripley, and a young boy, Duke Crocker, with a police photographer, Morris Crane, and a policeman, the young Garland Wuornos, tending three onlookers. One of these onlookers is young Vanessa Stanley.

In the episode The Hand You're Dealt, Stanley tells Duke that the man who killed the Colorado Kid had a tattoo and that same person would eventually kill him. Chief Wuornos is convinced that Max Hansen killed the Colorado Kid. While Hansen has the tattoo, he indicates that he didn't do it.

In the season 3 premiere 301, Audrey Parker's kidnapper, a figure who remains in the dark, indicates that Lucy was in love with the Colorado Kid and that he may in fact still be alive. This new information causes his coffin to be exhumed and no body is found. Written on the inside of the coffin in Audrey's handwriting is a message, "find him before The Hunter". In Real Estate, Audrey experiences a flashback in which she learns that Lucy had worked with The Colorado Kid and that his first name is James. Audrey matches the name with the facial composite and a police search reveals that his full name is James Cogan. In Magic Hour, Audrey learned in Colorado that Sarah (and thus, Lucy and Audrey) is James's mother and in Thanks for the Memories Nathan explains he is James's father.

Arla Cogan is his wife. Arla led James to believe that his mother had tried to kill him in 1983 and he hated her for it. His injuries were grave and survived only through the healing power of the barn. When he came out of the barn in the season 3 finale he starts to become sick. Returning to the barn he recovers. He explains that the only way to stop the Troubles is if Audrey kills someone she loves and he thinks that means him. He eventually learned that Audrey didn't try to hurt him. He disappears with the barn.

In season 5 episode "Just Passing Through", it is revealed that James' grandfather, Croatoan used his vessel Dave Teagues to kill him in order to gain more power to manifest in reality and used the ability to make those who were at Haven lose time before he left Dave and returned to the void. He later reveals to Audrey that he did that in order to prevent Lucy Ripley from killing James and end the troubles and therefore undoing all of Mara's work.

In Stephen King's book, The Colorado Kid, there is only the slightest hint of the supernatural. It features two old newspapermen, owner Vince Teagues and editor Dave Bowie of the Weekly Islander, who tell the story of an unsolved murder to a young journalist. The "constable" of Moose-Look at the time was George Wournos and there is a diner on the island called the "Grey Gull".
