= Northwest Passage (Fringe) =

- Fringe episode
- Peter and Sheriff Mathis (guest actor Martha Plimpton) autopsy a body
- Episode no.: Season 2 Episode 21
- Directed by: Joe Chappelle
- Written by: Ashley Edward Miller; Zack Stentz; Nora Zuckerman; Lilla Zuckerman
- Production code: 3X5120
- Original air date: May 6, 2010

Guest appearances
- Michael Cerveris as The Observer; Martha Plimpton as Sheriff Ann Mathis; Christine Chatelain as Krista Manning; Sebastian Roché as Thomas Jerome Newton; Patrick Gilmore as Deputy Bill Ferguson; Paul Herbert as Tom; Juan Riedinger as Craig Shoen

Episode chronology
← Previous "Brown Betty"	Next → "Over There (Part 1)"
- Fringe season 2

"Northwest Passage" is the 21st episode of the second season of the American science fiction drama television series Fringe, and the 41st episode overall. The episode follows Peter (Joshua Jackson) as he continues to stay away from Boston after learning his true parallel universe origins; his travels take him to a small town, where he helps the local police investigate mysterious disappearances.

The episode was written by Ashley Edward Miller, Zack Stentz, Nora Zuckerman, and Lilla Zuckerman. Joe Chappelle served as the episode director. It featured a guest appearance by actress Martha Plimpton. Pearl Jam guitarist Mike McCready helped write the music for the episode.

"Northwest Passage" first aired in the United States on May 6, 2010 to an estimated 5.82 million viewers. It received generally positive reviews, as many critics praised the writers' decision to focus on Peter in a new location. Others noted references to the television series Twin Peaks.

== Plot ==
After learning his true origins in "The Man from the Other Side", Peter (Joshua Jackson) leaves Boston and travels to a small town in the state of Washington. At a diner, Peter makes plans for a date with a local woman named Krista, but before they can meet she is kidnapped and murdered. Initially, the police suspects Peter is involved in the disappearance until told he was at his hotel all night. Peter decides to aid them in the investigation after catching a glimpse of Thomas Jerome Newton (Sebastian Roché), believing the shapeshifters are responsible and are coming after him; however, he does not wish Walter to be involved, asking Agent Broyles (Lance Reddick) to keep his location secret.

During the autopsy, Peter explains to Sheriff Mathis (Martha Plimpton) how removing a part of a brain could provide information to the killers. Mathis' partner, deputy officer Bill Ferguson (Patrick Gilmore), soon disappears. After they go to the scene of Krista's murder, Peter encounters Newton, but he escapes. Peter becomes suspicious of Mathis when he sees blood on her jacket; however, he believes her when she shows him her cut from a fall, which is bleeding normal blood, not the mercury typical of shapeshifters; he then explains the concept of shapeshifters to her.

Peter begins to doubt the shapeshifters' motives after another body is found, but eventually comes up with an idea to read and track the victims' adrenaline spikes, which allows him to find where the murders took place: a dairy farm. They find the owner, who confesses to killing the women because they rejected him, and kidnapped and tortured Mathis's partner when he discovered the culprit. Repeatedly at the hotel, Peter receives calls with static, strange noises, and clicks, which he suspects are coming from Newton. In the end, Peter decides and prepares to head back to Boston, but is approached by Newton, who has brought "Mr. Secretary", the man from the Other Side, to see Peter. The man is revealed to be his actual father from the parallel universe, "Walternate".

Meanwhile, back in Boston, a distraught Walter (John Noble) suffers a small mental breakdown at a supermarket. Olivia (Anna Torv) and Astrid (Jasika Nicole) escort him home, discovering his house is in disarray. After they ask why he didn't come to them for help, Walter replies he needs to learn to care for himself if Peter fails to return. He discovers a way to find Peter using his unique energy signature, but changes his mind after worrying that Peter will not forgive him. However, Olivia learns Peter's whereabouts from Broyles; they prepare to fly to Washington.

== Production ==
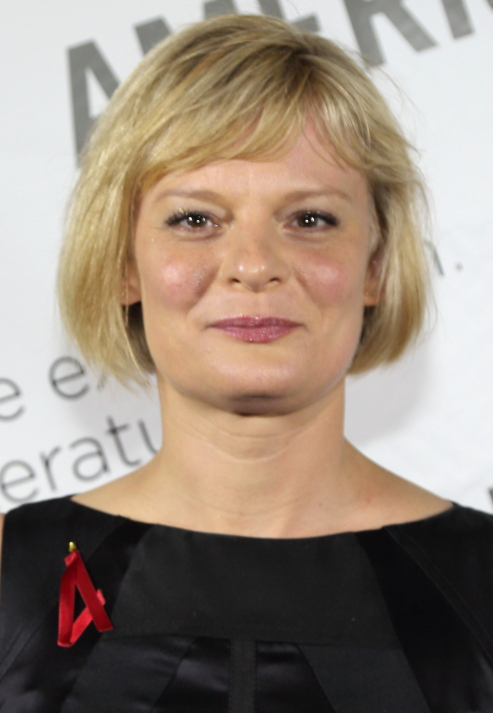
"Northwest Passage" featured a guest appearance by actress Martha Plimpton

"Northwest Passage" was co-written by producers Ashley Edward Miller, Zack Stentz, staff writers Lilla Zuckerman and Nora Zuckerman. Co-executive producer Joe Chappelle served as episode director.

Miller later noted that unlike other episode scenes such as in "Grey Matters", Walter's breakdown at the supermarket "came largely out of nowhere. It was a thought experiment that took on a life of its own." Miller continued that at the time, he and Stentz thought they were writing Olivia-focused episodes, but "In retrospect, we really wrote a four-part story about Walter, his relationship to children, and the struggle between Walter-who-was and Walter-who-is. If you look at it that way, his decision at the end of 'Northwest Passage' becomes the moment where he reconciles those things. He doesn't resolve them, but he comes to grips with them. Once again in retrospect, I think that's what the supermarket breakdown was really about. This happens — you think a scene is about one thing when you're in the middle of it, and realize it's something else entirely when you look back. Characters can be sneaky motherfuckers that way."

A fan of Fringe, Pearl Jam musician Mike McCready talked with series composer Chris Tilton about writing some music for "Northwest Passage". McCready said he started "throwing ideas back and forth. And I think they just wanted a northwest guy to do it, because they were shooting it in the northwest". He elaborated that "My role was smaller than someone who wrote all the music for it, but I think I was none the less integral in there. I mean, it was fun. Chris sent me his cues, and I just kind of rearranged them into guitar ideas".

The episode featured guest actress Martha Plimpton as Sheriff Tracy Mathis. On her role, she later commented "That episode turned out really well; I was really pleased with it, and where else but on Fringe would I get to play the sheriff of a small town?"

The crew shot an alternate ending in which Mathis questions Peter about his faith with the FBI. This was available on the DVD special features. As with other Fringe episodes, Fox released a science lesson plan for grade school children focusing on the science seen in "Northwest Passage", with the intention of having "students learn about the scientific method and how it can be used to collect data through experimentation and observation in order to formulate and test a hypothesis."

== Cultural references ==
Many critics noted the similarities between the episode and the David Lynch television series Twin Peaks, with one reviewer writing there was a "definite Peaks-y vibe to tonight's episode, from the setting—Noyo County, Washington, home of a diner with "famous pies"—to the off-kilter camera angles and hushed tone". Twin Peaks was originally titled "Northwest Passage" before its pilot, and both focused on solving a murder mystery in Washington state. Other reviewers felt the "Mulder/Scully"-like investigation and the line "You want to believe" was a homage to The X-Files.

A song by Leonard Cohen, "Anthem" is quoted in this episode. "Anthem" lyrics are: "There is a crack in everything/ That's how the light gets in." The Sheriff played by Martha Plimpton has a pen with "find the crack" printed on it, she states to Peter Bishop "that's how the light gets in."

== Reception ==
=== Ratings ===
The first airing of "Northwest Passage" was watched by an estimated 5.82 million viewers in the United States. It earned a 3.7/6 ratings share among all households and a 2.2/6 share among viewers 18–49. This was a ten percent jump from the previous week. SFScope writer Sarah Stegall speculated that the episode's "standalone mystery", combined with the recent Fringe season renewal, helped contribute to the ratings gain.

=== Reviews ===
The A.V. Club writer Noel Murray graded the episode with a B+, explaining "It was the atmosphere that sold me on "Northwest Passage", an episode with a fairly middling mystery and only minimal advancement of the master-plot. (Though the end-point of that advancement was a doozy, and has me eating a little crow.) At times tonight the show almost felt like a backdoor pilot for a new series, with Peter tooling around the Pacific Northwest meeting local law enforcement and cracking cases. And while that's a show I'd definitely watch, I confess I'm anxious to jump ahead to next week, when there'll be inter-dimensional conflict and doppelgangers galore". Murray considered the ending with the appearance of Walternate a "strong finish to a mostly strong episode". IGN's Ramsey Isler gave it 7.8/10, writing that "Fringe's sophomore season is building up to an epic 2-part finale. This episode doesn't reveal much in terms of overall Fringe mythology until the very awesome ending, and even then it just confirms what we already knew or suspected. Still, this installment deserves credit for using a different formula and giving Joshua Jackson some much-deserved time in the spotlight all by himself".

"Josh Jackson completely owned this episode. He so completely dominated it, so completely inhabited his character, that he nearly renders Walter Bishop superfluous. Yet this is all accomplished without negating any of the character development we have seen to date... If the plot had holes you could drive a starship through, the episode was still redeemed by top notch acting, the X-Files ambiance, and the new dimensions added to our knowledge of Peter. I can forgive lame plotting for the sake of excellent acting."

— SFScope writer Sarah Stegall

SFScope's Sarah Stegall praised the writers for showcasing Peter, believing Jackson gave "a solid, convincing performance that teaches us more about Peter than we learned in the first half of this season". She also was pleased with Peter's reactions to the obstacles thrown in his path, but criticized the writing for having another man behind the murders ('Too much coincidence. Way too much coincidence. From a plotting standpoint, it was clumsy'). Stegall concluded her review by praising all of the actors' performances, explaining that other than the "clumsy" killer plot twist, "I had no complaints at all about this episode. The supporting cast was top notch". Ken Tucker from Entertainment Weekly enjoyed how the episode mystery was processed from Peter's point of view, and loved the revelation at the end about Walternate. MTV columnist Josh Wigler praised the episode's "pretty mature storytelling" for not making Peter "go on an angry rampage" or become "an angsty ball of self-loathing" after the previous episode's events. He continued, "You can see that he's hurting, but he's still not quite sure how to process everything. Excellent work from the writers and Joshua Jackson".

After trying various science fiction shows after Lost, the Los Angeles Times' Andrew Hanson felt the episode made "him feel like [he] picked a winner". Like other critics, Hanson loved the twist ending, writing that "Fringe is making it more and more difficult for me to pick my favorite episode". Television Without Pity called Walternate's sudden appearance one of 2010's "Most Memorable TV Moments", explaining "We knew we'd meet him eventually, but the way they surprised us with him at the end of a stand-alone episode was a fitting introduction for such an ominous and shadowy character, and we knew even then that it marked a new and improved era for the show." At the time, TV Fanatic called "Northwest Passage" the best Fringe episode to date, giving the series' its first "five out of five stars".
