= Audrey Parker =

Audrey Parker may refer to:

- Audrey Parker (Haven), fictional character in Haven
- Audrey Parker-Nichols, fictional character in Drake & Josh
- Audrey Parker (The 4400), fictional character in The 4400
