= Agent Howard =

Agent Howard may refer to:

- Special Agent Fritz Howard, fictional character featured in the TNT programs The Closer and Major Crimes
- Agent Howard (Haven), fictional character in Haven
