= Frank Harts =

American actor (born 1979)

Frank Harts (born May 30, 1979) is an American film, television, and theatre actor. He played George Murchison in the 2004 Tony Award-winning Broadway revival of A Raisin in the Sun opposite Sean Combs, Audra McDonald, Phylicia Rashad, and Sanaa Lathan. Harts has played supporting roles in several films, including the film Home directed by Jono Oliver, which was nominated for an NAACP Image Award for Outstanding Directing in a Motion Picture in 2014. He played recurring character Deputy Dennis Luckey on the HBO series The Leftovers created by Damon Lindelof and Tom Perrotta. He also played recurring character Dale Christo on the Showtime series Billions. Harts is a graduate of The Juilliard School.

== Filmography ==
=== Film ===
Key
†	Denotes works that have not yet been released

Year	Title	Role	Director	Notes
2003	Bought & Sold	Oswaldo 'Papo' Rivera	Michael Tolajian	Also composer
2003	In the Cut	Frannie's Student	Jane Campion	
2006	Recalled	Sergeant Miles	Michael Connors	Short, also composer
2008	Gigantic	Kenyatta Folds	Matt Aselton	
2009	New Brooklyn	Eddie	Christopher Cannucciari	
2009	Windows Vista: Predator Edition	Darnell Hawkins	Paul Kamuf	Short
2010	Salt	Floor Secret Service Agent	Phillip Noyce	
2011	Happy New Year	Dex	K. Lorrel Manning	
2011	Certainty	Khakis	Peter Askin	
2012	The Ogre's Feathers	The Young Man	Phillip Noyce	Short
2013	Syrup	Business Man	Aram Rappaport	
2013	Home	Smitty	Jono Oliver	
2014	Jack Ryan: Shadow Recruit	City Worker	Kenneth Branagh	
2014	The Rewrite	Paramedic	Marc Lawrence	
2015	Experimenter	Washington	Michael Almereyda	Uncredited
2015	Keep in Touch	Officer Hackley	Sam Kretchmar	
2015	The Family Fang	Officer Dunham	Jason Bateman	
2016	Paterson	Luis	Jim Jarmusch	
2019	See You Yesterday	Officer Battle	Stefon Bristol	
2023	Rustin	James Farmer	George C. Wolfe	
TBA	Maybe There's a Tree †	Stanley Fink	Ashlin Halfnight	Completed

=== Television ===
Year	Title	Role	Notes
1998	Early Edition	Second Kid	Episode: "A Minor Miracle"
2005	Hope & Faith	Keith	2 episodes
2005	Law & Order	David Jacobson	Episode: "Obsession"
2006	Saturday Night Live	Diddy's voice	Episode: "Annette Bening/Gwen Stefani/Akon"
2007	Queens Supreme	Court Officer Harvey	Episode: "That Voodoo That You Do"
2008	Living in Captivity	Mike	TV movie
2008	It's Always Sunny in Philadelphia	Man on Street	Episode: "America's Next Top Paddy's Billboard Model Contest"
2009	U.S. Attorney	Federal Agent	TV movie
2009	Law & Order	Sergeant Rodney Jakes	Episode: "Crimebusters"
2011	Unforgettable	CSU Tech	Episode: "With Honor"
2013	30 Rock	Delivery Man	Episode: "Florida"
2014	The Americans	Raymond	Episode: "Arpanet"
2014	The Leftovers	Dennis Luckey	7 episodes
2015	The Blacklist	Court Officer	Episode: "Tom Keen (No. 7)"
2015	American Odyssey	Homeland Security Official #1	Episode: "Gingerbread"
2016	The Mysteries of Laura	Derry Donnigan	Episode: "The Mystery of the Morning Jog"
2016	Billions	Dale Christo	11 episodes
2016–2017	The Path	Agent Fredericks	9 episodes
2017	Blue Bloods	Arthur Cook	Episode: "Shadow of a Doubt"
2017	Master of None	Eddie	Episode: "New York, I Love You"
2018	Deception	Robert Greene	Episode: "Divination"
2018	Elementary	Eddy Dunbridge	Episode: "Give Me the Finger"
2018	Bull	ADA Madden	2 episodes
2019	The Code	Zach Aubrey	Episode: "Lioness"
2019–2021	Prodigal Son	JT Tarmel	Main role
