= Haven season 2 =

Haven
- Season 2
- Region 1 DVD cover
- Starring: Emily Rose; Lucas Bryant; Eric Balfour
- No. of episodes: 13

Release
- Original network: Syfy
- Original release: July 15 – December 6, 2011

Season chronology
- ← Previous; Season 1 Next → Season 3

The second season of the American television series Haven premiered on July 15, 2011, on Syfy. The season consisted of 13 episodes including a Christmas episode. The show stars Emily Rose, Lucas Bryant and Eric Balfour.

== Cast ==
=== Main cast ===
- Emily Rose as Audrey Parker / Sarah Vernon
- Lucas Bryant as Nathan Wuornos
- Eric Balfour as Duke Crocker

=== Recurring cast ===
- Richard Donat as Vince Teagues
- John Dunsworth as Dave Teagues
- Jason Priestley as Chris Brody
- Vinessa Antoine as Evidence "Evi" Ryan
- Kathleen Munroe as FBI Agent Audrey Parker
- Stephen McHattie as Ed Driscoll
- Adam Copeland (credited as WWE Superstar Edge) as Dwight Hendrickson

=== Guest stars ===
- Maurice Dean Wint as Agent Byron Howard
- Joe Dinicol as Peter Novelli
- Alexz Johnson as Moira Keegan
- Cristián de la Fuente as Cornell Stamoran
- Dylan Neal as Hugh Underwood
- Torrance Coombs as Kyle Hopkins
- Tahmoh Penikett as Simon Crocker
- Nicholas Campbell as Garland Wuornos

== Episodes ==
No. overall	No. in season	Title	Directed by	Written by	Original release date	US viewers (millions)
14	1	"A Tale of Two Audreys"	T. W. Peacocke	Sam Ernst & Jim Dunn	July 15, 2011	1.88
Audrey is confronted by a woman who claims she is also Audrey Parker, sharing her name and memories. At the same time the ten plagues of Exodus are visited on the people of Haven and the death of the firstborn sons is only averted through a children's story. Nathan is forced to lead the police department now that his father is gone.
15	2	"Fear & Loathing"	Rob Lieberman	Gabrielle Stanton	July 22, 2011	1.84
As Audrey struggles to make sense of the mystery of her own identity and the other Audrey Parker that's come to Haven, a terrifying epidemic begins to spread across town where the residents have their worst fears come to life. Nathan discovers that his own "trouble" has gone away and a children's puzzle which could destroy Haven is stolen.
16	3	"Love Machine"	T. W. Peacocke	Story by : Matt McGuinness; Teleplay by : Matt McGuinness & Nora Zuckerman & Lilla Zuckerman	July 29, 2011	2.00
When the Haven docks begin mysteriously lashing out and attacking people, Audrey and Nathan must figure out what's happening before more people are made victims. While they search for who or what is causing the chaos, the other Audrey Parker recruits Duke to help her investigate the clues to the mystery of Audrey's identity left behind by the imposter Agent Howard.
17	4	"Sparks and Recreation"	Lynne Stopkewich	Jonathan Abrahams	August 5, 2011	1.82
While investigating a deadly series of electrocutions that is occurring across town including one such event which kills Haven's extremely likable mayor, Audrey and Nathan meet a man who is skilled at keeping Haven's secret under wraps. Duke and Evi find a small empty box after Duke reluctantly accepts his ex-wife's help in finding a way to protect himself from the tattooed man.
18	5	"Roots"	Tim Southam	Jim Dunn	August 12, 2011	1.89
A wedding at an isolated estate becomes a lethal trap for everyone in attendance – including Audrey, Chris, Duke and Evi while something outside threatens to kill them all. Proceedings turn deadly for the guests when the body of the host is found.
19	6	"Audrey Parker's Day Off"	Fred Gerber	Nora Zuckerman & Lilla Zuckerman	August 19, 2011	1.74
Audrey is forced to realize that she is unable to avoid the same horrible day and the catastrophe that comes of it to her and her friends.
20	7	"The Tides That Bind"	Paolo Barzman	Gabrielle Stanton	August 26, 2011	1.91
While investigating a recent drowning, Audrey and Nathan come across an enigmatic and a dangerous community located on the outskirts of Haven where children are mysteriously disappearing and a dark secret is being protected. They soon uncover a decades-old supernatural mystery that implicates the Rev, Chief Wuornos, and even Lucy Ripley
21	8	"Friend or Faux"	Stephen Reynolds	Sam Ernst	September 2, 2011	1.46
Violent crimes are traced back to a mild-mannered banker, who seems to have spawned a darker, unhinged copy of himself who is bent on doing things the original won't do for himself. While trying to determine the copy's ultimate mission, Audrey, Nathan and Duke step into a deadly trap.
22	9	"Lockdown"	Jason Priestley	Nora Zuckerman & Lilla Zuckerman	September 9, 2011	1.91
After a terrifying infection takes down a police officer inside the police station, The new Chief that replaced Nathan seals the building shut to contain the outbreak with Audrey, Nathan, Chris, Duke and Evi trapped inside. Audrey and Nathan suspect that something other than an outbreak is at play – but their only aid on the outside is Dwight.
23	10	"Who, What, Where, Wendigo?"	Lee Rose	Jonathan Abrahams	September 16, 2011	2.02
A search party is put together by Audrey and Nathan after recruiting Dwight and The Teagues to locate a local teen who has gone missing in Haven's woods while a murderer is on the loose. But they find they are not alone when they run across the Rev and his own search party. And during their search, the group discovers evidence to support the existence of a supernatural creature.
24	11	"Business as Usual"	Shawn Piller	Matt McGuinness & Gabrielle Stanton	September 23, 2011	1.87
Audrey and Nathan investigate a series of murders in which the victim's bodies are mysteriously mummified. But the events swirling around Audrey in the wake of what happened with the Rev threaten to upend everything and cause a startling revelation about her past. Meanwhile, when he crosses paths with Dwight on a covert mission, Duke learns a shocking secret about his past which threatens to change the course of his future.
25	12	"Sins of the Fathers"	Lee Rose	Sam Ernst & Jim Dunn	September 30, 2011	1.80
The dead return to the world of the living in order to seek revenge and complete unfinished business, and the return of the otherworldly visitors forces Audrey, Nathan and Duke to confront their destinies in Haven.
26	13	"Silent Night"	Shawn Piller	Brian Millikin	December 6, 2011	1.20
Audrey begins seeing Christmas decorations mysteriously popping up all over Haven in the middle of July yet nobody else, including Nathan, seems to feel anything is unusual. Yet, when Haven residents start disappearing into thin air, Audrey convinces Nathan they must find a way to stop it.

== Production ==
On October 7, 2010, Syfy announced that Haven would begin production on a thirteen-episode second season to begin airing July 15, 2011. On March 22, 2011, SyFy announced that they would air a Christmas special of Haven during season two.

Jason Priestley directed the ninth episode and guest starred in a four-episode arc as Chris Brody, a handsome but anti-social marine biologist who is forced to deal with an affliction most would consider a blessing. Vinessa Antoine had a recurring role as Evidence "Evi" Ryan, a former con-artist and Duke's estranged wife.

Syfy premiered the season premiere at San Diego Comic Con during the network's screening panel two months prior to its premiere date.

Adam Copeland starred as Dwight Hendrickson, a shrewd longtime Haven resident and a former Army Ranger felled by a supernatural affliction in Afghanistan, who puts his tactical skills to use in Haven as the mysterious "Cleaner." Originally signed for a four episode guest role, Copeland was instead promoted to a full time cast member. Cristián de la Fuente also guest starred as Cornell, a straight-laced, conservative, mild-mannered banker, who is hiding a dark and shocking double life.

Season 2 also included the stand-alone Christmas episode "Silent Night" which was later included in the DVD/Blu-ray release as a bonus feature. However, that release omitted the Teagues' narration.

== Home media release ==
Haven: The Complete Second Season
Set details	Special features	
12 episodes; 4-disc set; 1.78:1 aspect ratio; Subtitles: English, Spanish, French (USA version not Including); English (Dolby Digital 5.1 Surround); English (Master Audio 5.1 Surround) – Blu-ray	Ten Audio commentaries with Cast & Crew*; "Silent Night" Christmas Episode; Six Exclusive Making-of Featurettes; Five Behind-the-Scenes Featurettes; Interview with Guest Star Adam Copeland; Haven Panel from New York Comic Con; (*PAL DVD states nine but there're ten commentaries like the NTSC one.)	
DVD release dates
Region 1	Region 2	Region 4
September 4, 2012	March 13, 2012	May 16, 2012
