= Prodigal Son (TV series) =

2019 American crime drama television series

- Genre: Crime drama; Procedural
- Created by: Chris Fedak; Sam Sklaver
- Starring: Tom Payne; Lou Diamond Phillips; Halston Sage; Aurora Perrineau; Frank Harts; Keiko Agena; Bellamy Young; Michael Sheen
- Composer: Nathaniel Blume
- Country of origin: United States
- Original language: English
- No. of seasons: 2
- No. of episodes: 33

Production
- Executive producers: Lee Toland Krieger; Sarah Schechter; Sam Sklaver; Chris Fedak; Greg Berlanti; Adam Kane
- Producers: Jennifer Lence; Jason Sokoloff; Eileen Jones; Jonathan Gabay
- Cinematography: Nigel Bluck; Anthony Wolberg; Benji Bakshi; Niels Alpert; Christopher Raymond
- Editors: Matt Barber; Avi Youabian; Luyen Vu; Nathan Draper; Jeff Asher; Hovig Menakian; Kim Powell; Trey Ordoñez; Rafael Garcia; Mike Oden Jackson
- Camera setup: Single-camera
- Running time: 43–46 minutes
- Production companies: Berlanti Productions; Sklaverworth Productions; VHPT! Co.; Warner Bros. Television; Fox Entertainment

Original release
- Network: Fox
- Release: September 23, 2019 – May 18, 2021

Prodigal Son is an American procedural drama television series created by Chris Fedak and Sam Sklaver for the Fox Broadcasting Company that premiered on September 23, 2019, and concluded on May 18, 2021. In October 2019, the series was picked up for a full season. In May 2020, the series was renewed for a second season which premiered on January 12, 2021. In May 2021, the series was canceled after two seasons.

== Premise ==
The series centers on Malcolm Bright whose father Martin Whitly is an infamous serial killer known as "the Surgeon". Malcolm discovered what his father was doing when still a child and alerted the police, who finally caught Martin. By the time of the show, Malcolm has cut all ties with his father, changed his name, and has not seen him for ten years. Previously an FBI profiler and now working for the NYPD, Malcolm is forced to confront his father when a copycat serial killer emerges. He must use Martin's insights to help solve horrible crimes while handling inner battles. He must also deal with his father constantly trying to insert himself back into Malcolm's life. He is helped by Gil, an NYPD lieutenant and father figure, and the officer who responded to Malcolm's call all those years ago.

== Cast ==
=== Main ===
- Tom Payne as Malcolm Bright (né Whitly), a disgraced former FBI profiler who works for the NYPD. He possesses the unique ability to view crimes from the perspective of the killer, allowing him to pick up on things that other cops might miss. This gift haunts him, causing him to live in a perpetual state of fear that he will one day succumb to the same sociopathic tendencies as his father.
  - Kasjan Wilson as young Malcolm
- Lou Diamond Phillips as Gil Arroyo, a lieutenant with Major Crimes in the NYPD. He was the arresting officer of Martin Whitly and, since then, has acted as a surrogate father to his son, Malcolm; Gil hires Malcolm as his new consultant after the latter is fired from the FBI.
- Halston Sage as Ainsley Whitly, Malcolm's ambitious younger sister; a TV news reporter.
- Aurora Perrineau as Dani Powell, a police detective under Arroyo's command who is sympathetic to Malcolm's difficulties
- Frank Harts as JT Tarmel, a detective under Arroyo's command
- Keiko Agena as Edrisa Tanaka, an NYC medical examiner with a romantic interest in Malcolm
- Bellamy Young as Jessica Whitly (née Milton), Malcolm's mother and a businesswoman from an old money high society family, who suffers from alcoholism as a result of her drinking to cope with her husband's crimes
- Michael Sheen as Martin Whitly, Malcolm's father, a renowned cardiothoracic surgeon, who is incarcerated in an asylum after committing 23 murders as "the Surgeon"

=== Recurring ===
- Esau Pritchett as Mr. David, a worker at the Claremont Psychiatric Hospital who is in charge of Dr. Whitly
- Charlayne Woodard as Gabrielle Le Deux (season 1), Malcolm's psychologist since his father's arrest
- Molly Griggs as Eve Blanchard (season 1), Malcolm's girlfriend who is the sister of one of Martin's victims. Eve is a lawyer who has an interest in fighting human trafficking
- Dermot Mulroney as Nicholas Endicott (season 1), a pharmaceutical tycoon who has a secret association with Dr. Whitly
- Armando Acevedo as Hector
- Alan Gary as Burt
- Christian Borle as Friar Pete (season 2), a new patient at the Claremont Psychiatric Hospital
- Catherine Zeta-Jones as Vivian Capshaw (season 2), a resident medical doctor at the Claremont Psychiatric Hospital

== Production ==
=== Development ===
On January 28, 2019, it was announced that Fox had given the production a pilot order. The pilot was written by Chris Fedak and Sam Sklaver, who executive produces alongside Lee Toland Krieger, Greg Berlanti and Sarah Schechter. Production companies involved with the pilot include Berlanti Productions and Warner Bros. Television. On March 12, 2019, it was announced that Lee Toland Krieger would be directing the series. On May 9, 2019, it was announced that the production had been given a series order. The following day, it was announced that the series would premiere in the Fall of 2019. The series debuted on September 23, 2019. On October 7, 2019, the series was picked up for a full season of 22 episodes. In March 2020, Warner Bros. Television suspended production on the series upon the outbreak of the COVID-19 pandemic. As a result, episode 20 served as the first season finale.

On May 21, 2020, Fox renewed the series for a second season which premiered on January 12, 2021. On May 10, 2021, Fox canceled the series after two seasons.

=== Casting ===
In February 2019, it was announced that Lou Diamond Phillips, Aurora Perrineau and Frank Harts had been cast in the pilot's lead roles. Alongside the pilot's order announcement, in March 2019, it was reported that Michael Sheen, Bellamy Young, Finn Jones, Keiko Agena and Halston Sage had joined the cast. Four days later, on March 12, 2019, it was announced that Tom Payne would replace Jones in the starring role of Malcolm Bright, during first table readings. On February 10, 2020, Dermot Mulroney was cast in a recurring role. On December 7, 2020, Christian Borle and Michael Potts joined the cast in recurring capacities for the second season. On January 6, 2021, Catherine Zeta-Jones joined the cast for the second half of the season.

== Episodes ==
=== Series overview ===
Season	Episodes	Originally released		Rank	Average viewership (in millions)
Season	Episodes	First released	Last released	Rank	Average viewership (in millions)
1	20	September 23, 2019	April 27, 2020	62	5.83
2	13	January 12, 2021	May 18, 2021	73	4.04

=== Season 1 (2019–20) ===
No. overall	No. in season	Title	Directed by	Written by	Original release date	Prod. code	U.S. viewers (millions)
1	1	"Pilot"	Lee Toland Krieger	Chris Fedak & Sam Sklaver	September 23, 2019	T88.01001	4.05
Fired from the FBI for insubordination and antagonizing his colleagues, Malcolm Bright is hired as a consultant by his old friend, NYPD lieutenant Gil Arroyo. On his first case, Malcolm discovers similarities between the killer and his father, Martin Whitly, an incarcerated serial killer known as "The Surgeon". This causes him to suffer night terrors and panic attacks as he finds himself reliving the events leading up to his father's arrest. Against the advice of Gil and his long-suffering mother Jessica, Malcolm visits his father for the first time in ten years for help identifying the killer, whom he determines was one of his patients. Faced with the threat of his son abandoning him for good, Dr. Whitly names the killer as wealthy developer Carter Berkhead. Berkhead takes his wife and a cop, Detective Dani Powell, hostage and an overwhelmed Malcolm offers to trade his life for theirs, distracting Berkhead long enough for Gil to shoot him. Afterwards, Gil tells his officers the truth of Malcolm's identity and asks them to have faith in him.
2	2	"Annihilator"	Adam Kane	Chris Fedak & Sam Sklaver	September 30, 2019	T88.10102	3.90
Gil invites Malcolm to consult on a new case involving the poisoning of several family members; snakes found in the body of the dead patriarch point to an estranged son who tries to kill Malcolm with snake venom, triggering a new memory of Dr. Whitly using chloroform on his son when he discovers an unconscious woman in a locked box. Ainsley discovers that her brother has been visiting their father. Malcolm goes to see Dr. Whitly and warns him that he will uncover the truth behind his missing memories. When the suspect is reported dead from suicide, Gil gives his team a few hours to prove Malcolm's theory that he was framed. Malcolm and Dani visit the family lawyer, who admits that he was an illegitimate child rejected by the patriarch and so took revenge by killing his family. He then poisons himself and his wife and daughters, but the police are able to reverse the poisonings. Dani takes an inebriated Malcolm home that night and helps him into bed. Dr. Whitly's guard at the asylum secretly contacts Jessica, revealing that she has been keeping tabs on her son's visits.
3	3	"Fear Response"	Rob Bailey	Lisa Randolph	October 7, 2019	T88.10103	3.66
A murder leads Malcolm and the team to Elaine Brown, one of Malcolm's idols and a premier expert in the science of fear. Based on letters recovered from the victim's body, as well as evidence the man's brain was removed after his death, Malcolm suspects that the killer may be a disgruntled former test subject of Brown's. JT discovers that Brown was illegally dosing her students with LSD, resulting in a suicide that she covered up. Jessica becomes concerned that her son's visits with Dr. Whitly are further damaging his fragile mind; she asks Gil to intervene, but he refuses as he feels Malcolm should make his own choices. Brown identifies the suspect just as Malcolm realizes that the murders are aimed at wiping out everyone involved with her research. While on stakeout, the killer breaks into Brown's house and drugs her before she shoots him dead; Malcolm convinces her to surrender to the police. Jessica pays a visit to her husband to tell him to stop seeing their son; he takes the opportunity to try and manipulate her. Malcolm intentionally doses himself with chloroform to try and fill the gap in his memories.
4	4	"Designer Complicity"	Leon Ichaso	Wendy Calhoun	October 14, 2019	T88.10104	3.18
Jessica gets Malcolm's name removed from Dr. Whitly's visitation list. A social media influencer is murdered in a manner that Malcolm identifies as likely being the work of a stalker. Accompanied by JT, he picks up Roger, a photographer who has been following the victim for some time, but refuses to reveal evidence that the police believe he possesses out of fear. After the real killer tries to run him over, Malcolm tricks Roger into thinking he's about to die, causing him to hand over the evidence. This points the team towards Axel X, a designer and the victim's former boyfriend who Malcolm realizes is the actual target. Without a warrant to justify taking action, Malcolm seeks out Axel on his own and gets him to give up the killer: his bodyguard Joey. Joey prepares to kill him, but the police spring a trap at the last second, using a wire Malcolm was wearing to take down both Axel and Joey. Gil provides Malcolm with a recording of his mother's interview following his father's arrest; it is revealed Jessica had no knowledge of the murders but instead thought the suspicious behavior was because Martin was having an affair with another woman. Ainsley makes a surprise visit to Dr. Whitly's cell to speak to him.
5	5	"The Trip"	Omar Madha	Jeremy Carver	October 21, 2019	T88.10105	3.34
Unable to sleep, Malcolm forces Gil to put him on the case of a murdered drug dealer; his insistence that the murder was motivated by revenge rather than business sets him against Dani, who becomes irritated by his attempts to profile her relationship to the case. Gil locates a potential suspect, a dealer who Dani insists is the killer. Defying orders, she goes to see him with Malcolm in tow. A shootout occurs and Malcolm is exposed to hallucinogenic drugs; Dani takes him home and puts him to sleep. Jessica meets Eve Blanchard, an attorney who suggests that she invest her family's money in her work fighting human trafficking. Malcolm has a dream involving his own mind, represented as himself in his father's clothes, and tries to find an old box of photos from his childhood to get answers. Dani then reveals that the dealer saved her life three years ago while she was working undercover. They locate the dealer, save him from the killer (a woman seeking revenge for her daughter's death), and fake his murder so he can start over. Jessica gives her son the box, and he finds an old picture of them camping in the woods with a station wagon that provides a new clue into his lost memories.
6	6	"All Souls and Sadists"	Megan Griffiths	Justin W. Lo	October 28, 2019	T88.10106	3.39
A man is stabbed over a hundred times to death in a park; Malcolm finds himself drawn to the victim's young son Isaac, who reminds him of himself when his father was arrested. His profile suggests that the killer is a sadist and he correctly infers that the boy's mother is a "Jocasta", a woman with an unhealthy dependence on her son's companionship. Both Jessica and Malcolm are against Ainsley's plan to interview Dr. Whitly and Jessica forbids her to do so. Dani and JT catch the mother trying to dig up evidence from the crime scene and take her into custody, whereupon she instantly confesses to the murder. Distraught that his profile might have been wrong, Malcolm visits his therapist Gabrielle, who prompts him to realize that he has blinded himself to the possibility that Isaac is the real killer. His suspicions are confirmed by the mother and the police race to catch Isaac, who has attacked another man. Malcolm talks him into voluntarily submitting to psychiatric treatment. Ainsley tells her mother that she'll find a way to conduct the interview. Malcolm finally finds the station wagon he's been searching for throughout the episode and discovers traces of blood covering the inside of the trunk.
7	7	"Q&A"	Adam Kane	Elizabeth Peterson	November 4, 2019	T88.10107	3.13
Malcolm is inspecting the station wagon in the junkyard when an unknown man shoots at him. Police find several bodies in the junkyard the next day, indicating the presence of a serial killer. Believing his father may know the killer, Malcolm visits him while Ainsley is conducting her interview. Another patient, Tevin, escapes and stabs his therapist, forcing a lockdown. He manages to break into the secure wing and stab Ainsley's cameraman/boyfriend Jin in the chest before a guard can lock Tevin out. With Jin bleeding to death and medics too far away, Malcolm attempts emergency surgery but is overcome with a new childhood memory of Martin seemingly guiding him to kill someone with a knife on their camping trip. Malcolm cannot continue due to his tremor so, with no other options, the guard uncuffs Martin so he can perform the procedure. Ainsley insists on filming the surgery while Malcolm takes Jin's spare camera, finds Tevin, and subdues him with Mr. David's taser. Martin saves Jin and Ainsley thanks him. However, Tevin confesses that Martin manipulated him into attacking Jin, landing Martin in solitary confinement. At Jessica's apartment, Malcolm receives a call from the serial killer, who taunts him about the camping trip, saying he was there and that he knows what happened.
8	8	"Family Friend"	Rob Hardy	Wyatt Cain	November 11, 2019	T88.10108	3.30
The police dub the new suspect the "Junkyard Killer". Interpreting the man's MO as that of a "righteous" killer, Malcolm searches the scrapyard and finds another victim, Ryan, buried alive in a makeshift underground cell. Enraged, the killer contacts Malcolm again, demanding to know how he figured it out. When the killer mentions the girl in the box, Malcolm's judgment is clouded and winds up leading him into a trap where he becomes injured. The killer gives him a phone and tells him to meet at a certain location if he wants to save a kidnapped priest. With Gil's help, they are able to save the priest, but Malcolm realizes it was a diversion: the killer was never there and instead went to the hospital to murder Ryan in his bed. Ainsley spots him and manages to hide before cops arrive. Jin, having woken up from surgery, breaks up with Ainsley out of disgust when he discovers she had filmed his surgery and was planning to air it. Jessica tells her son that, against his advice, she will leave her house while the Junkyard Killer is at large. Gil informs Malcolm that the FBI is taking over and that Malcolm has been removed from the case.
9	9	"Pied-A-Terre"	Antonio Negret	Lauriel Harte Marger	November 25, 2019	T88.10109	3.04
Malcolm asks Eve out on a date. A man is found murdered in Beth Saverstein's apartment but the victim turns out not to be her husband. Rather, he is one of several partners Beth has been having an affair with as part of an adulterous club run by Jasper St. George. Malcolm poses as a new client and meets Jasper's partner Simone. When questioned, she implies Beth's husband knows something. Malcolm speaks to him and learns that Beth and the victim may have been in love, a direct violation of the club's rules. While out on their date, Eve asks Malcolm to profile her; his answers visually upset her and she leaves. The team finds Jasper dead in his apartment and Simone abducted. Malcolm takes them back to Beth's apartment, explaining that she committed the murders out of anger for the victim rejecting her love and her fear of being caught. Beth surrenders when Malcolm appeals to what is left of the goodness in her heart. Gil tells Jessica about the girl in the box. Eve visits Malcolm and they have sex; that night, he has a hallucination and violently swings a knife at what he is seeing and nearly kills Eve. He desperately apologizes as Eve lays stunned on the floor.
10	10	"Silent Night"	Valerie Weiss	Sabrina Deana-Roga	December 2, 2019	T88.10110	3.35
Ainsley's interview airing brings up trauma in Malcolm as he watches it, and Eve has yet to contact him after what happened. NYPD chief of detectives Turner is murdered; the case forces Malcolm to cross paths with alcoholic ex-cop Owen Shannon, who oversaw Dr. Whitly's case and treated Malcolm more like a suspect than a witness. Shannon confronts Malcolm, claiming that he was unfairly dismissed from the force for insisting that there was another killer helping his father but ends up deciding to help Malcolm as they share some of the same reservations. Gil and the rest of the team are left to deal with the FBI, led by profiler Colette Swanson. Swanson has a low opinion of Malcolm and tries to convince Dani to spy on him for her. As she prepares for Christmas, Jessica becomes increasingly agitated by the attention being directed at her ex-husband and decides to announce a reward for any new leads on the girl in the box. Shannon and Malcolm find Turner's secret office, where they realize that he also shared Shannon's concerns and wanted to prove he was right. The two deduce the killer's real name, John Watkins, and visit his grandmother for information. John cuts Shannon's throat, knocks Malcolm unconscious, and escapes with him before the team can arrive.
11	11	"Alone Time"	Adam Kane	Nora Zuckerman & Lilla Zuckerman	January 20, 2020	T88.10111	3.07
Malcolm wakes up and finds himself chained in the cellar of a building. Watkins appears and the two of them begin to play mind games with each other, with Malcolm attempting to profile him. As Malcolm tries to get more information about the girl and the camping trip, Watkins reveals that Malcolm stabbed him all those years ago. Watkins ends up stabbing Malcolm and later reveals that his father brought him on that trip to kill him but was unable to follow through. The NYPD and FBI work to locate Malcolm. Gil talks to both Jessica and Martin, resulting in a tense stand-off before Gil reveals to Martin that Watkins has taken Malcolm. Martin has a breakdown and insists that Malcolm is dead. Watkins tells Malcolm that, just like Martin, his love for his family is his weakness; he reveals he plans to kill Jessica and Ainsley. Malcolm realizes that the rumbling he has been hearing is not a river, as he originally thought, but the subway and that Watkins brought him to Jessica's home. Watkins goes up and attacks Jessica and Ainsley, who both fight back. Malcolm uses a hammer to crush his hand, freeing himself, and rushes to save his family.
12	12	"Internal Affairs"	David Tuttman	Lisa Randolph & Alexis Siegel	January 27, 2020	T88.10112	3.15
An "incident" leads to Malcolm being forced by the department to undergo a mental fitness evaluation with psychiatrist Simon Coppenrach. As the interview unfolds, Malcolm explains how he defied Gil's instructions by inserting himself into the case of Tristan Johnston, a man with ties to a specialist running a cult-like institute that claims to cure trauma through electroconvulsive therapy (ECT). Malcolm enters the institute seeking help with his condition and meets Andi, a fellow patient who was recruited to the institute by Tristan. After being subjected to ECT, Malcolm convinces Andi to escape with him. Before they can get to the police, Andi is abducted. The specialist claims that she was kidnapped by a deprogrammer but, when a suspect is identified, Malcolm believes that he is not the real culprit. Gil and Malcolm have an argument, which then triggers the incident, Malcolm starting up the ECT machine he stole from the institute and seemingly shocking himself. Coppenrach declares him unfit to work, but Malcolm reveals that the evaluation was a trap: right before shocking himself, he instead discovered evidence that tied Coppenrach to the kidnapper. As the doctor is subdued and arrested, Andi is rescued from captivity. Gil checks in with Malcolm; Malcolm admits he does not know what he would have done with the machine and they reconcile. He orders Malcolm to take an extended vacation before he can return to active duty.
13	13	"Wait & Hope"	Glen Winter	Sam Sklaver	February 3, 2020	T88.10113	3.53
Malcolm's planned vacation is interrupted when, on the way to the airport, he convinces Gil to briefly consult on an attorney's murder and ends up throwing himself out a window to escape a landmine. The MO points towards a killer obsessed with The Count of Monte Cristo who is inflicting various types of poetic justice on a series of men linked to the wealthy Taylor family. The team discovers that their only son, Cal Taylor, was involved in the apparent death of a woman named Isabella, which his father had covered up. Gil and Malcolm go to the Taylor estate and catch Ernesto, Isabella's father, but Malcolm is convinced that he was not responsible. Shut out of the investigation as Gil insists it is closed, he pays a secret visit to his father with Dani, who advises him to focus on Cal as a suspect. With Dani posing as a guest, Malcolm crashes the Taylor wedding and distracts the guests with an awkward speech about fathers, in which he exposes the senior Taylor's crimes. Isabella, the killer who had survived her "death", tries to shoot him, but misses and Dani takes her into custody. Malcolm assures the father he will answer for his involvement as well. Dr. Whitly eagerly watches Ainsley's coverage of the story, believing that he has finally made a connection with his son.
14	14	"Eye of the Needle"	Lisa Robinson	Wyatt Cain	February 10, 2020	T88.10114	3.09
Jessica is contacted by a man who claims to know about the girl in the box but, when she goes to meet him, a body turns up. The killer, keeping his identity secret, calls Ainsley during her first day as a studio anchorwoman and publicly demands that Jessica pay him $1 million not to kill a second victim. Dr. Whitly takes the opportunity to also call in to Ainsley's program and offer his insight that the killer is motivated by a personal grudge against him. Jessica prepares the ransom against Gil's advice and the killer humiliates her by making her dump it on the street while killing the second victim anyway. Malcolm suspects that the killer despises the entire Whitly family and decides that he needs to speak to his father. Jessica shows up, as well, and reveals the killer wants her to murder her husband to save another hostage. At a sudden loud, shouting order from Martin, Malcolm seemingly shuts down and obeys his father, stabbing him while specifically aiming not to fatally pierce Dr. Whitly's heart, as was spoken about in flashback throughout the episode. He and the team intercept the killer, the husband of a patient who died on Dr. Whitly's table, and save the hostage. However, Malcolm refuses to tell Gil exactly what happened, as Martin's fate remains unknown.
15	15	"Death's Door"	Adam Kane	Elizabeth Peterson	February 17, 2020	T88.10115	3.33
As Dr. Whitly lies in a medically-induced coma, Jessica tells her son she's willing to accept responsibility for the attempted murder. Malcolm is then sent to help investigate a mysterious case involving a perfectly embalmed corpse, which he determines was the work of a necrophiliac. With help from the victim's ex-business partner, Tilda Carp, they are able to identify a suspect: Leanne Triutt, a disgraced former morgue worker. Jessica is contacted by Dr. Whitly's sleazy former lawyer, Sterling, who offers to get the charges against her dismissed; on the advice of Ainsley, she instead chooses to reach out to Eve, who agrees to defend her. Malcolm finds himself unwilling to visit his father and argues with both Dani and his sister about it. Leanne breaks into the precinct and holds Edrisa at gunpoint, demanding the victim's body. Malcolm distracts her while Edrisa knocks her down with a metal tray just before backup arrives. Inspired by Leanne's words, Malcolm decides to go see Dr. Whitly, who has been haunted by a nightmare of the girl in the box throughout the episode. He realizes that he regrets none of his crimes and vows to reunite with his family, waking to see Malcolm standing by his bedside.
16	16	"The Job"	Satya Bhabha	Justin W. Lo	March 16, 2020	T88.10116	3.28
Malcolm's old friend Vijay, an insurance investigator, joins a case to hunt down the gang behind a series of high-end robberies which left one woman dead and another in critical condition. Based on this information, Malcolm determines that one of the thieves is a thrill killer who derives satisfaction and pleasure from murder. Dr. Whitly blackmails Jessica and Malcolm, demanding that Malcolm visit him twice every ten days or he will refuse to lie to the police to protect them both. To try and take his mind off things, Jessica forces her son to finally talk to Eve, and Malcolm invites her to dinner. Malcolm confesses to her that he is continually haunted by the girl in the box. Vijay is acting suspicious and Malcolm suspects he's made a secret deal with the gang to buy back the stolen goods. Malcolm follows him and then convinces the gang that he's an appraiser. He uses the opportunity to study them until his cover is blown and Vijay is sent away while the gang decides what to do with Malcolm. Using his profiling skills, he invokes such paranoia and fear in the gang members that they shoot at each other. Malcolm is knocked unconscious and hallucinates his father, who tells him he's done well as Malcolm insists they aren't the same. Martin convinces him to wake up, as not all of the gang are dead. Another brief face-off happens, interrupted when Vijay shows up and runs down the killer with his car just before Gil and Dani arrive. Eve offers to help Jessica find the girl in the box, but appears to be keeping a secret from her and Malcolm.
17	17	"Stranger Beside You"	Pamela Romanowsky	Lauriel Harte Marger & Sabrina Deana-Roga	March 23, 2020	T88.10117	3.45
Malcolm asks Ainsley to look into Eve's past. He and the team are put on the case of a prominent mommy blogger, Alessa, whose husband was murdered shortly after their daughter Nina's birth. Malcolm recognizes that the murder was committed by someone with a "depraved heart", meaning Nina is the motive. Ainsley visits Jessica with a revelation: Eve is related to the girl in the box. Malcolm speaks to Dr. Whitly, where together they deduce Nina's mother is diabetic and would have been a high-risk pregnancy, which she never showed in her blogging. It turns out the pregnancy was faked and Nina's real mother is the family nanny, Christine. Jessica and Ainsley visit Malcolm at the same time Eve comes by to explain herself; she reveals that the girl in the box was her sister, then leaves. Deeply struggling with his emotions, Malcolm puts his full focus on the case. He learns from Christine that her abusive ex-husband is Nina's father and determined to take her back, so he sets a trap that backfires and nearly gets him killed before Alessa saves him. Christine agrees to let Nina be formally adopted by Alessa. Malcolm convinces Eve that they need to deal with her sister to save their relationship. Eve shows him a picture and he finally sees the girl's face in his mind.
18	18	"Scheherazade"	Dermott Downs	Nora Zuckerman & Lilla Zuckerman	March 30, 2020	T88.10118	3.47
After some self-reflection, Malcolm decides to take Eve to visit Dr. Whitly as part of a strategy to manipulate him into confessing his part in her sister Sophie Sanders' death, which ends with her slapping him and Martin warning them both to stay away from this for all their safeties. A ballet dancer who defected from Cuba is poisoned while performing at a party hosted by wealthy socialite Nicholas Endicott. Gil displays signs of jealousy when he discovers Endicott has been romancing Jessica. The team investigates the dancer's ballet company and learns that the victim fled from Cuba after his mentor was arrested for poisoning several other dancers. Dr. Whitly spends several hours gathering his thoughts and contacts Eve for another visit. Malcolm forms a theory that the mentor, presumed dead while trying to escape Cuba, is still alive; he turns out to be posing as a stagehand and killed his pupil out of fear that he would talk. They realize the killer is listening in and Gil saves Malcolm from being crushed by the mentor dropping stage lights on them. Downstairs, the killer is arrested. Malcolm returns to his father with Eve in tow and learns the truth: Dr. Whitly spared her sister's life after she gave him the name and secret details of a powerful man who wanted her dead. Eve departs to find her sister and tells Malcolm to stay out of it, leaving him heartbroken at the fact that she used him. Unbeknownst to both of them, in a final flashback, it's revealed Dr. Whitly chose not to name the man: Nicholas Endicott.
19	19	"The Professionals"	Lily Mariye	Lisa Randolph	April 20, 2020	T88.10121	3.33
Two weeks after last hearing from Eve, telling him not to worry or look for her, Malcolm receives word that Eve is dead, seemingly from suicide. After conferring with Edrisa, who's being pressured to close the case by Endicott's people, Malcolm realizes she would never have killed herself after finally finding her sister. He convinces Gil that she was murdered and that he needs to be on the case. Jessica and Malcolm go to Martin to demand answers and find Ainsley already there. Martin reveals that Endicott is indeed responsible for having Eve killed, which horrifies Jessica. Ainsley decides to expose Endicott for who he is, much to Martin's dismay, but it turns out he's aware of her plans and makes it clear that he can help advance her career, so long as she drops her investigation. A contract killer who Malcolm thinks is the culprit turns out to be innocent, but advises him that staging a suicide is a complicated operation requiring personal knowledge of the victim's life. By searching Eve's apartment and finding peep holes everywhere from an above apartment, JT and Malcolm find video evidence that leads them to the assassin, Martin's new guard Eddie, who is strangling Martin in his cell. After Malcolm cries out, calling him "Dad" for the first time, Martin finds the strength to overpower his attacker and gouges his eyes out. Later, still traumatized by Eve's death, he storms out of the precinct to confront Eddie at the hospital while Dani watches. Gil visits Jessica and they share a drink before Jessica confesses that she always loved Gil, but felt she could never be good enough for him; they kiss. Malcolm is plagued by haunting visions of Eve as he drinks heavily at home. His door is then knocked down by SWAT as his team enters, letting him know Eddie was murdered at the hospital with Malcolm's DNA everywhere. Malcolm is then arrested for the murder.
20	20	"Like Father..."	Adam Kane	Chris Fedak & Sam Sklaver and Elizabeth Peterson	April 27, 2020	T88.10122	3.38
Malcolm is bailed out by Jessica and immediately asks to be put on the case, but is instead confined to his mother's house with an ankle monitor. After managing to hack it and escape, he meets up with Edrisa and the two of them deduce that the crime lab that processed Eddie's body is dirty and planted false evidence. Endicott arranges for Dr. Whitly to be transferred to Riker's, where a bounty is placed on his head. Malcolm and Ainsley visit their father to try to get him to reveal what he has on Endicott, but it turns out he never had anything and it was a bluff. Gil informs Malcolm that he is going to be officially charged and tells him to leave town and wait for further orders. Malcolm finds Eve's sister Sophie, who is working as a veterinarian, and explains how he knows that she was the one who killed Eddie. However, he decides to take the blame instead, overwhelmed with guilt for not being able to save her, even as a child. Gil goes to Endicott's house to retrieve Jessica, who winds up saving his life when Endicott has him stabbed. Endicott then takes Ainsley prisoner and lures Malcolm back to his mother's house. Malcolm threatens Endicott with a gun; when Endicott mockingly says he'll never be prosecuted, and Malcolm finds he can't shoot despite it all, Ainsley suddenly slits his throat and stabs him multiple times, killing him. She asks what happened, revealing she has no idea what she's just done, just as Dr. Whitly contacts his children, revealing he has a plan to stay alive.

=== Season 2 (2021) ===
No. overall	No. in season	Title	Directed by	Written by	Original release date	Prod. code	U.S. viewers (millions)
21	1	"It's All in the Execution"	Antonio Negret	Chris Fedak & Sam Sklaver	January 12, 2021	T88.10201	2.34
Several months have passed since Endicott's death, which Malcolm covered up by disposing of the body in Estonia, a decision that has haunted him since. As the team, currently headed by JT as Gil recovers, arrests a serial killer, Malcolm learns that his father is being transferred back to Claremont as a reward for helping Riker's deal with COVID-19. The team handles a new case involving a woman being decapitated by a guillotine and her boyfriend being bricked inside a room alive; Malcolm deduces that the couple killed the woman's husband and let an innocent Hispanic youth be executed for it, so now the executioner is extracting justice. JT announces a false arrest to lure out the executioner, who goes after Malcolm; Malcolm overpowers him as Dani arrives to arrest him. As JT walks into the alleyway towards Malcolm's apartment, he's assaulted by a cop who believes he's the killer. Malcolm and Dani save him before he gets shot. Afterwards, Malcolm visits Martin, who tells him to be proud of himself for protecting his sister. He tells Malcolm that, deep down, there's a possibility he enjoyed disposing of Endicott's corpse.
22	2	"Speak of the Devil"	Antonio Negret	Eileen Jones	January 19, 2021	T88.10202	2.37
The team investigates the ritualistic murder of a priest. Discovering that the victim was an exorcist, Malcolm determines that the killer believes themselves to be possessed by a demon. After determining that the priest's last patient lacks the self-control necessary to commit the murder, he consults with Martin, who in turn consults with Friar Pete, another patient at Claremont. The killer is eventually revealed to be an art restorer working at the victim's church, driven mad by lead poisoning from the painting he was fixing. With Friar Pete's help, Malcolm subdues the man by reciting the words for an exorcism. Meanwhile, JT worries he'll face harassment from other officers following his encounter with the racist cops, which proves to be true when he calls for backup, only to be ignored. Jessica ends her relationship with Gil out of fear that he'll risk his life unnecessarily to protect her. Martin and Pete begin plotting to escape the hospital as Martin believes his son needs him.
23	3	"Alma Mater"	Omar Madha	Lisa Randolph	January 26, 2021	T88.10203	2.18
A murder at Remington Academy, a prestigious boarding school where Malcolm was expelled in his teens, causes him to relive painful memories of an incident where a bully locked him in a closet for three days after learning his real name. The team identifies three potential suspects, all of them students; Malcolm initially believes that a teacher who had forced the students to help him sell the answers to tests is responsible, but then the real killer traps him and explains that, like him, she hates the burden of her family name and committed the murder to protect her chances of getting into the college of her choice. Malcolm activates a fire alarm to escape, but not before revealing that he deliberately tried to kill his bully by triggering his asthma before saving him after realizing that taking a life would make him no better than his father. Martin discreetly obtains two of the three keycards needed to bypass the hospital's security checkpoints. JT and his wife welcome a son.
24	4	"Take Your Father to Work Day"	Omar Madha	Elizabeth Peterson	February 2, 2021	T88.10204	2.47
Jerry, Martin's old cellmate, falls to his death shortly before his scheduled release. The team determines that he was actually murdered and Malcolm is forced to work with his father, as he was a witness to Jerry's death. Ainsley recovers some of her memories after seeing an identical image of the carpet Malcolm used to wrap Endicott's body and demands her brother tell her the truth about that night, but he refuses. Jessica also gets suspicious and calls Martin, who hints that something might have happened but says nothing else. Jerry's prison girlfriend, Rhonda, claims Martin killed him as part of his escape plan, but Malcolm soon realizes he was misdirected: Rhonda killed Jerry out of anger for leaving her behind and now wants to kill Martin for "curing" him. While pursuing Rhonda, she gets the drop on him and only Martin working together with Dani saves his life. Jessica forces Malcolm to admit the truth. Malcolm tells her never to say a word to Ainsley or they might lose her forever.
25	5	"Bad Manners"	Chris Grismer	Marcus Dalzine	February 9, 2021	T88.10205	1.96
Ainsley undermines Malcolm by interfering with an investigation into the "Debutante Slayer", a serial killer targeting students of the famous Windsor Academy for young women. Jessica, fearful of what Ainsley is capable of, contemplates sending her away to Europe. Gil and JT arrest a professional doll maker for the murders, but Malcolm determines he's not the killer. Ainsley accidentally finds one of the Slayer's victims and turns it into a promo for her network, infuriating her brother who accuses her of treating murder like a game. Ainsley retorts that Malcolm is the last person to be calling her out for such a thing. Their argument comes to a head when the real killer, the neglected daughter of the school headmistress, is revealed and Ainsley tries and fails to stab her. The headmistress commits suicide and the daughter is taken into custody. JT chooses not to file an abuse complaint, saying he won't let hate poison him like his attacker. Jessica visits Martin and makes him promise to help her save their children.
26	6	"Head Case"	Lisa Robinson	Wyatt Cain	February 16, 2021	T88.10206	2.16
Malcolm suffers a severe concussion while investigating a murder in a decrepit hotel. He finds himself trapped in his own subconscious, which changes to reflect a world where he never found out his father's secret: Martin is a happy family man, Jessica never became an alcoholic, Ainsley is now a doctor instead of a journalist, Gil was framed as a lunatic by Martin and is now incarcerated in his place in Claremont, and Malcolm himself is a respected NYPD detective in a healthy relationship with Dani. Although he is tempted by this new reality, Malcolm continues his investigation, learning that the murderer is an elderly serial killer and stopping him. This changes nothing, however, and Malcolm is finally forced to choose between dying and being at peace or rejecting everything he ever wished for. He chooses the latter and helps the police arrest the murderer. That night, Ainsley visits Malcolm so he can tell her the truth, only to reveal that her shirt is covered with blood.
27	7	"Face Value"	Lou Diamond Phillips	Lauriel Harte Marger	March 2, 2021	T88.10207	1.90
Malcolm is torn between watching out for Ainsley and taking on a complicated case involving the murder of a plastic surgeon. Ainsley disobeys her brother's instructions and refuses to hide while he has her clothing tested by Edrisa. Jessica's younger sister, Birdie, makes an unannounced visit; Jessica discovers that Birdie, needing money, has secretly written a tell-all book. Unable to stop the book from being published, she decides to write and publish her own memoirs. Martin is assigned to work as a janitor in Claremont's infirmary, run by Dr. Vivian Capshaw, and bonds with her when he steps in to correct her faulty diagnosis of a patient. Malcolm saves another surgeon on the brink of death and he and Dani learn that the killer is, in fact, a formerly disfigured patient who assumed a new identity in order to take revenge for her botched operation. Malcolm convinces her that letting her final victim live will be a far greater revenge. He later confronts Ainsley with his discovery that the blood on her shirt was pig, not human. Ainsley tells him that she is done being manipulated and that Malcolm will just have to make peace with the knowledge that his sister is a murderer. In Estonia, Europol detective Simon Hoxley finds the last of Nicholas Endicott's remains.
28	8	"Ouroboros"	Chris Grismer	Nora Zuckerman & Lilla Zuckerman	April 13, 2021	T88.10208	1.95
Malcolm's latest case forces him to cross paths with Hoxley, who announces to the press that Endicott's murder was part of a larger conspiracy involving a network of international smugglers. Hoxley soon proves himself to be just as smart as Malcolm, deducing that Endicott was murdered in Jessica's townhouse and that Martin helped dispose of the body; however, he concludes that Malcolm, not Ainsley, stabbed Endicott. Malcolm turns his focus to solving the case: based on Hoxley's previous work, he realizes that someone is killing everyone involved with the disposal of Endicott's remains. Forced to deceive his own team, he tracks down the last remaining courier, a woman named Natalie, but comes to the realization that, not only is she the real killer, she knows about his role in Endicott's murder. Malcolm stops her from killing Hoxley, but Natalie refuses to let him help her and winds up getting impaled on an anchor. A grateful Hoxley agrees with Malcolm that Natalie killed Endicott and declares so in an interview with Ainsley. Martin is confronted by Vivian for stealing; the two give into their feelings for each other and briefly kiss.
29	9	"The Killabustas"	Dermott Downs	Sabrina Deana-Roga	April 20, 2021	T88.10209	1.90
Martin is forcibly restrained on Vivian's orders after he demands that she reciprocate his love for her. Despite Gil's insistence that he take a break from work, Malcolm joins an investigation into a dismembered corpse. The victim turns out to have a connection to Edrisa: both are members of the "Killabusters", a group of amateur Internet detectives. After running into several other Killabusters, Malcolm invites them to assist. Vivian secretly visits Martin that evening, revealing that she has admired him since medical school and tried to emulate his success, only to be ignored by her peers until a reckless mistake ruined her professional career. Martin seizes the opportunity and pushes her until she gives in and has sex with him. Malcolm realizes that the killer is posing as a Killabuster and he and Edrisa are able to capture him before he finishes off his latest victim. Gil and Jessica share a dance after he agrees to help her with her memoirs. Malcolm is discussing the incident with Natalie with Dani when he accidentally mentions Endicott; shocked and frightened that she might figure out what he did, he sends her away.
30	10	"Exit Strategy"	Satya Bhabha	Eileen Jones & Alexis Siegel	April 27, 2021	T88.10210	1.80
Vivian begins to suspect that Friar Pete is planning something, but he blackmails her with knowledge of her affair with Martin to keep quiet. Malcolm discovers that the only witness to a brutal murder is a retired chess grandmaster suffering from agoraphobia; as he refuses to leave his apartment, Dani agrees to interview him in his home. Malcolm bonds with him after the witness reveals that he knows about the former's hidden feelings for Dani. Martin springs his secret plan by having Pete poison numerous inmates with rat poison, forcing Vivian to undo his restraints so he can help her, tricking her into giving him her keycard, and then triggering a lockdown so he, Pete, and Pete's disciple can escape. He abandons Vivian, telling her that his family matters more. Malcolm helps the witness escape from the killer when he tries to silence him and Dani arrives in time to arrest him. Jessica is trapped in Claremont during a visit and is forced to stab an inmate in self-defense before Gil rescues her. Malcolm finds a voicemail from his father telling him to come find him, just as Dani informs him of the breakout.
31	11	"You Can Run..."	Marisol Adler	Elizabeth Peterson & Jeremy Powell	May 4, 2021	T88.10211	1.98
Malcolm joins the hunt for the escapees, struggling with the realization that he no longer has any control over Martin. After finding his apartment ransacked, he deduces that the fugitives need money and food, locating Friar Pete in a bowling alley. Pete tries to kill him before being shot dead, angering Malcolm as he now has no leads. Jessica unexpectedly bonds with both JT and Vivian over shared experiences of guilt and trauma. The team gets a new lead when they learn that Martin has secretly been in touch with Ainsley; this leads Malcolm and Gil to a farm where they soon realize someone is holding the owner's family hostage. Federal marshals storm the house and rescue the hostages but, when Malcolm follows them in, he only finds the other escaped inmate. The man laughs and says Martin simply told them what to do, meaning he has been leading everyone on a wild goose chase. Malcolm visits Vivian, who has been fired for her conduct, and says that he will never let his father manipulate him again. Unbeknownst to everyone, Vivian, having suffered a psychotic break, has kidnapped Martin and has her own plans for him.
32	12	"Sun and Fun"	Chris Grismer	Lisa Randolph	May 11, 2021	T88.10212	1.83
Vivian takes Martin to a rural mansion, where she reveals her plan to psychologically break him until he accepts his new role as her "companion"; Martin resists and she resorts to more brutal methods. Malcolm is removed from the effort to recapture his father, so he has Jessica use her connections to obtain information on Vivian, who he initially believes is a victim. Gil and the team refuse to help him; Dani urges Malcolm to let his father die, so he can finally be free of his influence. Malcolm then realizes Vivian abducted his father and allows himself to be captured as well so he can try to save him. Vivian contacts Jessica and persuades her not to tell Gil about Martin by promising she will "deal" with him. At the mansion, Martin is forced to watch as Vivian intentionally botches a surgery on Malcolm and then leaves him to die. Managing to break his bonds, Martin saves his son's life. Ainsley and Dani show up; Vivian stabs herself and screams that the Surgeon attacked her. Fearing that Dani will shoot him, Martin steals a speedboat, loads a comatose Malcolm in it, and escapes on the open waters.
33	13	"The Last Weekend"	Chris Grismer	Sam Sklaver & Nora Zuckerman & Lilla Zuckerman	May 18, 2021	T88.10213	1.75
Jessica and Gil use audio surveillance to gain a verbal confession from Capshaw that she was Martin's captor and not his potential next victim. Edrisa's restoration of previously wiped information incriminates Capshaw for several murders under her medical watch. Martin takes Malcolm to a Vermont town to beat the clock in saving the life of a young woman who's the latest captive of the Woodsman, whose unsolved case has haunted Bright since his time with the FBI. Communicating with her father via fax, Ainsley helps Dani and JT to rescue Malcolm and capture both Martin and the Woodsman, who they discover is the husband of the town's sheriff who had enabled his killing spree. Martin flees the crime scene to elude law enforcement after he and Malcolm are captured by, then subdue, the Woodsman. Malcolm's attempt to bring his father back to justice ends when he stabs Martin in self-defense. Dani arrives seconds later and is shocked to see what Malcolm did.

== Release ==
On May 13, 2019, Fox released the first official trailer for the series.

Internationally, the series aired on Global in Canada, on Sky One in the United Kingdom, on Fox One in Australia, and on Colors Infinity in India. From January 9, 2026, the series is available on Netflix.

== Reception ==
=== Critical response ===
The review aggregator website Rotten Tomatoes reported a 58% approval rating with an average rating of 6.19/10, based on 33 reviews. The website's critical consensus reads, "Though it shows promise, Prodigal Son sidelines a spectacular Michael Sheen in favor of a more pedestrian procedural storyline that often drifts too deeply into the grotesque." Metacritic, which uses a weighted average, assigned a score of 61 out of 100 based on 14 critics, indicating "generally favorable reviews".

=== Ratings ===
Viewership and ratings per season of Prodigal Son
Season	Timeslot (ET)	Episodes	First aired		Last aired		TV season	Viewership rank	Avg. viewers (millions)
Season	Timeslot (ET)	Episodes	Date	Viewers (millions)	Date	Viewers (millions)	TV season	Viewership rank	Avg. viewers (millions)
1	Monday 9:00 p.m.	20	September 23, 2019	4.05	April 27, 2020	3.38	2019–20	62	5.83
2	Tuesday 9:00 p.m.	13	January 12, 2021	2.34	May 18, 2021	1.75	2020–21	73	4.04

==== Season 1 ====
Viewership and ratings per episode of Prodigal Son
No.	Title	Air date	Rating/share (18–49)	Viewers (millions)	DVR (18–49)	DVR viewers (millions)	Total (18–49)	Total viewers (millions)
1	"Pilot"	September 23, 2019	1.0/4	4.05	0.8	3.30	1.8	7.35
2	"Annihilator"	September 30, 2019	1.0/5	3.90	0.7	2.78	1.7	6.68
3	"Fear Response"	October 7, 2019	0.9/4	3.66	0.7	2.63	1.6	6.29
4	"Designer Complicity"	October 14, 2019	0.8/4	3.18	0.7	2.77	1.5	5.95
5	"The Trip"	October 21, 2019	0.7/4	3.34	0.7	2.26	1.4	5.60
6	"All Souls and Sadists"	October 28, 2019	0.7/4	3.39	0.7	2.42	1.4	5.81
7	"Q&A"	November 4, 2019	0.7/4	3.13	0.7	2.52	1.4	5.65
8	"Family Friend"	November 11, 2019	0.8/4	3.30	0.6	2.45	1.4	5.76
9	"Pied-A-Terre"	November 25, 2019	0.7/3	3.04	0.7	2.53	1.4	5.58
10	"Silent Night"	December 2, 2019	0.7/4	3.35	0.6	2.33	1.3	5.68
11	"Alone Time"	January 20, 2020	0.7/3	3.07	0.6	2.50	1.3	5.58
12	"Internal Affairs"	January 27, 2020	0.6/3	3.15	0.7	2.31	1.3	5.46
13	"Wait & Hope"	February 3, 2020	0.8	3.53	0.7	2.76	1.5	6.29
14	"Eye of the Needle"	February 10, 2020	0.7	3.09	0.6	2.38	1.3	5.47
15	"Death's Door"	February 17, 2020	0.6	3.33	0.4	1.66	1.0	4.99
16	"The Job"	March 16, 2020	0.7	3.28	0.6	2.53	1.3	5.81
17	"Stranger Beside You"	March 23, 2020	0.8	3.45	0.6	2.38	1.4	5.83
18	"Scheherazade"	March 30, 2020	0.7	3.47	0.6	2.24	1.3	5.71
19	"The Professionals"	April 20, 2020	0.7	3.33	0.6	2.31	1.3	5.64
20	"Like Father..."	April 27, 2020	0.7	3.38	0.5	2.05	1.2	5.43

==== Season 2 ====
Viewership and ratings per episode of Prodigal Son
No.	Title	Air date	Rating (18–49)	Viewers (millions)	DVR (18–49)	DVR viewers (millions)	Total (18–49)	Total viewers (millions)
1	"It's All in the Execution"	January 12, 2021	0.5	2.34	0.6	2.40	1.1	4.74
2	"Speak of the Devil"	January 19, 2021	0.5	2.37	—N/a	—N/a	—N/a	—N/a
3	"Alma Mater"	January 26, 2021	0.4	2.18	—N/a	—N/a	—N/a	—N/a
4	"Take Your Father to Work Day"	February 2, 2021	0.5	2.47	—N/a	—N/a	—N/a	—N/a
5	"Bad Manners"	February 9, 2021	0.4	1.96	0.4	1.98	0.8	3.94
6	"Head Case"	February 16, 2021	0.4	2.16	0.5	2.13	0.9	4.29
7	"Face Value"	March 2, 2021	0.4	1.90	0.5	2.23	0.8	4.14
8	"Ouroboros"	April 13, 2021	0.4	1.95	0.4	2.07	0.8	4.03
9	"The Killabustas"	April 20, 2021	0.4	1.90	0.3	1.85	0.7	3.75
10	"Exit Strategy"	April 27, 2021	0.3	1.80	0.4	1.83	0.7	3.63
11	"You Can Run..."	May 4, 2021	0.4	1.98	0.4	1.80	0.8	3.78
12	"Sun and Fun"	May 11, 2021	0.4	1.83	0.3	1.68	0.7	3.51
13	"The Last Weekend"	May 18, 2021	0.3	1.75	0.3	1.60	0.7	3.35

== Home media ==
Warner Archive Collection released the complete first season as a manufacture-on-demand DVD and Blu-ray on September 8, 2020.
