= Haven season 3 =

Haven
- Season 3
- Region 1 DVD cover
- Starring: Emily Rose; Lucas Bryant; Eric Balfour
- No. of episodes: 13

Release
- Original network: Syfy
- Original release: September 21, 2012 – January 17, 2013

Season chronology
- ← Previous; Season 2 Next → Season 4

The third season of the American television series Haven premiered September 21, 2012 and consisted a total of 13 episodes. The show stars Emily Rose, Lucas Bryant and Eric Balfour.

== Cast ==
=== Main cast ===
- Emily Rose as Audrey Parker / Lucy Ripley / Sarah Vernon
- Lucas Bryant as Nathan Wuornos
- Eric Balfour as Duke Crocker

=== Recurring cast ===
- Richard Donat as Vince Teagues
- John Dunsworth as Dave Teagues
- Edge (credited as WWE Superstar Edge) as Dwight Hendrickson
- Bree Williamson as Claire Callahan
- Laura Vandervoort^{c}, Dorian Missick and Bree Williamson as Arla Cogan / The Bolt-Gun Killer
- Kate Kelton as Jordan McKee^{a}
- Maurice Dean Wint as Agent Byron Howard
- Steve Lund as James Cogan^{b}

=== Guest stars ===
- Dorian Missick as Tommy Bowen
- Claudia Black as Moira
- Nolan North as Will Brady
- Iain Glen as Roland Holloway
- Melanie Scrofano as Noelle
- Nicholas Campbell as Garland Wuornos

a Kelton was also credited in "Stay", but her appearance in that episode was cut.
b Also credited in the cast bill in "Over My Head".
c Credited as a special guest star.

== Episodes ==
No. overall	No. in season	Title	Directed by	Written by	Original release date	US viewers (millions)
27	1	"301"	Lee Rose	Jonathan Abrahams	September 21, 2012	2.00
Nathan and Duke try to find Audrey and rescue her from the force behind her mysterious abduction, but problems arise when Haven starts going haywire due to a series of the strangest events the town has yet seen.
28	2	"Stay"	Shawn Piller	Matt McGuiness	September 28, 2012	1.44
When a number of raving barbarians start wreaking havoc in Haven's streets, Audrey and Nathan uncover the origins of the brutish madmen so that they can be stopped before they are able to cause more trouble.
29	3	"The Farmer"	T. W. Peacocke	Sam Ernst & Jim Dunn	October 5, 2012	1.57
After corpses missing vital organs start popping up around Haven, Audrey and Nathan embark on a manhunt for the most sadistic troubled person that may have ever faced. Duke must confront the fate his father warned him about.
30	4	"Over My Head"	Rob Lieberman	Gabrielle Stanton	October 12, 2012	1.72
After a series of strange, ocean-related deaths occur in Haven, Audrey races desperately to find a connection between the victims so that she can come up with an explanation for the deaths, knowing that her time is quickly running out.
31	5	"Double Jeopardy"	Nisha Ganatra	Nora Zuckerman & Lilla Zuckerman	October 19, 2012	1.45
When a seemingly unstoppable woman ruthlessly stalks the criminals of Haven in order to enforce her own ideas of justice and punishment, Audrey must find a way to stop her before she gets to the not so law-abiding Duke.
32	6	"Real Estate"	Jason Priestley	Brian Millikin	October 26, 2012	1.41
As Hallow's Eve brings terror to Haven, Audrey, Nathan, Duke and the others are trapped and must spend Halloween night in one of Haven's most infamous buildings, a haunted house to which they were all mysteriously led.
33	7	"Magic Hour (Part 1)"	Paul Fox	Shernold Edwards	November 2, 2012	1.55
Audrey and Duke have finally found a clue about the Colorado Kid's real identity and they travel west to follow the lead and maybe discover once and for all who the Colorado Kid is. Nathan and Tommy are left to deal with a strange extortion racket.
34	8	"Magic Hour (Part 2)"	Paul Fox	Sam Ernst & Jim Dunn	November 9, 2012	1.60
Back from Colorado, Audrey and Duke join Tommy in an attempt to find the woman with the resurrection touch before nightfall when it will be too late. Tommy tries to keep his secret hidden by covertly sabotaging the search.
35	9	"Sarah"	Stephen Reynolds	Nora Zuckerman & Lilla Zuckerman	November 16, 2012	1.62
Duke meets a Troubled person after searching the Crocker family journal for a cure to his curse and suddenly finds himself in 1955 Haven, where he can't help but change aspects of the present until Nathan can find a way to get him home.
36	10	"Burned"	T. W. Peacocke	Charles Ardai	November 30, 2012	1.53
Audrey finds out that the burned corpse that's been buried in a shallow grave for more than a month is Tommy, meaning the real Tommy was dead before they ever met him. The town falls under the spell of a troubling girl whose every wish is Haven's command.
37	11	"Last Goodbyes"	Steven A. Adelson	Brian Millikin & Shernold Edwards	December 7, 2012	1.56
All of Haven is deeply asleep, so Audrey has no choice but to work with the only person in town who is still awake. The only problem is that he is suffering from amnesia and Audrey must find out who he is before she can resolve the bigger problem.
38	12	"Reunion"	Lee Rose	Gabrielle Stanton	January 17, 2013	1.31
The Haven High School becomes the scene of a string of bizarre murders. When Nathan and Duke return to their old school to help Audrey find whoever is responsible, it brings back old memories.
39	13	"Thanks for the Memories"	Shawn Piller	Sam Ernst & Jim Dunn	January 17, 2013	1.36
Audrey, Nathan and Duke must face off against the dastardly Bolt Gun Killer once and for all and do anything they can to halt Audrey's impending fate, or at the very least, come to terms with the fact that she could disappear forever.

== Production ==
On October 12, 2011, Syfy picked up Haven for a thirteen-episode third season expected to air in 2012, with production beginning on April 18. As the last two seasons ended with a cliffhanger, this season picked up where season two left off.

Adam "Edge" Copeland returned to the series after originally starting out as a guest in season 2 before his role was expanded to recurring that season. Bree Williamson joined the cast as Claire Callahan. Dorian Missick and Kate Kelton also joined the cast in recurring roles.

Season 3's guest stars include Iain Glen along with Nolan North and Claudia Black, who both co-starred with Emily Rose in the Uncharted videogame series, and Laura Vandervoort.

The season's penultimate episode "Reunion", which dealt with a string of murders at Haven High School, and the season finale "Thanks for the Memories" were originally slated to air on December 14 and 21 respectively but Syfy pulled both episodes from the schedule and moved them to January 17, 2013 as a back-to-back season finale with repeats of the Eureka and Warehouse 13 holiday episodes airing in their place due to the Sandy Hook Elementary School shooting that occurred on the day "Reunion" was going to air.

== Home media release ==
Haven: The Complete Third Season
Set details	Special features	
13 episodes; 4-disc set; 1.78:1 aspect ratio; Subtitles: English, Spanish, French (USA version not Including); English (Dolby Digital 5.1 Surround); English (Master Audio 5.1 Surround) – Blu-ray	The Haunting Truth about Haven: A Documentary; Six Audio Commentaries with the Writers; "Escape to Haven" Webisode Series; Haven Panel at New York Comic Con; Deleted/Alternate Scenes; Interviews With The Cast And Guest Stars; Behind-the-Scenes; Blooper Reel; Season 3 Trailers; Season 4 Teaser; Haven: After the Storm comic	
DVD release dates
Region 1	Region 2	Region 4
September 3, 2013	September 30, 2013	May 1, 2013
