= Haven season 1 =

Haven
- Season 1
- Region 1 DVD cover
- Starring: Emily Rose; Lucas Bryant; Nicholas Campbell; Eric Balfour
- No. of episodes: 13

Release
- Original network: Syfy
- Original release: July 9 – October 8, 2010

Season chronology
- Next → Season 2

The first season of the American television series Haven premiered on July 9, 2010, and concluded on October 8, 2010, on Syfy. The show aired on Fridays at 10:00 pm ET. The season consisted of 13 episodes. The show was filmed in Nova Scotia, Canada and starred Emily Rose, Lucas Bryant, Nicholas Campbell and Eric Balfour.

== Storylines ==
=== Audrey Parker ===
In the beginning of season one, Audrey is dispatched to Haven, Maine, USA, to investigate the death of an escaped federal prisoner named Jonas Lester, a former Haven resident. On her first day in town, she nearly runs her Ford Taurus off a cliff, but is rescued by Detective Nathan Wuornos, who ends up assisting in her investigation. She meets Havenites Conrad Brauer and Duke Crocker, as well as journalists Vince and Dave Teagues, before discovering that Lester was thrown to his death by a local woman named Marion Caldwell. Incredibly, Audrey finds that Marion killed the man using her paranormal abilities.

The Teagues show Audrey an old newspaper clipping with a photo of a young boy, as well as a woman who strongly resembles Audrey herself. Her curiosity is awakened and after solving the Lester case, Parker chooses to stay in Maine, using several weeks of her accrued vacation time. She questions Haven Police Chief Garland Wuornos (Nathan's father) about the woman in the picture. The photo is related to a 1983 case involving the "Colorado Kid," and Wuornos was an investigator. The Chief agrees to look into the matter and finds the old evidence box. They open the sealed box but discover that it's empty.

After solving the bizarre destruction of a bar called the Rust Bucket with Nathan, Audrey is offered a position with the Haven Police Department by Chief Wuornos, who cites Parker's willingness to "see things as they are" as a valuable trait. At the end of season one, Parker's supervisor, Agent Howard, demands that she give him a reason for her continued presence in Haven. Audrey explains that she has to pursue a personal search for her past and her identity. So she quit her job with the FBI on the spot.

=== Nathan Wuornos ===
In the beginning of season one, Nathan rescues FBI Agent Audrey Parker when her vehicle runs off the road and crashes through a barrier. He subsequently investigates the death of Jonas Lester with her, and is later shot through the shoulder while arresting a man named Ted Ford. Strangely, Nathan doesn't seem to react to being shot. He also investigates the bizarre destruction of a ship called the Rust Bucket with Parker. Another case involves the bizarre behavior of doctors and patients at the Murray Q. Frederickson Psychiatric Facility, when Nathan suffers a psychotic episode after falling victim to Ray McBreen's metaphysical power. Other cases include the inexplicable putrefaction of food surrounding Bill and Jeff McShaw at the Second Chance Bistro, the rapid-aging deaths of Phil Reiser and Joe Campbell, the mauling deaths of T. R. Holt and Brad Donnelly, the baffling attack on Eliot Wallace aboard the ship Endorfin and the death of Joe Sandimaro, as well as the deaths of Hessberg nurses Bill Rand and Mrs. Wilson.

Nathan pursues a relationship with animal-rights activist Jess Minnion, though he experiences anxiety over being intimate with her because, as we find out, he can't feel physical sensation. The relationship ends after Minnion is attacked and nearly killed during one of Nathan's investigations (involving the Dark Man). Jess decides to return to Montreal, unable to cope with being drawn into the dangers inherent in Wuornos's line of work. After she leaves, Nathan discovers that he is able to feel the touch of Audrey Parker, and though he keeps the discovery to himself, he begins to find excuses to be in physical contact with her.

Nathan attends a surprise birthday party for Parker at a hotel on a nearby island called Carpenter's Knot. A sudden storm hits and the lights go out. While trying to restore power, the guests find the hotel owner lying dead in a shapeless heap. Chief Wuornos, Nathan's father and one of the guests, explains the strange circumstances, saying that a shape-shifter must have been posing as the hotel owner for years. The "chameleon" has killed one of the guests during the blackout to assume a new identity. The elder Wuornos forbids anyone to leave the island until they discover the murderer, but then, his son falls under suspicion. Nathan has to act quickly to clear himself: he seizes Audrey, kisses her and then shoots her because he can't feel her touch and he knows that the chameleon has taken Parker's form. The chameleon, while dying, confesses to Nathan that Audrey is different and Nathan realizes that his partner is still alive. Fortunately, the guests find Parker and revive her. Nathan however, is very much aware that, in shooting Audrey, he has mirrored an action that his father took in May 1983.

In the season's final episode, Max Hanson, who once lived in Haven, is paroled from Shawshank State Prison and returns to the town. Nathan then discovers that he is adopted and that the man is really his father. He also learns that his adoptive father, Chief Wuornos, has been struggling for decades to psychically hold the town of Haven together. When Garland's control over the town begins to fail, he is killed in one final effort to save Haven. Nathan is initially angry at Audrey for not offering the older man comfort, but he later apologizes and reveals he can feel her touch. Nathan is there when another "Audrey Parker" arrives at the close of the episode.

=== Duke Crocker ===
At the beginning of season one, Duke appears at the Haven, Maine police station to report a stolen revolver. Later, Crocker rescues FBI Agent Audrey Parker from drowning on her second day in town. He washes her clothes while she sleeps and makes her coffee the next morning – with milk and one sugar, exactly the way she likes it – even though Audrey has never seen the young man before. After Duke is arrested when his "stolen" gun turns up on Tuwiuwok Bluff, at the scene of Jonus Lester's mysterious death, Audrey clears him of suspicion in the case.

Duke later acquires a stuffed marlin that once hung on the wall of the Shiny Scupper Restaurant and inadvertently buys the deed to the Second Chance Bistro from Bill McShaw for $20. Duke turns the place into the Grey Gull - a new bar/restaurant. In a later episode, he attends a surprise birthday party for Parker, and gives her a locket with the initials L.R. on the back. He admits that Lucy Ripley gave him the locket and that the old newspaper photo of Lucy (who uncannily resembles Audrey) also includes himself as a little boy.

=== Garland Wuornos ===
In the beginning of season one, Haven's Chief of Police, Garland Wuornos, grudgingly allows FBI Agent Audrey Parker access to the investigation of Jonas Lester's death, despite claiming that the man's greatest contribution to the town of Haven is dying. Lester is an escaped federal prisoner, so Parker is determined to figure out what happened to him and after the successful conclusion of the Lester case, Wuornos agrees to let Agent Parker look into the evidence container pertaining to the Colorado Kid murder. The two discover that the container (still closed with its original seal) is in fact, empty.

Wuornos subsequently offers Agent Parker a job with the Haven Police Department, citing her willingness to "see things the way they are" as a valuable asset to his department. He is a member of the Haven Hunt Club, and is leading a hunt through the woods surrounding Haven when two members of the Club are attacked and killed by what appear to be wild animals. Later, Wuornos is among the guests attending a surprise birthday party for Parker on a local island called Carpenter's Knot when he must explain the nature of chameleons after one of them attacks a party guest. He later helps his son, Detective Nathan Wuornos, track Duke Crocker's boat, the Cape Rouge, when it is hijacked with Audrey on-board.

At the end of season one, he encounters the newly-paroled Max Hansen, and in his anger, fails to hold up the Walton Lighthouse, which collapses. It turns out that Garland has literally been keeping the town of Haven together for years using psychic energy. Fearing that Nathan will soon discover that he has a past connection to Hansen, Garland admits to Nathan that the young man is adopted and is really Hansen's son. An argument follows and Garland believes that he has created an irreparable rift between himself and Nathan. In his anger over the argument, Garland fails to prevent a fissure from cracking a street as Hansen tries to escape, resulting in the parolee's death. As the elder Wuornos realizes that his control of the town is faltering, he goes out to Edgewater Beach, where he is later discovered by Audrey and Nathan. He struggles to regain control as fresh cracks open on the beach, and ultimately manages to heal the fissures by absorbing them into himself. Garland turns to stone and is shattered as a result. His remains are seen moving slightly after being collected.

== Cast ==
=== Main cast ===
- Emily Rose as Audrey Parker / Lucy Ripley
- Lucas Bryant as Nathan Wuornos
- Nicholas Campbell as Garland Wuornos
- Eric Balfour as Duke Crocker

=== Recurring cast ===
- Richard Donat as Vince Teagues^{a}^{b}
- John Dunsworth as Dave Teagues^{a}^{b}
- Mary-Colin Chisholm as Eleanor Carr^{b}
- Anne Caillon as Jess Minnion
- Michelle Monteith as Julia Carr

a Donat and Dunsworth were promoted to recurring starting with "Ball and Chain". In the pilot, their names originally appear right after the title logo.
b Also has an uncredited role in "Consumed".

=== Guest stars ===
- Nicole de Boer as Marion Caldwell
- Maurice Dean Wint as Agent Byron Howard
- Stephen McHattie as Ed Driscoll
- Devon Bostick as Jimmy

== Episodes ==
No. overall	No. in season	Title	Directed by	Written by	Original release date	US viewers (millions)
1	1	"Welcome to Haven"	Adam Kane	Sam Ernst & Jim Dunn	July 9, 2010	2.34
FBI Agent Audrey Parker travels to the town called Haven to investigate the death of an escaped prisoner. She soon discovers that his death is the tip of the iceberg for supernatural phenomena, including someone whose moods appear to affect the weather.
2	2	"Butterfly"	Tim Southam	Sam Ernst	July 16, 2010	2.09
Audrey remains in Haven to investigate her mother's connection to the Colorado Kid, but ends up investigating the destruction of a bar and a series of incidents targeting her and others.
3	3	"Harmony"	Rachel Talalay	Matt McGuinness	July 23, 2010	1.84
As Audrey settles into her new job as police officer in Haven, she and Nathan investigate an upheaval at the local psychiatric hospital involving something that causes the mad to become sane and vice versa. Audrey gets her first clue to the woman in the picture of the Colorado Kid. Her name might have been Lucy.
4	4	"Consumed"	Rachel Talalay	Ann Hamilton	July 30, 2010	2.13
Audrey investigates strange phenomena involving the food served at a local restaurant, Second Chance.
5	5	"Ball and Chain"	Tim Southam	Nikki Toscano	August 6, 2010	1.88
Audrey and Nathan investigate a series of deaths involving accelerated aging. Duke asks Audrey out to dinner on Friday, but she cancels on him. Duke is one of the victims and almost dies. Duke and Audrey get their dinner at last.
6	6	"Fur"	Keith Samples	Jim Dunn	August 13, 2010	2.00
Audrey and Nathan investigate a series of deaths involving serial killings committed by animals.
7	7	"Sketchy"	T. W. Peacocke	Matt McGuinness	August 20, 2010	1.89
Audrey and Nathan investigate a series of deaths involving art.
8	8	"Ain't No Sunshine"	Ken Girotti	Sam Ernst	August 27, 2010	1.97
Audrey and Nathan investigate a series of attacks committed by the Dark Man. Nathan is nervous about telling Jess that he can't feel any part of his body.
9	9	"As You Were"	Rob Lieberman	Jose Molina	September 10, 2010	1.76
Audrey's friends throw her a surprise birthday party at a local island hotel. When the party is crashed by a shapeshifter, however, no one is sure who they can trust.
10	10	"The Hand You're Dealt"	Rick Rosenthal	Jim Dunn	September 17, 2010	1.59
Gruesome deaths involving fire are occurring and Duke's old babysitter may be the key to the answer. Meanwhile, evidence is uncovered about the involvement of a secret society of conspirators during the troubles.
11	11	"The Trial of Audrey Parker"	Lee Rose	Story by : Charles Ardai; Teleplay by : Sam Ernst & Jose Molina	September 24, 2010	1.41
Audrey's boss in the FBI comes to Haven to evaluate Audrey's work and lack of reports. Complications arise when hijackers with mysterious insights lock in everyone on Duke's boat including Audrey and her boss and head out to sea. Meanwhile Nathan's father tries to reconnect.
12	12	"Resurfacing"	Mike Rohl	Charles Ardai	October 1, 2010	1.44
When the wreckage of a small vessel washes up on shore, a mysterious force begins attacking visitors to one sailor's family, prompting an investigation. In the process, Audrey uncovers a secret of her origins and what became of Lucy. Meanwhile, a crooked deal puts Duke's life on the line.
13	13	"Spiral"	Fred Gerber	Sam Ernst & Jim Dunn	October 8, 2010	1.70
Audrey grapples with a shocking revelation about herself as a mysterious criminal returns to town. A mysterious past comes back to haunt Nathan and the Chief.

== Home media release ==
Haven: The Complete First Season
Set details	Special features	
13 episodes; 4-disc set; 1.78:1 aspect ratio; Subtitles: English; English (Dolby Digital 5.1 Surround); English (Master Audio 5.1 Surround) – Blu-ray	Twelve Audio Commentaries with Cast & Crew; Welcome to Haven; Visual FX of Haven; Mythology of Haven; Six Behind-the-Scenes Video Blogs; What is Haven to You?; Let the Good Times Roll...; Location, Location, Location; Emily Rose Q&A; Stephen King References in "Spiral"; SCI FI Wire Interview with Emily Rose; Season One Trailer; Additional Interviews with Emily Rose, Lucas Bryant and Eric Balfour; Season Two Sneak Peek Inside the Writers' Room	
DVD release dates
Region 1	Region 2	Region 4
June 14, 2011	January 30, 2012	June 1, 2011
