= Nora Zuckerman =

American television screenwriter

- Born: Nora Lynn Zuckerman; March 6, 1976 (age 50); Los Angeles, California, United States
- Occupation: Television writer
- Years active: 2006–present
- Known for: Fringe, Human Target, Haven, Suits, Poker Face

Nora Lynn Zuckerman (born March 6, 1976) is an American television screenwriter, who has worked on a number of television series, most notably the FOX science fiction series Fringe and the Syfy original series Haven, Suits, Agents of S.H.I.E.L.D., Prodigal Son and most recently Poker Face. She often collaborates with her sister, Lilla Zuckerman.

== Career ==
Zuckerman's television career began when she worked as a writer/producer on the short-lived American telenovela Desire, which ran from September 5, 2006 until December 5, 2006.

In 2009, she worked with her sister as a staff writer on the second season of the FOX series Fringe, co-writing the episode, "Northwest Passage" (co-written by Lilla and producers Ashley Edward Miller and Zack Stentz).

She worked as a story editor on another Fox series, Human Target and again co-wrote one episode, entitled "Dead Head", with her sister and Dan E. Fesman, based on a story by Tom Spezialy.

After Human Target's cancellation, in May 2011, she and her sister were hired as story editors on the Syfy series Haven, a mystery/thriller based on The Colorado Kid by Stephen King, where they wrote eight episodes, including fan-favorites "Audrey Parker's Day Off" and "Sarah".

Nora and Lilla Zuckerman went on to write and produce on two seasons of the USA television series, Suits, then became co-executive producers on Agents of S.H.I.E.L.D. for seasons four through seven, writing multiple episodes. They then went on to be writers and co-executive producers of Prodigal Son for both seasons of its run.

Zuckerman and her sister are the showrunners and executive producers of Poker Face, a Peacock mystery crime drama created by Rian Johnson and starring Natasha Lyonne. It was met with critical acclaim upon its January 2023 release.

In 2024, it was announced that a series based on Tess Gerritsen's novel The Spy Coast is under development and Zuckerman is attached to write and executive produce the series.

Zuckerman and her sister were also the writers/creators/Executive Producers of Buffy the Vampire Slayer: New Sunnydale, which produced a pilot for Hulu directed by Chloe Zhao but was not picked up to series.

The Zuckermans have sold multiple pilots, often working with USA Network, CBS, HBO Max, and Peacock.
