= Lilla Zuckerman =

American showrunner, television writer, and producer

- Born: Lilla Anne Zuckerman; September 2, 1974 (age 51); Los Angeles, California, United States
- Occupations: Television writer and producer
- Years active: 2009–present
- Known for: Fringe, Human Target, Haven

Lilla Anne Zuckerman (born September 2, 1974) is an American showrunner, television writer and producer. She is currently the showrunner of Poker Face which was created by Rian Johnson and stars Natasha Lyonne. She has worked on a number of television series, most notably Agents of S.H.I.E.L.D., Prodigal Son, Suits, and Fringe. She has also worked on Human Target, and the Syfy original series Haven. She often collaborates with her sister, Nora Zuckerman.

== Career ==
Zuckerman's television career began in 2009 when she started working with her sister as a staff writer and production staffer on the second season of the FOX series Fringe.

She then moved to another FOX series, Human Target. After Human Target's cancellation in May 2011, She and her sister were hired on the Syfy series Haven, a mystery/thriller series based on The Colorado Kid by Stephen King, where they wrote eight episodes, including fan-favorites, "Audrey Parker's Day Off" and "Sarah".

With her sister Nora, she moved on to write and produce four episodes of the USA television series, Suits then spent four seasons as a co-executive producer on Marvel Television's series Agents of S.H.I.E.L.D. which aired on ABC network. They also served as co-executive producers on Fox's Prodigal Son.

Lilla and Nora just wrote, produced and completed their showrunning duties on Season One of Poker Face, a throwback case-of-the-week procedural in the style of Columbo, streaming on Peacock Network.

Zuckerman and her sister were also the writers/creators/Executive Producers of Buffy the Vampire Slayer: New Sunnydale, which produced a pilot for Hulu directed by Chloe Zhao but was not picked up to series.

Lilla and Nora have sold multiple pilots to USA Network, CBS, Warner Brothers, and Peacock

It was announced on April 1, 2026 that Lilla and her sister Nora have been assigned to pen the script for Scream 8.
