= Emily Rose (actress) =

American actress

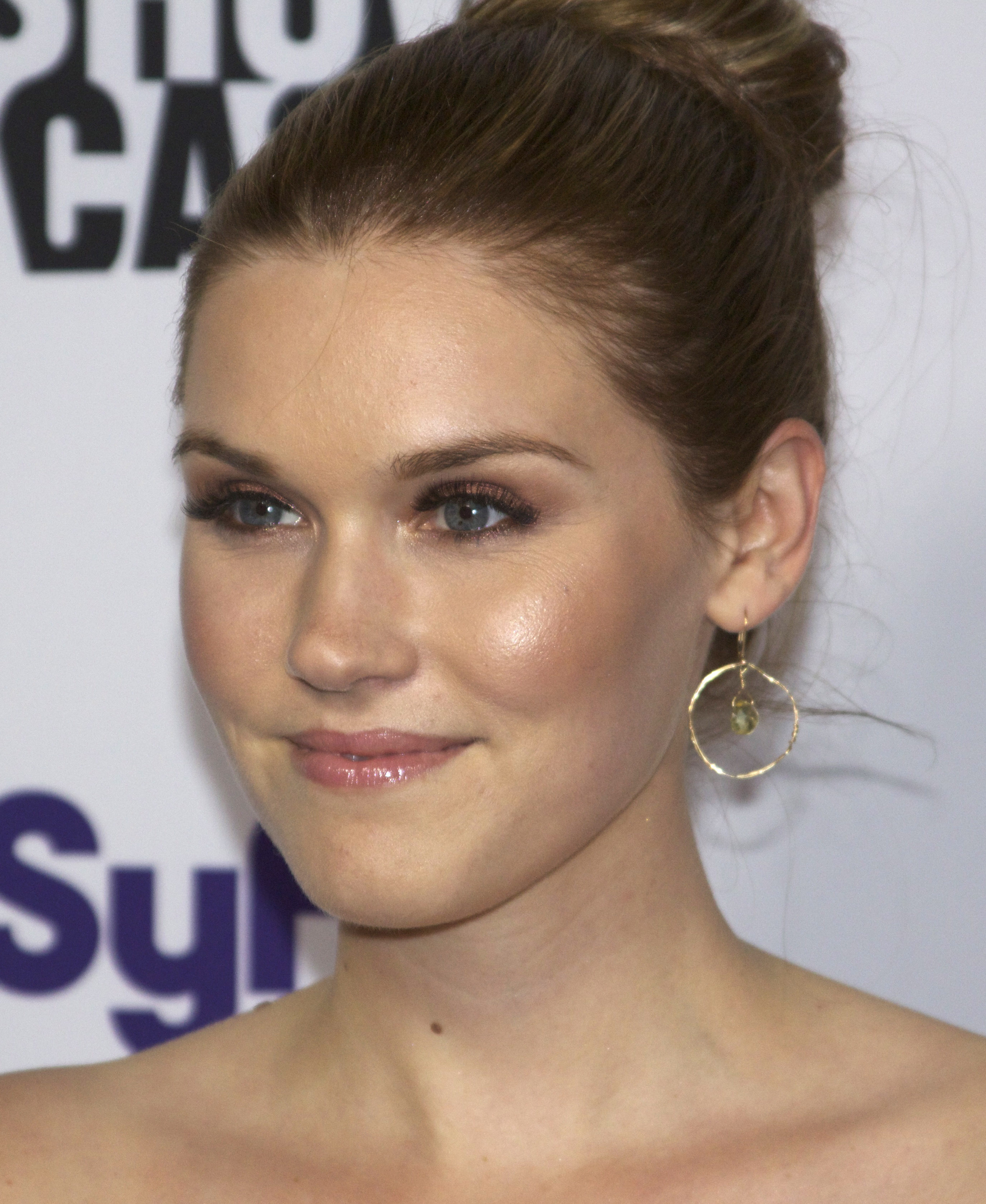
- Rose at the 2013 San Diego Comic-Con
- Education: University of California, Los Angeles (MFA)
- Years active: 2006–present
- Spouse: Dairek Morgan (m. 2009)
- Children: 3

Emily Rose is an American actress. She is best known for her role in the critically acclaimed Uncharted video game series as Elena Fisher and for her lead role as Audrey Parker in the Syfy series Haven (2010–2015).

== Early life ==
Rose received her Master of Fine Arts degree in Acting from UCLA in 2006.

== Career ==
Rose appeared in the unaired fourth episode of the American television show Smith, and starred as Cass in the HBO drama John from Cincinnati. She played Lena Branigan on Brothers & Sisters. She portrayed Trish Merrick, an employee of Jennings and Rall, on the CBS drama Jericho.

Rose performed voice acting and motion capture for the 2007 PlayStation 3 game Uncharted: Drake's Fortune as the main female character Elena Fisher, then reprised the role in Uncharted 2: Among Thieves in 2009, Uncharted 3: Drake's Deception in 2011 and Uncharted 4: A Thief's End in 2016. Rose played Dr. Tracy Martin in the final season of ER and guest-starred on the January 12, 2009, episode of Two and a Half Men.

The following year, Rose began her stint in the Syfy TV series Haven, playing the main character, FBI Special Agent Audrey Parker. The series ran through 2015. Rose's character is sent to Haven, a seemingly tranquil seaside town in Maine, to apprehend an escaped convict. As the story proceeds, she finds herself entrenched in a decades-long town mystery and ends up quitting the FBI and joining the Haven municipal police department to assist in ridding the town of its "Troubles", as the ongoing town mystery is called. The series was adapted from the Stephen King crime novel The Colorado Kid.

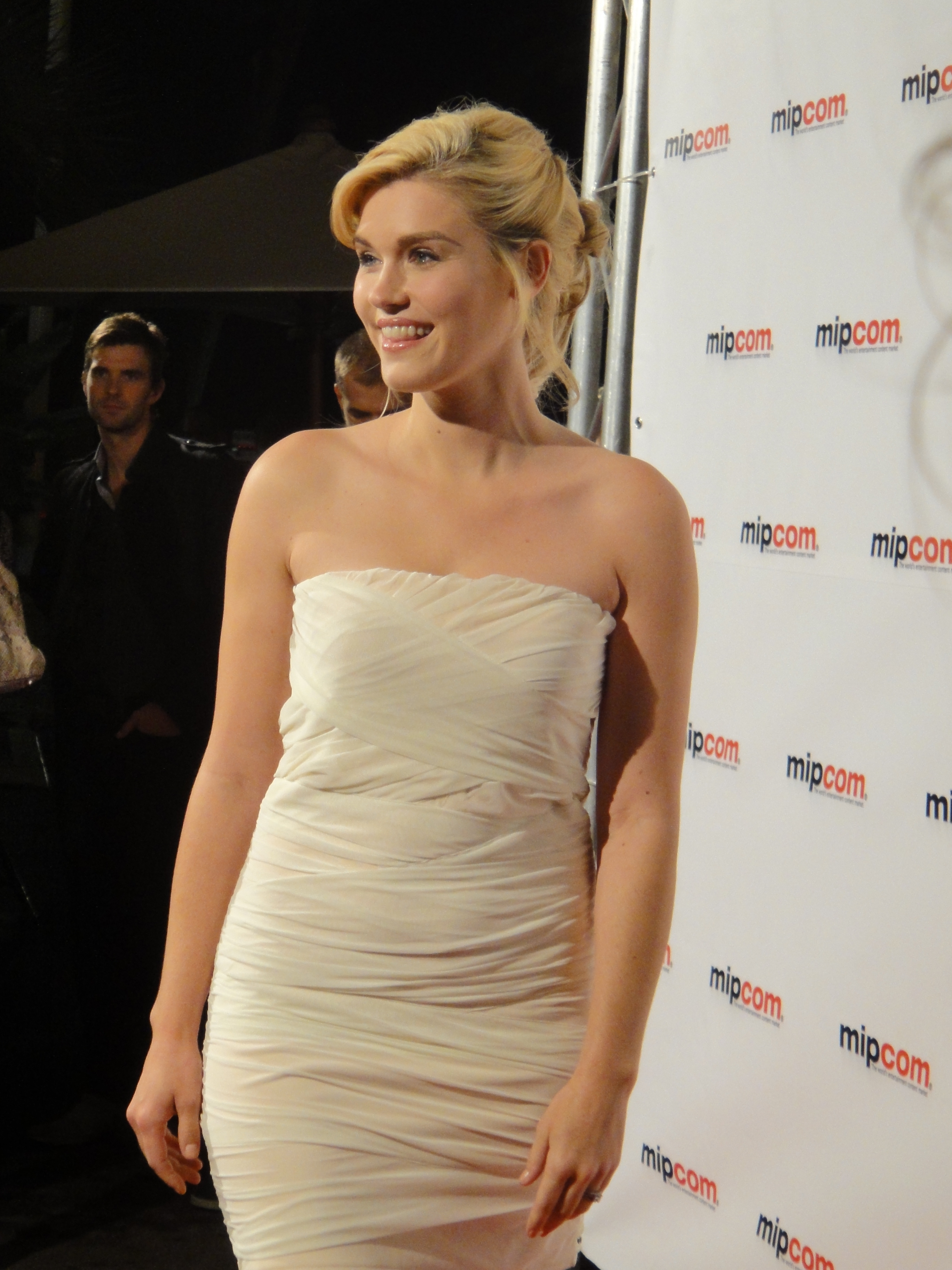
Rose in 2010

In 2018, Emily portrayed FBI Special Agent Anna Jenlowe in the NCIS episode "Third Wheel".

== Personal life ==
Rose married long-time boyfriend Dairek Morgan, a licensed marriage and family therapist, on December 6, 2009, in Washington. On January 15, 2013, Rose announced via youtube that she and her husband were expecting their first child. The tweet included a YouTube pregnancy announcement. A baby boy was born to Rose and Morgan. Rose announced via Twitter on August 25, 2015, that she and her husband were expecting their second child.

== Filmography ==
Film
Year	Title	Role	Notes
2006	Hurricane Party	Precious	Short film
2007	Speed Dating	Melanie	Short film
2008	The Orphan	Elizabeth Arnold	Short film
2008	The Last Page	Marybell	Short film
2012	Heckle or Hell	Mary Beth Struthers	Short film
2023	The Shift	Tabitha	

Television
Year	Title	Role	Notes
2007	Smith	Verna	Episode: "Four"; unaired
2007	John from Cincinnati	Cass	Main role (10 episodes)
2007–2008	Brothers & Sisters	Lena Branigan	Recurring role (10 episodes)
2008	Jericho	Trish Merrick	Recurring role (5 episodes)
2008	Cold Case	Nancy Patterson	Episode: "Slipping"
2008	Without a Trace	Anya Simonson	Episode: "Satellites"
2008–2009	ER	Dr. Tracy Martin	Recurring role (11 episodes)
2009	Operating Instructions	Dr. Lt. Comm. Rachel Scott	Television film
2009	Two and a Half Men	Janine	Episode: "Thank God for Scoliosis"
2009	Washington Field	Terri Porter	Television film
2009	Ghost Whisperer	Tina Clark	Episode: "Devil's Bargain"
2010	Private Practice	Elisha	Episode: "Fear of Flying"
2010	Perfect Plan	Lauren Baker	Television film
2010–2015	Haven	Audrey Parker / Lucy Ripley / Sarah Vernon / Lexie DeWitt / Veronica / Mara / Paige	Main role
2012	Harry's Law	Natalie	Episode: "Gorilla My Dreams"
2013	The Thanksgiving House	Mary Ross	Television film (Hallmark)
2014	Graceland	Jessica Foster	Recurring role (6 episodes)
2016	Secret Summer	Janice	Television film (Hallmark)
2017	Daughter for Sale	Annalise O'Neil	Television film
2017	An Hour Behind	Trish Harper	Television film
2017	The Killing Pact	Hayley Udall	Television film
2017	Criminal Minds	Tori Hoffstadt	Episode: "Killer App"
2018	Boyfriend's Deceit	Annie Tatum	Television film (Lifetime)
2018	Take Two	Emily Speer	Episode: "One to the Heart"
2018	NCIS	Jane / Anna Jenlowe	Episode: "Third Wheel"
2019	Private Eyes	Cassie Lewis	Episode: "The Grape Deception"
2019	Matchmaker Christmas	Maggie	Television film (Hallmark)
2023	Gotham Knights	Mrs. Hayes	Episode: "Dark Knight of the Soul"

Web
Year	Title	Role	Notes
2009	Uncharted: Eye of Indra	Elena Fisher (voice)	Motion comics

Video Games
Year	Title	Role
2007	Uncharted: Drake's Fortune	Elena Fisher
2009	Uncharted 2: Among Thieves	Elena Fisher
2011	Uncharted 3: Drake's Deception	Elena Fisher
2016	Uncharted 4: A Thief's End	Elena Fisher
2017	Horizon Zero Dawn: The Frozen Wilds	Laulai
2022	God of War Ragnarök	Sif
