= Private Eyes West Coast =

Canadian drama television series

- Genre: Drama
- Created by: Jennifer Kassabian; Sarah Dodd
- Starring: Cindy Sampson; Jason Priestley
- Opening theme: "Private Eyes" by Dear Rogue
- Country of origin: Canada
- Original language: English
- No. of seasons: 1
- No. of episodes: 6

Production
- Executive producers: Darren Giblin; Jason Priestley; Jennifer Kassabian; Jocelyn Hamilton; Lloyd Segan; Sarah Dodd; Shawn Piller
- Production location: Victoria, British Columbia
- Running time: 60 minutes
- Production companies: Pillar-Segan; Corus Entertainment; Lionsgate Television

Original release
- Network: Global TV
- Release: September 30, 2026 – present
- Network: The CW
- Release: October 5, 2026 – present

Related
- Private Eyes

Private Eyes West Coast is a Canadian drama television series that premiered on Global TV on September 30, 2026, followed by The CW on October 5, 2026. It is a spinoff of the show Private Eyes, starring returning cast members Cindy Sampson and Jason Priestley.

== Synopsis ==
The series captures all the fun, charm and adventure that made the original series a global hit while giving audiences something fresh to experience as Angie and Shade navigate a new chapter in their lives together in Victoria, British Columbia.

== Cast ==
=== Main ===
- Cindy Sampson as Angie Everett
- Jason Priestley as Matt Shade

=== Recurring ===
- Olivia Cheng as Detective Violet Xiao
- David Kaye as Will Federgreen
- Khamisa Wilsher as Raine Atebe

== Episodes ==
No.	Title	Directed by	Written by	Canada air date	U.S. air date
1	"Changing Tides"	Shawn Piller	Jennifer Kassabian & Sarah Dodd	September 30, 2026	October 5, 2026
2	"Shroom with a View"	Shawn Piller	Jennica Harper	October 7, 2026	October 12, 2026
3	"Where There's Smoke"	Jason Priestley	Vivian Lin	October 14, 2026	October 19, 2026
4	"In Too Deep"	Jason Priestley	Sarah Dodd	October 21, 2026	October 26, 2026
5	"Wavelengths"	James Genn	Jennifer Kassabian	October 28, 2026	November 2, 2026
6	"Keep it in the Family"	James Genn	Derek Schreyer	November 4, 2026	November 9, 2026
7	"Blood, Sweat and Cheers"	Shannon Kohli	Sonja Bennett	November 11, 2026	November 16, 2026
8	"Fright League"	Shannon Kohli	Corey Liu	November 18, 2026	November 23, 2026
9	"Between a Rock and a Card Place"	Alysse Leite-Rogers	Sarah Dodd & Jennifer Kassabian	November 25, 2026	November 30, 2026

== Production ==
On March 18, 2025, it was announced that a spin-off based on the Private Eyes series had entered development at Global with both Priestley and Sampson set to reprise their roles. The new series, titled Private Eyes West Coast, will see Shade and Everett relocating to Victoria, British Columbia, leading very different lives while encountering a world of different cases along with a new group of friends. Corus Entertainment renewed the show for a second season in December 2025.

In April 2026, The CW picked up the series for release in the United States. The series premiered in Canada on Global TV on September 30, 2026, and premiered in the United States on The CW on October 5, 2026.
