= Lloyd Segan =

American film producer

- Born: United States
- Education: Allegheny College
- Occupations: Film producer, television producer
- Spouse: Allison Lyon Segan

Lloyd Segan is an American film and television producer, and executive producer and partner at Piller/Segan, an independent content production company.

== Television production ==
Segan made his foray into television in 2001 with The Dead Zone based on Stephen King's novel of the same name. Executive produced by Segan and Michael Piller, the series debuted on June 16, 2002, on the USA Network. The series, produced over a 7 year production cycle is now syndicated globally.

Following The Dead Zone, Segan, Michael Piller and Shawn Piller executive-produced Wildfire. This series, which debuted on ABC Family, was the network’s first-ever original scripted series. Wildfire ended after four seasons and audiences petitioned for the show to remain on the air by sending truckloads of hay, 500 cast iron horseshoes, apples, rope, and 1,000 pounds of carrots to ABC Family.

In 2007, Segan and Shawn Piller executive-produced the ABC Family series, Greek. In a review released soon after the premiere of the show, The New York Times claimed that Greek "captures the spirit of the hedge-fund age like nothing else." Greek ran for a 6-season cable cycle and brought the network a new audience demographic that it had not attracted before.

Segan served as an executive producer on Syfy’s one-hour drama series Haven which stars Emily Rose (ER). The series was the first to be co-production between NBC Universal Global Networks, Syfy, and Shaw Media. During its first season, Haven, based on the novella The Colorado Kid by Stephen King, was called “A must-see show” by Entertainment Weekly. "Haven" spanned for six cable cycles on Syfy.

Segan currently serves as executive producer on the CBC / CW series Wild Cards.

== Film production ==
Segan produced the Scott Lew-penned and Shawn Piller-directed Sexy Evil Genius starring Seth Green, Katee Sackhoff, Michelle Trachtenberg and Harold Perrineau.

Segan’s other feature film credits include 2006's Bickford Shmeckler's Cool Ideas, a college-set comedy starring Patrick Fugit and Olivia Wilde; New Line Cinema's Bones, a hip-hop horror film starring Snoop Dogg; New Line's The Bachelor, starring Chris O’Donnell and Renée Zellweger; the controversial cult hit The Boondock Saints, and its follow-up The Boondock Saints II: All Saints Day, starring Willem Dafoe; Showtime’s Emmy-nominated film, Hendrix, based on the life of Jimi Hendrix; the Eric Schaeffer comedy Wirey Spindell; Universal Studios' thriller Judgment Night, starring Emilio Estevez, Cuba Gooding Jr., Denis Leary and Stephen Dorff; MGM’s action-drama Blown Away with Jeff Bridges and Tommy Lee Jones; and the HBO movie Crossworlds.

== Personal life ==
Before becoming a producer, Segan was a programming executive at NBC, then a motion picture and literary agent at InterTalent Agency, where he represented leading film directors and writers.

Segan is married to former Disney executive and critically acclaimed producer Allison Lyon Segan, and together they have two daughters. He earned his BA at Allegheny College. He also holds a Master of Professional Studies from New York University and a JD degree from Whittier College.

== Filmography ==
He was a producer in all films unless otherwise noted.

=== Film ===
Year	Film	Credit	Distributor
1993	Judgment Night	Executive producer	Universal Pictures
1994	Blown Away	Executive producer	Metro-Goldwyn-Mayer
1996	Crossworlds		Trimark Pictures
1999	The Boondock Saints		Indican Pictures
1999	Wirey Spindell		WinStar Cinema
1999	The Bachelor		New Line Cinema
2001	Bones		New Line Cinema
2006	Bickford Shmeckler's Cool Ideas		Screen Media Films
2009	The Boondock Saints II: All Saints Day	Executive producer	Apparition
2013	Sexy Evil Genius		Lionsgate

Thanks

Year	Film	Role
1989	A Nightmare on Elm Street 5: The Dream Child	Special thanks

=== Television ===
Year refers to air dates and does not reflect series exhibition cycles.

Year	Title	Credit	Notes
2000	Hendrix	Executive producer	Television film
2005	Wildfire	Executive producer	
2002−07	The Dead Zone	Executive producer	
2008	Wildfire Webisodes	Executive producer	
2007−11	Greek	Executive producer	
2012	Eric Schaeffer: Life Coach	Executive producer	
2013	Inside Haven	Executive producer	Documentary
2014−15	Haven: Origins	Executive producer	
2010−15	Haven	Executive producer	
2017	Sea Change	Executive producer	Television film
2016−21	Private Eyes	Executive producer	
2024-	Wild Cards	Executive producer	
