= Cindy Sampson =

Canadian film and television actress and director (born 1978)

- Born: May 27, 1978 (age 48); Halifax, Nova Scotia, Canada
- Occupations: Actress, Director
- Years active: 1989–present
- Spouse: Ryan Wickel (m. 2016)
- Children: 1

Cindy Marie Sampson (born May 27, 1978) is a Canadian director and actress (film and television). She is known for her role in the Canadian television series Private Eyes.

== Biography ==
Sampson was born in Halifax, Nova Scotia, Canada on May 27, 1978. She attended Randolph Academy for the Performing Arts, training in dance and theatre.

In February 2012 she traveled to Bouvet Island in the South Atlantic Ocean, the most remote island on Earth, and climbed to the island's summit while filming the "docu-fiction" movie Expedition for the Future.

She married fellow Canadian Ryan Wickel on July 7, 2016. Their daughter was born in January 2022.

== Career ==
=== Films ===
Sampson's biggest film role was as Zoe Ravena in Live Once, Die Twice. For the film The Shrine, Sampson was required to watch a specific list of horror films in preparation for the role. She also appeared in the crime thriller film The Factory. Sampson was cast by Hank White to play Kelly Stone in his feature film Charlie Zone.

=== Television ===
Sampson appeared in season 3 of Supernatural as the character Lisa Braedon, in the episode "The Kids Are Alright" in 2007. She reprised the role for the episode "Dream a Little Dream of Me." Sampson's character was brought back in the fifth-season episodes "99 Problems" and "Swan Song" as setup to season six, in which she appeared in 11 episodes. Her final appearance was in the episode "Let It Bleed" (season 6, episode 21).

In 2015, Sampson appeared in three episodes of Rookie Blue, a Canadian police drama television series starring Missy Peregrym and Gregory Smith, followed by eight episodes as Sophie Hale in the third season of the Canadian-British co-production Rogue, which stars Thandie Newton and Cole Hauser.

In 2016 the Global Television Network launched the TV series Private Eyes, in which Sampson stars as Angie Everett, an experienced private investigator who takes on an ex-hockey player, Matt Shade (Jason Priestley), as a junior partner. She also directed one episode of the series.

Sampson's other appearances include Reaper, The Last Kiss, Being Human, Footsteps, Proof of Lies, Pretty Dead Flowers, and Swamp Devil. She also portrayed Sandra MacLaren in Rumours as well as the "Strong Brushing Arm" woman in a commercial spot for Listerine mouthwash, and appeared in a recurring role as Jane on Sullivan's Crossing.

== Filmography ==
=== Film ===
Year	Title	Role	Notes
1999	New Jersey Turnpikes	Cheerleader	
2001	Riches	Molly McBride	Short
2001	Slug	Unknown	Short
2002	Mama Africa	Molly McBride	
2002	Lift-Off	Cynth	Short
2006	Pretty Dead Flowers	Rebekah Stern	Short
2006	The Last Kiss	Danielle	
2008	Swamp Devil	Melanie Blaime	
2009	My Claudia	Hailey	Short
2010	The Shrine	Carmen	
2011	Charlie Zone	Kelly	
2012	Trust Me	Jill	Short
2012	Camion	Jade	
2012	The Factory	Crystal	
2013	Long Gone Day	Layna	
2014	Elephant Song	Christelle	
2014	Wings of the Dragon	Lisa Pohlman	
2019	Sila	Florence Fonseca	Short
2020	The Robbery	Susan	Short (Post-Production)
2026	Surfacing	Jessica McCall	

=== Television ===
Year	Title	Role	Notes
1999	Lexx	Guard #4	Episode: "Woz"
2001	Lexx	Druid Girl	Episode: "A Midsummer's Nightmare"
2002	A Guy and a Girl	Sheila	Unknown
2003	Sex and the Single Mom	April Gradwell	TV movie
2003	Footsteps	Jordan Hayes	TV movie
2004	The Riverman	Marisol	TV movie
2005	Jesse Stone: Stone Cold	Barbara Carey	TV movie
2006	Live Once, Die Twice	Zoe Ravena	TV movie
2006	Proof of Lies	Tracy Morgan	TV movie
2006	October 1970	Sylvie	Miniseries
2006–2007	Rumours	Sandra MacLaren	8 episodes; Recurring role (season 1)
2007	Mein Traum von Afrika	Yolanda	TV movie
2007	Blind Trust	Diane Summers	TV movie
2007–2008; 2010–2011	Supernatural	Lisa Braeden	11 episodes; Guest role (Seasons 3, 5–6)
2008	Reaper	Marlena	Episode: "Cancun"
2008	The Christmas Choir	Jill Crosby	TV movie
2009	Durham County	Molly Crocker	5 episodes; Guest role (season 2)
2009	High Plains Invaders	Abigail Pixley	TV movie
2011	Being Human	Cindy Lanham	2 episodes; Guest role (season 1)
2013	Played	Ellen Vaughn	Episode: "Cars"
2014	The Listener	Vanessa Reinhold	Episode: "Game Over"
2014–2015	Degrassi: The Next Generation	Andrea	2 episodes; Guest role (Seasons 13-14)
2015	Rookie Blue	Jamie Toth	3 episodes; Guest role (season 6)
2015–2016	Rogue	Sophie Hale	8 episodes; Main role (season 3)
2015–2016	The Art of More	Clarissa Hewitt	8 episodes; Recurring role (Seasons 1-2)
2016	Real Detective	Linda Hamilton	2 episodes; Guest role (season 1)
2016–2021	Private Eyes	Angie Everett	Main role
2018	My Secret Valentine	Taylor	TV movie
2018	Imposters	Erica	Episode: "Old Unresolved Shit"
2018	Hudson & Rex	Rosalynn Evans	Episode: "Art of Darkness"
2019	A Christmas Crush	Addie	TV movie
2020	A Christmas Break	Addison Tate	Lifetime Movie
2021	The Bold Type	Nicole Keating	2 episodes
2023	Royally Yours This Christmas	Neve	TV movie
2023	The Spencer Sisters	Candace Buchanan	1 episode
2024-2025	Sullivan's Crossing	Jane	9 episodes
2026–present	Private Eyes West Coast	Angie Everett	Main role
