= Private Eyes (TV series) =

2016 Canadian comedy-drama television series

- Genre: Detective fiction; Comedy drama; Crime; Whodunnit
- Created by: Tim Kilby; Shelley Eriksen
- Based on: The Code by G.B. Joyce
- Starring: Jason Priestley; Cindy Sampson
- Opening theme: "Private Eyes" by Dear Rouge
- Country of origin: Canada
- Original language: English
- No. of seasons: 5
- No. of episodes: 60

Production
- Executive producers: Shelley Eriksen; Alan McCullough; John Morayniss; Rachel Fulford; Tecca Crosby; Shawn Piller; Lloyd Segan; Tassie Cameron; Kelly Makin; Jason Priestley
- Running time: 43–45 minutes
- Production companies: Piller/Segan; Shaw Media (season 1); Corus Entertainment (season 2–5); Entertainment One Television

Original release
- Network: Global
- Release: May 26, 2016 – August 26, 2021

Related
- Private Eyes West Coast

Private Eyes (during production first known as The Code) is a Canadian comedy-drama television series based on the novel The Code by G.B. Joyce, created by Tim Kilby and Shelley Eriksen starring Jason Priestley and Cindy Sampson as the two protagonist private investigators solving crimes in Toronto.

In Canada, the series' first season of ten episodes premiered on May 26, 2016, on Global. Seasons two (split into two nine-episode batches) and three were shown in Canada each summer from 2017 to 2019. The fourth season premiered in November 2020. In the United States, the series premiered on February 11, 2018, on Ion Television.

The fifth and final season premiered on July 7, 2021, on Global and premiered on Ion Plus on February 23, 2023.

== Cast ==
=== Main ===
- Jason Priestley as Matthew Kevin "Matt" ("Shadow") Shade, a hockey player turned private investigator.
- Cindy Sampson as Angelina Susan "Angie" Everett, Shade's feisty boss and later P.I. agency partner at Everett Investigations. She inherited the agency after the death of her father.

=== Recurring ===
- Barry Flatman as Don Shade, Matt's father, a retired electrician who now owns the Red Bird Diner.
- Jordyn Negri as Juliet "Jules" Shade, Matt's visually impaired daughter.
- Clé Bennett as Detective Derek Nolan (seasons 1–2), a police detective who is initially antagonistic towards Angie.
- Ennis Esmer as Detective Kurtis "Maz" Mazhari (seasons 1–3, 5), an old friend of Angie's who often helps her and Matt in their investigations.
- Nicole de Boer as Becca D'Orsay, Matt's ex-wife, Jules's mother, and host of a TV breakfast show.
- Jonny Gray as Liam Benson, Jules's boyfriend.
- Bree Williamson as Melanie Parker (season 2), a Crown prosecutor who hired Angie and Matt in the episode "The P.I. Code" to investigate jury tampering, later started dating Matt until the episode "Getaway With Murder."
- Mark Ghanimé as Dr. Ken Graham (season 2), Angie's ex-fiancé who appeared in the episode "Between a Doc and a Hard Place." They start dating again at the end of the episode and Angie finds Ken's engagement ring, discovering his plans to propose to her, but keeps this secret to herself. He officially proposes to her in the episode "Getaway With Murder," but she turns him down.
- Samantha Wan as Zoe Chow (seasons 2–5), a former client whom Angie hires as a secretary.
- Sharnon Lewis as Shona Clement (seasons 2–3), former owner of the Red Bird Diner.
- Kris Lemche as Deputy Eddy Conroy (seasons 2–4).
- Ruth Goodwin as Danica Powers (seasons 3–5), a rookie policewoman who works under Maz's supervision. She is later promoted to detective.
- Linda Kash as Inspector Mathilda Carlson (seasons 3–4), Maz and Danica's superior officer.
- Brett Donahue as Tex Clarkson (seasons 3–5), a private investigator from Seattle who encounters Angie and Shade after temporarily losing his memory. He has a long-distance romance with Angie. They break up after he asks to move in with Angie and she realises she is not ready for a serious relationship.
- Supinder Wraich as Kate Bashwa (season 4), Danica's girlfriend and later wife.
- Keshia Chanté as Mia (seasons 4–5), a paramedic and a friend of Angie.
- Elyse Levesque as Willow Maitland (season 4), an actress who briefly dates Shade after meeting him at a celebrity golf tournament.
- Kandyse McClure as Jada Berry (season 5), Angie's former high school nemesis turned school principal. She begins a relationship with Shade.

=== Guest stars ===
- Mimi Kuzyk as Nora Everett, Angie's mother, a former gambler and small time con (seasons 1–5).
- Adam Copeland as Ben Fisk
- William Shatner as Norm Glinski, a rival P.I. and old nemesis of Angie (season 2–3).
- Lucas Bryant as Sergeant Ellis (season 2–3)
- Colin Ferguson as Dominic Chambers (season 2–3) a con man who worked with Dana to distract Matt by pretending to be the brother of an old teammate while Dana uses Angie.
- Laura Vandervoort as Dana Edson (season 2–3).
- Charlotte Arnold as Jen
- Doug Gilmour as himself
- Daniel Negreanu as himself
- Kardinal Offishall as himself
- James Hinchcliffe as himself

== Production and broadcast ==
A second season was confirmed and production started in fall 2016 in Toronto. On March 27, 2017, Ion Television picked up the exclusive rights to broadcast the series in the United States, where it is presented as an original series for the network, airing new episodes Tuesday nights with a rebroadcast episode on Sunday nights. The first half of the second season premiered in Canada on May 25, 2017, and concluded on July 20, 2017. The second half premiered on May 27, 2018 and concluded on July 29, 2018. On September 21, 2017, Global ordered a 12-episode third season set to start airing in spring 2019. On May 30, 2019, the day after season three premiered, Global renewed the series for a 12-episode fourth season to air in summer 2020. Production on the fourth season began in July 2019. Global and eOne announced on October 1, 2020 that season 5 production started for 8 new episodes to air in 2021. The season 5 limitation of only 8 episodes is due to the COVID-19 pandemic in Canada. In June 2021 it was announced the show would conclude with the fifth season.

=== Syndication ===
As of January 2021, Private Eyes is distributed internationally to 180 territories as well as on-line streaming.

=== Vehicle ===
Throughout the series, Shade drives a silver '69 Porsche 911T. The car has a personalized licence plate SHADE 17.

== Episodes ==
=== Series overview ===
Season	Episodes		Originally released	
Season	Episodes		First released	Last released
1	10		May 26, 2016	July 28, 2016
2	18	9	May 25, 2017	July 20, 2017
2	18	9	May 27, 2018	July 29, 2018
3	12		May 29, 2019	August 7, 2019
4	12		November 2, 2020	February 4, 2021
5	8		July 7, 2021	August 26, 2021

=== Season 1 (2016) ===
No. overall	No. in season	Title	Directed by	Written by	Original release date	Prod. code	Canadian viewers (millions)
1	1	"The Code"	Kelly Makin	Tim Kilby & Shelley Eriksen	May 26, 2016	272778-1	1.44
Matt "Shadow" Shade, a former pro hockey player, connects with private detective Angie Everett to solve a case of his protege's career being sabotaged.
2	2	"Mise En Place"	Kelly Makin	Alan McCullough	June 2, 2016	272778-2	1.36
When an old friend of Shade's finds the body of a celebrity chef and is not sure how she got there, he and Angie must work while avoiding an antagonistic detective to clear the friend's name and find the real murderer. Meanwhile, Shade's daughter Jules wants to get a braille tattoo.
3	3	"The Money Shot"	Anne Wheeler	Tara Armstrong	June 9, 2016	272778-3	1.06
Shade and Angie are called to investigate a suspected diamond heist, which turns out to be the disappearance of a prized race horse. Things take an interesting turn when Angie's mother Nora turns up and must deal with her bookie. Shade finally takes the PI exam.
4	4	"The Devil's Playground"	Shawn Piller	Derek Schreyer	June 16, 2016	272778-4	1.23
When a famous author is a victim of arson, Shade and Angie follow several leads including the author's estranged daughter and two male fashion designers who are not what they seem. Meanwhile, Shade and Jules clash over her new study partner/boyfriend Liam.
5	5	"The Six"	Charles Officer	Tassie Cameron & Marsha Greene	June 23, 2016	272778-5	0.93
In Toronto's hip-hop scene, full of ego and unreliable witnesses, Shade and Angie must find, and try to protect, a 14-year-old witness to a violent nightclub shooting. Meanwhile, Shade drives himself crazy and irks Angie, trying to find out which mystery man Angie spent the night with, while simultaneously struggling to keep a promise to Jules.
6	6	"Partners in Crime"	Robert Lieberman	Tim Kilby	June 30, 2016	272778-6	0.95
When Angie's friend is bankrupted by identity thieves, she and Shade discover the thief uses speed dating events to gather personal information quickly, so they go in as customers, with a side wager as to who can get the most date requests. Meanwhile, fearing that Jules is pulling away from him, Shade shops for parenting books at a bookstore where he ends up meeting a woman.
7	7	"Karaoke Confidential"	Jerry Ciccoritti	Shelley Eriksen & Derek Schreyer	July 7, 2016	272778-7	0.92
Shade accepts a client without asking Angie: Jay, the owner of a karaoke bar who suspects he is being followed after his friend disappeared. Angie is skeptical, especially after they quickly discover that Jay is a drug dealer. While he maintains his innocence, he isn't very forthcoming. But as Shade and Angie put the pieces together, they realize Jay is trapped between a kingpin and a shady cop. Meanwhile, Jules is excited when some high-school seniors become her friends, but she soon learns some hard lessons about friendship.
8	8	"I Do, I Do"	Robert Lieberman	Marcus Robinson	July 14, 2016	272778-8	0.86
Shade and Angie are hired by a distressed husband to confirm whether his wife has a stalker. Meanwhile, Jules' mother/Shade's ex-wife, Becca, returns from Italy and stays with them, causing some turbulence in the Shade household.
9	9	"Disappearing Act"	Kelly Makin	Alan McCullough & Marsha Greene	July 21, 2016	272778-9	0.93
Detective Mazhari (Maz) asks Angie to find a magician who vanished from police custody and prevent any fallout. Meanwhile, Becca confirms she's staying in Toronto and starts complicating Shade's life when she lines up a gig co-hosting a show together.
10	10	"Family Jewels"	James Genn	Shelley Eriksen	July 28, 2016	272778-10	0.88
Angie's cousin's wedding is disrupted when the groom's heirloom tiara is stolen. Nora (Angie's mother) is the police's prime suspect. Angie doesn't want to get involved but Shade sets out to prove Nora's innocence. Meanwhile, Becca starts manipulating Shade into a new unfair custody agreement for Jules that restricts his time with her, and he must decide how much of the truth to reveal to Jules. Angie goes on vacation with detective Nolan, giving Shade the keys to her father's office. Inside, he falls off his chair and finds an envelope from her father taped under the desk.

=== Season 2 (2017–18) ===
No. overall	No. in season	Title	Directed by	Written by	Original release date	Prod. code	Canadian viewers (millions)
11	1	"The Extra Mile"	Jason Priestley	Alan McCullough	May 25, 2017	272778-11	0.87
Angie returns from vacation to find Shade being thrown out of the agency's window, and learns that he has a new case. His friend's racing team has suffered a rash of vandalism to their property, and the skilled driver has been receiving death threats. While investigating the world of racing, they learn that the case ties to a hit-and-run from months earlier, and that there are more secrets than anyone realized. Shade meanwhile comes to terms with the new custody arrangement Becca has forced on him, but realizes she may not have Jules's well-being at heart. Angie is given the letter that Shade found under his desk, and discovers a key inside. Guest star: James Hinchcliffe
12	2	"Boardwalk Empire"	Rob Lieberman	Marcus Robinson	June 1, 2017	272778-12	0.87
Angie and Shade are called by Zoe Chow, a resident of a small building who thinks someone is moving her things around while she's away to spook her. They are skeptical upon realizing she has no money to pay them, but when other residents report similar issues, they begin to suspect the building manager is trying to force them out as part of a blockbusting scheme. Meanwhile, Don is offered a retirement package and must determine whether he wants to take it. Angie finds the key belongs to a safety deposit box, and gets a surprise from her father. In the end, Zoe is hired by Everett Investigations as an assistant.
13	3	"The Frame Job"	Gail Harvey	Thomas Pound	June 8, 2017	272778-13	0.79
The principal of Jules's private school asks Shade to determine the validity of an allegation that a female teacher is in a sexual relationship with a student, before she has to report it to the board of directors. Things initially don't look good, but they soon suspect the work of an elusive school club. Meanwhile, Shade meets Jules’s new boyfriend, Liam, while Zoe tries to hide a hole she made in the agency's wall.
14	4	"Crimes of Fashion"	Shawn Piller	Tim Kilby	June 15, 2017	272778-14	0.88
Becca sets Everett Investigations up with a simple job: escort new clothing for a fashion show she's reporting on for an up-and-coming designer. However, the vehicle transporting the clothes gets hijacked, and Shade and Angie now have 48 hours to find the clothing to save the designer’s future, Becca's career, and their own reputation. They soon realize they are not the only ones searching and that the van may have been stolen for something other than the clothes.
15	5	"Now You See Her"	Kelly Makin	James Thorpe	June 22, 2017	272778-15	0.83
A brilliant orchestra conductor hires Shade and Angie to find his missing fiancée. But there’s a catch: she died one year ago. On the trail of a ghost, Shade and Angie unearth a dark secret with fatal implications for everyone involved.
16	6	"The P.I. Code"	Sudz Sutherland	Derek Schreyer	June 29, 2017	272778-16	0.93
Crown Prosecutor Mel Parker hires Shade and Angie to investigate jury tampering during a high-profile murder case. The suspect is Norm Glinski, a rival PI who once worked for Angie's father, who claims the defendant is innocent. After Shade and Angie find evidence supporting Glinski's theory, Mel fires them from the case. With Glinski's help, they uncover the real murderer and exonerate the defendant. Afterwards, sparks fly between Mel and Shade. Meanwhile, Don struggles to balance his new personal and business relationships.
17	7	"Between a Doc and a Hard Place"	Kelly Makin	Jackie May	July 6, 2017	272778-17	0.97
Angie and Shade are hired to find out who's targeting a pro bono medical clinic run by Dr. Ken Graham, a former flame of Angie's. Angie believes Ken is a victim, but Shade suspects Ken is hiding something. Shade is reluctant to go public about his relationship with Mel, causing friction between them. After the case is solved, Angie and Ken resume their relationship, and Shade and Mel reconcile.
18	8	"Six Feet Blunder"	Jill Carter	Katrina Saville	July 13, 2017	272778-18	0.87
Shade and Angie are hired to find a missing body, but they wind up uncovering a scheme to bury millions of dollars. Angie walks out on Ken after discovering her old engagement ring in his drawer.
19	9	"The Good Soldier"	Lee Rose	Alan McCullough	July 20, 2017	272778-19	1.04
Shade and Angie investigate the case of a missing army cadet. Jules makes plans to study abroad and Shade worries whether she can take care of herself so far away from home. Angie and Ken reconcile and decide to take things slow, and Mel meets Shade's family.
20	10	"Kissing the Canvas"	James Genn	James Thorpe	May 27, 2018	272778-20	0.92
When a boxer asks Shade to prove a match was fixed, Shade and Angie bring Nora in as a gambling adviser. The case reunites Shade with a former manager who stole most of his money, reopening old wounds. Zoe and Maz try to get closer, but with mixed results.
21	11	"Long Live the King"	Charles Officer	Thomas Pound	June 3, 2018	272778-21	0.95
Shade and Angie go undercover when the king from a Medieval Show believes someone is out to take his throne by whatever means necessary. At first it looks like he suffers from mental illness, but looking into his former job at a toy company reveals a deeper secret that makes him look less paranoid than expected. Note: The Medieval Show shown in this episode bears similarities to Medieval Times, a popular attraction in Toronto (and elsewhere).
22	12	"Getaway With Murder"	James Genn	Marcus Robinson	June 10, 2018	272778-22	1.10
Shade and Angie are hired by the owner of a luxurious rustic lodge to investigate an infidelity case, but the suspected adulterer ends up dead. Shade and Angie clear his name and expose a more complicated scheme. Zoe and Maz are set up on a blind date to an escape room by Shade and Angie. Angie turns down Ken's marriage proposal, and Mel breaks up with Shade.
23	13	"A Fare to Remember"	Anne Wheeler	Tim Kilby	June 17, 2018	272778-23	1.22
After a routine sting operation that finds him driving a taxi, Shade picks up an unexpected fare from a murder suspect who takes him hostage. Sensing that he may be innocent, Shade takes him on as a client, while Angie looks into the case from the outside, finding the real culprit and nearly getting killed in the process.
24	14	"Finding Leroy" "The Wife Aquatic"	Eleanore Lindo	Katrina Saville	June 24, 2018	272778-24	1.19
Shade and Angie discover the high-paced world of black market exotic animal trafficking when Maz's sister Sila comes to them for help to recover a critically endangered octopus that has gone missing from Ripley's Aquarium. Jules is forced to rethink her relationship with Liam as she prepares to study abroad.
25	15	"The Hills Have Eyes"	Anne Wheeler	Derek Schreyer	July 8, 2018	272778-25	1.09
A young boy with a drone obsession reports his substitute teacher missing, thinking she was murdered by her next-door neighbour. While investigating, Shade and Angie uncover a drug-dealing operation and find out that things aren't always what they seem in this suburban community. Meanwhile, Don enlists Zoe's help to track down Shona's estranged son so that she can reconnect.
26	16	"Look Who's Stalking"	Sudz Sutherland	Jackie May	July 15, 2018	272778-26	1.03
As Becca tries to transition from talk show host to serious newscaster, she starts receiving threats that seem to come from the person who stalked her years previously, when she was a meteorologist for a different TV channel. Becca hires Shade and Angie, who investigate several possibilities, before exposing the real stalker and a shady deal involving a recycling program and a mayoral campaign. Meanwhile, a blood drive at the police department exposes Maz's fear of needles and Zoe tries to help him overcome his fear.
27	17	"Brew The Right Thing"	James Genn	James Thorpe & Kim Morrison	July 22, 2018	272778-27	1.25
Shade and Angie are hired by a pair of brothers who are concerned that someone is trying to sabotage their craft brewery, which recently won an award. What at first looked like simple corporate espionage gives way to something more sinister fermenting in the suds, as the decades-old mystery of the disappearance of the brothers' father comes to light. Jules realizes she still has feelings for Liam after talking to Zoe at the diner, and she and Liam have a heart-to-heart near the end of the episode.
28	18	"Shadow of a Doubt"	Shawn Piller	Alan McCullough	July 29, 2018	272778-28	1.14
Shade and Angie's partnership is tested when a client named Dana hires them to recover a hard drive containing illegally obtained personal photos from her former workplace. Meanwhile, Dominic, who says he is the brother of Shade's hockey buddy from many years ago, enlists his help to steal back a meaningful (and expensive) hockey puck from his ex-wife's boyfriend. Turns out it was all a front to steal a hard drive full of Canadian state secrets, and Angie gets arrested for espionage. What will happen to her? Guess we'll find out next season!

=== Season 3 (2019) ===
No. overall	No. in season	Title	Directed by	Written by	Original release date	Prod. code	Canadian viewers (millions)
29	1	"Catch Me If You Can"	Shawn Piller	Alan McCullough	May 29, 2019	272778-44	1.12
Angie's in jail for stealing a hard drive with state secrets on it, after falling for a client's false story meant to play on her emotions. While evading the federal investigator trying to find evidence to prove Shade was an accessory to the theft, Angie and Shade work to catch the real thieves and prove Angie's innocence. Once the main plot resolves, Angie helps another inmate (guest star Jann Arden) get legal representation to prove her innocence and tracks down her daughter to prove that some people do care about others.
30	2	"Full Court Press"	Shawn Piller	Katrina Saville	June 5, 2019	272778-45	0.95
A basketball player asks Angie and Shade to investigate when his wife is caught on film apparently having an affair. Maz and Zoe decide to break up.
31	3	"Cut and Run"	James Genn	Alexandra Zarowny	June 12, 2019	272778-46	1.02
Nora is back with a beau who hires Shade and Angie after his clinic's database is hacked. Shade learns just what Jules has been up to in Italy.
32	4	"The Life of Riley"	James Genn	Derek Schreyer	June 19, 2019	272778-47	1.11
A motorcycle shop owned by one of Angie's acquaintances is vandalized and she and Shade must uncover the culprit. Don becomes full owner of the Red Bird after Shona moves to Trinidad to be with her son. Maz is forced to mentor an enthusiastic young rookie officer.
33	5	"The Grape Deception"	Eleanore Lindo	Marcus Robinson	June 25, 2019	272778-48	0.98
Angie's college roommate calls for help when a bottle of wine is stolen. Shade has trouble dealing with how Jules has changed during her time in Italy.
34	6	"Hog Day Afternoon" "So You Think You Can Kill!"	Jason Priestley	James Thorpe	June 26, 2019	272778-50	1.07
Angie and Shade end up in the middle of a hostage situation in a high-rise office.
35	7	"Dance, Dance Retribution" "She Slices, He Dices"	Eleanore Lindo	Tim Kilby	July 3, 2019	272778-49	0.95
When Becca calls on Shade and Angie to investigate a series of potentially supernatural accidents that threaten to derail her new TV special, the PIs find themselves dancing their way through the cutthroat world of reality television.
36	8	"The Conroy Curse"	Anne Wheeler	Story by : Aaron Bala; Teleplay by : Katrina Saville	July 10, 2019	272778-51	1.07
Deputy Conroy needs Angie and Shade's help with a murder case. As Shade and the deputy look for clues, they are captured and locked in a container, and have to fight for their lives while Angie and officer Powers solve the case.
37	9	"It Happened One Fight"	Anne Wheeler	Shannon Masters	July 17, 2019	272778-52	1.22
Angie and Shade investigate the mysterious collapse of Zoe's cousin, a rising young martial artist. With her office and residence under repair, Angie stays in Shade's houses' spare bedroom and while talking on the couch Angie and Shade almost kiss, before they are interrupted by Don arriving home.
38	10	"Tex Therapy"	Sudz Sutherland	Alexandra Zarowny	July 24, 2019	272778-53	1.12
Shade and Angie investigate Tex, a charming man with amnesia who may be linked to an expensive art heist. They find themselves at a couples' retreat where the clients and staff come under suspicion.
39	11	"Aye, Aye, Tonya"	Sudz Sutherland	Tim Kilby & Derek Schreyer	July 31, 2019	272778-54	1.09
Shade and Angie think they're uncovering a simple case of infidelity when they're swept onto the high seas aboard a pirate-themed cruise ship where costumes, treasure, and eye patches are just a cover for a more insidious drug-smuggling scheme. Angie's romance with Tex heats up.
40	12	"Glazed and Confused"	Gail Harvey	James Thorpe	August 7, 2019	272778-55	1.35
After an attempt on his life, Angie's long-time nemesis Norm Glinski fakes his own death, and hires her and Shade to investigate who might be after him. Danica is promoted to detective. Angie debates whether to leave town to visit Tex. Shade encounters a surprise ending when a woman claiming to be his daughter shows up. Guest star: Colin Mochrie

=== Season 4 (2020–21) ===
No. overall	No. in season	Title	Directed by	Written by	Original release date	Prod. code	Canadian viewers (millions)
41	1	"Family Plot"	Shawn Piller	James Thorpe	November 2, 2020	272778-56	0.91
Shade learns more about Sabrina, his newly-revealed daughter, and becomes reacquainted with her mother, an old flame. Shade and Angie investigate a rash of near-fatal accidents involving a wealthy business magnate, which may be murder attempts. In the end, Shade discovers he is not Sabrina's biological father, but parts with her and her mother on amicable terms.
42	2	"Gumbo for Hire"	Samir Rehem	Alexandra Zarowny	November 9, 2020	272778-57	1.02
After Don opens a new food truck at a local festival, he is framed for armed robbery. To clear his name, Shade and Angie must find the real culprit.
43	3	"The P.I. Vanishes"	Cindy Sampson	Katrina Saville	November 16, 2020	272778-58	1.15
On her way to a romantic getaway with Tex, Angie is kidnapped. Shade and Tex team up to find her and help her stop the kidnapper from silencing a young whistleblower trying to expose corporate corruption.
44	4	"The Proof is Out There"	Samir Rehem	Michelle Ricci	November 23, 2020	272778-59	1.03
While surveilling a client's wife, Angie and Shade encounter a bizarre community of UFO enthusiasts and try to get to the bottom of their strange behavior. Angie comes to an understanding with Tex.
45	5	"All's Fair in Love and Amor"	Shawn Piller	Marcus Robinson	November 30, 2020	272778-60	1.05
Angie and Shade investigate a series of attacks on the stars of a long-running Mexican telenovela. Danica and her girlfriend get engaged.
46	6	"Tappa Kegga Daily"	Shawn Piller	Melody Fox	December 7, 2020	272778-61	0.87
Angie and Shade help Jules and Liam exonerate a college student accused of stealing a vintage comic book.
47	7	"Under Par-essure"	Jason Priestley	Aaron Bala & Sydney Rae Calvert	December 14, 2020	272778-62	1.16
When Shade participates in a celebrity golf tournament, he and Angie must race to unmask a stalker who is menacing a young golfer. Shade makes a connection with an actress who is playing in the tournament.
48	8	"Blueprint for Murder"	Katrina Saville	Melody Fox & Michelle Ricci	January 7, 2021	272778-63	0.96
A high-rise office cleaner witnesses a murder in a building across the way and asks Shade and Angie to find proof. Willow tags along to get first-hand experience about being a PI for an upcoming movie.
49	9	"A Star Is Torn"	James Genn	Story by : Keith Hodder; Teleplay by : Marcus Robinson	January 14, 2021	272778-64	0.94
In the midst of the Toronto International Film Festival, a famous action star hires Shade and Angie to track down a missing heirloom in time for his big premiere.
50	10	"Smoke Gets In Your Eyes"	James Genn	Caitlin D. Fryers	January 21, 2021	272778-65	0.89
Becca calls in Angie and Shade to find a musician who mysteriously disappeared after his jazz club was set on fire.
51	11	"The Perfect Storm"	Winnifred Jong	James Thorpe	January 28, 2021	272778-66	1.03
While stranded on an island during Danica's destination wedding, Angie, Shade, and Zoe deal with a thief who may be hiding among the wedding guests.
52	12	"Drop Dead Carny"	Jason Priestley	Alexandra Zarowny	February 4, 2021	272778-67	0.99
Shade and Angie go undercover to probe the seemingly accidental death of a carnival worker and discover it's a case of murder. The episode ends after Angie is shot during a confrontation with the killer.

=== Season 5 (2021) ===
No. overall	No. in season	Title	Directed by	Written by	Original release date	Prod. code	Canadian viewers (millions)
53	1	"In the Arms of Morpheus"	Jason Priestley	Alexandra Zarowny	July 7, 2021	272778-68	1.00
While recuperating in the hospital, a groggy, heavily medicated Angie overhears a violent argument. Becoming convinced someone at the hospital is in danger, she enlists a skeptical Shade to help her investigate. Jules moves out to a new apartment and Angie moves into Shade's house to aid in her convalescence.
54	2	"School's Out for Murder"	Shawn Piller	James Thorpe	July 15, 2021	272778-69	1.16
Angie, Shade, and Maz unearth long-standing grudges and secrets among her old classmates when they look into a murder at her high school reunion. Angie connects with an old friend and Shade with one of Angie's former school rivals.
55	3	"Dead Air"	Katrina Saville	Veronika Paz & Katrina Saville	July 22, 2021	272778-70	0.97
A radio therapist's wife asks Angie and Shade to discover the reason for her husband's recent erratic behavior and unexplained spending. After clashing with a city councilwoman over her neighborhood redevelopment plans, Don decides to run for her seat.
56	4	"Gone in 60 Minutes"	Shawn Piller	Michelle Ricci	July 29, 2021	272778-71	0.98
The search for Shade's stolen Porsche brings Shade back into contact with an old hockey buddy turned bitter rival and forces Angie to deal with her PTSD. Don's political opponent starts playing hardball as his campaign gains momentum.
57	5	"Murder They Wrote"	Shawn Piller	Sydney Rae Calvert	August 5, 2021	272778-72	1.02
Angie runs into Tex at a mystery writers' convention. When a famous author drops dead during the event, their reunion becomes an investigation as they team with Shade to unravel the real-life mystery.
58	6	"Angie Get Your Gun"	Katrina Saville	Marcus Robinson	August 12, 2021	272778-73	1.18
Nora's boyfriend Rory is charged with stealing a pair of cowboy boots belonging to Billy the Kid. To prove his innocence, Angie and Shade go on a search for the outlaw's hidden treasure.
59	7	"Smart Home Alone"	Jason Priestley	Caitlin D. Fryers & Alexandra Zarowny	August 19, 2021	272778-74	1.12
A financial adviser hires Angie and Shade to find out why her AI-controlled smart home is apparently trying to kill her. Shade and Jada go their separate ways.
60	8	"Queen's Gambit"	Shawn Piller	Marcus Robinson & James Thorpe	August 26, 2021	272778-75	1.36
Shade and Angie look into an odd robbery at a drag club that turns out to be linked to a big heist; Don wins his city council race. While working the case Angie and Shade reexamine their relationship and come to the same conclusion.

== Home media ==
The first season of Private Eyes was released on DVD on May 9, 2017.

== Spin-off ==
On March 18, 2025, it was announced that a spin-off based on the series had entered development at Global with both Priestley and Sampson set to reprise their roles. The new series, titled Private Eyes West Coast, will see Shade and Everett relocating to Victoria, British Columbia, leading very different lives while encountering a world of different cases along with a new group of friends.

In April 2026, The CW picked up the series for release in the United States. The series premiered on the network on October 5, 2026.
