= Wild Cards (TV series) =

Canadian police procedural television series

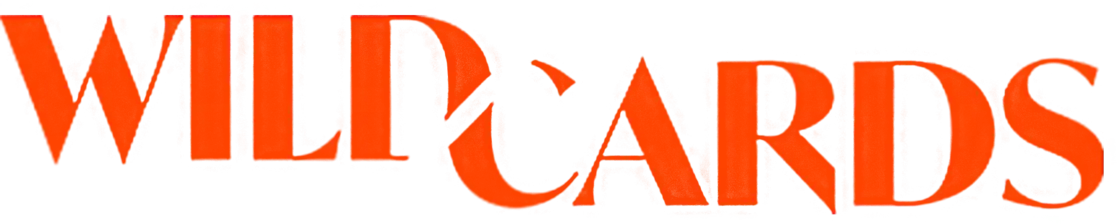
- Genre: Police procedural
- Created by: Michael Konyves
- Starring: Vanessa Morgan; Giacomo Gianniotti
- Country of origin: Canada
- Original language: English
- No. of seasons: 3
- No. of episodes: 33

Production
- Executive producers: Michael Konyves; James Genn; Shawn Piller; Lloyd Segan; Alexandra Zarowny; James Thorpe; Noelle Carbone; Morwyn Brebner
- Producers: Charles Cooper; Virginia Rankin
- Production locations: Vancouver, British Columbia, Canada
- Running time: 43 minutes
- Production companies: Blink49 Studios; Front Street Pictures; Piller-Segan Productions

Original release
- Network: CBC
- Release: January 10, 2024 – present
- Network: The CW
- Release: January 17, 2024 – present

Wild Cards is a Canadian police procedural television series co-produced by the Canadian CBC Television network and American network The CW. It premiered on January 10, 2024, in Canada, followed by its U.S. premiere on January 17, 2024.

In May 2024, the series was renewed for a second season, which premiered on January 8, 2025, in Canada, and on February 5, 2025, in the U.S. In May 2025, the series was renewed through its fourth season.

== Premise ==
Cole Ellis, a detective demoted to water-cop duty, is called to transport Max Mitchell, a seasoned con woman. While awaiting booking at the station, she cracks a major case for him involving the mayor's friends. The pair are offered an opportunity at redemption – Ellis a chance to get back his detective post, and Max a chance to stay out of jail – but they just have to work together.

== Cast and characters ==
=== Main ===
- Vanessa Morgan as Max Mitchell
- Giacomo Gianniotti as Cole Ellis

=== Recurring ===
- Terry Chen as Chief Patrick Li
- Michael Xavier as Detective Simmons (seasons 1–3)
- Amy Goodmurphy as Detective Yates
- Fletcher Donovan as Ricky Wilson
- Jason Priestley as George Graham, Max's father, who Max is trying to get out of prison
- Giacomo Baessato as Officer Jim
- Jonesy as Marc, Cole's Devon Rex companion
- Karin Konoval as Commissioner Russo (season 2; guest season 1)
- Caroline Battista as Officer Toni (season 2; guest season 1)
- Manuela Sosa as Coroner Olive (season 2)
- Martin Sheen as Joseph Edwards (season 2), a con man who has ties to Max and George
- Tamara Taylor as Vivienne Mitchell (season 3), Max's mother, who was presumed dead
- Kaylah Zander as Jessica (season 3), Ellis' girlfriend

=== Guest ===
- Tony D'Angelo as Jaws (season 2)
- Ricky Saints as Atlas (season 3)
- Justin Allgaier as himself (season 3)

== Episodes ==
=== Series overview ===
Season	Episodes	Originally released	
Season	Episodes	First released	Last released
1	10	January 10, 2024	March 13, 2024
2	13	January 8, 2025	April 2, 2025
3	10	January 7, 2026	April 7, 2026
4	10	2027	TBA

=== Season 1 (2024) ===
No. overall	No. in season	Title	Directed by	Written by	Canada air date	U.S. air date
1	1	"The Infinity Thief"	James Genn	Michael Konyves	January 10, 2024	January 17, 2024
To regain his detective status, Cole Ellis, a demoted by-the-book cop, is assigned to work with Max Mitchell, a spirited con artist whose charismatic street smarts could help catch an elusive thief.
2	2	"Show Me the Murder"	James Genn	Morwyn Brebner	January 17, 2024	January 24, 2024
A community outreach lecture on porch pirates turns into a murder investigation when Max and Ellis find an elite sports agent dead in his condo. Max's dad George gives her advice from his jail cell.
3	3	"Howl to Get Away with Murder"	Lee Rose	Story by : James Thorpe; Teleplay by : Sabrina Sherif	January 24, 2024	January 31, 2024
Things go from quaint to creepy when Max and Ellis look into the disappearance of a butcher in a small rural town. Max quizzes Ellis on his personal life.
4	4	"Strangers on a Wave"	Lee Rose	Noelle Carbone	January 31, 2024	February 7, 2024
A surfer with a gunshot wound is found washed up on a beach. The duo must switch roles: Ellis infiltrates the surfing community while Max investigates. Together, they uncover a criminal conspiracy.
5	5	"The Accountant of Monte Cristo"	Shawn Piller	Marcus Robinson & Kristin Slaney	February 7, 2024	February 14, 2024
After an infamous accountant set to testify against the mob is kidnapped, Ellis gets an urgent call from an old friend to help get him back. Chief Li tells Max and Ellis they're on thin ice.
6	6	"Dead of Night"	Shawn Piller	Robina Lord-Stafford	February 14, 2024	February 21, 2024
Max and Ellis go behind-the-scenes of a long-running vampire TV show when a stalker sends cryptic death threats to the cast. Max opens up to Ellis about her mom.
7	7	"Con with the Wind"	Winnifred Jong	Seneca Aaron & Marcus Robinson	February 21, 2024	February 28, 2024
George gets a three-day pass from jail to spend his birthday with Max and feels the urge to pull one more con.
8	8	"Eternal Sunshine of the Therapized Mind"	Winnifred Jong	Alexandra Zarowny	February 28, 2024	March 6, 2024
When a celebrated therapist and best-selling author is murdered, a bickering Max and Ellis go undercover as a married couple at her wellness retreat and discover more than their chakras.
9	9	"Inside (Con)Man"	Alexandria LaRoche	Marsha Greene	March 6, 2024	March 13, 2024
One Saturday morning, while Max and Ellis are both off duty, Max witnesses a bank robbery and ends up among the hostages. Before handing her phone over to the robbers, she manages to initiate a call to Ellis, who is able to hear the situation unfolding inside the bank. He contacts Max's butler, who manages to locate Max using a tracker hidden on her keychain. Breaking protocol—a point firmly underscored by Chief Li, who mandates waiting for the specialized unit to arrive—Ellis enters the bank, establishes contact with Max, and connects her to headquarters. However, the youngest of the robbers—who is also the ringleader—catches him off guard and shoots him point-blank in the chest. Hearing the gunshot, Max rushes desperately toward her partner, only to find him lying motionless on the floor—though, as it turns out, he was saved by his bulletproof vest. Now held at gunpoint but reunited, the two realize that the pregnant woman among the hostages is actually one of the robbers. They set a trap for her, which succeeds; she is arrested, and all the hostages are freed unharmed. Instead of the commendation they expected, however, they receive an extension of their probationary period for having endangered the lives of the hostages by violating protocol.
10	10	"Romancing the Egg"	Amanda Tapping	Marcus Robinson & James Thorpe & Alexandra Zarowny	March 13, 2024	March 20, 2024
Ellis is drawn into a case involving Max, her ex, and a world-famous Imperial egg, where a cat-and-mouse heist tests their friendship, their partnership, and their trust in each other.

=== Season 2 (2025) ===
No. overall	No. in season	Title	Directed by	Written by	Canada air date	U.S. air date
11	1	"Con in 60 Seconds"	James Genn	Michael Konyves & James Thorpe	January 8, 2025	February 5, 2025
New case, a high-speed street racing ring.
12	2	"Once a Con a Time in the West"	James Genn	Marcus Robinson	January 15, 2025	February 12, 2025
Attempted murderer of a ranch family's stud horse.
13	3	"The Lorne Identity"	Shawn Piller	Kristin Slaney	January 22, 2025	February 19, 2025
A paranoid biomedical engineer with a case of amnesia.
14	4	"Dial 'A' for Alibi"	Shawn Piller	Alexandra Zaroney	January 29, 2025	February 26, 2025
Stuck at home with a sprained ankle and a pair of binoculars, aka "Rear Window".
15	5	"Catch Me if You Con"	Shawn Piller	Carina Samuels	February 5, 2025	March 5, 2025
Max's childhood bestie visits.
16	6	"Séance and Sensibility"	Alexandra LaRoche	James Thorpe	February 12, 2025	March 12, 2025
Mysterious murder among an eccentric family where everyone is a suspect.
17	7	"The Big Bang Theory"	Alexandra LaRoche	Gorrman Lee	February 19, 2025	March 19, 2025
Bomb threat, trapped in the police station.
18	8	"Death By Design"	James Genn	Alexandra Zarowny	February 26, 2025	March 26, 2025
When the head of a popular streetwear clothing brand dies, Max and Ellis find themselves investigating a murder within the world of haute couture, fashion models and overworked assistants.
19	9	"Barking Bad"	James Genn	Marcus Robinson	March 5, 2025	April 2, 2025
A murdered dog show judge.
20	10	"Our Lip (Fillers) Are Sealed"	Darcy Waite	Michael Konyves & K. Slaney	March 12, 2025	April 9, 2025
Reality show murder.
21	11	"Bride and Doom"	Shannon Kohli	James Thorpe	March 19, 2025	April 16, 2025
Espionage and counterintelligence when a spy becomes the target of a murder attempt on her wedding day. Some foreshadowing for the next episode and Max's role revealed by the Uncle.
22	12	"Clouds In My Eyes"	James Genn	Michael Konyves	March 26, 2025	April 23, 2025
Ellis gets new information that leads him to a jazz club and possibly the person responsible for Daniel's death; Max poses as a singer at the club to gather intel; George goes before the parole board.
23	13	"Sunrise Sunset"	James Genn	Michael Konyves & James Thorpe	April 2, 2025	May 7, 2025
Ellis makes a shocking discovery about the criminal kingpin responsible for Daniel's death, and who is protecting him; Max, George and Ricky try to solve the cryptic clues hidden in Ashford's office.

=== Season 3 (2026) ===
No. overall	No. in season	Title	Directed by	Written by	Canada air date	U.S. air date
24	1	"Rack 'Em Up"	Andy Mikita	Michael Konyves	January 7, 2026	January 26, 2026
25	2	"Quit Playing Games (With My Life)"	Andy Mikita	Kristin Slaney	January 14, 2026	February 2, 2026
26	3	"M.D.-CEASED"	Amanda Tapping	Marcus Robinson	January 21, 2026	February 16, 2026
27	4	"Dead Weight"	Amanda Tapping	Alexandra Zaroney	January 28, 2026	February 23, 2026
28	5	"Hot Tub Death Machine"	Alexandra LaRoche	James Thorpe	February 25, 2026	March 2, 2026
29	6	"Return of the Corkscrew Killer"	Alexandra LaRoche	Veronika Paz	March 4, 2026	March 9, 2026
30	7	"Yurt So Vain"	James Genn	Kristin Slaney	March 17, 2026	March 23, 2026
31	8	"The Hostage Always Rings Twice"	James Genn	Marcus Robinson	March 24, 2026	March 30, 2026
32	9	"Fast Crimes at Ridgemont High"	Bosede Williams	James Thorpe	March 31, 2026	April 6, 2026
33	10	"Now You Steal Me"	Shawn Piller	Michael Konyves	April 7, 2026	April 13, 2026

== Production ==
=== Development ===
In early June 2023, CBC announced its new dramas for the 2023–24 season would include a new show titled Wild Cards from showrunner Michael Konyves. Shawn Piller would serve as executive producer, with Noelle Carbone as head writer/executive producer, and James Genn as pilot director/executive producer. Later that same month it was confirmed that production and filming had begun. The series is produced by Blink49 Studios, Front Street Pictures and Piller/Segan in association with CBC Television in Canada; in October 2023, it was announced that The CW in the U.S. would also produce the series.

=== Casting ===
In early October 2023, the first casting announcements were made for the two main roles with Giacomo Gianniotti to play the cop and Vanessa Morgan to play the con woman. In December 2023, it was announced that Jason Priestley had joined the cast.

=== Filming ===
Filming took place in Vancouver, British Columbia between July 24, 2023 and October 27, 2023, followed by a single day of filming in Toronto, Ontario. Filming for the third season started in Vancouver on August 28, 2025, as confirmed by the latest post of Giacomo's Instagram account.

== Release ==
Wild Cards was ordered to series by both Canadian broadcaster CBC and U.S. network The CW. The 10 episode first season premiered on January 10, 2024 on CBC Television in Canada and its associated digital streaming platform CBC Gem, as well as on-demand and both platforms' respective websites in Canada, and on January 17, 2024 on The CW, and the following day its app, on-demand and its website in the United States.

== Reception ==
=== Critical reception ===
On the review aggregator website Rotten Tomatoes, the series has an approval rating of 100% from 11 critic reviews, with an average rating of 7.3/10. The first season has an approval rating of 100% based on 6 critic reviews, with an average rating of 6.7/10. The second season has an approval rating of 100% based on 5 critic reviews with an average rating of 8/10.

=== Ratings ===
The first season was CBC's highest-rated new series in terms of audience in 2024. The second season was the third most viewed program on CBC in 2025 with an average of 459,000 viewers.

The first season averaged 892,000 viewers and a 0.1 demo rating on the CW with Live+7 viewership, trailing only Walker and ranking third in demo ratings. The third season premiere was the most-watched episode of the series on the CW with 710,000 same day viewers.

The following are the ratings for the show's broadcast in the U.S. on The CW:

==== Season 1 ====
Viewership and ratings per episode of Wild Cards
No.	Title	Air date	Rating/share (18–49)	Viewers (millions)
1	"The Infinity Thief"	January 17, 2024	0.04/0	0.50
2	"Show Me the Murder"	January 24, 2024	0.08/1	0.56
3	"Howl to Get Away with Murder"	January 31, 2024	0.05/1	0.48
4	"Strangers on a Wave"	February 7, 2024	0.08/1	0.52
5	"The Accountant of Monte Cristo"	February 14, 2024	0.07/1	0.52
6	"Dead of Night"	February 21, 2024	0.06/1	0.45
7	"Con with the Wind"	February 28, 2024	0.04/0	0.47
8	"Eternal Sunshine of the Therapized Mind"	March 6, 2024	0.05/1	0.61
9	"Inside (Con)Man"	March 13, 2024	0.07/1	0.59
10	"Romancing the Egg"	March 20, 2024	0.06/1	0.54

==== Season 2 ====
Viewership and ratings per episode of Wild Cards
No.	Title	Air date	Rating/share (18–49)	Viewers (millions)
1	"Con in 60 Seconds"	February 5, 2025	0.05/1	0.57
2	"Once a Con a Time in the West"	February 12, 2025	0.06/1	0.50
3	"The Lorne Identity"	February 19, 2025	0.03/0	0.43
4	"Dial 'A' for Alibi"	February 26, 2025	0.02/0	0.42
5	"Catch Me if You Con"	March 5, 2025	0.03/0	0.43
6	"Séance and Sensibility"	March 12, 2025	0.04/1	0.52
7	"The Big Bang Theory"	March 19, 2025	0.06/1	0.53
8	"Death By Design"	March 26, 2025	0.04/1	0.48
9	"Barking Bad"	April 2, 2025	0.04/1	0.49
10	"Our Lip (Fillers) Are Sealed"	April 9, 2025	0.04/1	0.49
11	"Bride and Doom"	April 16, 2025	0.03/0	0.48
12	"Clouds In My Eyes"	April 23, 2025	0.03/0	0.48
13	"Sunrise Sunset"	May 7, 2025	0.06/1	0.44
