= List of The Dead Zone episodes =

The following is a list of episodes from the USA Network original series The Dead Zone. The series premiered on June 16, 2002, and ended on September 16, 2007, with a total of 80 episodes over the course of 6 seasons.

== Series overview ==
Season	Episodes	Originally released	
Season	Episodes	First released	Last released
1	13	June 16, 2002	September 15, 2002
2	19	January 5, 2003	August 17, 2003
3	12	June 6, 2004	August 22, 2004
4	12	June 12, 2005	December 4, 2005
5	11	June 18, 2006	August 27, 2006
6	13	June 17, 2007	September 16, 2007

== Episodes ==
=== Season 1 (2002) ===
No. overall	No. in season	Title	Directed by	Written by	Original release date	Prod. code
1	1	"Wheel of Fortune"	Robert Lieberman	S : Shawn Piller; S/T : Michael Piller	June 16, 2002	1001
Johnny "John" Smith wakes up after six years in a coma. He then finds that he can sense the past and future of the objects and people that he touches. His ex-fiancee is married to the local sheriff, and he has a six-year-old son who knows nothing about him.
2	2	"What It Seems"	Rob Lieberman	S : Shawn Piller; S/T : Michael Piller	June 23, 2002	1002
Johnny has a vision of one of his nurses being strangled to death outside her home. He and Bruce, his physical therapist, manage to save her, but the perpetrator rapes and strangles another woman instead. Johnny and Sheriff Bannerman track down the strangler, an old friend of Walt's and a Deputy Sheriff.
3	3	"Quality of Life"	John Lafia	S : Shawn Piller; S/T : Michael Piller	June 30, 2002	1003
Johnny goes back to the school he taught at before his coma, and is hired as a hockey coach. He has a vision about his star player's malformed heart, and takes him out of the game and saves his life. The townspeople are unaware of the medical problem, and believe he cost the team their shot at a championship, costing John his job.
4	4	"Enigma"	Michael Robison	S : Tor Valenza, Michael Piller; S/T : Joe Menosky	July 7, 2002	1004
John helps an old man find a lost love from the WWII era. He relives the man's friend's affair with the woman, before reuniting them.
5	5	"Unreasonable Doubt"	Robert Lieberman	Michael Taylor	July 14, 2002	1007
Johnny is called in for jury duty, and uses his abilities to save the man from an unjust conviction. (A homage to Twelve Angry Men).
6	6	"The House"	James Contner	S : Shawn Piller; S/T : Michael Piller	July 21, 2002	1006
Johnny sees visions in his house about his mother, making it seem Rev. Purdy has murdered her. It turns out the reverend has covered up John's mother's suicide; she killed herself because John was in a coma.
7	7	"Enemy Mind"	Jon Cassar	S : Javier Grillo-Marxuach; S/T : David Benz	July 28, 2002	1009
John is exposed to a large dose of ketamine while trying to save a run-away's life. He must deal with drug laced visions as a drug dealing rival of the girl's boyfriend tries to kill her.
8	8	"Netherworld"	Robert Lieberman	S : David Goldsmith; T : Michael Piller	August 4, 2002	1005
Johnny is trapped in a vision where he is married to Sarah and they have two children. It turns out the vision shows him how his life would have been had he had not suffered the six-year-long coma that activated his abilities, and at the same time, is warning him of an explosion at the local mall.
9	9	"The Siege"	Michael Shapiro	Philip DeGuere, Jr.	August 11, 2002	1008
Sarah enters a bank, and the bank's electrician proceeds to rob the bank. Johnny enters and must find the correct resolution, where each action seemingly leads to a bad ending.
10	10	"Here There Be Monsters"	Michael Robison	T : Craig Silverstein; S/T : David Benullo	August 18, 2002	1010
Johnny has a vision of a ritual sacrifice while visiting Hobb's Landing. He is tried as a witch, and the townspeople attempt to burn him at the stake. He is saved when it turns out one of the daughters is still alive and the killer is their mentally disturbed mother.
11	11	"Dinner with Dana"	Jon Cassar	Michael Taylor	August 25, 2002	1011
Dana and Johnny go on a date/interview. This leads to awkward lovemaking where everyone Johnny knows is in the bedroom with them. Meanwhile Dana's abusive ex lover attempts to kill her, and Johnny and Walt must stop him.
12	12	"Shaman"	Rachel Talalay	Joe Menosky	September 8, 2002	1012
Johnny investigates a meteor and becomes trapped in a cave overnight. There, he communicates with a Native American shaman (Adam Beach) hundreds of years in the past, and helps him save his tribe from the meteor.
13	13	"Destiny"	Robert Lieberman	S : Michael Piller; T : Craig Silverstein	September 15, 2002	1013
Greg Stillson is running for the United States Congress, and Johnny realizes his awakening from the coma has something to do with the politician. Johnny meets him through the Faith Heritage Foundation and experiences an apocalyptic vision when he shakes Stillson's hand.

=== Season 2 (2003) ===
No. overall	No. in season	Title	Directed by	Written by	Original release date	Prod. code
14	1	"Valley of the Shadow"	Michael Robison	Michael Taylor	January 5, 2003	2002
Johnny continues to investigate Stillson's connection with the coming apocalypse. Meanwhile, he and Walt investigate the kidnapping of the child of a tech executive. The kidnapper is testing Johnny's abilities.
15	2	"Descent"	James Head	Robert Hewitt Wolfe, Jill Blotevogel, and Michael Piller	January 12, 2003	2003
A group of teenagers become stuck in an abandoned mine. Walt and Johnny rescue them, but Walt is seriously injured and taken away in an ambulance.
16	3	"Ascent"	James Head	S : Lee Fulkerson & Jon Wesslen; T : Michael Piller; S/T : Jill Blotevogel	January 19, 2003	2005
Walt is in a coma, and when Johnny touches him he is able to join Walt in his mind. He must convince Walt that he wants to live, and keep him away from the light. Walt's love for Sarah is the key.
17	4	"The Outsider"	Michael Robison	S : Steve Binder; S/T : Craig Silverstein	February 2, 2003	2004
Johnny is watching a commercial for a beauty aid when he receives a vision of it causing numerous birth defects in the future. He must help two scientists fall in love in order to prove the product's dangerousness.
18	5	"Precipitate"	Jefery Levy	Teddy Tenenbaum	February 9, 2003	2001
Johnny receives a blood transfusion and starts experiencing the lives of six blood donors, including a homeless man. Johnny must figure out which one is about to be killed and stop it.
19	6	"Scars"	Armand Mastroianni	S : Grant Rosenberg; S/T : Craig Silverstein	February 16, 2003	2007
Johnny shakes the hand of Stillson's congressional opponent and learns he was involved in atrocities in Vietnam. Johnny wrestles with taking down Stillson and doing the right thing. In the end, Stillson's opponent confesses of his own accord.
20	7	"Misbegotten"	Nick Marck	S : Elizabeth Keyishian; T : Andy Dettman and Michael Taylor	February 23, 2003	2006
Johnny is kidnapped by three women making a documentary. They are investigating the murder of a family twenty years prior. One of the women turns out to have a secret connection to the incident, and Johnny must stop her before she can cover it up.
21	8	"Cabin Pressure"	Mike Rohl	Jill Blotevogel and Michael Piller	March 2, 2003	2009
Johnny is on a flight with Rev. Purdy when he has a vision of the plane going down. The pilots think he's crazy, and Johnny must convince them to listen to him to save the plane.
22	9	"The Man Who Never Was"	James Head	David Benz and Michael Piller	March 9, 2003	2008
Johnny helps a former spy, whom the government wants to make disappear.
23	10	"Dead Men Tell Tales"	Gloria Muzio	Bill Dial, Michael Piller, and Daniel Goldin	March 16, 2003	2010
Johnny becomes involved with the mob, when he warns a mob boss of his impending death. He becomes interested in the boss's girl because of her connection to Stillson, and then helps her escape the mob's clutches.
24	11	"Playing God"	Mike Vejar	S : Joel Metzger, Ronald D. Moore, Arnie Wess; T : Craig Silverstein; S/T : David Benz	March 30, 2003	2011
An old high school friend of Johnny's visits. He is dying of heart problems and the only way Johnny can save him is if he lets the man's sister die and become a donor. Johnny must choose whom to save.
25	12	"Zion"	Michael Robison	S : Paul Eckstein; T : Joe Menosky; S/T : Michael Piller	April 6, 2003	2013
Bruce and Johnny go to Bruce's father's funeral. Bruce experiences a vision when Johnny touches him, and experiences what his life would have been like if he'd stayed a preacher in his father's church.
26	13	"The Storm"	Michael Robison	S : Laura J. Burns & Melinda Metz; S/T : Michael Piller	July 6, 2003	2014
Bruce is taking Johnny to an intervention; Johnny's fear of leaving his house and touching people has made him a shut in. On the way, Johnny must save strangers and friends from a tornado that seems to be following him. Johnny confronts the storm, telling it he will again use his abilities to help people, and the storm ends.
27	14	"Plague"	Mike Rohl	S : Jeremy Bernstein; T : Craig Silverstein & Karl Schaefer; S/T : Jill Blotevogel	July 13, 2003	2015
Johnny has a vision of a plague that starts with the children at a science fair. He and Walt must convince a skeptical health inspector and the CDC of his abilities to save everyone. He looks into the future and sees the cure weeks before its discovery. Note: In May 2020, a YouTube video highlighted apparently prescient similarities to the COVID-19 pandemic. Heavy.com noted "It’s no surprise that the episode is so similar to what we’re experiencing now, since SARS and SARS-CoV-2 are in the same family."
28	15	"Déjà Voodoo"	James Head	Karl Schaefer	July 20, 2003	2016
Johnny meets a woman (Reiko Aylesworth) in a bar and has a vision of them kissing. It turns out men are trying to kill her, and Johnny must repeat their meeting several times in order to save her. In one timeline they make love, but in the end he tells her to marry her fiancé.
29	16	"The Hunt"	James Head	S : Joe McMoneagle & Michael Piller; T : Michael Taylor	July 27, 2003	2012
Johnny assists the government in an anti terrorist operation. His visions lead a team of soldiers into a trap, and Johnny helps them escape a deadly firefight.
30	17	"The Mountain"	Mike Rohl	Michael Cassutt	August 3, 2003	2017
Johnny is hiking with Sarah's family in order to bond with J.J. when he experiences a vision of a plane crash. They go looking for it, along with a park ranger and a local couple. These people have brought guns, and kidnap the protagonists. They are looking for treasure that was aboard the plane, and Johnny must find a future where he and Sarah's family survive.
31	18	"The Combination"	James Head	Michael Taylor	August 10, 2003	2018
Johnny has a vision of a boxer dying in the ring. His prediction shakes the boxer's confidence, but he won't stop the fight. Johnny must then lie and tell the boxer he'll win so the boxer will have the confidence to change his future.
32	19	"Visions"	Michael Robison	Craig Silverstein	August 17, 2003	2019
Johnny is met in a shared vision by another post comatose patient who also has visions. The other person being from the post apocalyptical future, wanting Johnny to help save his family.

=== Season 3 (2004) ===
No. overall	No. in season	Title	Directed by	Written by	Original release date	Prod. code
33	1	"Finding Rachel (Part 1)"	James Head	Karl Schaefer	June 6, 2004	4-3001
Johnny has a vision of Rachel Caldwell, a Stillson campaign worker, being killed. He goes to meet her, but finds himself two hours later with no memory of the meeting. Walt must arrest him for the murder.
34	2	"Finding Rachel (Part 2)"	James Head	S : Karl Schaefer; T : Michael R. Perry	June 13, 2004	5-3002
Johnny works to find the real killer. He must convince Rebecca Caldwell (Sarah Wynter), the victim's sister that he is innocent. In the end, one of Rev. Purdy's workers seemingly commits suicide and confesses to the murder.
35	3	"Collision"	Michael Robison	Michael R. Perry	June 20, 2004	6-3003
Johnny has visions of the car accident that put him in a coma, but a present-day girl appears in them. She's stowed away in her father's trunk, and Johnny and Rebecca must find the auto accident before the car burns.
36	4	"The Cold Hard Truth"	Anthony Michael Hall	Michael Taylor	June 27, 2004	1-3004
A shock jock (Richard Lewis) makes disparaging comments on the air about Johnny and Sarah. Johnny confronts him, but must then save him from a vision of falling off a building. J.J. is told that Johnny is his father.
37	5	"Total Awareness"	Kevin Speckmaier	Michael Cassutt	July 4, 2004	3-3005
The government agency (Argon) that Johnny worked for in season 2 is after a girl who seeks Johnny's help. Argon attempts to kill both of them to silence their killing of a senator, but Johnny gets the info to the media.
38	6	"No Questions Asked"	Mike Rohl	Moira Kirland	July 18, 2004	2-3006
Johnny learns about Walt's childhood friends, when one is released from prison. Walt's friend takes Walt's gun, and Johnny and Walt must stop him before he gets hurt or hurts someone.
39	7	"Looking Glass"	James Head	Shintaro Shimosawa & James Morris	July 25, 2004	7-3009
A man touches Johnny at the mall and he has vision of men wearing masks killing a young woman. It turns out to be a staged hoax by twin brothers at the local law school. They debunk Johnny's abilities, but then one of the twins actually kills the girl, exactly as Johnny predicted it.
40	8	"Speak Now"	Mike Rohl	Moira Kirland, Christina Lynch & Loren Segan, and Karl Schaefer	August 1, 2004	10-3010
Johnny accompanies Sarah to a wedding and has a vision of objecting to the marriage. The bride's dead husband is alive, and Johnny, Sarah and Walt must decide what to do in a situation similar to the one involving Johnny's coma and Sarah's marriage to Walt.
41	9	"Cycle of Violence"	Ellie Kanner	Jill Blotevogel and Michael R. Perry	August 8, 2004	9-3007
Johnny has a vision of a school shooting. It turns out to be years in the future, and Johnny prevents the molestation that causes it. The principal's draconian measures to prevent it causes a security guard to kill a troubled, but innocent student.
42	10	"Instinct"	Mike Rohl	Erin Maher & Kay Reindl	August 15, 2004	8-3008
All the animals are acting violently, attacking the townspeople. Johnny finds out the reason for the attacks is that the animals are sensing that a dam is about to break and flood the town.
43	11	"Shadows"	Shawn Piller	Michael Taylor	August 22, 2004	11-3011
Johnny has a vision of himself killing a man. Johnny stops the man from killing Bruce and setting Johnny off, but Johnny begins to doubt himself.
44	12	"Tipping Point"	Michael Robison	Karl Schaefer	August 22, 2004	12-3012
Johnny and Rebecca go to the hospital for tests in order to stop Johnny's headaches and blackouts. Johnny is scheduled for surgery, but he leaves to try to stop Rebecca from exacting revenge on Stillson for his apparent murder of Rebecca's sister Rachel.

=== Season 4 (2005) ===
No. overall	No. in season	Title	Directed by	Written by	Original release date	Prod. code
45	1	"Broken Circle"	Michael Robison and James Head	Michael R. Perry and Michael Taylor	June 12, 2005	13-3013 / 05-3013
Johnny from the future talks to Johnny through the cane head and tries to get Johnny to let Rebecca kill Stillson. Johnny learns that it was Stillson's father who murdered Rebecca's sister, and needs to stop Rebecca before she kills Greg Stillson.
46	2	"The Collector"	Michael Robison	James Morris & Shintaro Shimosawa	June 19, 2005	01-4002
A young homeless woman that Sarah works with is kidnapped and held in a room where the kidnapper tries to realize his fantasy of the perfect woman. A former abductee helps Johnny and Walt find the missing woman, but then helps the kidnapper escape. She wants to be his perfect woman.
47	3	"Double Vision"	Mike Rohl	Karl Schaefer	June 26, 2005	06-4003
Alex Sinclair (Jennifer Finnigan), a female psychic, tests, then helps Johnny. A brain-dead boy leads her to his father, who wants to kill the doctors and insurance agents involved with his son's hospitalization. Johnny stops the man and saves the female psychic when she goes into anaphylactic shock.
48	4	"Still Life"	Mike Rohl	Juan Carlos Coto	July 10, 2005	03-4004
Johnny receives a painting in the mail and gets a vision of the painting's model being killed. The daughter of a renowned artist is jealous of her father's model, and tries to kill her.
49	5	"Heroes & Demons"	James Head	Michael Taylor	July 17, 2005	07-4007
An autistic boy travels across the state to get Johnny's help in proving the innocence of his father, a former cop, who is on death row. With the help of the boy's drawings, Johnny proves that the real criminal is the cop's partner.
50	6	"The Last Goodbye"	Michael Robison	Shintaro Shimosawa & James Morris	July 24, 2005	04-4009
A famous musician thought dead for 20 years is alive. Johnny and Sarah reunite him with his son, and catch the musician's friend. The friend had killed the musician's girlfriend, causing him to fake his own death.
51	7	"Grains of Sand"	James Head	S : Misha Rasovich; T : Christina Lynch & Loren Segan	July 31, 2005	02-4005
Johnny rescues a baby but is unable to save its mother. The baby's parents are illegal immigrants and Johnny must reunite the baby with its father and save a group of Mexican immigrants from unscrupulous coyotes.
52	8	"Vanguard"	James Head	Juan Carlos Coto	August 7, 2005	11-4006
One of Johnny's former students is a scientist. Johnny helps him in the lab and sees that a breakthrough is going to lead to better WMDs. The former student is horrified at this and attempts to destroy his work. He succeeds (mostly), but is killed by the secret organization that backs Stillson and Purdy.
53	9	"Babble On"	Mike Rohl	Adam Targum	August 14, 2005	08-4011
Renovations at Johnny's home cause him to experience his father's confinement to a Psychiatric hospital. As a child, Johnny told his father of a building collapse in the future, and people thought his father was insane when he tried to stop it. In the present, Johnny evacuates the building just in time.
54	10	"Coming Home"	Mike Rohl	Christina Lynch & Loren Segan	August 21, 2005	TBA
Sarah's father moves into a retirement home near her. She and Johnny visit and Johnny gets a vision of dead bodies. One of the home's workers is selling the bodies of residents illegally. Also, Sarah reconnects with her father.
55	11	"Saved"	James Head	Christina Lynch & Loren Segan	August 28, 2005	09-4012
Stillson's girlfriend, Miranda Ellis, goes missing while sailing with Stillson. Stillson asks Johnny to help find her, and they work together. It turns out she's running away from Stillson and Johnny tries to help her flee, but the secret organization threatens Johnny's life, and she agrees to marry Stillson.
56	12	"A Very Dead Zone Christmas"	Karl Schaefer	James Head	December 4, 2005	15-4015
Alex Sinclair comes to visit Johnny for Christmas, and a shared vision leads them to an amnesiac man dressed as Santa being mugged. The muggers are children, and Johnny reunites them with their father as they, Johnny's friends, and the Santa celebrate Christmas. The Santa turns out to be a famous actor.

=== Season 5 (2006) ===
No. overall	No. in season	Title	Directed by	Written by	Original release date	Prod. code
57	1	"Forbidden Fruit"	Shawn Piller	Christina Lynch & Loren Segan	June 18, 2006	23-4023
Johnny tries to convince Miranda that she doesn't have to marry Stillson, but she feels it's her only option. Johnny is finally starting to get through to her, but Janus gives her poisoned earrings, and she dies.
58	2	"Independence Day"	Chris Bruno	Adam Targum	June 25, 2006	14-4014
Johnny and Bruce are stuck in a traffic jam caused when police look for an escaped prisoner. They must help a pregnant woman, and stop Bruce from dying, with the help of a police officer. The officer turns out to be the escaped criminal, impersonating a cop.
59	3	"Panic"	Kevin Speckmaier	Adam Targum	July 2, 2006	22-4022
An injured boy knocks on Johnny's door; he's in the Witness Protection Program and is being chased by two killers. Johnny has visions of a parallel situation involving his grandfather, which helps him, Walt, and J.J. stay alive.
60	4	"Articles of Faith"	Michael Robison	Michael Taylor	July 9, 2006	13-4013
Dana is back, and she helps Johnny solve an apparent hate crime. A white supremacist confesses to the crime, but the man was actually killed by his closeted gay lover. Johnny must save the racist from the gay killer, who wants to kill him before he can recant.
61	5	"The Inside Man"	Michael Robison	Karl Schaefer	July 16, 2006	10-4010
The Faith Heritage Organization is having a showing of religious artifacts. Robbers attempt to steal the finger bone of John the Baptist, while Johnny tries to stop the bad robbers, and helps a good robber; the real owner of the bone. Purdy asks Johnny to touch the bone and restore his faith, but Johnny demurs.
62	6	"Lotto Fever"	Michael Robison	Dan Truly	July 23, 2006	17-4017
A man who Johnny inadvertently helped win the lottery kidnaps Johnny; winning ruined his life. He forces Johnny to help in a robbery, before showing that his gun is empty. Johnny tries to help him by playing poker, losing the money gained in the robbery. Walt then saves them from a hit man previously hired by the lottery winner.
63	7	"Symmetry"	Rachel Talalay	Christina Lynch & Loren Segan	July 30, 2006	18-4018
Johnny experiences a domestic abuse situation repeatedly, from each of the various peoples involved perspectives. It turns out he is in a choke hold, and the lack of oxygen is making his visions go haywire. Johnny stops the situation before anyone is killed.
64	8	"Vortex"	Alexandra La Roche	Michael Taylor	August 6, 2006	21-4021
Johnny has a vision of a little girl being killed by a landmine. A cult leader is leading his followers towards a Waco-style disaster, and Johnny must lead the members through a minefield while Walt deals with an uncooperative FBI.
65	9	"Revelations"	John L. Adams	S : Paul Coyle; S/T : Shintaro Shimosawa & James Morris	August 13, 2006	16-4016
A woman claiming to be Rev. Purdy's daughter shows up, and Johnny has a vision of the Rev. in danger. Purdy's faith healing in the '60s inadvertently caused the death of the woman's mother, and she is seeking revenge, along with a former friend of Purdy's. The former friend tries to "drown" Purdy in a grain silo, but Johnny convinces the woman to help him save the Reverend.
66	10	"Into the Heart of Darkness"	James Head	Shintaro Shimosawa & James Morris	August 20, 2006	19-4019
The woman from the season four episode "The Collector" is back, and she kidnaps Sarah and J.J. She wants to commit suicide by cop, and convinces Walt that she has killed Sarah. Walt almost shoots her, but Johnny stops him, and Sarah and J.J. turn out to be OK.
67	11	"The Hunting Party"	Kevin Speckmaier	Adam Targum	August 27, 2006	20-4020
Johnny has a vision of the Vice President being killed. Janus and Stillson frame a radio talk show host for the murder, during a hunting trip with Stillson and the VP. They make it look like Stillson killed the man in an act of heroism, and Stillson is now the front runner to take over as VP of the US.

=== Season 6 (2007) ===
No. overall	No. in season	Title	Directed by	Written by	Original release date
68	1	"Heritage"	James Head	Ann Hamilton	June 17, 2007
Johnny views visions of his friends in danger at a festival. He believes he has averted the disaster, but a fire later claims Janus and Walt Bannerman — changing Johnny's life and the world's fate, as the visions of Armageddon are gone when he next touches Stillson.
69	2	"Ego"	Rachel Talalay	Matt McGuinness	June 24, 2007
Johnny butts heads with the new sheriff of the Penobscot County Police Department while investigating a psychiatrist with several patients who would like to see her dead.
70	3	"Re-Entry"	Tim Southam	Sam Ernst & Jim Dunn	July 1, 2007
Johnny gets a vision of disaster on a private space mission and is forced to work with Stillson to save the crew.
71	4	"Big Top"	Nick Copus	Richard Hatem	July 8, 2007
Johnny visits an "Alice in Wonderland"-themed circus and becomes part of a ten-year-old murder. J. J. cuts soccer practice to visit a 14-year-old acrobat he's developed a crush on, and Johnny later suspects that his son may have inherited a part of his psychic powers.
72	5	"Interred"	James Head	Katie Wech	July 15, 2007
Johnny has a vision of a man who has been buried alive. Johnny, with the help of Turner, rushes to locate the man.
73	6	"Switch"	Paolo Barzman	Scott Lew	July 22, 2007
Johnny takes a train trip, and the psychic has a vision of someone throwing a woman from the train. Johnny tries to help the woman and becomes romantically involved with her, but soon suspects that she is a fraud.
74	7	"Numb"	Mike Rohl	Dana Greenblatt	July 29, 2007
Johnny slips into a coma after what should have been a simple procedure, prompting Sarah to take an unexpected actions to save him.
75	8	"Outcome"	Érik Canuel	Sam Ernst & Jim Dunn	August 5, 2007
Johnny must turn to a friend of Sarah's for help when he gets a vision in his right eye of an imminent bus station bombing.
76	9	"Transgression"	James Head	Katie Wech	August 12, 2007
Johnny becomes involved in a murder case involving a young woman where everything isn't as it seems.
77	10	"Drift"	Holly Dale	Scott Shepherd	August 19, 2007
A vision in his eye involving a racehorse being stolen troubles Johnny on a trip to visit Bruce. Meanwhile, Stillson gets closer to Sarah and J.J., leading Johnny to realize he may have missed his chance to reunite his family.
78	11	"Exile"	James Head	Richard Hatem	August 26, 2007
Johnny's disturbing vision in his eye of his psychic friend Alex sends him to a small town in an attempt to save her, but he needs rescuing himself after he is accused of murder. Meanwhile, Sarah decides to move out of Johnny's house and confides in Stillson, who has important information on the investigation into Walt.
79	12	"Ambush"	Érik Canuel	Dana Greenblatt	September 9, 2007
Johnny steps up his probe into Walt's case in an effort to salvage his relationship with Sarah, and discovers a link to Turner.
80	13	"Denouement"	Michael Robison	Ann Hamilton	September 16, 2007
Johnny's visions of Walt lead to a shocking discovery about Johnny's dad as secrets from the past are revealed. Elsewhere, J.J. gets his first vision during a scuffle with Stilson and sees Armageddon in the pupil of his eye.
