= Bickford Shmeckler's Cool Ideas =

2006 American comedy film written and directed by Scott Lew

- Movie poster
- Directed by: Scott Lew
- Written by: Scott Lew
- Produced by: Michael Caldwell; Richard Hutton; Andrew Miano; Jody Patton; Jeremiah Samuels; Lloyd Segan; Jonathan Shestack; Chris Weitz; Paul Weitz
- Starring: Patrick Fugit; Olivia Wilde; Fran Kranz; John Cho; Matthew Lillard
- Cinematography: Lowell Peterson
- Edited by: Jonathan Corn
- Music by: John Swihart
- Production companies: Depth of Field; Piller^{2}/The Segan Company; Vulcan Productions
- Distributed by: Screen Media Films; Traction Media; Lightning Entertainment
- Release dates: March 9, 2006 (The Comedy Festival); May 2007
- Running time: 79 minutes
- Country: United States
- Language: English
- Budget: $1 million

Bickford Shmeckler's Cool Ideas is a 2006 American comedy film written and directed by Scott Lew, starring Patrick Fugit and Olivia Wilde. It was Lew's first film. Wilde won Best Actress at The Comedy Festival in 2006.

== Plot ==
The film starts out with the quote "Nothing can ever be truly, fully understood. Not even the most simple idea. Not even this."

Bickford Shmeckler is a lonely college student who keeps a journal known as "The Book" of his philosophical ideas and theories. One night during a loud toga party, his book is stolen by the inebriated and beautiful Sarah Witt, who briefly meets Bickford and is shown to be a kleptomaniac. Sarah becomes enamored with the writings, and experiences what she calls "braingasms". After showing The Book to her boyfriend Trent, she rants about how she would love to meet the author (and have sex with him). Later that night, Bickford discovers that the book is missing and begins to panic.

By interrogating his roommates, Bickford quickly finds and meets Sarah while she is working at the school's art studio. She kisses him, and explains that his work inspired her to paint. They go to Trent's dorm and discover that he threw the book out over his jealously that Sarah was so taken with Bickford's work. By this time, a delusional homeless man nicknamed "Space Man" has found the book, and becomes convinced that Bickford can free the "extra-dimensionals" living in his head. Space Man extorts Bickford, but after making no progress, a despondent Schmeckler gives up. Meanwhile, the owners of a comic book store read the book and fall in love with it, reprinting it, distributing free copies of it, and going as far as selling related merchandise. Sarah discovers this, and still feeling guilty, tells Bickford. They learn of the free distribution of his book, and Bickford confronts the comic store owners. Frustrated that their newfound idol does not care about The Book's newfound popularity, they angrily give it back.

Despite having it once more, however, Bickford still fails to find himself at ease. One of his college professors, who has read the Book, sets Bickford up with a publisher without his consent, and it is heavily implied she demands he sleep with her as a favor. Under increasing pressure, Bickford confides in Sarah that he began writing the book after his mother died in a car accident while he was at the wheel; his father had checked him into a mental institution to treat his resulting mental breakdowns, and he began to record his thoughts in a notebook the doctors provided.

An insult from Sarah prompts Bickford to realize that nothing in life can ever be truly understood, and he includes a disclaimer in The Book warning readers to take the time to have fun in life's fleeting chaos. Bickford returns the book to the comic store owners and grants them permission to reprint and give it away, under the conditions that it be free and no merchandise be created. He then begins a romantic relationship with Sarah, experiences sex for the first time, and is inspired to write a new poem.

== Cast ==
- Patrick Fugit as Bickford Shmeckler
- Olivia Wilde as Sarah Witt
- Fran Kranz as Ralph, Bickford's roommate
- John Cho as Bob
- Reid Scott as Trent
- Matthew Lillard as Space Man
- Cheryl Hines as Professor Adams
- Simon Helberg as Al
- Deon Richmond as Red
- Tyler Francavilla as PJ
- Mageina Tovah as Sam
- Greg Pitts as Doug the Dungeon Master
- J.B. Ghuman Jr. as Bill
- Chris Weitz as Sheldon Schmeckler (voice)
- Clark Gregg as Publisher
- Thomas Lennon as Campus Cop
- Robert Ben Garant as Campus Cop (as Ben Garant)
- Genevieve Cortese as Toga Hussy

== Production ==
Bickford Shmeckler's Cool Ideas was originally a project of Lloyd Segan's Piller^{2}/The Segan Company. The film was completed but unreleased in 2005. Scott Lew wrote the script, finishing it in 1999, and directed the film while in a wheelchair. Lowell Peterson handled cinematography, shooting the film in a digital format with high definition. Jonathan Corn edited the film, and John Swihart composed the music.

The film was produced by brothers Chris and Paul Weitz, Lloyd Segan, and Jeremiah Samuels, and the Vulcan Productions studio. The Weitzs's studio, Depth of Field was also included in production.

== Release ==
Bickford Shmeckler's Cool Ideas first showed at The Comedy Festival on March 9, 2006, and screened on March 13 and 17 at the South by Southwest film festival, in the Emerging Visions section in competition. In June 2006, it played at the Seattle International Film Festival. It later screened at the Hollywood Film Festival in October 2006.

Traction Media was involved in distribution negotiations on behalf of Vulcan.

Screen Media opened a theatrical distribution division to release six films annually, with Bickford Shmeckler's Cool Ideas scheduled for release in May 2007. It was assigned an R rating in April 2007 by the Motion Picture Association. Lightning Entertainment distributed the film outside the U.S.

=== Home Media ===
It was released on DVD August 21, 2007 by Universal Pictures in widescreen format with both Dolby 5.1 and Dolby 2.0 surround sound. The DVD contained a short documentary about Lew, revealing his ALS diagnosis as well as stating that Bickford Shmeckler's Cool Ideas was his first film. The DVD release ran 80 minutes. Marketing involved the Dungeons & Dragons community.

== Reception ==
=== Critical reception ===
Eric D. Snider gave the film a C+. Snider was pleased with Fugit's acting, but felt that the film became too engrossed in Bickford's "fretting," causing it to lose momentum. Marrit Ingman, in a brief review for The Austin Chronicle, also praised Fugit's acting. Ingman found the role of Sarah Witt to be "underwritten" and noted that there is nothing truly insightful in the film, yet enjoyed the film's "heart."

Scott Weinberg of efilmcritic.com rated the film five stars, praising Lew, Fugit, and Wilde. Weinberg also found Matthew Lillard's performance amusing, noting that the character role worked to make him "sympathetic." Weinberg was impressed with the cinematography as well.

=== DVD critical reception ===
VideoHound's Golden Movie Retriever rated the film two stars out of four, stating briefly that it contains more themes than generally expected of a "raunchy college romp." Sean Axmaker, writing for MSN Movies, found the script and direction lacking.

Nick Lyons of DVD Talk did not recommend the film. Lyons found the story to be "aimless" and did not like Bickford Shmeckler as a character. Lyons also felt Matthew Lillard's performance hindered the story, though he did enjoy John Cho's character. He rated the video quality at a four; the audio at a three, stating that the Dolby 5.1 track sounded muffled at times; the extras a three; and both content and replayability a two, all out of five stars.

David Cornelius of efilmcritic.com rated it four stars, commenting that the main character's name was "the only mistake" Lew made in the film. Cornelius found Wilde's performance notable, as he described the role as "flat" but noted that Wilde was able to make the character interesting. Cornelius enjoyed the other performances as well, specifically Fugit. He called Lillard's performance "bright." Cornelius also praised the producers for committing to donating their proceeds as well as a portion of the production studio's revenue to ALS charities.

=== Accolades ===
Olivia Wilde won Best Actress at The Comedy Festival.

== Sources ==
- "Cops Les Forces du Desordre" [Let's Be Cops] (Press release) (in French). 20th Century Studios. January 21, 2015 – via Internet Archive.
- "Crafts 2005 Next Gen: they're the future of Hollywood--artisans poised to envision the media of tomorrow". The Hollywood Reporter. Vol. 87, no. 45. February 14, 2005. Gale A129711943.
- "Global co-production and finance guide". Variety. Vol. 288, no. 46. September 7, 2005. Gale A136708616.
- "MPAA ratings". The Hollywood Reporter. Vol. 399, no. 11. April 19, 2007. p. 16. Gale A163263491.
- "SXSW 06 - South by Southwest Day 4". Dumb Distraction. April 3, 2007 [March 13, 2006]. Archived from the original on October 25, 2007.
- "SXSW Film Fest Schedule". The Austin Chronicle. Vol. 25, no. 29. March 17, 2006. p. 35 – via Internet Archive.
- "U.S. Comedy Arts Festival schedule". Glenwood Springs Post Independent. March 9, 2006.
- Ault, Susanne (January 29, 2007). "Screen Media looks to the big screen". Video Business. Vol. 27, no. 5. p. 28. Gale A158541356.
- Axmaker, Sean (n.d.). "Bickford Schmeckler's Cool Ideas: On DVD". MSN Movies. Archived from the original on August 24, 2007.
- Barnes, Mike (March 6, 2017). "Scott Lew, Inspirational Screenwriter Who Fought ALS to the End, Dies at 48". The Hollywood Reporter. Archived from the original on August 12, 2025.
- Bordas, Sharon; Hayes, Matt; Siegel, L.M., eds. (Summer 2005). Hollywood Creative Directory (54th ed.). Los Angeles: VNU Business Media. ISBN 978-1-92893-639-8 – via Internet Archive.
- Brooks, Brian (January 17, 2007). "Screen Media Launches Theatrical Distribution Division". IndieWire.
- Brooks, Brian (February 6, 2006). "SXSW Film Festival Unveils Line Up; "Prairie" and "Dreamz" Bookend Event". IndieWire. Archived from the original on December 6, 2025.
- Calvario, Liz (March 6, 2017). "Scott Lew Dies: Hollywood Writer And Director Was 48". Deadline Hollywood. Archived from the original on October 17, 2023.
- Cornelius, David (September 12, 2007). "Bickford Shmeckler's Cool Ideas". efilmcritic.com. Archived from the original on February 8, 2010.
- Craddock, Jim, ed. (2009). VideoHound's Golden Movie Retriever. Farmington Hills, MI: Gale Cengage. ISBN 978-1-41442-218-3. ISSN 1095-371X.
- D'Alessandro, Anthony (October 23, 2006). "Out of Africa, off the beaten path: political pics, social justice tales unspool alongside edgy indie fare and sci-fi". Variety. Vol. 93, no. 16. Gale A154755740.
- Dentler, Matt (February 13, 2006). "Close-Up on the Emerging Visions Section". IndieWire.
- Ingman, Maritt (March 17, 2006). "SXSW Film: Bickford Shmeckler's Cool Ideas". The Austin Chronicle. Vol. 25, no. 29.
- Jackson, Todd (March 13, 2006). "Congratulations 2006 Aspen Comedy Festival Winners". Dead Frog.
- Kay, Jeremy (October 31, 2006). "Lightning gets rights to Weitz's college comedy". Screen Daily.
- Lyons, Nick (August 22, 2007). "Bickford Shmeckler's Cool Ideas". DVD Talk.
- McClain, Buzz (July 2, 2007). "Bickford Shmeckler's Cool Ideas". Video Business. Vol. 27, no. 27. p. 6. Gale A165941792.
- Plunkett, Jack W., ed. (2015). Plunkett's Entertainment and Media Industr Almanac 2015. Houston: Plunkett Research, Ltd. ISBN 978-1-62831-351-2 – via Internet Archive.
- Renner, Amy (November 9, 2008). "Bickford Shmeckler's Cool Ideas Movie". Movie Insider.
- Riggs, Thomas, ed. (2007). Contemporary Theatre, Film and Television: A Biographical Guide Featuring Performers, Directors, Writers, Producers, Designers, Managers, Choreographers, Technicians, Composers, Executives, Dancers, and Critics in the United States, Canada, Great Britain, and the World. Vol. 75. Detroit: Thomson Gale. ISBN 978-0-78769-048-9. ISSN 0749-064X. LCCN 84-649371 – via Internet Archive.
- Snider, Eric D. (April 18, 2006). "Bickford Shmeckler's Cool Ideas: The EFC Review". efilmcritic.com. Archived from the original on June 14, 2006.
- Webster, Dan (June 9, 2006). "'Snakes' alive, Lillard's life's a fest". Spokane 7. The Spokesman-Review. Vol. 123, no. 364. p. 21 – via Google Books.
- Weinberg, Scott (March 19, 2006). "Bickford Shmeckler's Cool Ideas". efilmcritic.com. Archived from the original on December 19, 2007.
- Zeitchik, Steven (January 16, 2007). "Screen Media to distribute pics". Variety.
