= Swamp Devil =

- DVD cover
- Directed by: David Winning
- Screenplay by: Gary Dauberman; Ethlie Ann Vare
- Story by: Gary Dauberman
- Produced by: Irene Litinsky; Ric Nish
- Starring: Bruce Dern; Cindy Sampson; Nicolas Wright
- Cinematography: Daniel Vincelette
- Edited by: Simon Webb
- Music by: James Gelfand
- Production company: Muse Entertainment
- Distributed by: Genius Entertainment; RHI Entertainment
- Release date: 17 April 2008
- Running time: 90 minutes
- Country: Canada
- Language: English

Swamp Devil is a 2008 Canadian horror film directed by David Winning and starring Bruce Dern, Cindy Sampson and Nicolas Wright. It is the thirteenth film in the Maneater film series.

== Plot ==
Melanie Blaime returns to her hometown of Gibbington, Vermont because her father, a former sheriff, is wanted for multiple murders. Jimmy Fuller wants to help find her father, and it looks as if something incredibly sinister is responsible for the corpses in Gibbington-that creature known as the Swamp Devil.

== Cast ==
- Bruce Dern as Howard Blaime
- Cindy Sampson as Melanie Blaime
- Nicolas Wright as Jimmy Fuller
- Robert Higden as Jones
- Allison Graham as Deputy Jolene Harris
- James Kidnie as Sheriff Nelson Bois
- Bronwen Mantel as Shelly
- Kwasi Songui as Bigg
- Mary-Pier Gaudet as Lisa Jones
- Jenna Wheeler-Hughes as Young Dream Girl
- Marc Viger Denis as Young Howard Blaime

== Production ==
The film was completely shot in Montréal, Québec and actor Bruce Dern broke his leg on camera running in the woods, one week into the three-week shoot. He finished the film on crutches and using various photo doubles and camera tricks.

== Release ==
It premiered on April 17, 2008 as part of the Houston Film Festival and was released on DVD by Genius Entertainment on April 7, 2009 with no special features.

== Reception ==
Justin Felix, of DVD Talk, said that if you like your horror cheap and dumb - and don't have access to the Sci-Fi Channel - then this is worth a rental. Michael Simpson, of CinemaSpy, said that the film is a cheesy, predictable but entertaining chiller that isn't likely to scare the pants off anyone in their teens or older and that Winning's direction created enough suspense that such cliches were unnecessary. A Fangoria review says that the film pulls no punches about what it is—a throwaway monster flick that borrows heavily from Swamp Thing and the vine-attack sequence from Evil Dead II.
