= Live Once, Die Twice =

- Written by: John Benjamin Martin
- Directed by: Stefan Pleszczynski
- Starring: Kellie Martin; Martin Cummins; Cindy Sampson
- Country of origin: Canada
- Original language: English

Production
- Producers: Jean Bureau; Josée Mauffette
- Running time: 89 minutes

Original release
- Network: The Movie Network
- Release: February 20, 2006

Live Once, Die Twice is a 2006 television drama film directed by Stefan Pleszczynski. It stars Kellie Martin, Cindy Sampson, and Martin Cummins.

== Plot ==
The movie starts with Nicole Lauker saying goodbye to her husband as he and his friend leave to go fishing for three days. As the night comes, the doorbell rings and Nicole answers. It is the police, who inform Nicole that the boat has been destroyed by a bomb and Evan (her husband) is dead. They believe the death was contrived and suspect that Evan was possibly dealing with illegal substances. Nicole is devastated and refuses to believe that her husband has any connection with drugs. That night she gets a call from somebody who had intended to join Evan on the trip but was delayed. He tells her to find "the money", or the men Evan betrayed will kill her too.

As she is searching for the money, she finds an envelope for an address in Detroit. To throw the FBI off her trail Nicole goes to her friend's house and convinces her to dress like her, leave and drive Nicole's car to Washington, D.C. so the suspicious FBI will follow her friend while Nicole goes to find the man at the address. Nicole is shocked to learn that the man at the address died recently in a fire. His wife, a stripper named Zoe, invites Nicole in. They share stories and pictures and soon discover that Evan was married to them both. Zoe has an exact replica of a bird statue that Evan gave Nicole for an anniversary, which is the clue they need to find Evan. Nicole and Zoe seek help from Zoe's bounty hunter friend Mac. Together they go to the art museum where Evan purchased the statues and learn that he is alive, living under another name and address.

They go to his house to confront him; Nicole goes in alone. Evan manages to persuade Nicole that he is actually an undercover agent for the State Department. He justifies his bigamy and two faked deaths as necessary to pull off a $5 million deal with criminals, as ordered by his handler. Suspicious, Nicole demands to participate in the platinum for cash exchange, and Evan reluctantly agrees.

Apparently impressed by her resourcefulness and still professing his love for Nicole, Evan asks her to run away with him to the Caribbean. Nicole tells Zoe and Mac that her future is with Evan and agrees to run off with him. Evan kidnaps Nicole and Zoe and takes them away on his boat. When Evan tries to kill Zoe, Mac shoots Evan. Gunfire is exchanged, and Mac is killed. Nicole saves Zoe and confronts Evan, who taunts Nicole and challenges her to go ahead and shoot him. When Nicole hesitates, Evan laughs at her, calling her weak. But before he can shoot her, Nicole shoots him with a spear gun.

== Cast ==
- Kellie Martin as Nicole Lauker
- Cindy Sampson as Zoe Ravena
- Martin Cummins as Evan Lauker/Luke Ravena/Ken Varleau
- Bruce Gray as Earl Macduff
- Sadie LaBlanc as Lucy (Maid)
- Graham Cuthbertson as Grunt # 1
- Mark Antony Krupa as Ivan
- Caroline Redekopp as Reporter
- Patricia Stasiak as Stripper
- Stéphane Demers as Adrien Gillette
