= Scott Lew =

American film director, producer and screenwriter

- Born: September 24, 1968; Chicago, Illinois, United States
- Died: February 25, 2017 (aged 48); Los Angeles, California, United States
- Education: University of Michigan
- Occupations: Screenwriter, film director, film producer
- Years active: 1999-2017
- Spouse: Ann Lew 2000-2017 (his death)

Scott Lew was an American film director, producer and screenwriter who suffered from ALS.

Lew wrote the script for Sexy Evil Genius, starring Seth Green and Michelle Trachtenberg. He is also the subject of the documentary film Jujitsu-ing Reality, released in 2013.

Lew also directed and wrote the 2006 film Bickford Shmeckler's Cool Ideas.
