= Jason Priestley =

Canadian actor (born 1969)

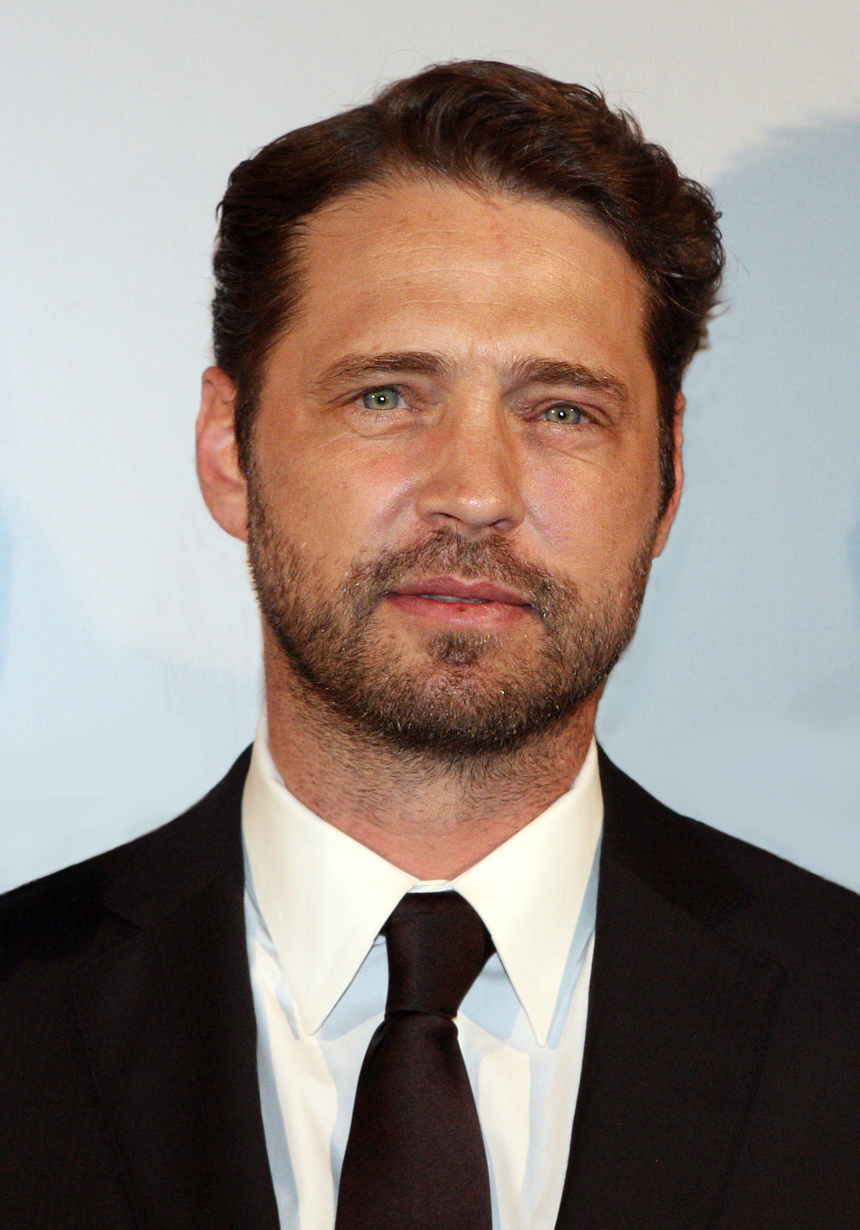
- Priestley in 2012
- Born: Jason Bradford Priestley; August 28, 1969 (age 57); Vancouver, British Columbia, Canada
- Citizenship: Canada; United States
- Occupations: Actor; television director
- Years active: 1978–present
- Spouse(s): Ashlee Petersen (m. 1999; div. 2000) Naomi Lowde (m. 2005)
- Children: 2

Jason Bradford Priestley (born August 28, 1969) is a Canadian and American actor and television director. Priestley starred as virtuous Brandon Walsh on the television series Beverly Hills, 90210 (1990–1998, 2000). His other television roles include Richard "Fitz" Fitzpatrick in the show Call Me Fitz (2010–2013) and Matt Shade in the Canadian series Private Eyes (2016–2021).

== Early life ==
Jason Bradford Priestley was born on August 28, 1969, in Vancouver, British Columbia to father Lorne Dale Priestley and mother Sharon Kirk who was an actress and acting coach.

== Career ==
Priestley first started his television career doing commercials for companies such as Fletcher's Meats and then guest-starring as Bobby Conrad a.k.a. Roberto Coronado Jr., a mobster's grandson, in the early 1987 episode "A Piece of Cake" from the fourth and final season of the television series Airwolf, and appeared in two episodes of 21 Jump Street in 1987–88, as 'Pencil' on Quantum Leap (E1S8 May 1989), then moved on to the 1989 short-lived sitcom Sister Kate, which starred Stephanie Beacham. He played Todd, one of the foster children under the care of Sister Kate, an English nun.

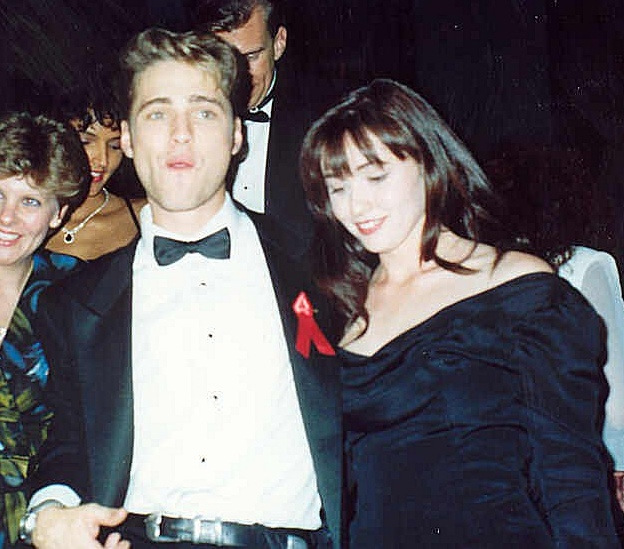
Priestley with Shannen Doherty at the Governor's Ball following the 43rd Annual Emmy Awards, August 1991

In 1990, Priestley was chosen as Brandon Walsh on the hit series Beverly Hills, 90210. The show garnered worldwide fame and popularity and made Priestley a teen idol. He was nominated for two Golden Globes for his work on the show. He also directed 15 of the show's episodes. He remained on the show until 1998, when Brandon moved to Washington, D.C. Brandon was the last Walsh to leave the show; however, Priestley would continue to serve as an executive producer until the show ended in 2000.

Priestley joined the cast of Tru Calling as Jack Harper during 2004 and 2005. He was also a regular on the 2006 program Love Monkey. His television work also includes the WB show What I Like About You and a February 2006 appearance on Without a Trace. Priestley has also made several films, his most notable role perhaps being in 1997's Love and Death on Long Island, in which he played a teen idol struggling to be taken seriously as an actor. He directed the 19th episode in the final season of 7th Heaven. He also directed two episodes of The Secret Life of the American Teenager: "Slice of Life" and "Just Say No." They appeared on August 26, 2008, and September 9, 2008, on ABC Family.

On July 15, 2007, he returned to series television as one of the lead males in Lifetime Television's comedy–drama Side Order of Life. Priestley made a guest appearance on NBC's My Name Is Earl in 2008. He played Blake, Earl's better-looking and more successful cousin. That year, Priestley directed five episodes of Secret Life. Priestley directed the episode when Tori Spelling returned to 90210. In 2009 Priestley directed and co-produced all 12 episodes of the Web series The Lake on TheWB.com. In December 2009 along with Dougray Scott, Brian Cox, and Eddie Izzard, Priestley was featured in The Day of the Triffids, written by Patrick Harbinson, whose credits include ER and Law & Order. The drama is based on John Wyndham's best-selling post-apocalyptic novel, The Day of the Triffids.

Throughout the 2010s, Priestley continued to work as a television director, helming episodes of series including Saving Hope, Working the Engels, The Night Shift, Rookie Blue, Dark Matter, Van Helsing, Ghost Wars, and his own series Private Eyes. Priestley directed his former co-star Luke Perry in the Hallmark Channel movie Goodnight for Justice, which aired in January 2011.

He guest-starred as one half of a con artist couple alongside Jennifer Finnigan in a sixth-season episode of USA's Psych and also appeared in the music video "Boys" by Britney Spears. Priestley starred as the main character of the HBO Canada TV show Call Me Fitz from 2010 to 2013. It ended after its fourth season in December 2013.

In August 2011 Priestley joined the cast of sci-fi television show Haven, in a recurring role during its second season and made two appearances in the final season. He also directed two episodes.

Priestley's feature film directorial debut was the independent road trip comedy Cas & Dylan, starring Richard Dreyfuss and Tatiana Maslany.

In 2013, Priestley directed one episode of the CTV television series Satisfaction.

In April 2013, Priestley appeared in Canadian Stage's production of Race, a David Mamet play, in Toronto at the Bluma Appel Theater. In 2015, Priestley starred alongside Gael García Bernal in Zoom, a comedy directed by Pedro Morelli that premiered at the Toronto International Film Festival.

In May 2016, Priestley began starring in the Global TV Network comedy–drama series Private Eyes, in the role of Matt Shade, a former hockey player turned private detective.

In August 2016, Priestley was inducted into Canada's Walk of Fame.

From 2016 to 2018, Priestley starred opposite Molly Ringwald in Raising Expectations. In addition to starring in the series, Priestley directed several episodes.

Jason Priestley was nominated for best lead actor in a comedy series for The Movie Network's Nova Scotia-filmed Call Me Fitz.

In 2019, Priestley reunited with his original Beverly Hills, 90210 castmates Shannen Doherty, Jennie Garth, Ian Ziering, Gabrielle Carteris, Brian Austin Green, and Tori Spelling for BH90210, which was a six-episode series in which the cast played heightened, fictionalized versions of themselves. The series aired in August and September 2019 and was canceled after one season.

Starting in 2024, Priestley played George Graham, the incarcerated con-artist father of lead character Max Mitchell, in the CBC/CW crime-comedy series Wild Cards, continuing in the role through the show's third season.

In 2025, it was announced that Priestley would reprise his role as Matt Shade, in Private Eyes: West Coast, a spinoff of Private Eyes set in Victoria, British Columbia, four years after the original series concluded.

== Personal life ==
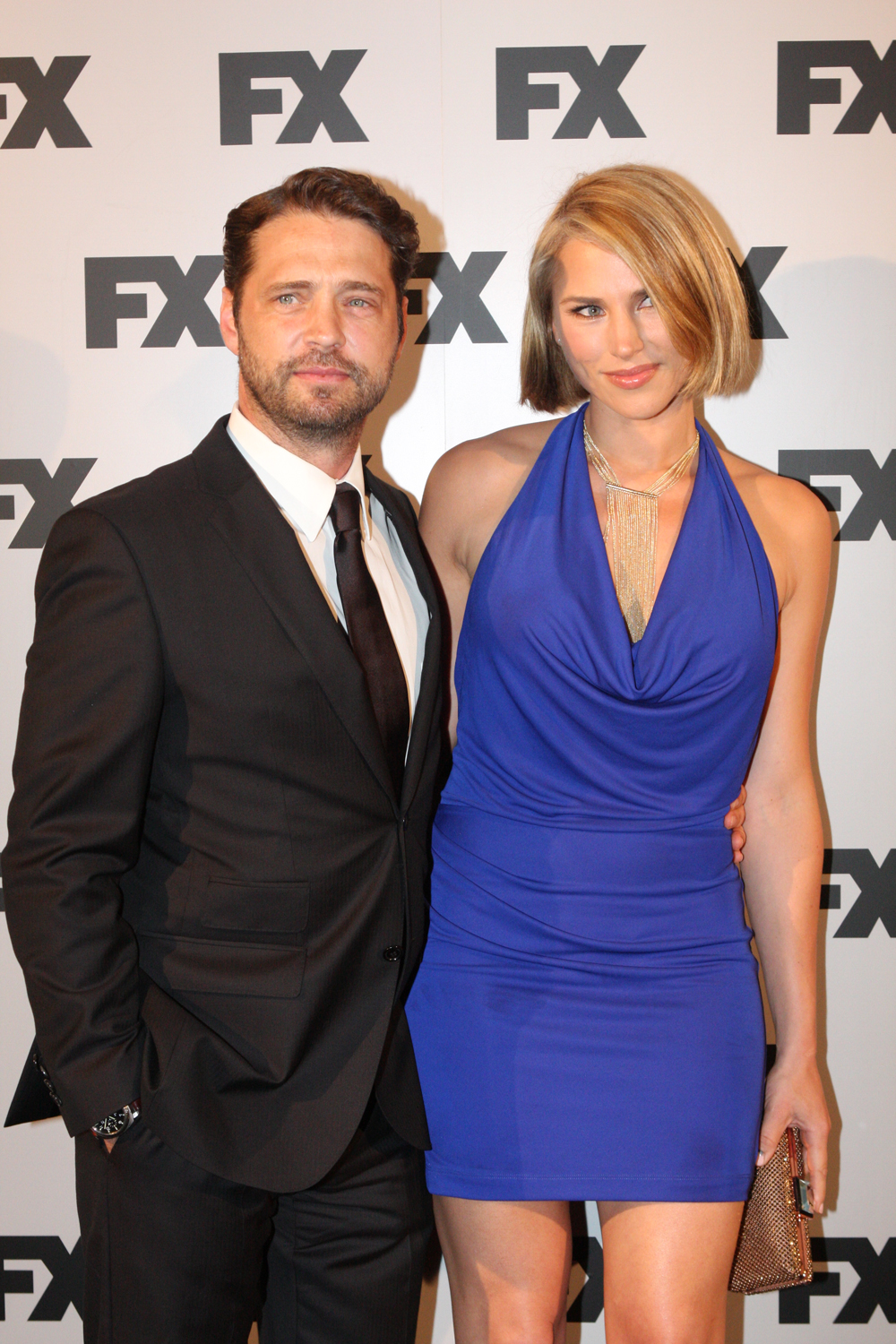
Jason Priestley with his wife Naomi Lowde-Priestley (2012)

In 1999, Priestley crashed his Porsche car into a telephone pole in Hollywood Hills and was arrested for driving while under the influence. His driver's license was suspended for a year, and he was ordered to complete an alcohol-management program.

Priestley and make-up artist Ashlee Petersen married on February 2, 1999, and divorced 11 months later on January 2, 2000. On May 14, 2005, Priestley married Naomi Lowde, also a make-up artist. On July 2, 2007, the couple had a daughter. On April 13, 2009, Priestley announced that he and his wife were expecting their second child. On July 9, 2009, the couple had a son.

Priestly became a naturalized American citizen in 2007 after 20 years of living in the United States.

In 2013, the restaurant chain Tim Hortons created a new doughnut in Priestley's honor, called The Priestley. The new doughnut was not rolled out on a nationwide scale, though.

On May 6, 2014, HarperOne published Priestley's autobiography Jason Priestley: A Memoir.

In December 2017, amid renewed public scrutiny of Harvey Weinstein following sexual misconduct allegations against him, Priestley said on Twitter that he had punched Weinstein in the face during a Miramax party after the 1995 Golden Globe Awards, after Weinstein told him to leave and then grabbed his arm. Priestley later said he had not recognized Weinstein at the time of the altercation and only learned his identity the next day.

In 2024, Priestley relocated with his wife and two children from Los Angeles to Nashville, Tennessee, saying the decision was driven by finding a school in Nashville that worked for both of his children.

In July 2024, following the death of his former Beverly Hills, 90210 co-star Shannen Doherty, Priestley paid tribute to her on social media, describing her as "a force of nature." He later said in an August 2024 interview that her death still came as a surprise to him despite knowing of her long cancer battle.

== Motorsports ==
Priestley's hobbies include race-car driving. He rallied a Toyota Celica All-Trac ST185 in the SCCA Pro Rally Series during the early to mid-1990s. He has provided commentary and interviews of racers for ABC's TV coverage of IndyCar racing. Priestley transitioned toward circuit racing in 1996. Over the following two seasons, he drove Ford Mustangs in IMSA GTS, USRRC GT1, and Motorola Cup competition with Multimatic Motorsports. In 1999, he participated in the first Gumball 3000 rally, driving a Lotus Esprit V-8. On August 11, 2002, he was seriously injured during a practice run at the Kentucky Speedway when his Indy Pro Series car crashed into a wall at nearly 180 miles per hour.

According to a January 2008 Associated Press article, it was announced that Priestley would become a joint owner in a new IndyCar Series team. The new team was known as Rubicon Race Team managed by co-owner Jim Freudenberg. They initially entered a car in the 2008 Indianapolis 500. The car was prepared by Indianapolis-based Sam Schmidt Motorsports and the driver was Max Papis.

In the article, Priestley said, "I'm excited to be able to spend the month of May in Indy with my good friends and be a part of the greatest open wheel race. . . . It's been more than five years since my accident, and it's going to be so good to get to see everyone." Despite the team's enthusiasm, it suffered a crash during the second weekend of qualifying, then had subsequent gearbox problems and failed to qualify for the race.

Priestley was among the owners of the FAZZT Race Team, which competed in the IndyCar Series in 2010 with Canadian racer Alex Tagliani. The car, numbered 77 and sponsored by Bowers & Wilkins, was bought out in 2011 by Sam Schmidt Motorsports. With Tagliani retained by the team, he won the pole at the 2011 Indianapolis 500. In October 2011, two-time and defending Indy 500 winner Dan Wheldon took over at Kentucky. At the season-ending IZOD IndyCar World Championship at Las Vegas Motor Speedway, Wheldon was killed in a fifteen-car crash.

=== American Open-Wheel racing results ===
(key)

==== Indy Pro Series ====
Year	Team	1	2	3	4	5	6	7	Rank	Points	Ref
2002	Kelley Racing	KAN; 2	NSH; 6	MIS; 13	KTY; DNS	STL	CHI	TXS	14th	99	

== Promotional activity for Barenaked Ladies ==
Priestley is a big fan of the band Barenaked Ladies and went to many of their California concerts in the early to mid-1990s. He eventually met the band and in his desire to help them succeed, suggested that he direct the music video for "The Old Apartment," and use his fame to persuade American stations to air it. He did just that, and also invited the band to play at the "Peach Pit After Dark" on an episode of 90210. Lead singer Ed Robertson continues to cite him as being instrumental in their American success. His final notable contribution to the band came when he directed a feature-length documentary about the band's 1999 whirlwind of success titled Barenaked in America, intending to capture on film the fun he had while riding around on the tour bus with the band.

== Filmography ==
=== Film ===
Year	Title	Role	Notes
1986	The Boy Who Could Fly	Gary	
1988	Watchers	Boy on Bike	
1989	Nowhere to Run	Howard	
1992	Learn Gun Safety With Eddie Eagle VHS	Host	
1993	Calendar Girl	Roy Darpinian	
1993	Tombstone	Deputy Billy Breakenridge	
1995	Coldblooded	Cosmo Reif	
1997	Love and Death on Long Island	Ronnie Bostock	
1997	Hacks	The Dude	
1997	Vanishing Point	The Voice	
1998	Conversations in Limbo		
1998	The Thin Pink Line	Hunter Green	
1999	Choose Life	DJ	
1999	Dill Scallion	Jo Joe Hicks	
1999	Standing on Fishes	Jason	
1999	Eye of the Beholder	Gary	
2000	Lion of Oz	Lion	Voice
2000	Herschel Hopper: New York Rabbit	Xavier	Voice
2000	The Highwayman	Breakfast	
2001	Double Down	David	
2001	The Fourth Angel	Davidson	
2002	Darkness Falling	Michael Pacer	
2002	Cherish	Andrew	
2002	Cover Story	JC Peck	
2002	Time of the Wolf	Mr. Nelson	
2002	Fancy Dancing	Asa Gemmil	
2003	Die, Mommie, Die!	Tony Parker	
2004	Reality of Love	film	
2004	Going the Distance	Lenny Swackhammer	
2006	Hot Tamale	Jude	
2006	Made in Brooklyn	D.J.	
2010	The Last Rites of Ransom Pride	John	
2013	Enter the Dangerous Mind	Dr. Dubrow	
2015	Zoom	Dale	
2015	Being Canadian	Himself	Documentary
2016	Away from Everywhere	Alex Collins	

=== Television ===
Year	Title	Role	Notes
1978	Stacey	Duncan	Television film
1987	Airwolf	Bobby	Episode: "A Piece of Cake"
1987	21 Jump Street	Tober / Brian Krompasick	2 episodes
1987	Danger Bay	Derek	Episode: "Deep Trouble"
1988	MacGyver	Danny	Episode: "Blood Brothers"
1989	Teen Angel	Buzz Gunderson	Lead role, 10 episodes
1989	Quantum Leap	Pencil	Episode: "Camikazi Kid"
1989–1990	Sister Kate	Todd Mahaffey	Main role, 19 episodes
1990	Teen Angel Returns	Buzz Gunderson	Lead role, 4 episodes
1990–2000	Beverly Hills, 90210	Brandon Walsh	Main role (seasons 1–9); Guest role (season 10); 246 episodes
1992	Saturday Night Live	Host	Episode: "Jason Priestley/Teenage Fanclub"
1992	Drexell's Class	Teen Priest	Episode: "Cruisin'"
1992	Eek! The Cat	Bo Diddly Squat	Voice role; 6 episodes
1994	Kings Island 20th Anniversary Special	Host	Television special
1995	Choices of the Heart: The Margaret Sanger Story	Narrator	Television film
1995	Biker Mice from Mars	Jack McCyber	Voice, 2 episodes
1997	Vanishing Point	The Voice	Television film
1997	The Outer Limits	Anthony Szigetti	Episode: "New Lease"
1998	Superman: The Animated Series	Reep Daggle/Chameleon Boy	Voice, episode: "New Kids in Town"
2000	Common Ground	Billy	Television film
2000	Homicide: The Movie	Det. Robert Hall	Television film
2000	The 11 O'Clock Show	Himself	4 episodes
2000	Kiss Tomorrow Goodbye	Jarred	Television film
2001	Spin City	Scott	Episode: "In the Company of Dudes"
2002	Jeremiah	Michael	Episode: "...And the Ground, Sown with Salt"
2002	Tom Stone	Doug	Episode: "Little Bitty"
2002	Warning: Parental Advisory	Charlie Burner	Television film
2002	The True Meaning of Christmas Specials	Santa Dude	Television special
2003	8 Simple Rules	Carter Tibbits	Episode: "Every Picture Tells a Story"
2004	Chicks with Sticks	Steve Cooper	Television film
2004	Rides	Host	Documentary
2004	I Want to Marry Ryan Banks	Ryan Banks	Television film
2004	Sleep Murder	Peter Radwell	Television film
2004	Quintuplets	Steve Chase	Episode: "Thanksgiving Day Charade"
2004–2005	Tru Calling	Jack Harper	Recurring role (season 1); Main role (season 2); 13 episodes
2005	Colditz	Flying Officer Rhett Barker	Television film
2005	Murder at the Presidio	Tom	Television film
2005	What I Like About You	Charlie	2 episodes
2005	Snow Wonder	Warren	Television film
2006	Hockeyville	Himself	
2006	Love Monkey	Mike Freed	Main role, 8 episodes
2006	Without a Trace	Allen Davis	Crossroads
2006	Above and Beyond	Sir Frederick Banting	Miniseries
2006	Shades of Black: The Conrad Black Story	Jeff Riley	Television film
2006	Masters of Horror	Alan Alstein	Episode: "The Screwfly Solution"
2007	Subs	Mr. Clayton	Unsold TV pilot
2007	Luna: Spirit of the Whale	Ted Jeffries	Television film
2007	Medium	Walter Paxton	3 episodes
2007	Don't Cry Now	Nick	Television film
2007	Termination Point	Caleb Smith	Television film
2007	Everest '82	John Lauchlan	Miniseries
2007	Side Order of Life	Ian Denison	Main role, 13 episodes
2008	The Other Woman	Pete	Television film
2008	My Name Is Earl	Cousin Blake	Episode: "Earl and Joy's Anniversary"
2008	A Very Merry Daughter of the Bride	William	Television film
2009	Expecting a Miracle	Pete Stanhope	Television film
2009	The Day of the Triffids	Coker	Miniseries
2010–2013	Call Me Fitz	Richard "Fitz" Fitzpatrick	Lead role, 48 episodes
2011–2015	Haven	Chris Brody	Recurring role, 6 episodes
2011	Stephen King's Bag of Bones	Marty	Miniseries
2012	Psych	Clive	Episode: "Neal Simon's Lover's Retreat"
2013	How I Met Your Mother	Himself	Episode: "P.S. I Love You"
2013	CSI: Crime Scene Investigation	Jack Witten	Episode: "Frame by Frame"
2014	Hot in Cleveland	Corey Chambers	Episode: "Rusty Banks Rides Again"
2015	Mummies Alive	Himself	Narrator, TV documentary series
2015	Welcome to Sweden	Himself	Episode: ""Ljuden"/"Searching for Bergman"
2016–2018	Raising Expectations	Wayne Wayney	Series lead
2016–2021	Private Eyes	Matt Shade	Series lead; also executive producer
2018	The Joel McHale Show with Joel McHale	Himself	Episode: "Pickler, Pebbles, Pillows, and Priestley"
2019	The Twilight Zone	Himself	Episode: "Blurryman"
2019	BH90210	Himself/Brandon Walsh	Main role; also producer and director
2019	Dark Angel	Tony Tatterton	Television film
2019	Fallen Hearts	Tony Tatterton	Television film; also director
2019	Gates of Paradise	Tony Tatterton	Television film; also executive producer
2019	Web of Dreams		Television film; executive producer
2020	The Order	Himself	Episode: "Spring Outbreak"
2020	Dear Christmas	Chris Massey	Television film
2020	Corner Gas Animated	Mr. Cahill	Voice, episode: "Float Your Vote"
2022	Canada's Got Talent	Himself	Guest Judge, 2 episodes
2022-2023	Summer Memories	Keith	
2023	Fantasy Island	Gavin Beck	Episode: "MJ Akuda & the 1st, 2nd, and 3rd Wives Club"
2023	Mort sur la piste	Detective LAPD Ryan Martin	French Television film
2023	Börje – The Journey of a Legend	Gerry McNamara	Miniseries
2022-2024	All There Is	Greyson	
2024–present	Wild Cards	George Graham	Main role
2026–present	Private Eyes: West Coast	Matt Shade	Series lead; also executive producer

=== Music videos ===
Year	Song	Performer	Notes
1992	"I Drove All Night"	Roy Orbison	with Jennifer Connelly
1996	"The Old Apartment"	Barenaked Ladies	
2002	"Boys (The Co-Ed Remix)"	Britney Spears	Cameo

=== As a director ===
Year	Title	Medium	Notes
1993–97	Beverly Hills, 90210	TV episodes	15 out of 245 episodes
1997	The Outer Limits	TV episode	Episode: "New Lease"
1999	Barenaked in America	Documentary film	
2000	Kiss Tomorrow Goodbye	TV film	
2001	Grosse Pointe	TV episode	Episode: "Opposite of Sex"
2006	Hollywood & Vines	TV episode	
2007	7th Heaven	TV episode	Episode: "Some Break-Up and Some Get-Togethers"
2007	Don't Cry Now	TV film	
2007	Subs	TV film	
2008	The Other Woman	TV film	
2008–09	The Secret Life of the American Teenager	TV series	5 episodes
2009	90210	TV series	Episode #18: "Off the Rails"
2009	The Lake	TV series	Series director
2010	Athletes in Motion	TV film	
2010	Athletes in Motion: Just Beat It	Short	
2010–2013	Call Me Fitz	TV series	8 episodes
2011–2012	Haven	TV episodes	2 episodes
2011	Dear Santa	TV film	
2011–2013	Goodnight for Justice	TV miniseries	
2013–2017	Saving Hope	TV series	4 episodes
2013	Cas and Dylan	Feature film	
2013	Satisfaction	TV episodes	2 episodes
2014	Working the Engels	TV series	4 episodes
2015	The Night Shift	TV episode	Episode: "Fog of War"
2015	Rookie Blue	TV episode	Episode: "Breaking Up the Band"
2016	Dark Matter	TV episode	Episode: "She's One of Them Now"
2016	Van Helsing	TV episode	2 episodes
2017	Private Eyes	TV episode	Episode: "The Extra Mile"
2017	Ghost Wars	TV episode	2 episodes
2017	Raising Expectations	TV episode	Episode: "Smells Like Victory"
2018	Van Helsing	TV episode	2 episodes
2019	Private Eyes	TV episode	Episode: "Hog Day Afternoon"
2019	BH90210	TV episode	Episode: "The Photo Shoot"
2019	V. C. Andrews Television movie adaptations	TV film	"Fallen Hearts"
2020–2021	Private Eyes	TV episodes	
2023	My Life with the Walter Boys	TV episodes	2 episodes
2024	Wild Cards	TV episodes	TBA
2026	North of North	TV episodes	Episode "Code Blue"

=== Awards and nominations ===
Gemini Awards

- 2003: Nominated, "Best Performance or Host in a Variety Program or Series" – The True Meaning of Christmas Specials (shared w/co-stars)

Golden Globe Awards

- 1993: Nominated, "Best Performance by an Actor in a TV-Series (Drama)" – Beverly Hills, 90210
- 1995: Nominated, "Best Performance by an Actor in a TV-Series (Drama)" – Beverly Hills, 90210

Young Artist Awards

- 1990: Nominated, "Best Young Actor Supporting Role in a Television Series" – Sister Kate

== See also ==
- List of celebrities who own wineries and vineyards
