= Video Business =

American magazine and website

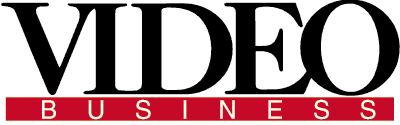
- Editor: Carl DiOrio
- Frequency: Weekly
- First issue: 1981
- Company: Reed Business Information, Inc
- Language: English
- Website: www.videobusiness.com

Video Business was a trade magazine and website that covered the home video business. It was a sister publication to Daily Variety.

== History ==
Video Business was founded in 1981 as a monthly magazine and became a newsweekly in 1988. Video Business has acquired its competitor Video Trade Weekly in August 1992. They were merged into one publications titled Video Home Entertainment.

Video Business partnered with Christian Entertainment Review in January 2006 to publish a special co-branded Easter magazine. Video Business launched a new Mini Site in July 2006 titled VB Live. The site was created for continuous coverage during major home entertainment industry events. Video Business ranked 27th in the BtoB Magazine Annual Top 100 Trade Publications Special Report by 2005 revenue.

In February 2008, Video Business parent company Reed Business Information was put on sale. The January 2010 4th edition of Video Business was its last published issue.
