= Sexy Evil Genius =

2013 film by Shawn Piller

- DVD cover
- Directed by: Shawn Piller
- Written by: Scott Lew
- Produced by: Mark Amin; Lloyd Segan; David W. Higgins
- Starring: Seth Green; Katee Sackhoff; William Baldwin; Michelle Trachtenberg; Harold Perrineau
- Cinematography: Jules Labarthe
- Edited by: David W. Hagar
- Music by: Patric Caird
- Production companies: Launchpad Productions; Piller/Segan/Shepherd; Sobini Films
- Distributed by: Lionsgate Films
- Release date: April 9, 2013 (United States)
- Running time: 90 minutes
- Country: United States
- Language: English

Sexy Evil Genius is a 2013 American black comedy film written by Scott Lew and directed by Shawn Piller. The plot concerns several people in a bar who realize that they have all dated the same woman and that she has manipulated them into appearing there for mysterious purposes.

== Plot ==
Salesman Zach Newman sits alone in a bar when he meets Miranda Prague. After talking to her for a few minutes, they realize that they are ex-lovers of the same woman, Nikki Franklyn. They were both told to arrive at different times and wait for Nikki, who would be joining them later. Miranda reveals that Nikki just got out of a mental hospital after killing a man she was dating by poisoning him. Shortly thereafter they are joined by Marvin Coolidge, a jazz musician and also a former lover of Nikki. The trio trade stories about Nikki for a bit until Nikki herself arrives, bringing the table a round of drinks and passing them out herself. With Nikki is her defense attorney turned fiancé Bert Mayfair. Nikki tells them all that the evening is about a big announcement, and she declares that she is getting married. Bert becomes angry with Nikki, as he did not want his engagement to her publicized yet, for fear of losing his law license.

Upset, Nikki rushes to the bathroom, and Miranda follows her. While the girls are gone, Bert admits that he bribed doctors to testify to Nikki's insanity so that she would escape the murder charges. He also admits that Nikki really is insane and that he fears she will kill someone that night. After the girls are gone too long, Zach checks on them. Nikki rushes out, but Miranda pulls him into the restroom and shows him a gun that Nikki gave her. Back at the table with the others, Nikki accuses Marvin of planting heroin where she could find it, knowing that Nikki had once been an addict. Marvin vehemently denies this and suggests that Nikki made it up as an excuse to hate him for their breakup. A disheveled Zach and Miranda return to the table and admit that they were making out. They also claim that Nikki's wedding announcement is not the real reason they are there and that Nikki is looking for revenge on them all.

After more arguing, Nikki admits that she brought them there to settle her old scores with them. Zach becomes worried that she has poisoned them all, and Nikki turns serious. She admits that she coldly murdered her ex-boyfriend by brewing her own arsenic and watching him gasp and spasm as he died. She tells Bert that she's not insane but instead planned it all, knowing she could fake insanity. As the others become more paranoid, Bert decides he's had enough and gets up to leave. Bert pauses when Marvin suddenly develops a sharp headache, and Nikki claims to have poisoned Marvin. Before he slips into unconsciousness, Marvin admits he really did plant the heroin for Nikki to find. The others are horrified and frantically ask if they've been poisoned. Nikki tells Bert that she overheard him tell her doctor that he wanted her sent back to the asylum because he wanted to be rid of her.

Fearing he's been poisoned as well, Bert flies into a rage, grabs Nikki by the throat, and begins to choke her. Unable to break his hold, Miranda retrieves the gun Nikki gave her and shoots Bert in both knees. Nikki admits that she didn't kill Marvin and only gave him drugs to induce him into a K-hole. She reassures them that she did not poison anyone else. She takes the gun back from Miranda and leaves, telling them that she plans to disappear. The next morning, the police release Miranda without her being charged. Zach, who waits for her in the lobby of the police station, offers to drive her home, which she accepts. She mentions that Bert assaulted several cops while being arrested and that his career is over. They drive off together and do not notice Nikki watching from a nearby rooftop. Nikki gets in her car and drives away.

== Cast ==
- Katee Sackhoff as Nikki Franklyn
- Michelle Trachtenberg as Miranda Prague
- Anthony Michael Hall as Mark Von Dutch
- Seth Green as Zachary Newman
- Harold Perrineau as Marvin Coolidge
- William Baldwin as Bert Mayfaire
- Adam Daniel as Officer Cramer

== Production ==
Writer Scott Lew suffers from ALS. According to The Hollywood Reporter, he wrote early drafts of the script through dictation; after his condition worsened, he was limited to pointing at letters and words. Lew wanted to focus on the theme of an unhappy adult whose ex-girlfriend forces him to reflect on their teenage years, a more creative time in his life. Katee Sackhoff, who served as co-producer, had a hand in the casting. Shooting took twelve days, and the scenes were shot in order. It was shot in Los Angeles in June 2011. The script and the opportunity to work with Sackhoff drew Seth Green to the project.

== Release ==
Sexy Evil Genius was released direct-to-video on April 9, 2013.

== Reception ==
Nathan Rabin of The A.V. Club wrote, "As the title suggests, Sexy Evil Genius tries way too hard. It treats itself to a victory lap before the game has even begun and never stops patting itself on the back for its wildly inflated sense of outrageousness." Rabin concludes that it is "pretty dire". Gordan Sullivan of DVD Verdict called it "the perfect kind of film for late-night cable". Thomas Spurlin of DVD Talk rated it 2.5/5 stars and wrote that the over-the-top, melodramatic elements of the film detract from the sardonic dialogue.
