= James Genn =

Canadian film and TV writer and director

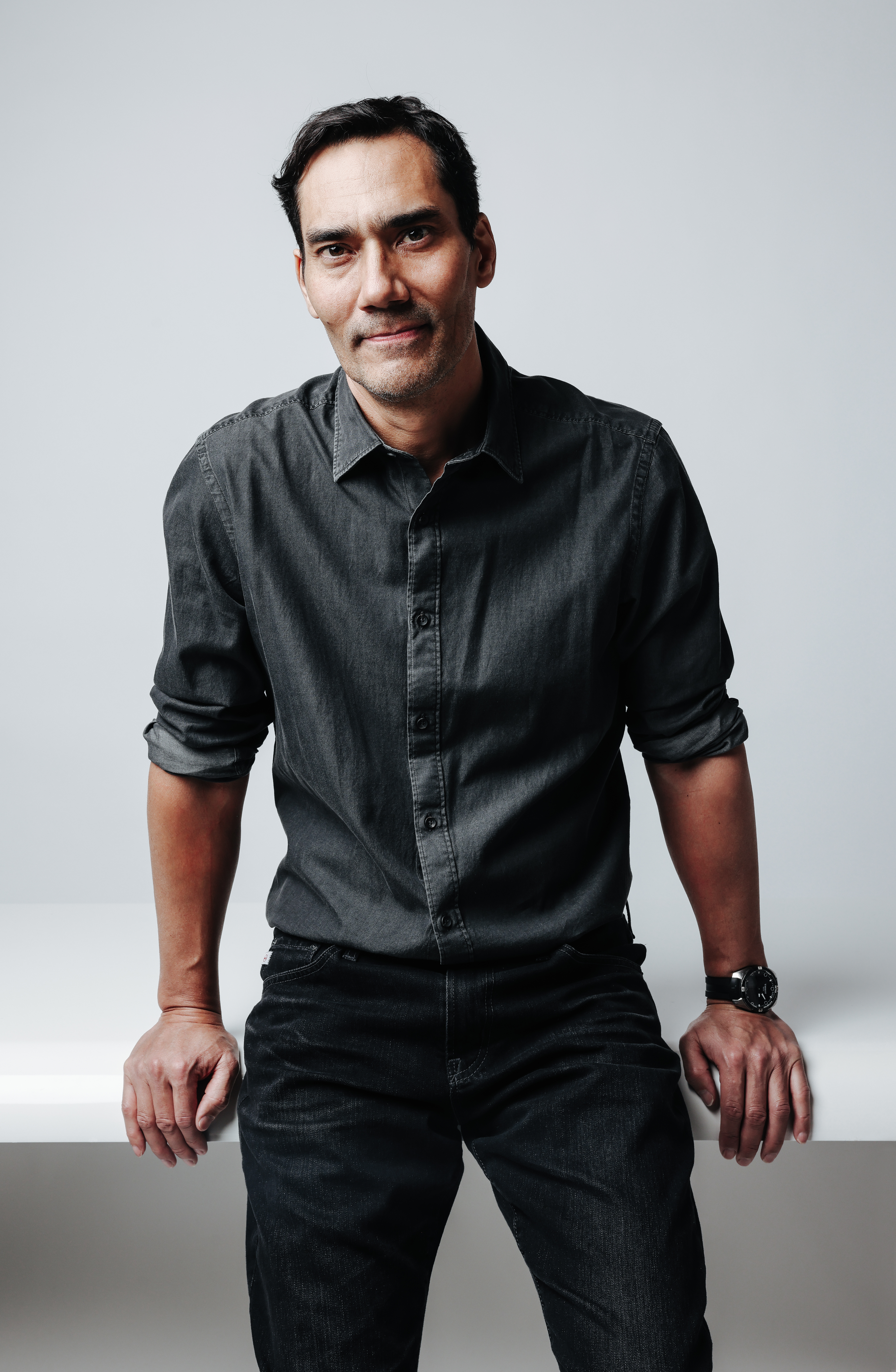
Canadian Director/Writer/Producer James Genn

James Douglas Genn is a Canadian film/TV writer, producer, and director born in Vancouver, British Columbia in 1972.

== Biography ==
Prior to working exclusively as a director and writer, Genn had a successful career in Canada as a sound designer.

Genn serves as executive producer on the crime comedy series Wild Cards. He also directed multiple episodes of the show, including the pilot. Genn directed the first two episodes of the second season of Netflix's Ginny and Georgia, on which he is also an executive producer. Other recent projects directed for television include multiple episodes of The Good Doctor, Charmed, The Hardy Boys, Ransom, Rookie Blue, House Party, Seed, Todd and the Book of Pure Evil, and HBO Canada's Call Me Fitz.

Genn additionally directed the "No Happy Endings Here" episode of Mary Kills People for Global, Burden of Truth's "Witch Hunt"/"The Devil in the Desert",

His directorial work also includes the feature film Old Stock and the Genie Award-nominated short film The Dog Walker, produced at the Canadian Film Centre in Toronto, where he completed his director's residency in 2003. His work has screened at festivals around the world and has even earned him nominations at the Canadian Screen Awards, Genie Awards, Gemini Awards, and Directors Guild of Canada Awards, as well as for the first ever Philip Borsos Award.

== Personal life ==
Genn grew up outside Vancouver, British Columbia. His ancestry is half-British and half-Japanese. Genn is the son of Canadian landscape painter Robert Genn, the brother of musician Dave Genn, and is the twin brother to artist and musician Sara Genn.

Genn is an alumnus of the film and TV program at the University of British Columbia.
