= Shawn Piller =

American television director, producer and writer

Shawn Piller is a principal and executive producer at Piller/Segan, an independent content production company.

== Career ==
In 1997, Shawn Piller produced his first film, Oakland Underground, and, in the following two years, he produced The Lonely Leave and co-produced Too Pure, which starred Danny Masterson.

In 1999, Piller partnered with his father, Michael Piller, to form Piller², an independent production company headquartered in Hollywood, California. After Michael's death in 2005, the company merged with producer Lloyd Segan's indie company The Segan Company to become The Piller-Segan Company. The latest addition to the company and now third partner was Scott Shepherd, and the company became known as Piller/Segan/Shepherd.

In 2000, Piller co-wrote and co-produced Day One, a science fiction pilot for The WB Network. He has also written episodes of Star Trek: The Next Generation and Star Trek: Voyager. He has been involved with the development of numerous pilot scripts under his deals with The WB, Granada Entertainment and Paramount Pictures.

In 2001, Segan approached the Pillers to develop a television series from Stephen King's novel The Dead Zone. The series starred Anthony Michael Hall and ran from 2002 to 2008 on the USA Network. In 2005, Wildfire debuted on the ABC Family channel, starring Deep Space Nine's Nana Visitor. The fourth and final season of Wildfire premiered in early 2008. Greek debuted in the summer of 2007 and became the longest-running series on ABC Family.

In May 2011, Piller directed Sexy Evil Genius starring Katee Sackhoff, Seth Green, Bill Baldwin, Michelle Trachtenberg and Harold Perrineau.

Piller was an executive producer on Syfy's Haven and directed 13 episodes of the series. He was also an executive producer for the Global series Private Eyes. He directed a total of 10 episodes over all five seasons of the series, including the final episode in 2021.

== Personal life ==
Piller's father, the late writer-producer Michael Piller, was the executive producer of Star Trek: The Next Generation, the co-creator and executive producer of Star Trek: Deep Space Nine and Star Trek: Voyager, and the co-creator and executive producer of UPN's Legend, as well as The Dead Zone and Wildfire.

Piller and his mother, Sandra Piller, are the principal officers of Piller Records. Piller is a graduate of the USC School of Cinematic Arts.

Piller was married to actress Lindsay Price from 2004 to 2007.
