= RX (The Gifted) =

"rX"
- The Gifted episode
- Promotional poster for the series featuring Emma Dumont's Polaris with green hair. This episode reveals this is her true hair color in a scene adapted from the early X-Men comics.
- Episode no.: Season 1 Episode 2
- Directed by: Len Wiseman
- Written by: Matt Nix
- Cinematography by: Bart Tau
- Editing by: Colleen Rafferty
- Production code: 1LAJ02
- Original air date: October 9, 2017
- Running time: 44:12

Guest appearances
- Garret Dillahunt as Roderick Campbell; Elena Satine as Dreamer; Folake Olowofoyeku as Scar; Chris Butler as Watkins; Sharon Gless as Ellen Strucker

Episode chronology
| ← Previous "eXposed" | Next → "eXodus" |
- The Gifted season 1

"rX" is the second episode of the American television series The Gifted, based on Marvel Comics' X-Men properties. It is connected to the X-Men film series, and follows two parents who take their family on the run after discovering their children's mutant abilities. The episode was written by series creator Matt Nix, and directed by Len Wiseman.

Stephen Moyer and Amy Acker star as Reed and Caitlin Strucker, parents on the run, alongside Sean Teale, Natalie Alyn Lind, Percy Hynes White, Coby Bell, Jamie Chung, Blair Redford, and Emma Dumont. Wiseman joined the series as an executive producer and director in August 2017. Showrunner Matt Nix wanted the episode to continue the story of the series' pilot rather than begin a new story, focusing on the ramifications of the prior episode including the overuse of abilities by Chung's Blink. The episode introduces several significant guest stars for the season, including Garret Dillahunt as Roderick Campbell and Elena Satine as Dreamer.

"rX" aired on Fox on October 9, 2017. It was watched by 3.79 million viewers, and received mostly positive reviews from critics, who thought it continued the momentum from the first episode.

== Plot ==
After teleporting several members of the mutant underground away from agents of the Sentinel Services (SS) in the previous episode, Clarice Fong falls unconscious and loses control of her abilities. A portal from the underground's base to an unknown rural road opens, sending part of a truck crashing into the base and injuring Caitlin Strucker. Her daughter Lauren is able to close the portal with her control over air molecules.

In prison, the mutant Lorna Dane / Polaris is given a collar that shocks her whenever she uses her abilities. She faces discrimination from the human inmates, including Scar, who was injured by a mutant in her past, and leads a group to physically attack Polaris. She fights through the pain of the shock collar to retaliate and crushes Scar between the prison fence and a metal table, leading to her being sent to solitary confinement. Also in custody, Caitlin's husband Reed is questioned by SS agent Jace Turner about the location of the mutant underground. After Turner threatens Reed's mother, Reed agrees to give up the mutants' location on the condition that he and his family goes free.

Caitlin, a trained nurse, and underground member Marcos Diaz race to a nearby hospital that still treats mutants. Diaz uses an injury from earlier to quickly see a doctor. Fong's abilities become more intense, opening portals to that same road more frequently, with first local police coming to investigate on the other side, and then SWAT. When Lauren is no longer able to close the portals, her brother Andy defends them with his telekinetic abilities. These disturb Fong even more, and portals beginning flashing around the compound, causing major damage and starting a hasty evacuation. Caitlin is able to get medication from the hospital to help Fong, but she and Diaz are forced to flee when a doctor believes from her injury that she is a victim of domestic abuse. They arrive back in time to help Fong and stop the portals from destroying the compound.

Later, Roderick Campbell, a scientist studying mutants, asks one of his subordinates to contact the lead SS agent on the Struckers' case, comparing Lauren and Andy's situation to that of two mutant siblings in an incident in the 1960s.

== Production ==
=== Development ===
By August 2017, Len Wiseman joined the series The Gifted as an executive producer, and was set to direct the show's second episode, titled "A New World". This came under an overall deal Wiseman had with production company 20th Century Fox TV, and extended a relationship that he had with series creator Matt Nix, the pair having worked together previously on the series APB. In September, the episode's title was changed to "rX".

=== Writing ===
The episode was written by Nix. Following on from the series' pilot, Nix said the second episode would be "super-continuous, and super-intense", adding, "If you liked the pace an scale of the pilot, we do not let up in the second episode." He said that the series would not become a procedural, with a "save the mutant of the week" formula, and would instead follow the ongoing story of the mutant underground as they both try to save other mutants and fight to protect themselves, though each episode still has a beginning, middle, and end. In this episode specifically, he said that the characters would be facing detours, for instance, "We've seen Blink's portals working great, but what if they don't? Really interesting things happen." Actress Jamie Chung added that the episode would explore "the ramifications of a mutant overexerting themselves". Chung also noted that the episode ends with a new pink marking appearing on Blink's face, after she previously only had one under her right eye. She explained that more markings appear on the character as she uses her abilities more, moving the character towards her comic appearance where she has multiple markings.

Following the reveal in the pilot that the character Polaris is pregnant, actress Emma Dumont said that "having a small, mutant baby inside of her, I think for a normal person it would make her be more cautious, but I think it's the total reverse where she's like, 'I have something in the world to care about and now I'm going to fight even harder,' and that is probably pretty dangerous." This episode reveals that Polaris has green hair, which she hides with dark hair dye. Her true hair color is revealed as she showers in prison, adapting a scene from the early X-Men comics where her green hair is also revealed after she showers.

=== Casting ===
The series stars Stephen Moyer as Reed Strucker, Amy Acker as Caitlin Strucker, Sean Teale as Marcos Diaz / Eclipse, Natalie Alyn Lind as Lauren Strucker, Percy Hynes White as Andy Strucker, Coby Bell as Jace Turner, Chung as Clarice Fong / Blink, Blair Redford as John Proudstar / Thunderbird, and Dumont as Lorna Dane / Polaris.

Elena Satine was revealed in August 2017 to have been cast in the series as Dreamer, a mutant who can "add or subtract" others' memories, to appear in the second episode. The next month, Garret Dillahunt was cast as Roderick Campbell, a "key recurring role" for the show. The guest cast for the second episode was also revealed by Fox in September; in addition to Satine, it included Dillahunt, as well as Joe Nenners as Agent Ed Weeks, Sharon Gless as Ellen Strucker, Hayley Lovitt as Sage, Chris Butler as Dr. Watkins, and Dinarte de Freitas as Pedro. Nenners, Lovitt, and de Freitas return from the series' first episode, while Gless previously worked with Nix on his series Burn Notice. Folake Olowofoyeku also guest stars in the episode as Scar, and Anissa Matlock portrays the "porcelain mutant".

=== Filming ===
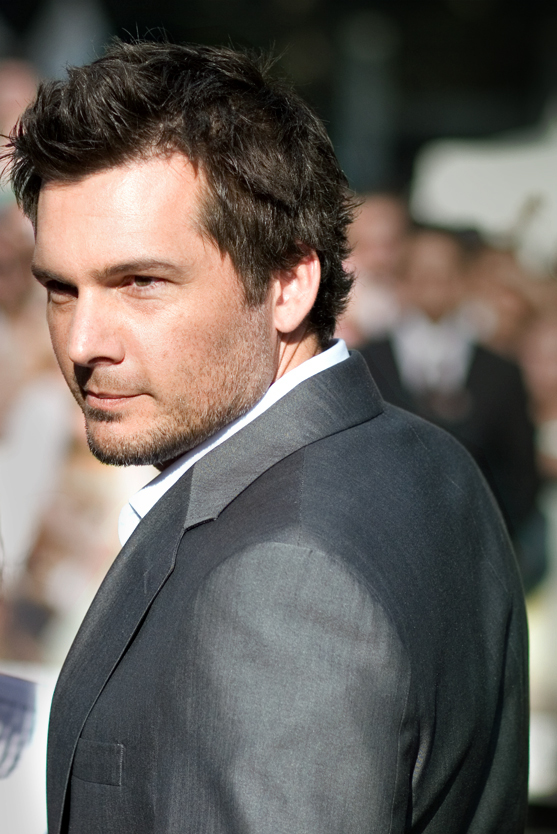
Newly-joined executive producer Len Wiseman directed this episode

In May 2017, the Dallas Film Commission announced that the rest of The Gifted's episodes would not be filmed in that city, like the pilot, after a decision on tax rebates in the state was made too late for the series' schedule. Filming was moved to Atlanta, Georgia, beginning July 17. This caused the series' setting to be changed from Dallas to Atlanta (with the pilot episode retroactively changed to match this). Nix said the production was "very fortunate" to have Wiseman directing the episode, and noted that it was a "bigger" episode than the pilot, with more time allocated to it for filming than the usual eight or nine days per episode for the series. Acker described Wiseman as very "detail-oriented ... he just really wanted everything to be right. There's never enough time, but he really made sure that everything worked and looked really cool."

For the stunt where a truck is cut in half by one of Blink's portals, the production literally cut a truck in half. To create the effect of dark hair dye being washed from Polaris's hair and revealing green hair, series' hair designer Charles Yusko created twelve different wigs and hair pieces, some of which could change color. The series opted for more "subdued shades of green" hair than the character is often portrayed with in the comics. The collar used to prevent Polaris from using her abilities resembles collars used to restrict powers on the island of Genosha in the comics.

== Release ==
=== Broadcast ===
"rX" aired on Fox on October 9, 2017. It was broadcast on CTV in Canada, and on Fox channels in more than 183 countries following its U.S. debut, using a "day-and-date launch" format.

=== Marketing ===
Executive producer Jeph Loeb and Wiseman attended a New York Comic Con panel on October 8, alongside cast members and other executive producers, to promote the episode and the rest of the series. The first fifteen minutes of the episode were shown.

== Reception ==
=== Ratings ===
In the United States the episode received a 1.2/4 percent share among adults between the ages of 18 and 49, meaning that it was seen by 1.2 percent of all households, and 4 percent of all of those watching television at the time of the broadcast. It was watched by 3.79 million viewers.

=== Critical response ===
Reviewing the episode for IGN, Joshua Yehl gave it a "great" score of 8 out of 10, calling it an "equally well-executed" follow-up to the series' pilot. He praised the expanded screen time for Acker and her performance, as well as Dumont's scenes such as her shower scene. Yehl highlighted the explorations of mutant healthcare and the lack of empathy that Reed and Caitlin initially have for mutants, and also the way the episode revealed teases of some long-running mysteries. He was less positive about the "opening/closing portal problem", but it "won [him] over" by the end of the episode, as well as the introduction of Satine's Dreamer who "seems to solely exist for exposition purposes". Writing for Den of Geek, Jim Dandy said the series continued to be a "solid entry into overall X-Men canon", feeling that it has the best depiction of the hardships of mutant life since the original X-Men (2000); that it had "completely thought out" its world; and "the focus on the family dynamic that adds heart to the whole thing", overcoming some unoriginal plotting.

At Flickering Myth, Rachel Bellwoar thought the episode was effective in exploring the state of mind that the characters are in after the pilot, and in acknowledging the lack of sympathy that Reed and Caitlin have had towards mutants until now. Bellwoar also thought the continued exploration of Lauren's past hiding her mutant abilities from her family made her "one of the show’s most fascinating characters". She did think that "the climax of Blink’s illness gets a bit wonky", and thought that the end tag introducing Dillahunt was unnecessary, and could have been left for the next episode. Jesse Hassenger of The A.V. Club graded the episode a 'B', feeling that the episode overcame a common television problem by maintaining the momentum from the pilot. He praised Wiseman's direction, saying that on television he "looks like a decent stylist; this episode was pretty cool-looking, and the prison scenes were particularly eye-catching. For better and for worse, the combination of ogling and badassery of Polaris’s scene in the prison showers is pure Wiseman." Hassenger did criticize the Reed/Turner scenes, particularly Moyer's performance, saying "his whole physicality feels off".

Kayti Burt of Collider gave the episode a "good" three stars out of five, calling it entertaining but mediocre. She thought the Caitlin/Diaz storyline was the best part of the episode, but criticized the show's main characters for their "white, non-mutant privilege" and for exhibiting behavior that the comics would have relegated to villains. Burt summarized, "The Gifted remains at its best when it keeps the pace fast, but the cracks in the narrative start to show whenever the characters slow down for a breath."
