= EXposed =

"eXposed"
- The Gifted episode
- Title card for the episode
- Episode no.: Season 1 Episode 1
- Directed by: Bryan Singer
- Written by: Matt Nix
- Cinematography by: Newton Thomas Sigel
- Editing by: Steven Lang
- Production code: 1LAJ01
- Original air date: October 2, 2017
- Running time: 44:41

Guest appearances
- Toks Olagundoye as Carla Jackson; Dale Godboldo as Ted Baird; Steffan Argus as Jack

Episode chronology
← Previous —	Next → "rX"
- The Gifted season 1

"eXposed" is the pilot and first episode of the American television series The Gifted, based on Marvel Comics' X-Men properties. It is connected to the X-Men film series, and follows two parents who take their family on the run after discovering their children's mutant abilities. The pilot was written by series creator Matt Nix, with frequent X-Men film director Bryan Singer directing the episode.

The Gifted received a put pilot commitment in July 2016, with Nix attached to write. An official pilot order came in January 2017, with Singer joining then. Casting began in February for a March filming start, in Dallas, Texas. The episode introduces an alternate timeline to the X-Men films where the X-Men team has disappeared, and focuses on the discrimination that mutants face from other people and the government. The show stars Stephen Moyer and Amy Acker, with Sean Teale, Natalie Alyn Lind, Percy Hynes White, Coby Bell, Jamie Chung, Blair Redford, and Emma Dumont. Stan Lee also appears, in a cameo appearance.

"eXposed" aired on Fox on October 2, 2017. It was watched by 4.9 million viewers, and received positive reviews from critics, particularly for its social commentary and cast.

== Plot ==
In Atlanta, Georgia, police pursue a mutant, Clarice Fong, who has used her ability to create portals to escape prison. She is found by a group of mutants from an underground community of mutants, including Lorna Dane / Polaris, John Proudstar / Thunderbird, and Marcos Diaz. They promise to help her get to safety, but when Diaz is shot, Polaris attacks the officer who shot him until she is captured. The others escape.

The next day, district attorney Reed Strucker tries to convince Polaris to cooperate with him in exchange for a reduced sentence, and notifies her that an examination revealed her to be pregnant. His children, Lauren and Andy, attend their school dance, where Andy is forced into a locker room by a group of bullies, until he screams and the whole building begins to break apart around them. Lauren races to find her brother, protecting herself and others from falling debris by conjuring shields out of the air. She finds Andy and the two flee.

At home, Andy explains to their mother Caitlin that he has developed mutant abilities and caused the incident at the dance, while Lauren reveals her own mutant abilities which she has been hiding for three years, knowing that any mutant that uses their powers is arrested and taken to detention centers by prosecutors like their father Reed. Agent Jace Turner of the Sentinel Services (SS) arrives at the Strucker house, looking for the children. The three of them escape and meet up with Reed, who suggests fleeing to safety in Mexico.

Reed contacts Diaz, and offers to give him information on Polaris in return for the mutant underground's help in getting them to Mexico. They meet with Diaz that night, with the mutant having not informed the other members of the underground of this. Turner and the SS arrive at the meeting, and release robotic devices that attack the group. They are saved by the appearance of Proudstar and Fong, the latter creating a portal for them all to escape, but Reed is not able to make it through and is captured.

== Production ==
=== Development ===
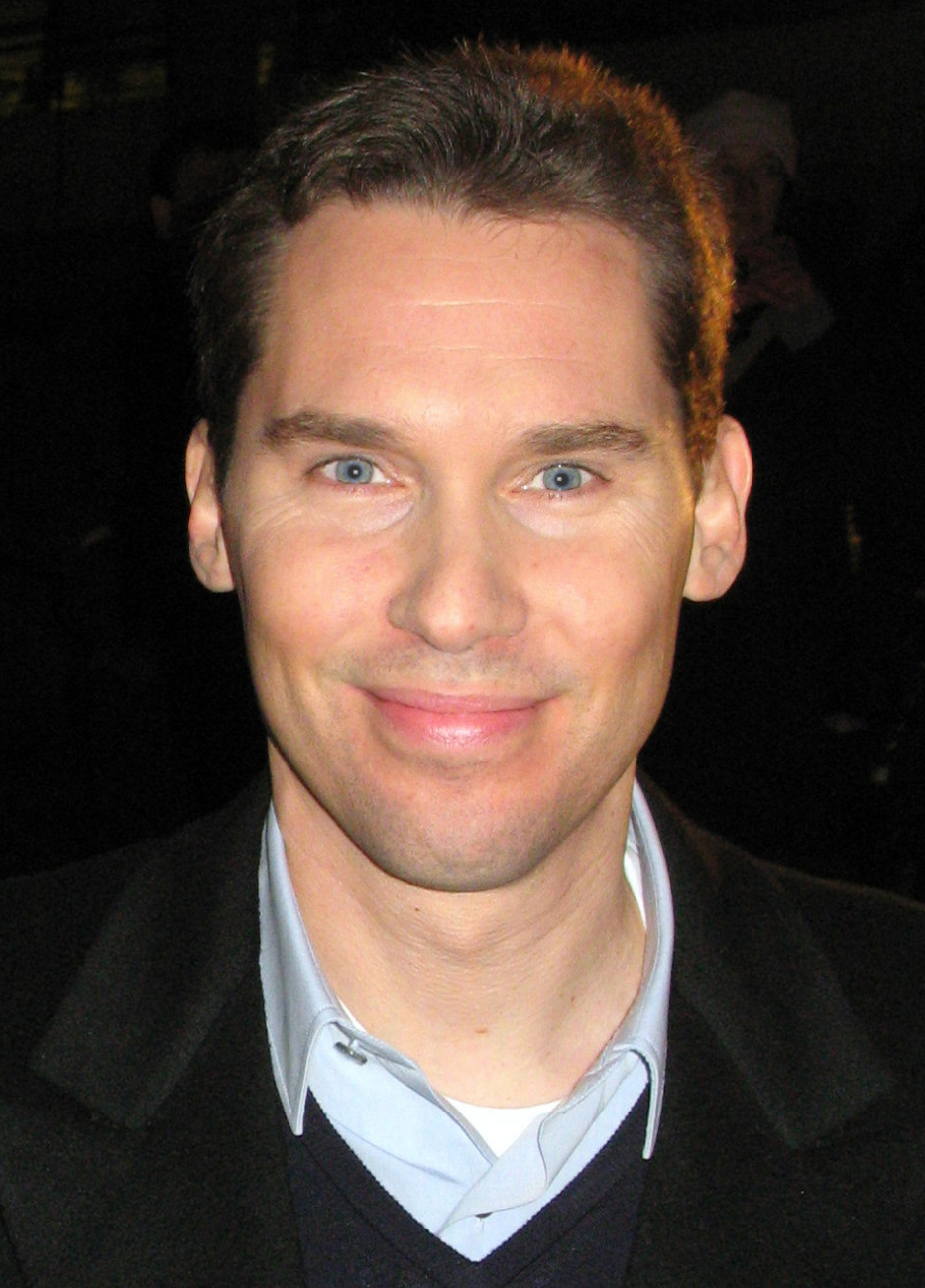
Bryan Singer, director of several of the X-Men films, returned to direct the pilot episode of The Gifted.

In July 2016, after a series based on the Hellfire Club, an X-Men comic property, did not move forward at Fox, the network made a put pilot commitment for a different X-Men based series. The new pilot, written by X-Men fan Matt Nix, was for an action-adventure series based on ordinary parents discovering their children's mutant abilities. Early versions of Nix's pilot script were received "enthusiastically" by Fox executives, and Fox chairman and CEO Gary Newman was expecting a final draft in early January 2017, with a pilot pickup within a few weeks of that. Fox officially ordered the series to pilot on January 24, and later revealed it to be titled "eXposed", and premiering in October.

Bryan Singer revealed on January 25 that he would direct the pilot, after previously directing several of the X-Men films. He decided to do this after a change in schedule for a film he was directing. He stressed that "tonally and visually it will be very, very different" from the films, and said that "some stuff [will] go down, visually, but at its heart it's a story about a family". Singer began prepping for production on January 27. When Singer first discussed the pilot with Nix, he compared Nix's description of it to the film Running on Empty; Nix had used that film in his original pitch for the series to executives, describing it as "Running on Empty with mutants".

=== Writing ===
Nix described the series as coming "at the world of mutants from the side"; the films and comics "have generally started with the X-Men and encountered the world outside" from their perspective, but the series looks to "take place inside the world of people who are [not] already X-Men and [do not yet] know that world." These issues reflect modern, real-world problems such as police attempting to kill mutants just because they look different, or the government only taking issue with mutants if they reveal themselves in public. Nix was influenced by the comic District X which is "just about a district in New York. It's where the mutants are ... dealing with crime, drugs, their relationships to each other."

When the Strucker children discover their abilities, Nix wanted to avoid clearly defining exactly what those abilities are immediately since "when your powers manifest, they don't come with a label. It's not like somebody pops up and says, 'Hey! You can do this!' When we think about powers on the show, what's the organic relationship between this person as a living, breathing human being, and their power? The idea is that what your power is and what you can do is influenced by who you are as a character." Nix decided to end the episode with the main characters separated, to avoid them "settling into a rut, saving a mutant every week. Separating them gives everybody a really deep emotional connection. On the mutant side, Eclipse wants Polaris back. On the Strucker side, they all want Reed, and they've gotta figure out where he is. There's a lot to do. I wanted to set up the pilot with plenty to do and a big emotional connection to what they're doing, to keep the story personal." He added, "The end of the pilot was really about getting these people together for a common problem, but they don't know each other, so what's going to happen now?"

=== Casting ===
In February 2017, Blair Redford was cast, later confirmed as John Proudstar / Thunderbird; Jamie Chung was cast as Clarice Fong / Blink, Stephen Moyer was cast as Reed Strucker; and Sean Teale was cast as Marcos Diaz / Eclipse. The next month, Natalie Alyn Lind joined as Lauren Strucker; Amy Acker was cast as Caitlin Strucker; Emma Dumont as Lorna Dane / Polaris; Percy Hynes White as Andy Strucker; and Coby Bell as Jace Turner.

The guest cast for the episode was revealed in September 2017, including Joe Nenners as Agent Ed Weeks, Matthew Tompkins as D.A. Cal Jones, Steffan Argus as Jack, Dalton Gray as Jake, Pierce Foster Bailey as Trevor, Giovanni Devito as Dax, Toks Olagundoye as Carla, and Jeff Daniel Phillips as Bartender. Dale Godboldo also guest stars in the episode, and Stan Lee makes a cameo appearance. Additional appearances in the episode include Dinarte de Freitas as Pedro, Josh Henry as Ben, Jason Jamal Ligon as Side-Eye, Hayley Lovitt as Sage, and Jermaine Rivers as Shatter.

=== Filming ===
Filming for the pilot, under the working title Heaven, began on March 13, 2017, in Dallas, Texas, and was completed by April 11. During filming, Moyer, Acker, Lind, and White spent time together doing "silly family activities around town", including a trip by Lind and White to Six Flags. For Lee's cameo, the producers learned that he was in Dallas for a comic book convention, and were told that the cameo could be filmed if it was done within a free two-hour period that Lee had before he was flying home. The scene was improvised at a bar location in 20 minutes, with actors who had not expected to be filming that day. Nix said that is "the kind of thing where I think people sometimes underestimate the degree to which we who make the show are just another group of fanboys trying to make something happen by the skin of our teeth."

Some reshoots for the pilot had also been carried out by the end of April. Moyer explained that his character was originally intended to be "more obviously out for himself and slightly less interested in his kids, slightly less interested in the marriage", but in discussions between himself and Nix the pair decided to try make the character more likeable, so some of the reshoots for the episode involved this. For instance, the scene where the character learns of his children's mutant abilities was cut from the episode, and a new scene was filmed with him receiving a call from his wife about the issue while he was driving home from work. Moyer added, "We want the audience to empathize with his plight at the beginning. So we made his journey less idiomatic, less opinionated to leave it slightly more ambiguous this way."

When the episode was filmed, it was set in Texas. However, production on the rest of the series was moved to Atlanta, Georgia, after a decision on tax rebates in Texas had not been made in time for production to resume there. The episode was then altered to be set in Atlanta, retroactively, so the rest of the series could be set there as well.

=== Music ===
Ahead of the episode's premiere, it was revealed that John Ottman and David Buckley were composing the score for the show, with only Ottman credited for the pilot. He previously scored several of the X-Men films for Singer. As an on-set joke, Ron Wasserman's theme from the 1990s X-Men animated series was used as a character's cell phone ring tone. It was decided that this should be kept in the final episode, though the studio thought it was too expensive. Nix said "there aren't a lot of those battles you get to win when you're making a network television show, but that one? We knew it cost more money than a regular ring tone, but it's so much fun so we're doing it."

== Release ==
=== Broadcast ===
"eXposed" aired on Fox on October 2, 2017. It was broadcast on CTV in Canada, and on Fox channels in more than 183 countries following its U.S. debut, using a "day-and-date launch" format.

=== Marketing ===
The first footage from the episode was revealed in a trailer for Fox's May 2017 Upfront presentation, which Hoai-Tran Bui of /Film said "looks like a Singer take on Heroes." Bui added, "The Gifted is a bit more by-the-numbers [than other X-Men series Legion], airing on a primetime network, spearheaded by X-Men movie director Singer, and clearly connected to the movie universe ... Whether that connection helps or hinders the series is yet to be seen—as is Singer's involvement, whose X-Men films become increasingly nonsensical and ... bad." The trailer had been viewed over 31 million times within a day of its release, including over 11 million views on YouTube. The first six minutes of the episode were released online on September 28, 2017.

=== Home media ===
Within a week of its broadcast on Fox, "eXposed" was released free to stream on iTunes, along with two featurettes about the series.

== Reception ==
=== Ratings ===
In the United States the episode received a 1.5/5 percent share among adults between the ages of 18 and 49, meaning that it was seen by 1.5 percent of all households, and 5 percent of all of those watching television at the time of the broadcast. It was watched by 4.9 million viewers. This was called a "solid start" to the series, and was noted to be higher than the season premiere of Lucifer in the same timeslot the year before, as well as the debut of the other new Marvel series of the season, Inhumans. Within three days, the episode's rating share for the 18 to 49 demographic had risen to 2.3, and its total viewership was up 2.4 million to 7.3 million viewers; this was the highest three-day increase for a Fox series released on Monday in over a year, and the highest three-day increase for any series released on Monday at 9 pm in three years.

=== Critical response ===
Giving his first impression of the series' pilot for TVLine, Matt Webb Mitovich praised the "instantly engaging premise" and visual effects. He felt the entire cast was solid, which he called "no easy feat with an ensemble this size", and also highlighted the clear establishment of the characters' relationships and the significant plot twists featured in the episode. Dominic Patten at Deadline Hollywood called the episode "quite good", feeling that the series is derivative of Heroes but "sets the stakes legitimately high" and covers timely issues. Joshua Yehl of IGN scored the episode a "great" 8 out of 10, feeling it "doesn't try to do anything markedly new with the mutant metaphor, but it hits every beat of that formula so well that it's a great time regardless." He thought the cast's performances elevated the "by-the-numbers" plot, especially those from Moyer and Dumont. Yehl felt that Singer focused on "what worked best about his most beloved entry in the franchise", X2, by focusing on intolerance.

Kelly Lawler from USA Today reacted positively to the episode, giving it three-and-a-half stars out of four and saying it "has a handle on both its source material and the best way to adapt it." Lawler praised the performances of Moyer and Dumont, and Nix's approach to the action scenes in the episode. Daniel Fienberg, writing for The Hollywood Reporter, said he could not call the series "mandatory or necessary viewing", but "a solid family dynamic and Bryan Singer's direction help Fox's new X-Men-adjacent drama get off to a decent start." Fienberg said the most essential element established in the episode was the Strucker family dynamic, but that this did become "soapy" in places and was only balanced out by the several action sequences. Christian Holub from Entertainment Weekly gave the pilot an "A−" rating, calling it a "great, fast-paced start" to the series, noting Singer's direction, and saying, "While expertly deploying many familiar tropes from the X-Men mythos, the show also feels like a genuinely new story rooted in our current cultural moment."

At The Washington Post, David Betancourt wrote that The Gifted is "surprisingly just as good as any other comic-book-inspired show on network television." He said the series had potential, and was "not something easily accomplished in the now-crowded field of live-action network and streaming superhero options." The A.V. Club's Jesse Hassenger graded the pilot a 'B−', feeling that it fell short of the standard established with Legion, didn't have any moments as "affecting as the best Bryan Singer X-Men movies", and did not "nail" the "moments of humanity in an ensemble of superpowered craziness", but said the series "holds a lot of promise. It's got a snappy pace, introducing a bunch of new mutants, a bunch of powers, the family that has to go on the run, the government agency that's after them, and a couple of serial-friendly cliffhangers both immediate and longer-range."
