= The Gifted season 1 =

The Gifted
- Season 1
- Promotional poster
- Showrunner: Matt Nix
- Starring: Stephen Moyer; Amy Acker; Sean Teale; Natalie Alyn Lind; Percy Hynes White; Coby Bell; Jamie Chung; Blair Redford; Emma Dumont
- No. of episodes: 13

Release
- Original network: Fox
- Original release: October 2, 2017 – January 15, 2018

Season chronology
- Next → Season 2

The first season of the American television series The Gifted is based on Marvel Comics' X-Men properties, and follows ordinary parents who take their family on the run after they discover their children's mutant abilities. The season is connected to the X-Men film series, set in an alternate timeline where the X-Men have disappeared. It was produced by 20th Century Fox Television in association with Marvel Television, with Matt Nix serving as showrunner.

Stephen Moyer and Amy Acker star as the parents, alongside Sean Teale, Natalie Alyn Lind, Percy Hynes White, Coby Bell, Jamie Chung, Blair Redford, and Emma Dumont. The show was ordered to series in May 2017, after a pilot was filmed in Dallas, Texas. Production on the rest of the season moved to Atlanta, Georgia, where the focus was on creating a grounded take on refugees. The season also deals with ideas of discrimination, and how the actions of some can become more extreme than others.

The season aired from October 2, 2017, to January 15, 2018, over 13 episodes. It received mostly positive reviews from critics, particularly for its social commentary and cast. The Gifted was renewed for a second season on January 4, 2018.

== Episodes ==
No. overall	No. in season	Title	Directed by	Written by	Original release date	Prod. code	U.S. viewers (millions)
1	1	"eXposed"	Bryan Singer	Matt Nix	October 2, 2017	1LAJ01	4.90
In Atlanta, Georgia, Clarice Fong escapes from prison with her teleporting abilities, and is rescued from police by members of a mutant underground that aims to protect persecuted mutants from the government. During this, Lorna Dane is captured by the police, and is later asked by district attorney Reed Strucker to cooperate with him in exchange for a reduced sentence. Reed's children, Lauren and Andy, go to a school dance that night, where Andy is attacked by a group of bullies. The stress causes Andy's mutant abilities to manifest, and he telekinetically causes major damage to the school. Lauren helps him escape, revealing that she is also a mutant with the ability to project force fields. The pair and their parents are forced to go into hiding immediately by the arrival of Sentinel Services (SS), an anti-mutant agency. Reed convinces a member of the underground, Marcos Diaz, to help them in exchange for information on Lorna, but SS agents, led by Jace Turner, also arrive at their meeting. Clarice is able to teleport everyone to safety, except for Reed, who is captured by the SS.
2	2	"rX"	Len Wiseman	Matt Nix	October 9, 2017	1LAJ02	3.79
Clarice falls unconscious from the effort of teleporting the group back to the underground's hideout, losing control of her abilities. Portals begin to open to an unknown road, causing an accident that is brought to the attention of police. Caitlin, a nurse, offers to look for medication that may help Clarice, and races to a nearby hospital that still treats mutants with Marcos, where they use an old injury to gain access to the medication. In prison, Lorna has a collar placed on her neck that inflicts a shock whenever she tries to use her abilities. Lorna faces discrimination and attacks from the other prisoners, and when she pushes through the pain of her collar to fight back, she is put in solitary confinement. Reed is interrogated by Jace, who tries various techniques to get Reed's cooperation, including interrogating Reed's mother Ellen. Caitlin and Marcos return in time to help Clarice before her portals cause major damage and force the underground to evacuate. Reed agrees to give up Jace the location of the underground in exchange for the freedom of his family.
3	3	"eXodus"	Scott Peters	Rashad Raisani	October 16, 2017	1LAJ03	3.46
Reed, being tracked by Jace, meets up with a mutant that he knows is working with Marcos, and he agrees to smuggle Reed to the underground, but Reed decides to not put the mutants in harm and returns to Turner. Clarice begins working with John Proudstar to control her abilities, but does not have someone that she truly cares about because of her emotions. Trying to help the underground, Caitlin secretly leaves and finds her brother Daniel, who she says has "connections", and is accompanied by her children. Daniel is unwilling to help, and when news gets out that they are there the Struckers are confronted by locals who want to keep their neighborhood safe. They escape the house with the help of Marcos and John. Clarice creates a portal for the group to return to the underground, but can only do this with strong feelings for John, implanted by the mutant Dreamer. Jace turns down an offer for help from scientist Roderick Campbell, who is interested in the Strucker children.
4	4	"eXit strategy"	Karen Gaviola	Meredith Lavender & Marcie Ulin	October 23, 2017	1LAJ04	3.36
Two years ago, the underground helped several mutants escape from an SS "Relocation Center", but John's best friend Pulse—who can short out electrical circuits and other mutants' abilities—was believed to have been killed. Now, the underground plans to rescue Reed and Lorna from the SS before they are delivered to a similar center, one that inmates do not return from. Marcos gets information on the route they will be taken from the cartel he used to work for, now run by his former girlfriend Carmen Guerra. She forces him to use his abilities to torture someone for her in exchange for the information. The underground attacks the convoy transporting Reed and Lorna, with Andy and Lauren combining their abilities to stop the vehicles. They all lose their abilities when Pulse appears, alive and working for the SS. John knocks Pulse unconscious, Lorna breaks herself and Reed out, and they all escape. Meanwhile, Clarice continues to remember her feelings for John, but he tells her that they have never been together.
5	5	"boXed in"	Jeremiah Chechik	Jim Campolongo	October 30, 2017	1LAJ05	3.43
John takes the Struckers back to the underground, where a mutant named Fade recognizes Reed as having been working with Jace; many of the underground's members are uncomfortable with Reed joining them. In order to prove his loyalty, Reed suggests using himself as bait to lure away the SS agents. John tasks Fade with helping Reed, and they are successful. Meanwhile, Caitlin, Lauren, and Andy are able to save the life of an injured mutant, Trader. Having earned the underground's trust, the Struckers decide to stay and fight with them. Marcos and Lorna attack an SS blockade and capture Jace. Dreamer and Clarice join them, as they are surrounded by the SS. Dreamer begins searching Jace's memories for information, learning of the program that converted Pulse to an SS agent. She is unable to finish before they have to flee, leaving Jace believing that his daughter is still alive despite her death during a mutant protest four years earlier. Clarice later confronts Dreamer about altering her memories.
6	6	"got your siX"	Craig Siebels	Melinda Hsu Taylor	November 6, 2017	1LAJ06	3.17
Clarice confronts John about him not telling her what Dreamer did to her memories, and decides to leave the underground. The group plans to attack a federal facility where Pulse was taken without Clarice's help; Reed, Marcos, and Andy go to break in and steal information on the mutants who are now working for the SS. John worries that these mutants could be the deciding factor in a war that the X-Men believed was coming (they put John in charge of the underground before they disappeared). Reed becomes concerned with Andy's abilities and how he enjoys using them for his own benefit, and attempts to gain Andy's trust as his father again. After stealing the information, the trio are followed by police into an SS ambush. Lorna takes Lauren and another young mutant, visual illusionist Wes, to help them. Meanwhile, Jace is given a mandatory leave for his reborn grief, but ignores this and instead begins a new partnership with Campbell, giving him the information about Andy and Lauren in exchange for his help.
7	7	"eXtreme measures"	Stephen Surjik	Michael Horowitz	November 13, 2017	1LAJ07	3.00
Guerra forces Marcos to help her on another job, this time destroying a rival's shipment of drugs; Lorna and Dreamer follow him after the former discovered he was lying about his whereabouts, and see Marcos working with Guerra. John tracks down Clarice, and offers to help her find the road that the portals were opening to when she was sick. They realize that the road leads to the home for mutants that she lived in as a child, but it is now derelict after SS agents stormed the building and killed its inhabitants. She agrees to rejoin the fight. From the stolen information, the underground learns that Wes has a criminal background, leading to him leaving for another underground group, and that Reed's father may have been involved with Campbell's program to turn mutants when he worked for Trask Industries. Now, Campbell and Jace prepare to send these mutants, called Hounds, undercover within the underground. When a United States Department of Justice official attempts to stop the pair from using their illegal actions, one of the Hounds makes her have a stroke.
8	8	"threat of eXtinction"	Steven DePaul	Carly Soteras	November 20, 2017	1LAJ08	2.90
The underground rescue a group of refugees, but a telepath among them, Esme, reveals another of the mutants to be a Hound. The latter is taken hostage, and Esme is able to help read her mind; they learn that she was taken hostage by Trask Industries, and their work on her included addicting her to the drug Kick. Reed and John visit Reed's estranged father Otto, who used to work for Trask. Otto reveals that his father and aunt, Andreas and Andrea von Strucker, were the mutant terrorists Fenris. They had extremely powerful abilities, which they passed on to Otto; his work at Trask focused on suppressing the mutant X-gene, and he prevented Reed from developing these abilities. Lauren and Andy now have the same abilities as the von Struckers, and can become as powerful as them if their powers are combined. Campbell and SS agents arrive to interrogate Otto, and he attacks them with his abilities to protect Reed and John. Otto is able to overcome Pulse's mutant suppressing, releasing a blast that injures Campbell and kills Pulse.
9	9	"outfoX"	Liz Friedlander	Brad Marques	December 4, 2017	1LAJ09	2.81
Reed tells his family about his history as a mutant, and about the von Struckers and their terrorist activities. He and Caitlin test Andy and Lauren to see if they could become as powerful as the twins; holding hands, the pair feel the power to destroy the entire building, and are only stopped by Reed separating them. Desperate to rescue her family from Trask, Esme uses her abilities to manipulate the others into agreeing with a plan of attack: Clarice, Dreamer, and the Struckers will take out a power plant supporting the Trask facility, which can then be attacked by her, Lorna, Marcos, and John. Jace predicts this, and organizes an unofficial SS task force to storm the power plant before it can be disabled. Clarice and Dreamer are captured trying to allow Andy and Lauren to escape, as Reed and Caitlin watch in horror from a van outside. Trapped in the basement, Andy and Lauren join hands, but Andy stops them from using their combined abilities before they kill all the building's inhabitants. They surrender themselves to the SS.
10	10	"eXploited"	Craig Siebels	Jim Campolongo	December 11, 2017	1LAJ10	2.78
Lorna wants to immediately attack the SS, but Reed and Caitlin argue for a diplomatic solution that will not endanger their children, potentially reaching out to some of Reed's old contacts about Trask and the Hound program. Esme talks to Reed and Caitlin in secret, and suggests that they go to Jace and hope that his better nature prevails. When Esme tells the other mutants what the couple intend to do, they prepare to attack. At Trask Industries, a heavily scarred Campbell forces Andy and Lauren to demonstrate their combined powers by killing Dreamer, and they are able to dent an apparently "indestructible" adamantium wall. After he is confronted by the Struckers, Jace plans to arrest them, but is convinced by his wife not to. Jace goes to Trask to transfer the mutants back to the SS. The mutants use this opportunity to attack, but they are betrayed by Esme. She makes the guards kill each other and themselves, and releases her identical sisters, Phoebe and Sophie Frost, who have the same abilities as her.
11	11	"3 X 1"	David Straiton	Melinda Hsu Taylor	January 1, 2018	1LAJ11	2.54
The Frost sisters approach the underground for help in stopping the Hound program, though they are doing so to support their own agenda of rebuilding the Hellfire Club. The underground members refuse, while Reed and Caitlin decide to take their family to Mexico. They stop at another refugee base on the way, where they reunite with Wes. One of the sisters visits Andy, asking him to reconsider leaving. Another visits Lorna, and uses knowledge of her mysterious birth father—who once led the Hellfire Club—and her unborn baby to try manipulate her into assisting them. Jace and Campbell launch an attack on the Struckers' location, using Hounds who can combine their abilities with technology developed from Lauren and Andy to start destroying the building and arrest mutants. Lorna, Clarice, Marcos, and John arrive to rescue them, but only the intervention of the sisters allows them to successfully escape. The underground formally partners with the Hellfire Club, unaware that the sisters have given the SS the location of the base.
12	12	"eXtraction"	Scott Peters	Michael Horowitz	January 15, 2018	1LAJ12	3.42
Lorna, Marcos, John, and Clarice join the Frost sisters at a safe house where Esme explains that when the X-Men established the underground before their disappearance, their rival group the Brotherhood established the new Hellfire Club before their own disappearance. Campbell meets with anti-mutant Senator Montez at the Humanity Today conference, where he talks about his advancements in the fight to eradicate the X-gene; Montez agrees to give political support to expanding the Hound program for use across the country. Meanwhile, SS agents search for more information on Otto's research. Learning that they are going after Ellen, the Struckers go to her office and persuade her to go into hiding. Andy and Lauren disagree on how much force to use when holding off arriving SS agents. Ellen gives them the name of Otto's research partner, Madeline Risman, before departing. The underground mutants infiltrate the conference with the Frost sisters to abduct Campbell, but flee when he uses children as human shields before SS forces arrive.
13	13	"X-roads"	Stephen Surjik	Matt Nix & Jim Garvey	January 15, 2018	1LAJ13	3.42
Four years earlier, Lorna had been approached at a mental hospital by attorney Evangeline Whedon, who recruited her for the underground on the behalf of the X-Men. Now, Campbell and Montez are set to fly to Washington. The Frost sisters convince Lorna to embrace her heritage and stop them. Jace tracks the Struckers with a new pair of Hounds to the underground's headquarters, and lays siege to it. Reed leads a defense of the building with the few remaining fighters, while Caitlin oversees an evacuation through an escape tunnel. When the Hounds break into the building, Andy and Lauren remain behind to let the last of the underground escape. They combine their abilities, disintegrating the entire building and the Hounds inside it. Meanwhile, Lorna destroys the plane that Campbell and Montez are in. A disgruntled and defeated Jace quits when his superiors at the SS attempt to set him up as a scapegoat. The underground regroups in Nashville, Tennessee, where Lorna and the Frosts arrive seeking recruits for the Hellfire Club. Several choose to join them, including Andy despite his family’s pleas.

== Cast and characters ==
=== Main ===
- Stephen Moyer as Reed Strucker
- Amy Acker as Caitlin Strucker
- Sean Teale as Marcos Diaz / Eclipse
- Natalie Alyn Lind as Lauren Strucker
- Percy Hynes White as Andy Strucker
- Coby Bell as Jace Turner
- Jamie Chung as Clarice Fong / Blink
- Blair Redford as John Proudstar / Thunderbird
- Emma Dumont as Lorna Dane / Polaris

=== Recurring ===
- Hayley Lovitt as Teresia Karisik / Sage
- Joe Nemmers as Ed Weeks
- Jeff Daniel Phillips as Fade
- Jermaine Rivers as Shatter
- Garret Dillahunt as Roderick Campbell
- Elena Satine as Sonya Simonson / Dreamer
- Skyler Samuels as the Frost Sisters

== Production ==
=== Development ===
Fox made a put pilot commitment in July 2016 for an X-Men based series, written by Matt Nix. His initial pitch for the series, "Running on Empty with mutants", was met with applause by executives. It was criticized for including too much story in the pilot, but Nix moved some of these ideas to later episodes. By January 2017, Nix hoped to see the season run for 12 or 13 episodes, rather than the traditional 22, while Fox chairman and CEO Gary Newman was expecting a final draft of the pilot script and planned to give a pilot pickup within a few weeks of that; Fox officially ordered the series to pilot at the end of the month, and to series, as The Gifted, in May. In August, Len Wiseman joined as a director and executive producer for the season, which consists of 13 episodes.

=== Writing ===
The series is not a procedural, and does not have a "save the mutant of the week" formula, instead following the ongoing story of the mutant underground as they both try to save other mutants and fight to protect themselves. Each episode does still have a beginning, middle, and end, including a flashback at the start of each episode focused on a particular character's history. Where the films and comics generally tell stories starting with the X-Men encountering "the world outside", Nix wanted to approach the story from the perspective of outsiders who are learning about the mutant world. The series also explores issues that reflect modern, real-world problems such as police attempting to kill mutants just because they look different, or the government only taking issue with mutants if they reveal themselves in public. The series' mutant underground is inspired by the Underground Railroad. A major struggle for the central parents of the series is that they are human and their children are mutants, and while they may sympathize with the mutants around them, "there's still a difference between them and the mutants and there's no getting around it". They also have to balance trying to help the cause with protecting their family.

Noting a growing trend in shorter, self-contained television seasons, Nix said in October 2017 that he wanted The Gifted to feel more like a traditional, long-running story and have each season end in a satisfying way that does not feel "close-ended". The season's fourth episode was designed to launch the full story arc, reuniting the main characters following the events of the first three episodes and showing their changed mindsets—the Strucker family gains a new appreciation of the mutant struggle for them to carry forward as they join the fight, while Polaris's time in prison has changed her outlook as well. The episode also reveals that mutants can be turned against each other in an adaptation of the Hound Program from the comics. The story arc of the season builds to a war that the X-Men believed was coming, and the series' characters having to decide how they wish to fight that war. It ends with the mutant Polaris having to decide whether she wants to follow the more extreme views of her father Magneto, or align herself more with the less extreme views of her boyfriend Eclipse. This creates the potential of two groups of mutants fighting each other, rather than uniting against Sentinel Services. Nix acknowledged that the final scene of the season is reminiscent of the end of the film X-Men: First Class, where Magneto recruits mutants for his own, more extreme group, but felt that this was a central theme to the X-Men and "constant throughout this universe. I think certainly we wanted to do our own version of that."

=== Casting ===
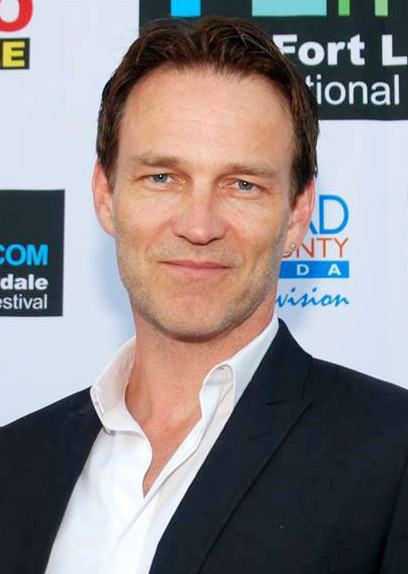
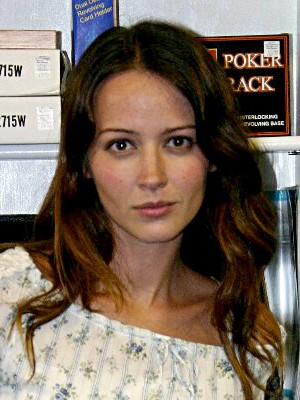
Stephen Moyer and Amy Acker star in the series.

In February 2017, Blair Redford was cast, later confirmed as John Proudstar / Thunderbird; Jamie Chung was cast as Clarice Fong / Blink, Stephen Moyer was cast as Reed Strucker; and Sean Teale was cast as Marcos Diaz / Eclipse. The next month, Natalie Alyn Lind joined as Lauren Strucker; Amy Acker was cast as Caitlin Strucker; Emma Dumont as Lorna Dane / Polaris; Percy Hynes White as Andy Strucker; and Coby Bell as Jace Turner.

Elena Satine was revealed in August 2017 to have been cast in the series as Dreamer, a mutant who can "add or subtract" others' memories, to first appear in the second episode. In September 2017, Garret Dillahunt joined the series in the "key recurring role" of Roderick Campbell, and Skyler Samuels was revealed to have joined the series as Esme in November, soon said to be another "key recurring role" for the series. Esme was revealed to be one of the Frost siblings, with Samuels also portraying her sisters Phoebe and Sophie. Also appearing throughout the series are Hayley Lovitt, Jeff Daniel Phillips, and Jermaine Rivers as the mutants Sage, Fade, and Shatter, respectively; and Joe Nemmers as Ed Weeks, a Sentinel Services agent.

=== Design ===
The costumes for the pilot were designed by Louise Mingenbach, costume designer for several of the X-Men films. She worked to incorporate the mutant characters' abilities into their costumes, such as adding metallic elements to Polaris's costume like rings that she can use as weapons and steel-toed boots that she can use to levitate. Cameron Dale took over from Mingenbach for the rest of the season. For Dale, the most important aspect of the series' costumes was making them appear grounded and realistic for a refugee/on-the-run setting. This meant using clothing that would logically be worn in real life, such as typical clothes for teenagers to wear to high school, and then repeating elements throughout the season to show the characters having a limited set of clothes that gets aged the more they wear them.

=== Filming ===
Singer, the director of several of the X-Men films, decided to direct the series' pilot episode himself after a change in schedule for a film he was directing. He stressed that "tonally and visually it will be very, very different" from the films, and said that there will be "some stuff go down, visually, but at its heart it is a story about a family". Singer began prepping for production on January 27, 2017. Filming for the pilot, under the working title Heaven, began on March 13, 2017, in Dallas, Texas, and was completed by April 11. Some reshoots for the pilot had also been carried out by the end of that month.

In May 2017, the Dallas Film Commission announced that the rest of The Gifted's episodes would not be filmed in the city. The series' production had put off the decision as long as they could, waiting for a decision on tax rebates in the state to be made by the Texas Legislature, but ultimately ran out of time and chose to film the rest of the series elsewhere. At the start of July, filming was revealed to be resuming in Atlanta, Georgia, beginning July 17. On filming in the state, Dumont stated, "We love filming in Georgia, because it was such a big part of the civil rights movement in the United States." Because of this move, the series' setting was changed from Dallas to Atlanta (with the pilot episode retroactively changed to match this). Filming in Atlanta takes place at Atlanta Metro Studios, on a filming schedule of eight or nine days per episode, though more time was allocated to the filming of the second episode, which Nix felt was a "bigger" episode than the others.

=== Shared universe connections ===
Nix noted in July 2017 that the film X-Men: Days of Future Past established multiple, different timelines or "streams" in the X-Men universe, and that the series would take advantage of those to avoid the films and comics and instead do "our own thing". He explained that in the series' "stream", the X-Men have disappeared, due to a "bit of a 9/11 event, that caused enormous social upheaval and a lot of hatred towards mutants." Nix later elaborated that it was a "necessity ... to stay out of the way of the movies" but he felt this worked as a "virtue" for the series, such as not mentioning Magneto by name to avoid the films, but still referencing the character in a way that makes it "a feature of the characters that they don’t really want to talk about" him, similar to Voldemort. Alternate versions of elements from the films appear in the season, including Sentinels, mutant-hunting robots that appeared in several of the films, and the company Trask Industries. To avoid clashing with the version of Bolivar Trask portrayed by Peter Dinklage in Days of Future Past, the writers chose not to include or mention that character at all and instead introduced the character of Roderick Campbell as the leader of the organization.

== Release ==
=== Broadcast ===
The season began airing in the United States on Fox on October 2, 2017, and ran for 13 episodes, concluding with a 2-hour season finale on January 15, 2018. It was broadcast in Canada on CTV, and in more than 183 countries on Fox, following its U.S. debut, using a "day-and-date launch" format.

=== Marketing ===
With the official series order, Fox released a brief teaser for the series which /Film's Jacob Hall described as "bland", particularly "arriving in the wake of Logan, Deadpool, and FX's Legion, each of which proved that there's plenty of gas in the tank for Mutantkind, provided that everyone involved is willing to really shake things up and go for broke." This was followed a week later by a full length trailer for Fox's May 2017 Upfront presentation, which Hoai-Tran Bui, also of /Film, said "looks like a Singer take on Heroes." Bui added, "The Gifted is a bit more by-the-numbers [than Legion], airing on a primetime network, spearheaded by X-Men movie director Singer, and clearly connected to the movie universe ... Whether that connection helps or hinders the series is yet to be seen—as is Singer's involvement, whose X-Men films become increasingly nonsensical and…bad." The trailer had been viewed over 31 million times within a day of its release, including over 11 million views on YouTube. This was compared to the performance of the first trailer for This Is Us the year before, which went on to be a critical and commercial success. Also for Fox's Upfront, "government agents" from the series' Sentinel Services agency were running a mobile "Mutant Testing Center" in New York City on May 15, offering genetic tests to see if participants have the "mutant gene". The test results "about who they are and where they came from" would be mailed to the participants in about a month. Footage from the pilot was screened at a 2017 San Diego Comic-Con panel featuring cast and crew members, and the beginning of the second episode was debuted at a similar panel for the show at New York Comic Con later that year.

== Reception ==
=== Ratings ===
Viewership and ratings per episode of The Gifted season 1
No.	Title	Air date	Rating/share (18–49)	Viewers (millions)	DVR (18–49)	DVR viewers (millions)	Total (18–49)	Total viewers (millions)
1	"eXposed"	October 2, 2017	1.5/5	4.90	1.3	3.61	2.8	8.49
2	"rX"	October 9, 2017	1.2/4	3.79	1.2	3.04	2.4	6.83
3	"eXodus"	October 16, 2017	1.1/4	3.46	1.0	2.86	2.1	6.31
4	"eXit strategy"	October 23, 2017	1.0/3	3.36	1.1	2.84	2.1	6.20
5	"boXed in"	October 30, 2017	1.1/3	3.43	0.9	2.53	2.0	5.95
6	"got your siX"	November 6, 2017	1.0/4	3.17	0.9	2.50	1.9	5.67
7	"eXtreme measures"	November 13, 2017	1.0/3	3.00	0.9	2.42	1.9	5.42
8	"threat of eXtinction"	November 20, 2017	0.9/3	2.90	0.9	2.26	1.8	5.16
9	"outfoX"	December 4, 2017	0.8/3	2.81	0.9	2.28	1.7	5.08
10	"eXploited"	December 11, 2017	0.8/3	2.78	—N/a	—N/a	—N/a	—N/a
11	"3 X 1"	January 1, 2018	0.7/2	2.54	0.9	2.22	1.6	4.76
12	"eXtraction"	January 15, 2018	1.0/4	3.42	0.7	1.80	1.7	5.20
13	"X-roads"	January 15, 2018	1.0/4	3.42	0.7	1.79	1.7	5.22

The series debuted higher than the season premiere of Lucifer in the same timeslot the year before, became a "solid ratings performer" for Fox, ranking the third best new drama series of the season, leading to a second season renewal.

=== Critical response ===
The review aggregator website Rotten Tomatoes reported a 74% approval rating, with an average rating of 6.67/10 based on 50 reviews. The website's consensus states, "The Gifted's first season lays a solid foundation for an involving superhero drama that powers past the origin-story doldrums by focusing on grounded, topical stories over mindless action and special effects." Metacritic, which uses a weighted average, assigned a score of 63 out of 100 based on 22 reviews, indicating "generally favorable" reviews.

Giving his first impression of the series' pilot for TVLine, Matt Webb Mitovich praised the "instantly engaging premise" and visual effects. He felt the entire cast was "solid", which he called "no easy feat with an ensemble this size", and also highlighted the clear establishment of the characters' relationships. He concluded by noting that the series would be facing tough opposition in terms of ratings, but that there was a chance for the show to be more successful than Gotham (which it replaced in Fox's airing schedule). Also reviewing the first episode, Dominic Patten of Deadline Hollywood praised the series as being superior to Marvel's Inhumans, and particularly noted its high stakes and timely themes. He did feel that there were elements in the episode that were derivative of Heroes, but ultimately summed up the episode as "quite good".

Daniel Fienberg from The Hollywood Reporter wrote, "The Gifted gets points for including X-Men characters with some name recognition and for acknowledging its place within the bigger franchise. That, however, raises expectations, too, as does Singer's adroit work with a budget that no subsequent director is likely to have. Three or four effects-driven set pieces ... balance out the soapy family moments. I have very little confidence that The Gifted will be able to achieve that balance in subsequent episodes, but I'll definitely be watching to find out". Joshua Yehl of IGN felt the pilot "delivers everything you'd expect from a show based in the world of the X-Men ... It may not be as thought-provoking as Legion, but it doesn't try to be." Yehl thought the best element of the series was how it "sets up a 'normal' family where the father makes a living off of sending mutants to jail and the son casually tosses out a mutant slur at the dinner table, and then forces those same people to rely on mutants to survive".

=== Comparison to Nazism ===
Discussing the series, Drew Koch of Bustle magazine noted that it explored themes such as the persecution of minority groups, sacrificing freedom for safety, and criticizing "big government". He highlighted the antagonistic agency Sentinel Services, feeling that giving it the initials "SS" was a reference to the Schutzstaffel, a paramilitary division of Nazi Germany. USA Today's Brian Truitt also noted this reference, and the character Polaris directly calling out the government agents as Nazis, along with the mutant underground being patterned after the Underground Railroad.
