= The Gifted (American TV series) =

2017 American superhero television series

- Genre: Action-adventure; Drama; Science fiction; Superhero
- Created by: Matt Nix
- Based on: Marvel Comics
- Showrunner: Matt Nix
- Starring: Stephen Moyer; Amy Acker; Sean Teale; Natalie Alyn Lind; Percy Hynes White; Coby Bell; Jamie Chung; Blair Redford; Emma Dumont; Skyler Samuels; Grace Byers
- Composers: John Ottman; David Buckley
- Country of origin: United States
- Original language: English
- No. of seasons: 2
- No. of episodes: 29

Production
- Executive producers: Stan Lee; Alan Fine; Karim Zreik; Joe Quesada; Jim Chory; Jeph Loeb; Len Wiseman; Simon Kinberg; Bryan Singer; Lauren Shuler Donner; Matt Nix
- Producer: Neal Ahern
- Production locations: Dallas, Texas (pilot); Atlanta, Georgia (seasons 1–2)
- Running time: 45–47 minutes
- Production companies: Flying Glass of Milk Productions; The Donners' Company; Bad Hat Harry Productions; Kinberg Genre; Marvel Television; 20th Century Fox Television

Original release
- Network: Fox
- Release: October 2, 2017 – February 26, 2019

The Gifted is an American superhero television series created by Matt Nix for Fox. Based on Marvel Comics featuring the superhero team the X-Men, it is set in an alternate timeline to the X-Men film series where the X-Men have disappeared. The show was produced by 20th Century Fox Television in association with Marvel Television, with Nix serving as showrunner.

The series stars Stephen Moyer and Amy Acker as ordinary parents who take their family on the run after they discover their children's mutant abilities. Sean Teale, Natalie Alyn Lind, Percy Hynes White, Coby Bell, Jamie Chung, Blair Redford, and Emma Dumont also star in the show, with Skyler Samuels and Grace Byers joining them with the second season. The series received a put pilot commitment at Fox after a previous attempted X-Men television series did not move forward at the network in 2016; The Gifted was ordered to series in May 2017.

The Gifted's first season aired from October 2, 2017, to January 15, 2018, and consisted of 13 episodes. It received mostly positive reviews from critics and "solid" viewership. The second season began airing on September 25, 2018, consisting of 16 episodes. On April 17, 2019, Fox canceled the series after two seasons.

== Premise ==
Two ordinary parents take their family on the run from the government when they discover that their children have mutant abilities, and join an underground community of mutants who have to fight to survive. At the end of the first season, several members of the underground leave to join the Inner Circle, and the second season sees conflict between these groups as well as others with their own extreme ideologies.

== Cast and characters ==
- Stephen Moyer as Reed Strucker:
  A father of mutants trying to balance his family responsibilities with his job as a district attorney. It is later revealed that Reed is a mutant with the ability to generate and manipulate energy, as well as disintegrate matter. Moyer said of the character, "He thinks he's doing the right thing by moving [the mutants]. He does know these camps aren't particularly nice. He knows a few people he's captured have disappeared. He also knows this could happen to his kids. He has no choice but to go on the run."
- Amy Acker as Caitlin Strucker:
  A mother and nurse struggling with her "increasingly challenging" teenage children. Showrunner Matt Nix said that though Caitlin does not have mutant powers, she is not "just a mom" or "just the doctor" in the series, and "over the course of the show I really love the idea of showing the evolution of a suburban mom into an underground warrior."
- Sean Teale as Marcos Diaz / Eclipse:
  A rebellious mutant who can absorb and manipulate photons. Eclipse was rejected by his human parents, and grew up smuggling drugs from Mexico to the United States. The mutant underground uses him to smuggle mutants to safety in Mexico. The character was created for the series, but has had his powers compared to Sunspot and his personality to Wolverine and Havok.
- Natalie Alyn Lind as Lauren Strucker:
  One of the series' central children, a "perfect" kid. Her mutant power allows her to create force fields by pushing together molecules of air or water.
- Percy Hynes White as Andy Strucker:
  One of the series' central children, a sensitive loner who keeps to himself. His mutant power is a form of telekinesis, being able to pull things apart at a molecular level with his mind.
- Coby Bell as Jace Turner:
  A man struggling with the cold-blooded requirements of his job. Turner is a Sentinel Services agent, trying to find the Struckers and the other mutants. Nix said the character is "more than just a villain hoping to round up every last superpowered human," but is instead trying to balance protecting society with taking away the rights of mutants.
- Jamie Chung as Clarice Fong / Blink:
  A "sarcastic, lively" mutant with teleportation powers. An "independently minded" member of the mutant underground, Blink begins the series using her abilities as "a way out of situations she doesn't want to be in", but her abilities and relationship to them evolve throughout the series. Chung wears heavy-duty contact lenses to portray Blink's mutant green eyes, and also has pink markings on her face.
- Blair Redford as John Proudstar / Thunderbird:
  A strong-willed mutant possessing superhuman strength, durability, enhanced healing and superhuman senses. He is leader of the underground community. Nix said the character is "dealing with his own issues of feeling the weight of thousands of years of Apache history and mutant history and an obligation to both families."
- Emma Dumont as Lorna Dane / Polaris:
  A brave and loyal mutant whose abilities include controlling magnetism. She is introduced as being "unstable" due to bipolar disorder. Nix explained that, within the series, there is "some awareness" that Polaris is the daughter of Magneto, leading to the question "does she accept the mantle of her birthright? Is it her job to be Magneto in his absence?" The character is depicted with green hair, as she is in the comics, but "subdued shades of green".
- Skyler Samuels as the Frost Sisters:
  Esme, Sophie, and Phoebe Frost are telepathic triplets with their own agenda, separate from those of the mutant underground, Sentinel Services, and Trask Industries. The effect of the three characters together was created with a mixture of effects: split-screening, green-screening, and face replacements over doubles when Samuels worked with two other actresses portraying the other sisters.
- Grace Byers as Reeva Payge:
  Leader of the "Inner Circle" with an elite band of followers who is introduced in the second season. She possesses destructive sonic powers.

== Episodes ==
Season	Episodes	Originally released	
Season	Episodes	First released	Last released
1	13	October 2, 2017	January 15, 2018
2	16	September 25, 2018	February 26, 2019

=== Season 1 (2017–18) ===
No. overall	No. in season	Title	Directed by	Written by	Original release date	Prod. code	U.S. viewers (millions)
1	1	"eXposed"	Bryan Singer	Matt Nix	October 2, 2017	1LAJ01	4.90
2	2	"rX"	Len Wiseman	Matt Nix	October 9, 2017	1LAJ02	3.79
3	3	"eXodus"	Scott Peters	Rashad Raisani	October 16, 2017	1LAJ03	3.46
4	4	"eXit strategy"	Karen Gaviola	Meredith Lavender & Marcie Ulin	October 23, 2017	1LAJ04	3.36
5	5	"boXed in"	Jeremiah Chechik	Jim Campolongo	October 30, 2017	1LAJ05	3.43
6	6	"got your siX"	Craig Siebels	Melinda Hsu Taylor	November 6, 2017	1LAJ06	3.17
7	7	"eXtreme measures"	Stephen Surjik	Michael Horowitz	November 13, 2017	1LAJ07	3.00
8	8	"threat of eXtinction"	Steven DePaul	Carly Soteras	November 20, 2017	1LAJ08	2.90
9	9	"outfoX"	Liz Friedlander	Brad Marques	December 4, 2017	1LAJ09	2.81
10	10	"eXploited"	Craig Siebels	Jim Campolongo	December 11, 2017	1LAJ10	2.78
11	11	"3 X 1"	David Straiton	Melinda Hsu Taylor	January 1, 2018	1LAJ11	2.54
12	12	"eXtraction"	Scott Peters	Michael Horowitz	January 15, 2018	1LAJ12	3.42
13	13	"X-roads"	Stephen Surjik	Matt Nix & Jim Garvey	January 15, 2018	1LAJ13	3.42

=== Season 2 (2018–19) ===
No. overall	No. in season	Title	Directed by	Written by	Original release date	Prod. code	U.S. viewers (millions)
14	1	"eMergence"	Robert Duncan McNeill	Matt Nix	September 25, 2018	2LAJ01	2.58
15	2	"unMoored"	Steven DePaul	Rashad Raisani	October 2, 2018	2LAJ02	2.25
16	3	"coMplications"	Michael Goi	Michael Horowitz	October 9, 2018	2LAJ03	2.06
17	4	"outMatched"	Deran Sarafian	Marta Gené Camps	October 16, 2018	2LAJ04	1.93
18	5	"afterMath"	Scott Peters	Melissa R. Byer & Treena Hancock	October 30, 2018	2LAJ05	1.96
19	6	"iMprint"	Michael Goi	Dawn Kamoche & Ariella Blejer	November 6, 2018	2LAJ06	2.31
20	7	"no Mercy"	Nina Lopez-Corrado	Brad Marques	November 13, 2018	2LAJ07	1.89
21	8	"the dreaM"	Robert Duncan McNeill	Carly Soteras	November 27, 2018	2LAJ08	2.17
22	9	"gaMe changer"	Allison Liddi-Brown	Melinda Hsu Taylor	December 4, 2018	2LAJ09	2.02
23	10	"eneMy of My eneMy"	Gregory Prange	Michael Horowitz	January 1, 2019	2LAJ10	1.73
24	11	"meMento"	Maggie Kiley	Jim Garvey	January 8, 2019	2LAJ11	2.07
25	12	"hoMe"	Dawn Wilkinson	Marta Gené Camps	January 15, 2019	2LAJ12	1.59
26	13	"teMpted"	Jonathan Frakes	Melissa R. Byer & Treena Hancock	January 22, 2019	2LAJ13	1.82
27	14	"calaMity"	Stephen Surjik	Jason Lazarcheck	February 12, 2019	2LAJ14	1.60
28	15	"Monsters"	Scott Peters	Carly Soteras	February 19, 2019	2LAJ15	1.61
29	16	"oMens"	Robert Duncan McNeill	Matt Nix	February 26, 2019	2LAJ16	1.61

== Production ==
=== Development ===
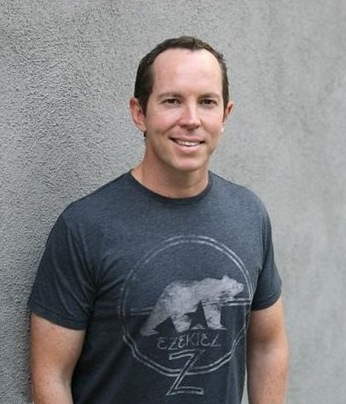
Matt Nix, a fan of the X-Men since he was young, serves as showrunner and writer on the series.

In July 2016, after a series based on the Hellfire Club, an X-Men comic property, did not move forward at Fox, the network made a put pilot commitment for a different X-Men based series. The new pilot, written by X-Men fan Matt Nix, was for an action-adventure series based on ordinary parents discovering their children's mutant abilities. Fox Entertainment President David Madden said that "developing a Marvel property has been a top priority for the network—and we are so pleased with how Matt Nix has led us into this thrilling universe." The series is produced by 20th Century Fox Television and Marvel Television, with 20th handling the physical production of the series, and Nix executive producing alongside X-Men film series producers Bryan Singer, Lauren Shuler Donner, and Simon Kinberg, and Marvel Television executives Jeph Loeb and Jim Chory.

Nix pitched the series to executives as "Running on Empty with mutants". He created an elaborate presentation using Prezi which included photos of actors that he had altered to look like mutants, and graphics to explain how the series would fit in with the X-Men films as well as the larger X-Men universe of the comics. The presentation was met with applause, according to Loeb. The biggest criticisms that Nix received about his pitch was that he wanted to include too much story in the pilot, with some of his initial ideas becoming the stories of several other episodes. Early versions of Nix's pilot script were received "enthusiastically" by Fox executives, and Fox chairman and CEO Gary Newman was expecting a final draft in early January 2017, with a pilot pickup within a few weeks of that. Newman noted that "development across the board this year is a little slower than usual", but the network hoped to begin airing the potential series during the 2017–18 television season.

Nix said that as a fan of the X-Men comics, "you don't want to be slavishly doing the same thing over and over again that everyone else has done, but at the same time, you're conscious that this is important, and that I owe something to my 10 year old self right now." Fox officially ordered the series to pilot, as "untitled Marvel action-adventure series", at the end of the month. Donner referred to the series as Gifted in March, which was clarified to be a temporary title for the series. On May 9, Fox ordered the show to series as The Gifted. The pilot had been called "one of the hottest pilots of the [2017] broadcast development season" by commentators. The first season consists of 13 episodes. In August, Len Wiseman joined as a director and executive producer for the season. That October, Nix said that he had planned "a couple of seasons, in broad strokes", and stated that he wanted "to be doing this show for a long time." Noting a growing trend in shorter, self-contained television seasons, Nix said that he wanted the show to feel more like a traditional, long-running story and so have each season end in a satisfying way that does not feel "close-ended". On January 4, 2018, the series was renewed for a 16-episode second season. Described as being designed for "limited runs", Fox had not been in a hurry to give the series an early renewal before then. On April 17, 2019, it was announced that the series had been cancelled by Fox.

=== Writing ===
Nix described the series as coming "at the world of mutants from the side"; the films and comics "have generally started with the X-Men and encountered the world outside" from their perspective, but the series looks to "take place inside the world of people who are [not] already X-Men and [do not yet] know that world." He said the show would tell a more intimate story than the films have done as "it also explores issues surrounding mutants and what that experience is in a way that's hard to do in a two-hour movie because [a movie] needs to move very quickly and needs to get to big action." These issues reflect modern, real-world problems such as police attempting to kill mutants just because they look different, or the government only taking issue with mutants if they reveal themselves in public. The series' mutant underground is inspired by the Underground Railroad. Madden said that the series also took inspiration from Heroes, particularly for its themes of family and "that loner, outcast, people with superpowers thing", though he felt The Gifted would take "that thread [in] a very different direction than anything that happened on Heroes."

Nix was particularly influenced by the comic District X which is "just about a district in New York. It's where the mutants are ... the show is not a procedural [like the comic] at all, but it was seeing mutants in society, dealing with crime, drugs, their relationships to each other. We didn't take any characters from it. It was one of my favorites." Elaborating on the series not being a procedural, Nix said that it would not have a "save the mutant of the week" formula, and would instead follow the ongoing story of the mutant underground as they both try to save other mutants and fight to protect themselves, though each episode still has a beginning, middle, and end. When approaching mutant abilities in the series, particularly for the Strucker children who are just discovering theirs, Nix wanted to avoid clearly defining exactly what those abilities are immediately since "when your powers manifest, they don't come with a label. It's not like somebody pops up and says, 'Hey! You can do this!' When we think about powers on the show, what's the organic relationship between this person as a living, breathing human being, and their power? The idea is that what your power is and what you can do is influenced by who you are as a character." The series explores how it feels for the characters to use their abilities, and shows those abilities evolving along with the characters.

=== Casting ===
By early January 2017, "exploratory casting" for the series had begun, with the process expected to "ramp up" after the official pilot pickup. The next month, Blair Redford was cast as a mutant leader; Jamie Chung was cast as popular mutant Clarice Fong / Blink; Stephen Moyer was cast as Reed Strucker, a father and the series' male lead; and Sean Teale was cast as Marcos Diaz / Eclipse, a mutant created for the series. In March, Natalie Alyn Lind joined as Lauren Strucker, one of the series' central children. She was followed by Amy Acker as Caitlin Strucker, a mother and the series' female lead; Emma Dumont as mutant Lorna Dane / Polaris; Percy Hynes White as Andy Strucker, another of the central children; and Coby Bell as the morally ambiguous Jace Turner. Acker auditioned alongside the already-cast Moyer; the pair did not meet the actors playing their children, Lind and White, until the table read of the pilot episode. With the series order in May, Redford's character was revealed to be John Proudstar / Thunderbird.

Moyer, Acker, Teale, Lind, White, Bell, Chung, Redford, and Dumont all return to star in the second season. By January 2018, Skyler Samuels, who recurred as the Stepford Cuckoos in the first season, was being looked at to be promoted to series regular for the second, and this move was confirmed in June, along with the announcement that Grace Byers would also be joining the series as a series regular, in the role of Reeva.

=== Filming ===
Production on the series' pilot took place through March and April 2017, in Dallas, Texas. The rest of the first season was not filmed in the city after a decision on tax rebates in the state to be made by the Texas Legislature took too long for the series' schedule, with production moving to Atlanta, Georgia. The series' setting was subsequently changed from Dallas to Atlanta, including a retroactive change to the pilot.

=== Music ===
It was revealed in October 2017, ahead of the series premiere, that John Ottman and David Buckley were composing the score for the show; Ottman previously scored several of the X-Men films for Singer, and he collaborated with Buckley on the score for the film The Nice Guys.

=== Shared universe connections ===
Donner explained in January 2017 that, unlike the previous X-Men television series Legion, this series "is much more a part of just the world in terms of there are mutants, mutants are hated ... you feel like you're here in the X-Men world". Despite this, the "cinematic universe will not worry about ... these TV worlds at all. [The films] will just continue in the way that they have been continuing". Nix added that the X-Men films "don't all line up perfectly. So it's not like I'm slavishly fitting myself into a particular slot [but] if you like that world and the world of the movies, there are definite nods to it, it definitely exists in the same general universe".

Nix wanted to avoid repeating the connection between Agents of S.H.I.E.L.D. and the films of the Marvel Cinematic Universe by having a more general relationship, with existing characters from the films appearing in different ways in the series such as the new adaptation of Sentinels, mutant-hunting robots that have appeared in several of the films. Moyer stated in June 2017 that The Gifted would be set many years after Legion, in which mutants "are still largely not understood", but before Logan, which sees the title character as one of the last mutants. He added, "we definitely slot into a timeline, but as of yet, we're not allied. I think they have given themselves a lot of leeway in order to be able to go places, but we've enough story within our universe to propel us forward without having to do that." The next month, Nix noted that the film X-Men: Days of Future Past established multiple, different timelines or "streams" in the X-Men universe, and that the series would take advantage of those to avoid the films and comics and instead do "our own thing". He explained that in the series' "stream", the X-Men have disappeared, which is "not just [because] they're too expensive for television" and something that the show would explore. He soon called this one of the central mysteries of the series, and revealed that it is due to a "bit of a 9/11 event, that caused enormous social upheaval and a lot of hatred towards mutants".

== Broadcast ==
The Gifted aired on Fox in the United States, with CTV acquiring the broadcast rights for Canada. The series launched in more than 183 countries on Fox, following its U.S. debut, using a "day-and-date launch" format. Both seasons of The Gifted were added to Disney+ on February 23, 2021.

== Reception ==
=== Ratings ===
Viewership and ratings per season of The Gifted
Season	Timeslot (ET)	Episodes	First aired		Last aired		TV season	Viewership rank	Avg. viewers (millions)	Avg. 18–49 rating
Season	Timeslot (ET)	Episodes	Date	Viewers (millions)	Date	Viewers (millions)	TV season	Viewership rank	Avg. viewers (millions)	Avg. 18–49 rating
1	Monday 9:00 pm	13	October 2, 2017	4.90	January 15, 2018	3.42	2017–18	99	4.97	1.7
2	Tuesday 8:00 pm (1–9); Tuesday 9:00 pm (10–16)	16	September 25, 2018	2.58	February 26, 2019	1.61	2018–19	132	3.32	1.1

The pilot's viewership was called a "solid start" to the series, and was noted to be higher than the season premiere of Lucifer in the same timeslot the year before, as well as the debut of the other new Marvel series of the season, Inhumans. By the series' second season renewal, it was considered to be a "solid ratings performer" for Fox, performing 18 percent better than the same timeslot the year before, and ranking the third best new drama series of the season.

=== Critical response ===
Critical response of The Gifted
Season	Rotten Tomatoes	Metacritic
1	76% (54 reviews)	63 (22 reviews)
2	83% (12 reviews)	—N/a

For the first season, the review aggregation website Rotten Tomatoes reported a 76% approval rating, with an average rating of 6.8/10 based on 54 reviews. The website's consensus states, "The Gifted's first season lays a solid foundation for an involving superhero drama that powers past the origin-story doldrums by focusing on grounded, topical stories over mindless action and special effects." Metacritic, which uses a weighted average, assigned a score of 63 out of 100 based on 22 reviews, indicating "generally favorable reviews".

For the second season, Rotten Tomatoes reported an 83% approval rating, with an average rating of 6.8/10 based on 12 reviews.

=== Nazi allusions ===
Discussing the series, Drew Koch of Bustle magazine noted that it explored themes such as the persecution of minority groups, sacrificing freedom for safety, and criticizing "big government". He highlighted the antagonistic agency Sentinel Services, guessing the initials "SS" were a reference to the Schutzstaffel, a paramilitary division of Nazi Germany. USA Today's Brian Truitt also noted this reference, and the character Polaris directly calling out the government agents as Nazis, along with the mutant underground being patterned after the Underground Railroad.

=== Accolades ===
Year	Award	Category	Nominee	Result	Ref.
2018	Young Artist Awards	Best Performance in a TV Series – Lead Teen Actor	Percy Hynes White	Nominated	
2018	Young Artist Awards	Best Performance in a TV Series – Supporting Teen Actress	Natalie Alyn Lind	Nominated	
