= X-Men (film series) =

American superhero film series

- Franchise logo from 2014 to 2020
- Based on: X-Men by: Stan Lee; Jack Kirby
- Distributed by: 20th Century Fox (Note: From X-Men to Dark Phoenix, the company was known as 20th Century Fox. After its rebranding in January 2020, The New Mutants would be the only film in the franchise released under the name 20th Century Studios.)
- Country: United States
- Language: English
- Budget: Total (13 films): $1.735 billion
- Box office: Total (13 films): $6.084 billion

X-Men is an American superhero film series based on the X-Men, a group of characters created by Stan Lee and Jack Kirby for comic books published by Marvel Comics. Encompassing thirteen live-action films and two live-action television series, it was produced by 20th Century Fox and Marvel Entertainment from 2000 to 2020.

In the 1980s, Marvel embarked on efforts to adapt the X-Men stories to film. After prolonged development, Fox purchased rights in 1993 and developed a trilogy comprising X-Men (2000), X2 (2003), and X-Men: The Last Stand (2006). A succession of films followed, expanding the fictional universe. Plans for a reboot led to the production of four prequel films chronicling the adventures of the X-Men as young people, from X-Men: First Class (2011) to Dark Phoenix (2019). From 2009 to 2020, Fox oversaw the creation of another six films as X-Men spinoffs, which feature Wolverine, Deadpool, and the New Mutants. The studio's television networks division produced Legion and The Gifted (both 2017–2019) tangential to the films. Fox controlled the production of X-Men films until its acquisition by The Walt Disney Company in 2019, effectively terminating all planned adaptations from the studio.

Critical opinion about X-Men films differ significantly. Most average moderately positive scores on Metacritic and Rotten Tomatoes, though there is a wide disparity between the best-reviewed entries, X-Men: Days of Future Past (2014) and Logan (2017), and the worst, X-Men Origins: Wolverine (2009), Dark Phoenix, and The New Mutants (2020). At the box office, the films are generally successful and constitute one of the highest-grossing film franchises of all time, grossing over $6 billion worldwide.

== Films ==
In the 1980s, Marvel Comics embarked on efforts to develop a theatrical film about the X-Men, a superhero team of mutants created by Stan Lee and Jack Kirby in 1963, whose stories were the company's most popular to that point. Marvel optioned the film rights to create a live-action adaptation with the Toronto-based animation studio Nelvana. Chris Claremont outlined two proposals between 1982 and 1983; his first outline gave particular focus to Kitty Pryde, while the second pitted the X-Men against the Brotherhood of Mutants within the context of the Cold War. Thereafter, Claremont left to concentrate on other endeavors. Around the time Nelvana finalized a distribution agreement with Orion Pictures, Gerry Conway and Roy Thomas were hired to prepare a treatment. The men wrote several treatments, owing to disputes with the Orion producers over the creative direction, triggering a prolonged development phase. Each draft increasingly deviated from the comics. By 1985, Orion was in financial disarray after all but two films failed to yield profits, unravelling the project's development.

Toward the end of the decade, Marvel entered discussions with James Cameron to produce an X-Men film through a venture with his production company Lightstorm Entertainment. Claremont and Lee pitched the idea to Lightstorm producers, but the negotiations collapsed as Cameron had obligations to another Marvel property, Spider-Man, with Carolco Pictures at the time. Marvel spent another nine months soliciting bids for the sale of the X-Men film rights, ending when they arranged 20th Century Fox to purchase said rights for $2.6 million in June 1993. The success of X-Men: The Animated Series (1992–1997) had piqued Hollywood interest in a feature film.

X-Men films
Film	U.S. release date	Directed by	Screenplay by	Story by	Produced by
X-Men original trilogy
X-Men	July 14, 2000	Bryan Singer	David Hayter	Tom DeSanto & Bryan Singer	Lauren Shuler Donner & Ralph Winter
X2	May 2, 2003	Bryan Singer	Michael Dougherty, Dan Harris & David Hayter	Zak Penn, David Hayter & Bryan Singer	Lauren Shuler Donner & Ralph Winter
X-Men: The Last Stand	May 26, 2006	Brett Ratner	Simon Kinberg & Zak Penn	Simon Kinberg & Zak Penn	Lauren Shuler Donner, Ralph Winter & Avi Arad
X-Men prequel films
X-Men: First Class	June 3, 2011	Matthew Vaughn	Ashley Edward Miller, Zack Stentz, Jane Goldman & Matthew Vaughn	Sheldon Turner & Bryan Singer	Lauren Shuler Donner, Bryan Singer, Simon Kinberg & Gregory Goodman
X-Men: Days of Future Past	May 23, 2014	Bryan Singer	Simon Kinberg	Jane Goldman, Simon Kinberg & Matthew Vaughn	Lauren Shuler Donner, Bryan Singer, Simon Kinberg & Hutch Parker
X-Men: Apocalypse	May 27, 2016	Bryan Singer	Simon Kinberg	Bryan Singer, Simon Kinberg, Michael Dougherty & Dan Harris	Lauren Shuler Donner, Bryan Singer, Simon Kinberg & Hutch Parker
Dark Phoenix	June 7, 2019	Simon Kinberg	Simon Kinberg	Simon Kinberg	Lauren Shuler Donner, Simon Kinberg, Hutch Parker & Todd Hallowell
Wolverine trilogy
X-Men Origins: Wolverine	May 1, 2009	Gavin Hood	David Benioff & Skip Woods	David Benioff & Skip Woods	Lauren Shuler Donner, Ralph Winter, Hugh Jackman & John Palermo
The Wolverine	July 26, 2013	James Mangold	Mark Bomback & Scott Frank	Mark Bomback & Scott Frank	Lauren Shuler Donner & Hutch Parker
Logan	March 3, 2017	James Mangold	Scott Frank, James Mangold & Michael Green	James Mangold	Lauren Shuler Donner, Simon Kinberg & Hutch Parker
Deadpool films
Deadpool	February 12, 2016	Tim Miller	Rhett Reese & Paul Wernick	Rhett Reese & Paul Wernick	Lauren Shuler Donner, Simon Kinberg & Ryan Reynolds
Deadpool 2	May 18, 2018	David Leitch	Rhett Reese, Paul Wernick & Ryan Reynolds	Rhett Reese, Paul Wernick & Ryan Reynolds	Lauren Shuler Donner, Simon Kinberg & Ryan Reynolds
Spin-off
The New Mutants	August 28, 2020	Josh Boone	Josh Boone & Knate Lee	Josh Boone & Knate Lee	Simon Kinberg, Karen Rosenfelt & Lauren Shuler Donner

=== Original trilogy ===
==== X-Men (2000) ====
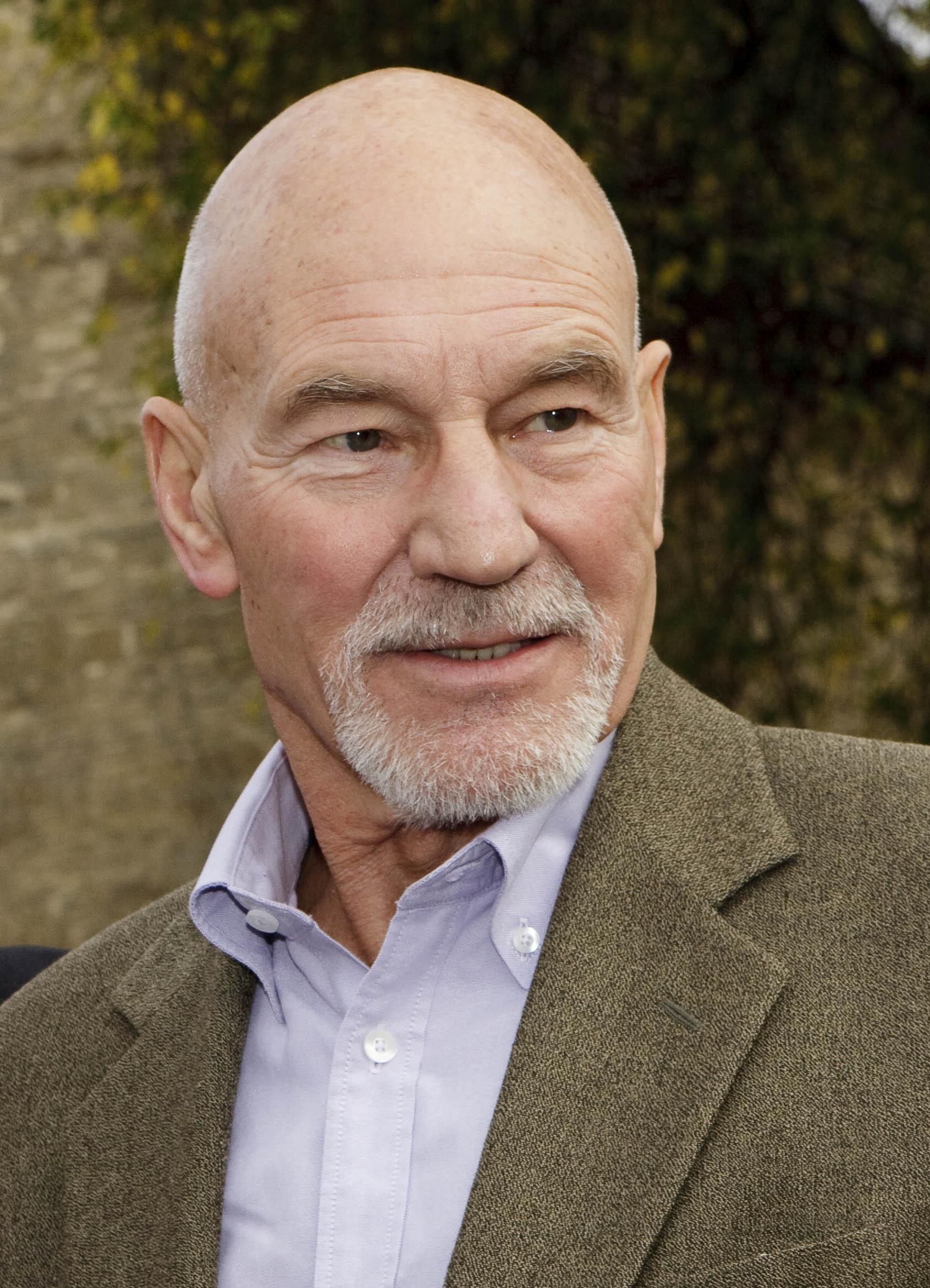
Patrick Stewart in 2009

Fox began work on X-Men with producer Lauren Shuler Donner in 1994. The studio approached Bryan Singer early in the film's development and, by July 1996, appointed him as director. Singer was apprehensive about directing but was convinced by his producer Tom DeSanto, an avid fan of the comics. Singer was drawn to the X-Men stories because of their portrayal of the mutants' oppression. Fox spent several years in protracted development over the creative direction, hiring a number of writers with the instruction to preserve the overtly political subtext espoused by the comics. Filmmakers also wanted changes in the script to prioritize action scenes that could not be easily altered without raising the budget, which they were unwilling to do. David Hayter received the sole screenwriting credit.

X-Men's ensemble cast comprises twelve actors, including Hugh Jackman, Patrick Stewart, Ian McKellen, Halle Berry, Anna Paquin, Famke Janssen, and James Marsden. The then-little known Jackman was not Fox's initial casting choice for Wolverine; the studio contracted Dougray Scott in that role until an unforeseen scheduling conflict pertaining to delays in the production of Mission: Impossible 2 (2000) forced the actor to drop out. X-Men follows Wolverine and Rogue's (Paquin) entry into a global conflict between mutant factions led by Charles Xavier (Stewart) and Magneto, supervillain persona of Erik Lehnsherr (McKellen). The film, shot from September 1999 to March 2000 in Toronto, was released in July 2000 and became a surprise success.

==== X2 (2003) ====
A sequel to X-Men was in development by April 2001. Hayter and Zak Penn produced an early script combining elements of drafts they had written independently. Fox recruited Michael Dougherty and Dan Harris to make revisions to this screenplay; they submitted hundreds of drafts to Singer. The X2 story draws from Claremont's graphic novel X-Men: God Loves, Man Kills (1982). Shooting lasted five months in Vancouver, from June to November 2002. X2 was a trouble-ridden production, and problems were attributed to Singer's escalating dependence on drugs. A confrontation arose when DeSanto urged a pause on filming in response to witnessing Singer inebriated, then another once Fox resumed production the following day, in which the actors threatened to quit. X2 debuted to mostly positive reviews in May 2003 and grossed $407 million at the box office, finishing ninth among the year's highest-grossing films.

==== X-Men: The Last Stand (2006) ====
Singer was preparing a film treatment for a third film, X-Men: The Last Stand, before resigning to direct Superman Returns (2006) in July 2004. Fox proceeded with the release of X-Men: The Last Stand without a director until they offered the role to Matthew Vaughn, having been impressed with his work in the crime thriller Layer Cake (2004). Vaughn eventually dropped out and was replaced by Brett Ratner. The screenplay was written by Vaughn, Penn, and Simon Kinberg, though only the latter two received credit for their contributions. They drew inspiration from the multi-issue storylines "The Dark Phoenix Saga" and "Gifted" for the film plot. After a five month filming period, Fox released X-Men: The Last Stand in May 2006. It drew mixed reviews in the media and was 2006's seventh highest-grossing film.

=== Prequel films ===
==== X-Men: First Class (2011) ====
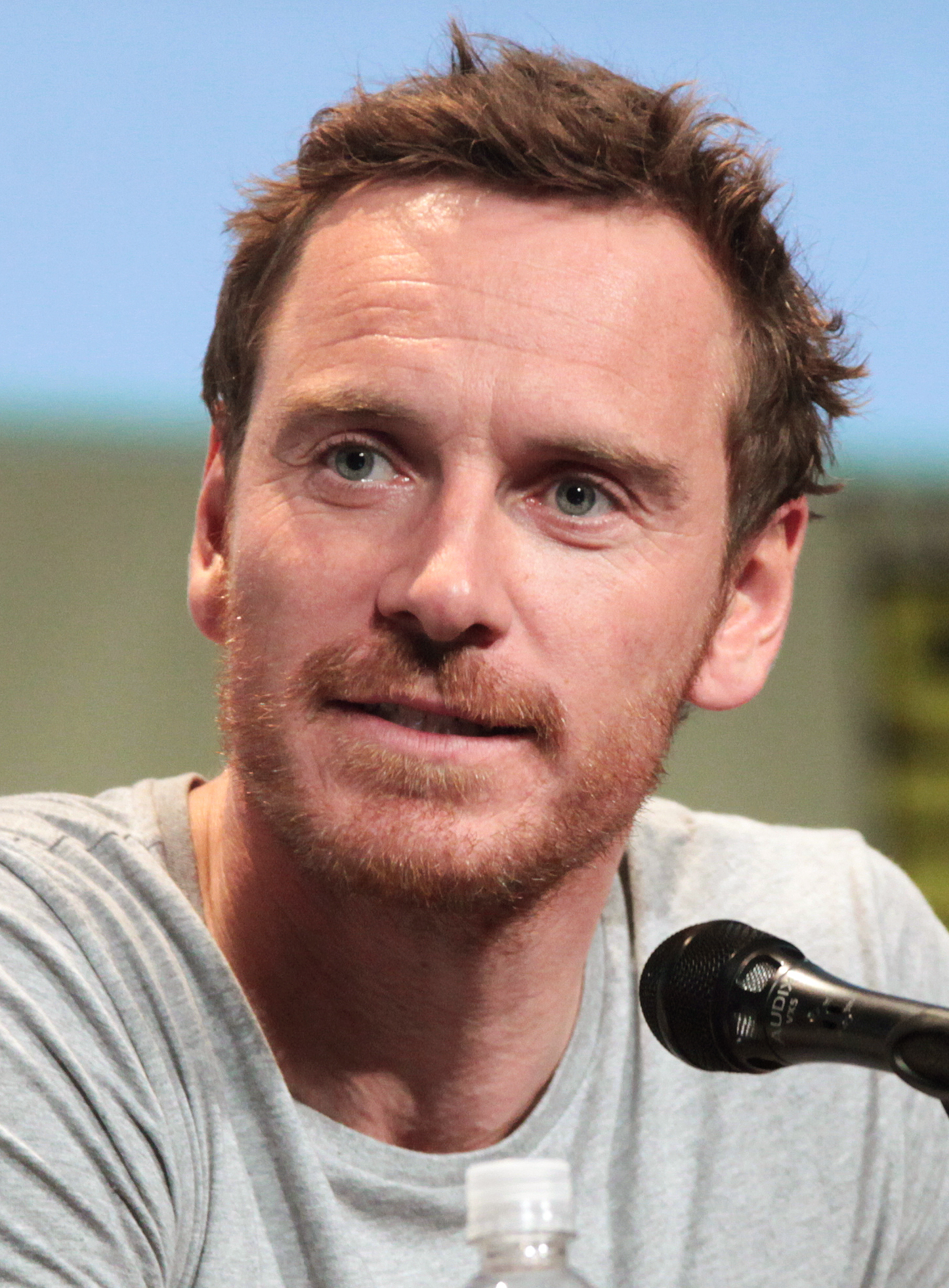
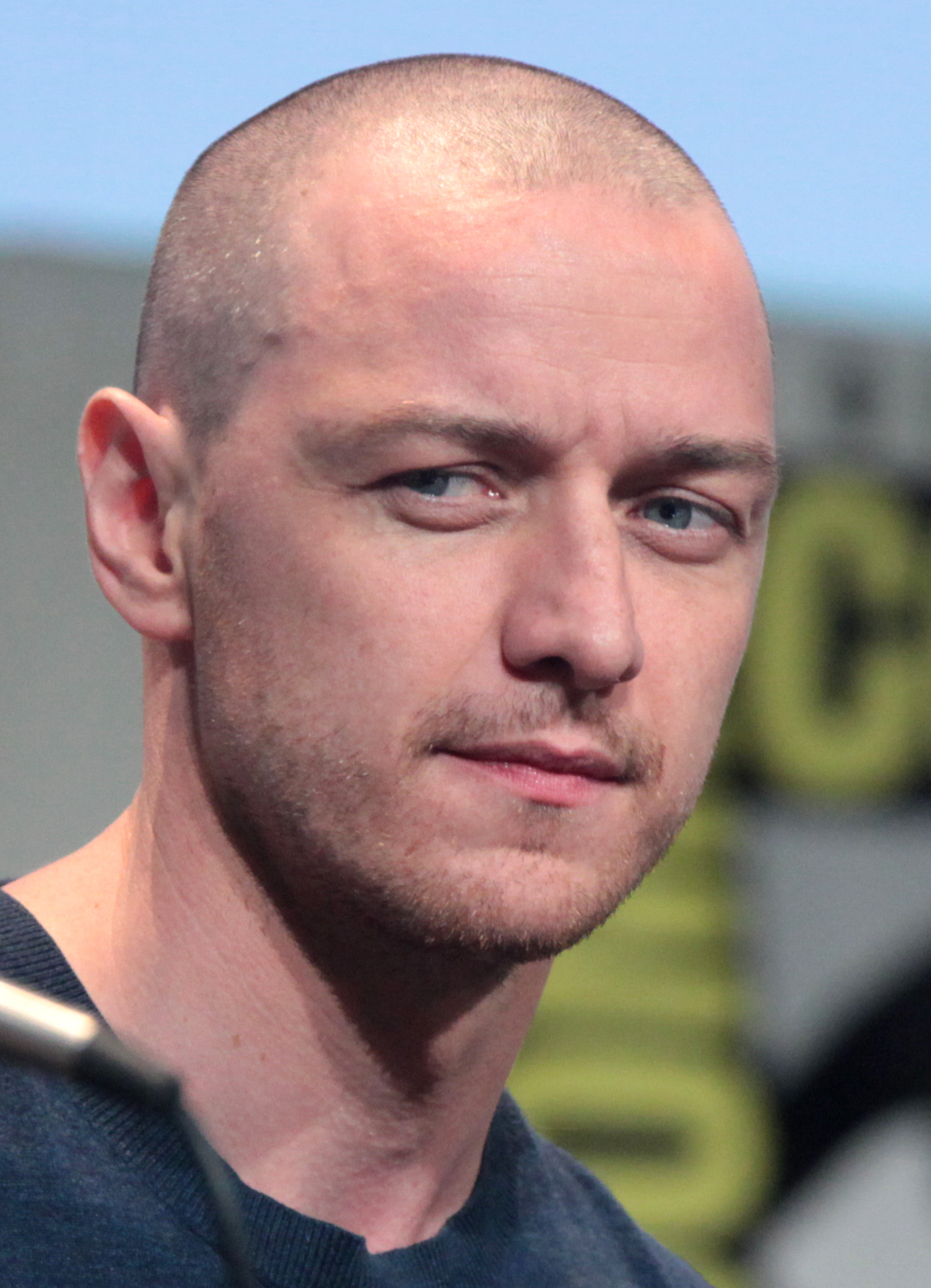
Michael Fassbender (left) and James McAvoy (right) in 2016

The idea of a spinoff chronicling the adventures of the X-Men as young people was first articulated by Donner in 2003. Kinberg pitched a film version of the comic book series X-Men: First Class, which depicts the characters as teenagers. Fox envisioned X-Men: First Class as the first of a trilogy of films. Its main story dwells on Xavier (James McAvoy) and Lehnsherr's (Michael Fassbender) relationship as twenty-somethings and the point at which their friendship dissolves.

The script went through multiple revisions from a succession of writers and incorporated ideas gleaned from an abandoned Magneto spinoff written by Sheldon Turner under David Goyer's direction, igniting a dispute over the distribution of screenwriting credits. In response, a Writers Guild of America (WGA) arbitration credited Turner and Singer, who had supervised an early script by Jamie Moss, as the story's creators. The WGA upheld their ruling when Moss appealed. Singer remained involved in X-Men: First Class as a producer. Fox hired Vaughn as the film's director in May 2010. McAvoy and Fassbender lead a fourteen-actor ensemble cast featuring, among others, Jennifer Lawrence, Kevin Bacon, Rose Byrne, January Jones, and Nicholas Hoult. The filmmakers shot X-Men: First Class into early 2011. Despite a poor box office prognosis, the film opened to positive reviews in June 2011, finishing the theatrical run with $353 million.

==== X-Men: Days of Future Past (2014) ====
Donner confirmed plans for a sequel, X-Men: Days of Future Past, in a March 2011 cover story published by Empire. Kinberg returned and became the franchise's primary writer. The producers originally hired Vaughn to direct; Singer went into the project as Vaughn's replacement after he left to focus on the creation of Kingsman: The Secret Service (2014). Kinberg's script borrows from the "Days of Future Past" storyline though features Wolverine time traveling instead of Kitty Pryde (Elliot Page). The filmmakers also used time travel to alter the continuity of events established in X-Men: The Last Stand. Fox gave the production a $205 million budget, spending mid-2013 filming X-Men: Days of Future Past in Montreal, with reshoots commencing toward the end of the year. Filming was affected by Singer's frequent absences, forcing Kinberg to manage daily operations with Hutch Parker, Newton Thomas Sigel, and John Ottman. The theatrical rollout followed in May 2014. X-Men: Days of Future Past emerged as the sixth highest-grossing film of 2014 with $746 million. At the 87th Academy Awards, the film was nominated for Best Visual Effects.

==== X-Men: Apocalypse (2016) ====
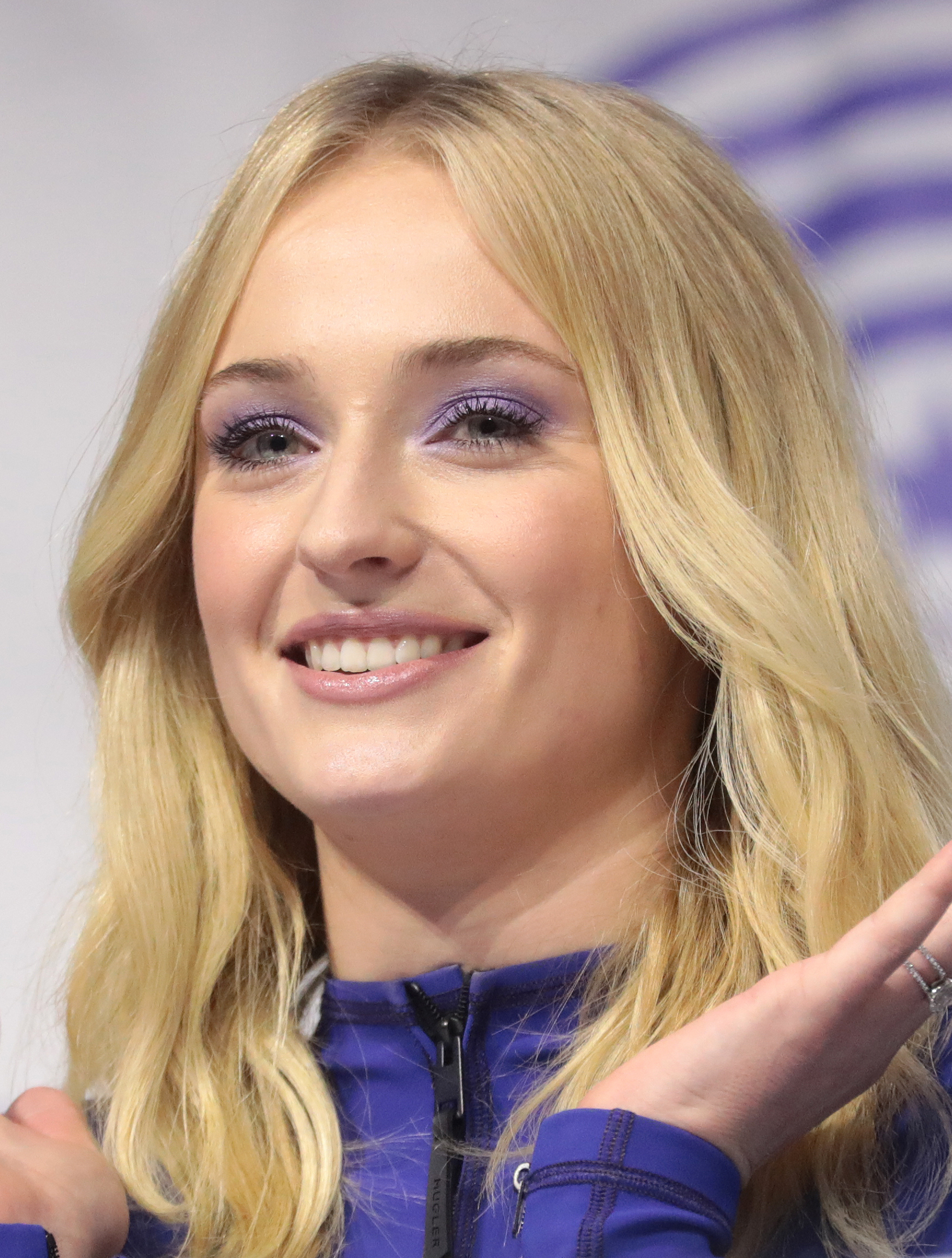
Sophie Turner in 2019

Preparation for the follow-up film, titled X-Men: Apocalypse, began months before X-Men: Days of Future Past's 2014 release. Singer was rehired as director, while Fox assigned the responsibility for scriptwriting to Kinberg, Dougherty, and Harris. For X-Men: Apocalypse, the filmmakers conceived an X-Men origin story inspired by the 1988 story arc "The Fall of the Mutants", introducing Jean Grey (Sophie Turner), Cyclops (Tye Sheridan), Storm (Alexandra Shipp), and Apocalypse (Oscar Isaac). As well, they wanted resolution for narratives about Xavier, Lehnsherr, Mystique (Lawrence), and Beast (Hoult) that began in X-Men: First Class. Principal photography lasted from April to August 2015, and X-Men: Apocalypse opened in May 2016 to mixed reviews and a diminished box office take of $543.9 million. After the film's release, Singer came under public scrutiny from reports of his conduct as early as 1997, including allegations of rape.

==== Dark Phoenix (2019) ====
Producers had been contemplating a film adapting "The Dark Phoenix Saga" as early as 2003. Largely based on Fox's wishes, they developed the first film version of the story as a subplot for X-Men: The Last Stand, but this treatment was poorly received. Kinberg started writing a script for Dark Phoenix in 2016. Fox then ousted Singer for Kinberg as director, news of which was confirmed in the media in June 2017. The script portrays an origin story detailing Jean Grey's transformation into the Phoenix, with emphasis on her mental health struggles. Dark Phoenix had been imagined as a two-part film; Fox insisted on a single film near the end of pre-production. Shooting occurred from June to October 2017, but reshoots extended the production schedule by a year because the actors had other work commitments. Thus, the studio for a time postponed the exhibition schedule before releasing the film in June 2019. Dark Phoenix was ridiculed by critics and brought Fox a $133 million profit loss, becoming one of the biggest box-office bombs of all time.

=== Wolverine trilogy ===
==== X-Men Origins: Wolverine (2009) ====
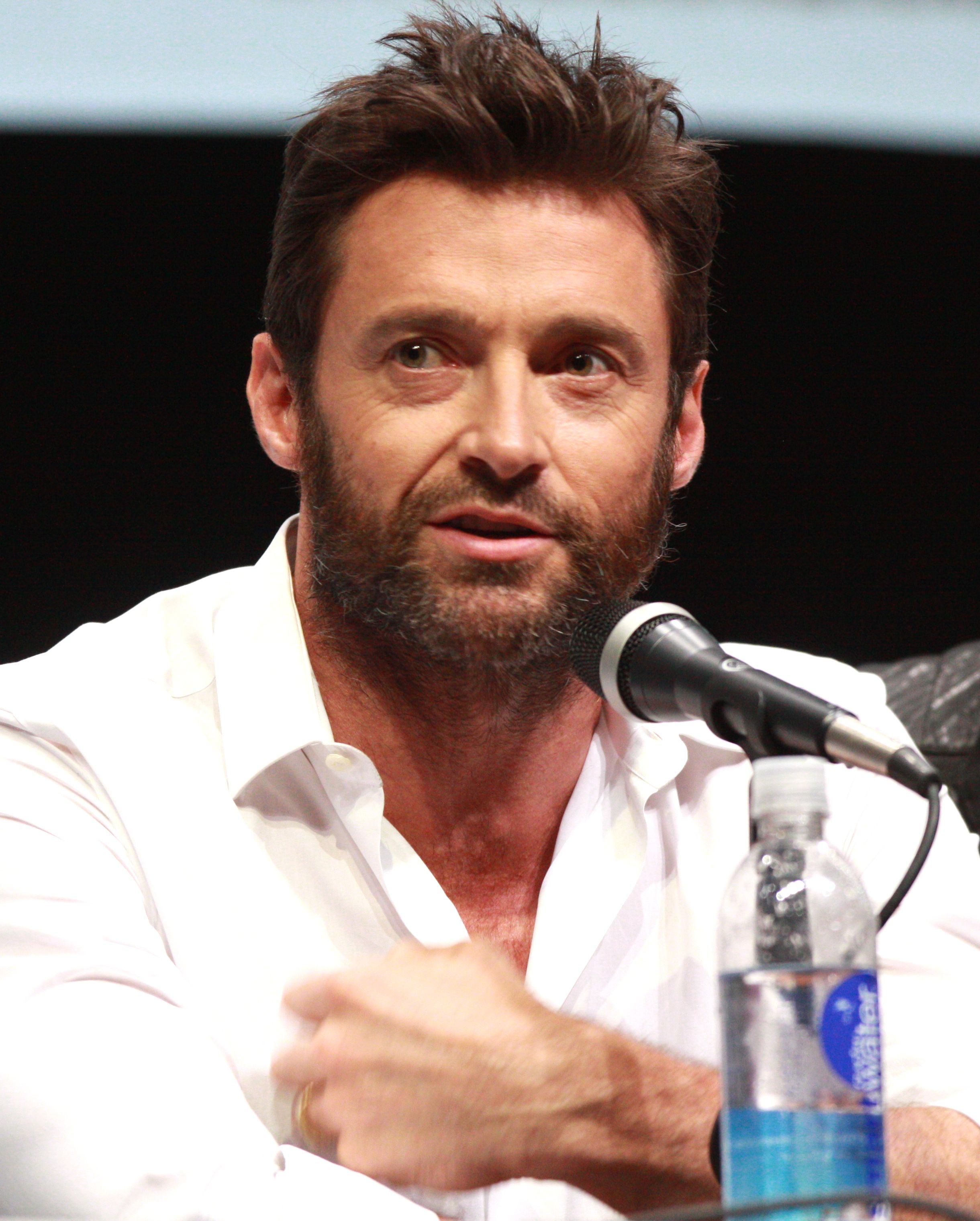
Hugh Jackman in 2013

By October 2004, Fox initiated plans for a spinoff exploring Wolverine's origins. The studio hired David Benioff to write the X-Men Origins: Wolverine screenplay, which assembled from a rewrite by Skip Woods and uncredited contributions from David Ayer, James Vanderbilt, and Scott Silver. Several filmmakers were considered to direct, which Fox eventually assigned to Gavin Hood. Jackman starred and co-produced Wolverine through his production company Seed Productions, earning $20 million. The film was shot in New Zealand and Australia beginning in January 2008 and finished in May. Critics expressed little enthusiasm upon the film's general release in May 2009 but, having grossed $373 million, Wolverine proved just successful enough to turn a profit.

==== The Wolverine (2013) ====
A sequel, The Wolverine, was commissioned immediately after X-Men Origins: Wolverine's release. Written by Scott Frank and Mark Bomback, the film sees Wolverine dispatched to Japan to protect Mariko Yashida (Tao Okamoto), heiress of Yashida Industries, from yakuza assassins deployed by her father Shingen (Hiroyuki Sanada), in a story based on the four-issue miniseries by Claremont and Frank Miller, Wolverine (1982). Fox chose James Mangold as The Wolverine's director from a shortlist of eight filmmakers. Production took place in Australia from August to November 2012, and following its July 2013 debut, the Rotten Tomatoes consensus noted that the film "is one superhero movie that manages to stay true to the comics while keeping casual viewers entertained". The Wolverine ended the theatrical run grossing $414 million.

==== Logan (2017) ====
Logan concludes the Wolverine trilogy and was promoted as Jackman's final performance as Wolverine. Mangold once more was tasked with directing. He additionally shares screenwriting credit with Frank and Michael Green, their script depicting a plot derivative of the multi-issue story arc "Old Man Logan", in which an aged Wolverine defends his mutant daughter Laura (Dafne Keen) from a team of cyborg assassins led by Donald Pierce (Boyd Holbrook). Mangold cited Western film, Little Miss Sunshine (2006), and the work of Scottish filmmaker Alexander Mackendrick as significant influences on Logan's creative direction. Fox spent three months on principal photography and released the film to critical acclaim in March 2017. Logan grossed $619.2 million and became the first superhero film to receive an Academy Award nomination for Best Adapted Screenplay.

=== Deadpool films ===
==== Deadpool (2016) ====
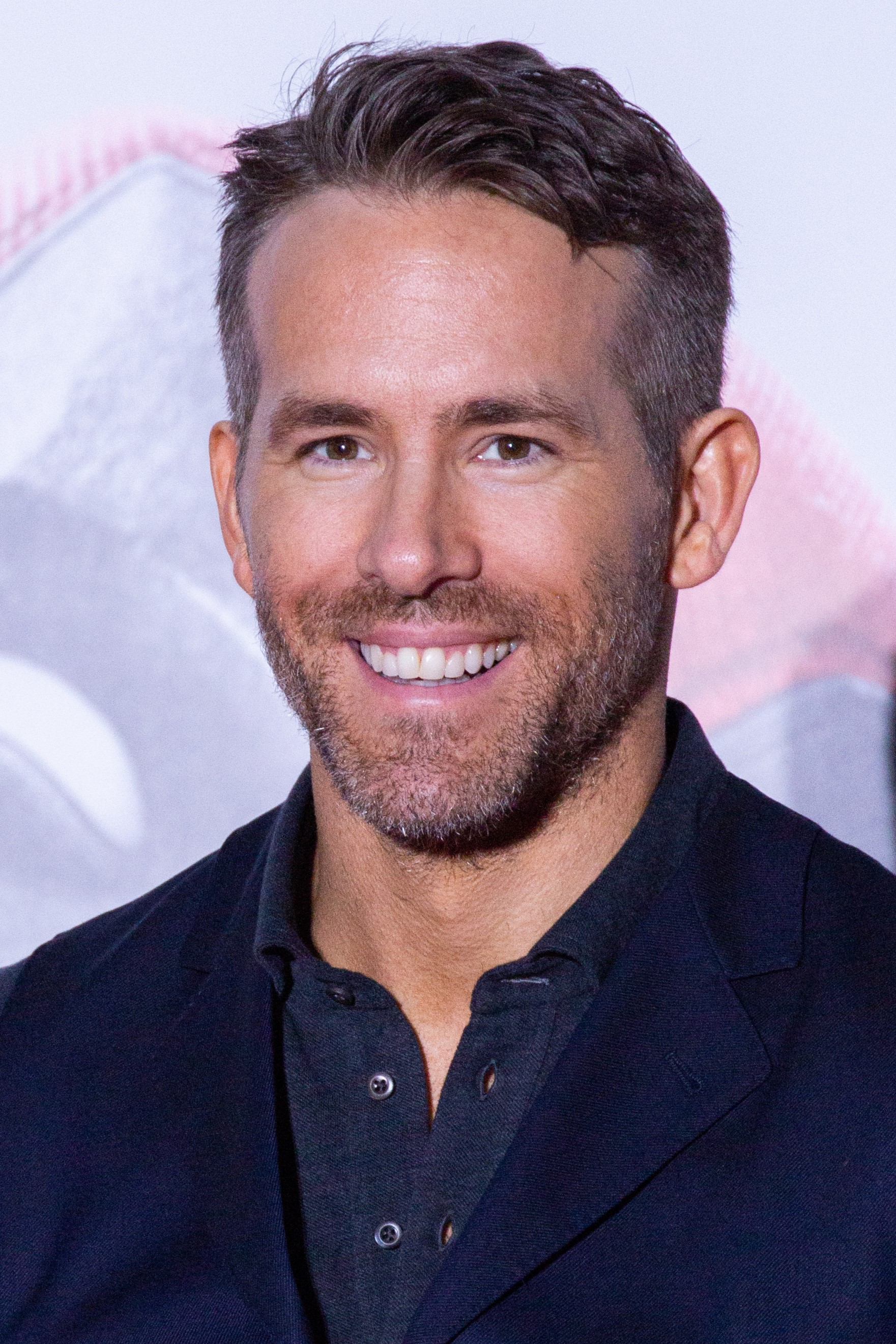
Ryan Reynolds in 2018

Deadpool originated from a joint venture between Marvel and Artisan Entertainment to adapt no fewer than fifteen Marvel superheroes to film in March 2000. The partnership continued into Lionsgate's takeover of Artisan in 2003, but Lionsgate showed little interest in the contingent of characters they inherited and the film rights soon reverted to Marvel. A Deadpool film remained tentatively planned until Fox approved development in May 2009, allocating $50–59 million for the budget. It is visual effects specialist Tim Miller's first feature as director, and follows a script written by Rhett Reese and Paul Wernick. Ryan Reynolds stars as Deadpool, reprising the role from Wolverine. Filming began in March 2015 and ended in two months. Released in February 2016, Deadpool proved popular critically and commercially, grossing an estimated $783 million, at one point the highest-grossing R-rated film of all time.

==== Deadpool 2 (2018) ====
After months of speculation, Fox ordered Deadpool 2 while Deadpool ran in theaters in February 2016. Reese and Wernick again worked as the screenwriters, developing the script alongside Reynolds and Drew Goddard as an advisor. However, the studio hired a new director, David Leitch, to replace Miller after he dropped out over creative differences with Reynolds. In the film, Deadpool forms the X-Force to save an orphaned mutant (Julian Dennison) from being captured by Cable (Josh Brolin). Filming for Deadpool 2 began in June 2017 and ran until that October. Released in May 2018, the film repeated the success of Deadpool, becoming the year's ninth highest-grossing film with $785.9 million.

=== Spin-off ===
==== The New Mutants (2020) ====
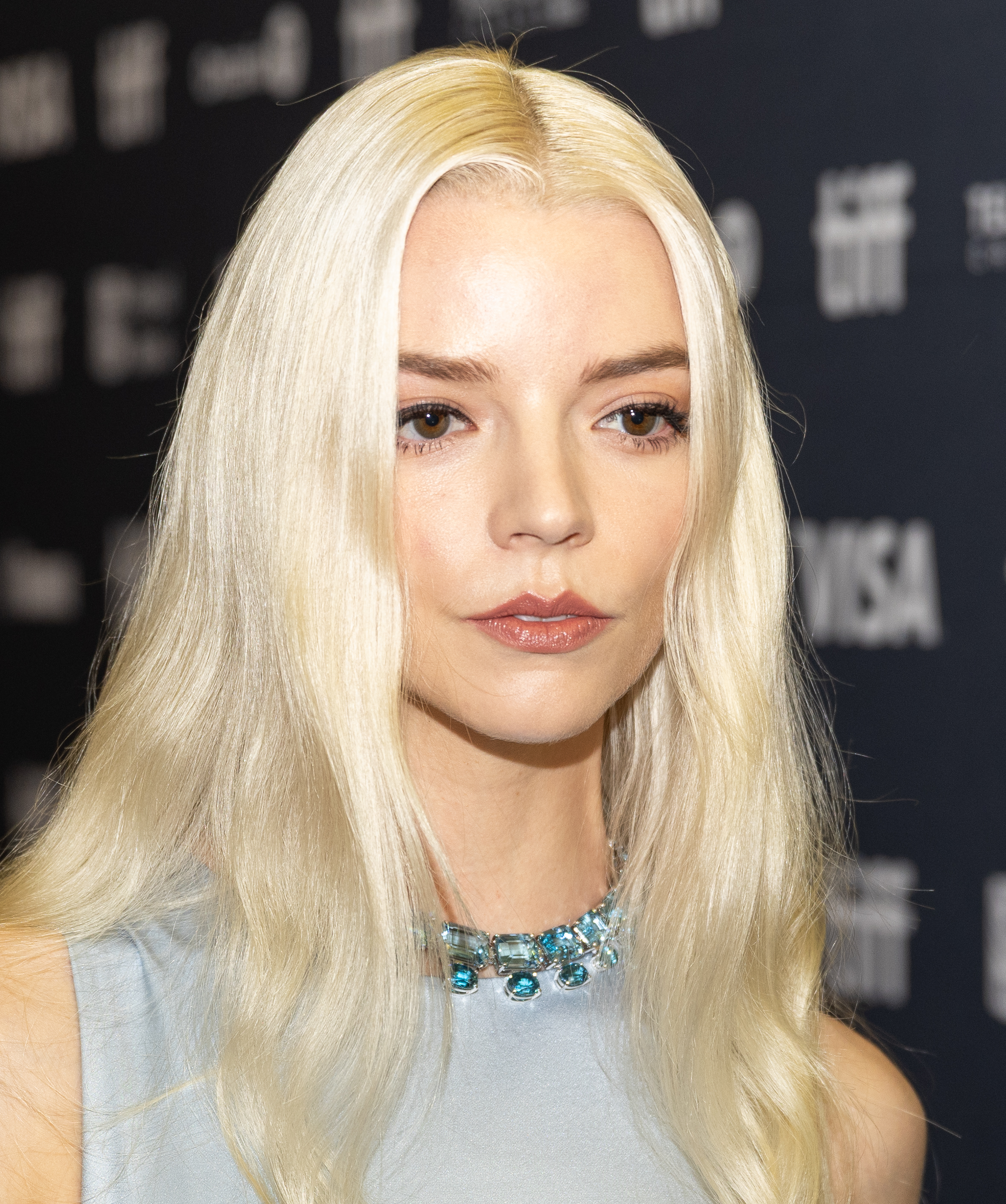
Anya Taylor-Joy in 2025

Fox's final X-Men film, The New Mutants, had been in the works since 2009. Josh Boone was chosen to direct and shares scriptwriting credit with his childhood friend Knate Lee. The duo produced a comic book based on "The Demon Bear Saga" of The New Mutants (1984) to pitch to Kinberg, which outlined a trilogy of films. One goal the filmmakers had was to create a superhero film grounded in horror.

Boone found himself at odds with Fox producers over the film's artistic direction; they disliked the script's comedy and treatment of X-Men characters. The studio mandated multiple rewrites to bring the screenplay closer to their vision, which Boone rejected. The New Mutants features Blu Hunt, Anya Taylor-Joy, Charlie Heaton, Maisie Williams, and Henry Zaga as teenage mutants plotting their escape from captivity in a facility run by Cecilia Reyes (Alice Braga). It was shot over the summer of 2017, but the production was complicated by dissatisfaction with the film's final cut and Fox's acquisition by The Walt Disney Company. Delayed three times, The New Mutants was unsuccessful upon its release in August 2020.

== Television ==
Series	Season	Episodes	Originally released			Showrunner
Series	Season	Episodes	First released	Last released	Network	Showrunner
Legion	1	8	February 8, 2017	March 29, 2017	FX	Noah Hawley
Legion	2	11	April 3, 2018	June 12, 2018	FX	Noah Hawley
Legion	3	8	June 24, 2019	August 12, 2019	FX	Noah Hawley
The Gifted	1	13	October 2, 2017	January 15, 2018	Fox	Matt Nix
The Gifted	2	16	September 25, 2018	February 26, 2019	Fox	Matt Nix

=== Legion (2017–2019) ===
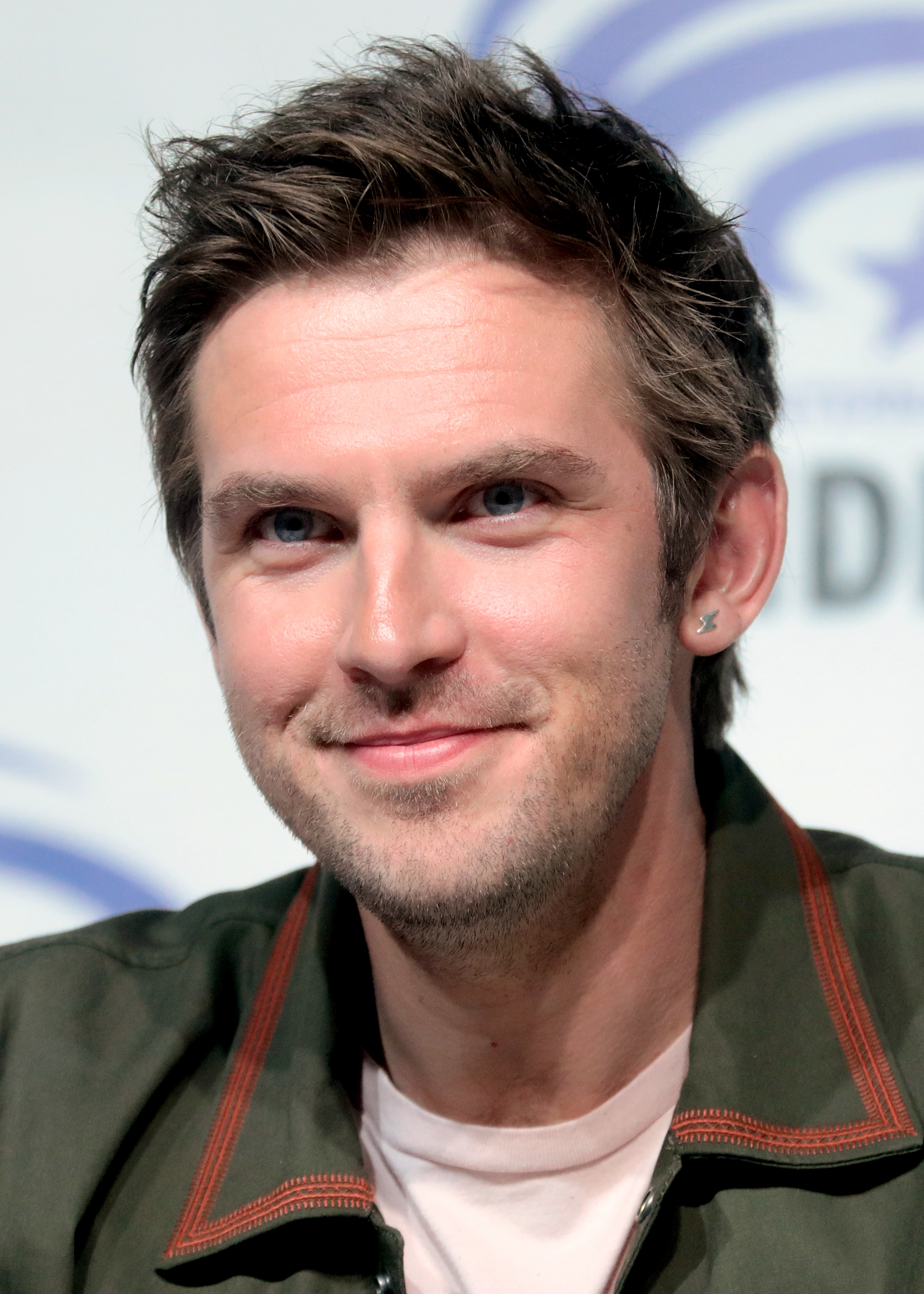
Dan Stevens in 2019

Following the premiere of FX's Fargo in 2014, Noah Hawley deliberated ideas on an X-Men TV adaptation with FX producers. Two concepts were pitched that Hawley rejected, including a show based on the Hellfire Club. Afterwards, he turned to Kinberg for guidance and the two discussed David Haller, the son of Xavier with schizophrenia whose hallucinations are an expression of a superpower. Hawley said he found this quality fascinating and sought to convey the story using Haller's condition to play on perspective. Legion is situated in a timeline tangential to the X-Men films.

Legion consists of 27 episodes split between three seasons, broadcast from 2017 to 2019. The show's first season sees Haller honing his newfound powers after Sydney Barrett (Rachel Keller) convinces him that he is in fact lucid. In season two, Haller embarks on a quest to vanquish Amahl Farouk / Shadow King (Navid Negahban) with a government agency of mutants known as Division Three, culminating in him sexually assaulting Barrett. He becomes a hippie cult leader in hiding in the show's final season, seeking to exploit the time traveling abilities of a mutant named Switch (Lauren Tsai) to undo his misdeeds. Dan Stevens portrays Haller, leading a starring cast featuring Keller, Aubrey Plaza, Jean Smart, Jeremie Harris, Amber Midthunder, Katie Aselton, Bill Irwin, Jemaine Clement, and Hamish Linklater. Negahban was promoted to the main cast in season two, likewise Tsai for season three. Among the actors employed in recurring roles were Harry Lloyd, Stephanie Corneliussen, and Jon Hamm.

=== The Gifted (2017–2019) ===
Around the same time, The Gifted, an X-Men series about a family fleeing state persecution after the parents discover their children have mutant powers, ran on Fox for two seasons. A 20th Television and Marvel Television co-production, the show was conceived by Matt Nix; he pitched The Gifted as "Running on Empty with mutants". Nix chose an ordinary family as the central focus believing it was more appropriate for television than conventional superheroes. A cast of nine actors received top billing: Stephen Moyer, Amy Acker, Sean Teale, Natalie Alyn Lind, Percy Hynes White, Jamie Chung, Coby Bell, Blair Redford, and Emma Dumont. The Gifted, like Legion, inhabits the same fictional universe as the X-Men films in a separate timeline.

The show's 13-episode first season debuted on October 2, 2017. In January 2018, Fox renewed The Gifted for a second season, which aired to significantly lower ratings than season one. The series was cancelled in April 2019.

== Cancellation ==
Fox began merger talks with Disney in late 2017. Executives discussed an acquisition amid the launch of Disney's streaming service, Disney+, and believed such would enhance its competitiveness. This resulted in a brief bidding war with Comcast Corporation in June 2018, ending when Disney increased its offer to $71.3 billion. The acquisition was finalized on March 20, 2019, which transferred the film rights to the X-Men and associated characters to Disney and subsidiary Marvel Studios. Thus, all planned adaptations from Fox were effectively cancelled. X-Men films under Disney ownership will be released as part of the Marvel Cinematic Universe (MCU). Numerous cast members from Fox's X-Men films have reprised their roles in MCU productions that are part of its Multiverse Saga, ahead of the introduction of a rebooted X-Men cast for the MCU's untitled X-Men film (2028).

== Timeline ==
Events in the main continuity X-Men films are traditionally placed in two timelines. The original timeline starts with X-Men Origins: Wolverine, continuing through X-Men: First Class, X-Men, X2, X-Men: The Last Stand, The Wolverine, and up to X-Men: Days of Future Past. The settings are mostly contemporaneous save for X-Men Origins: Wolverine (set between 1845 and 1979), X-Men: First Class (1962), and X-Men: Days of Future Past (partially 2023). From X-Men: Days of Future Past, a new timeline emerges when Wolverine is sent on a mission to prevent the assassination of Bolivar Trask in 1973, which retroactively alters all established film continuity. This second timeline includes X-Men: Apocalypse and Dark Phoenix, spanning from 1983 to 1992.

However, continuity in the films is not uniform and has been subjected to perceived errors related to storytelling and characters. (Note: Attributed to multiple sources:) The Deadpool films, for example, feature a distinct interpretation of Deadpool than X-Men Origins: Wolverine despite being played by the same actor, though cameos from the young X-Men in Deadpool 2 attempt to convey these films are also part of the new timeline. Jackman stated that Logan transpires in an alternate timeline, contradicting Mangold's claim that it does in fact occur in tandem with the core films. The New Mutants contains some references to the X-Men though bears no obvious relationship to events in the main continuity films. Nevertheless, Marvel designated the X-Men universe as Earth-10005 within the context of their multiverse.

== Recurring characters ==
List indicators

This section includes characters who have appeared in two or more installments in the series.

- An empty grey cell indicates the character was not in the film.
- ^{C} indicates a cameo role.
- ^{E} indicates an appearance not included in the theatrical cut.
- ^{O} indicates an older version of the character.
- ^{Y} indicates a younger version of the character.

Character	X-Men original trilogy	Wolverine trilogy	X-Men prequel films	Deadpool Deadpool 2	Legion	The Gifted	The New Mutants
John Allerdyce Pyro	Alexander Burton^{C} Aaron Stanford						
Elizabeth "Betsy" Braddock Psylocke	Meiling Melançon		Olivia Munn				
Caliban		Stephen Merchant	Tómas Lemarquis				
Roberto "Bobby" da Costa Sunspot			Adan Canto				Henry Zaga
Victor Creed Sabretooth	Tyler Mane	Liev Schreiber Michael-James Olsen^{Y}					
Raven Darkhölme Mystique	Rebecca Romijn		Jennifer Lawrence Morgan Lily^{Y} Rebecca Romijn^{O}				
Robert Louis "Bobby" Drake Iceman	Shawn Ashmore		Shawn Ashmore				
Frederick J. "Fred" Dukes Blob		Kevin Durand	"Giant" Gustav Claude Ouimet				
Clarice Fong Blink			Fan Bingbing			Jamie Chung	
Esme Frost Stepford Cuckoos	Uncredited actresses					Skyler Samuels	
Sophie Frost Stepford Cuckoos	Uncredited actresses					Skyler Samuels	
Phoebe Frost Stepford Cuckoos	Uncredited actresses					Skyler Samuels	
Dr. Jean Grey Phoenix / Dark Phoenix	Famke Janssen Haley Ramm^{Y}	Famke Janssen	Famke Janssen^{O} Sophie Turner Summer Fontana^{Y}				
James "Logan" Howlett Wolverine	Hugh Jackman	Hugh Jackman Troye Sivan^{Y}	Hugh Jackman				
Jubilation Lee Jubilee	Katrina Florence Kea Wong		Lana Condor				
Erik Lehnsherr Magneto	Ian McKellen Brett Morris^{Y}	Ian McKellen^{C}	Michael Fassbender Ian McKellen^{O} Bill Milner^{Y}				
Dr. Moira "Moira X" MacTaggert	Olivia Williams		Rose Byrne				
Cain Marko Juggernaut	Vinnie Jones			Ryan Reynolds David Leitch			
Marie D'Ancanto Rogue	Anna Paquin		Anna Paquin				
Peter Maximoff Quicksilver		Uncredited actor	Evan Peters	Evan Peters^{C}			
Dr. Henry "Hank" McCoy Beast	Steve Bacic Kelsey Grammer		Nicholas Hoult Kelsey Grammer^{O}	Nicholas Hoult^{C}			
Ororo Munroe Storm	Halle Berry	April Elleston Enahoro^{E}^{C}	Halle Berry^{O} Alexandra Shipp	Alexandra Shipp^{C}			
En Sabah Nur Apocalypse			Oscar Isaac Berdj Garabedian^{O} Brendan Pedder^{Y}				
Katherine Anne "Kitty" Pryde Shadowcat	Sumela Kay Katie Stuart Elliot Page (Note: Credited as Ellen Page; The Last Stand and Days of Future Past were released before Page came out as transgender.)		Elliot Page				
Piotr "Peter" Rasputin Colossus	Donald Mackinnon Daniel Cudmore		Daniel Cudmore	Stefan Kapičić^{V}			
Jason Stryker Mutant 143	Michael Reid McKay	Uncredited actor					
William Stryker II	Brian Cox	Danny Huston	Josh Helman				
Alexander "Alex" Summers Havok			Lucas Till				
Scott Summers Cyclops	James Marsden	Tim Pocock	James Marsden^{O} Tye Sheridan	Tye Sheridan^{C}			
Kurt Wagner Nightcrawler	Alan Cumming		Kodi Smit-McPhee	Kodi Smit-McPhee^{C}			
Wade Wilson Deadpool		Ryan Reynolds Scott Adkins		Ryan Reynolds (Note: Reynolds also portrays a fictionalised version of himself in a mid-credits scene in Deadpool 2.)			
Warren Worthington III Angel / Archangel	Ben Foster Cayden Boyd^{Y}		Ben Hardy				
Charles Xavier Professor X	Patrick Stewart	Patrick Stewart	James McAvoy Patrick Stewart^{O} Laurence Belcher^{Y}	James McAvoy^{C}	Harry Lloyd		
Yukio		Rila Fukushima		Shioli Kutsuna			

== Reception ==
=== Box office performance ===
Film	U.S. release date	Box office gross			All-time ranking		Production budget	Ref.
Film	U.S. release date	U.S. and Canada	Other territories	Worldwide	U.S. & Canada	Worldwide	Production budget	Ref.
X-Men	July 14, 2000	$157,299,718	$139,039,810	$296,339,528	330	479	$75 million	
X2	May 2, 2003	$214,949,694	$192,761,855	$407,711,549	178	282	$110 million	
X-Men: The Last Stand	May 26, 2006	$234,362,462	$226,072,829	$460,435,291	140	236	$210 million	
X-Men Origins: Wolverine	May 1, 2009	$179,883,157	$193,179,707	$373,062,864	252	320	$150 million	
X-Men: First Class	June 3, 2011	$146,408,305	$206,208,385	$352,616,690	373	360	$160 million	
The Wolverine	July 26, 2013	$132,556,852	$282,271,394	$414,828,246	449	271	$120 million	
X-Men: Days of Future Past	May 23, 2014	$233,921,534	$512,124,166	$746,045,700	143	98	$205 million	
Deadpool	February 12, 2016	$363,070,709	$419,766,082	$782,836,791	46	89	$58 million	
X-Men: Apocalypse	May 27, 2016	$155,442,489	$388,491,616	$543,934,105	336	178	$178 million	
Logan	March 3, 2017	$226,277,068	$392,902,882	$619,179,950	154	144	$97 million	
Deadpool 2	May 18, 2018	$324,591,735	$461,304,874	$785,896,609	64	87	$110 million	
Dark Phoenix	June 7, 2019	$65,845,974	$186,597,000	$252,442,974	1,246	584	$200 million	
The New Mutants	August 28, 2020	$23,852,659	$25,316,935	$49,169,594	3,294	3,085	$67–80 million	
Total		$2,458,462,356	$3,626,037,535	$6,084,499,891	#7	#8	$1.735 billion	

=== Critical response ===
Critical and public response to X-Men
Film	Critical		Public
Film	Rotten Tomatoes	Metacritic	CinemaScore
Original trilogy
X-Men	82% (176 reviews)	64 (33 reviews)	A−
X2	85% (249 reviews)	68 (37 reviews)	A
X-Men: The Last Stand	56% (235 reviews)	58 (38 reviews)	A−
Prequel films
X-Men: First Class	86% (294 reviews)	65 (38 reviews)	B+
X-Men: Days of Future Past	90% (328 reviews)	75 (44 reviews)	A
X-Men: Apocalypse	47% (345 reviews)	52 (48 reviews)	A−
Dark Phoenix	22% (385 reviews)	43 (52 reviews)	B−
Wolverine trilogy
X-Men Origins: Wolverine	37% (255 reviews)	40 (39 reviews)	B+
The Wolverine	71% (259 reviews)	61 (46 reviews)	A−
Logan	93% (428 reviews)	77 (51 reviews)	A−
Deadpool
Deadpool	85% (345 reviews)	65 (49 reviews)	A
Deadpool 2	83% (417 reviews)	66 (51 reviews)	A
The New Mutants
The New Mutants	36% (137 reviews)	43 (20 reviews)	—N/a

Critical response to the television series
Title	Season	Rotten Tomatoes	Metacritic
Legion	1	90% (239 reviews)	82 (40 reviews)
Legion	2	91% (160 reviews)	85 (10 reviews)
Legion	3	93% (71 reviews)	72 (6 reviews)
The Gifted	1	76% (54 reviews)	63 (22 reviews)
The Gifted	2	83% (12 reviews)	—N/a

=== Legacy ===
Richard George of IGN stated that the success of the first X-Men film paved the way for comic-book film adaptations such as the Spider-Man series (2002–present), Fantastic Four (2005), V for Vendetta (2005) and Singer's Superman Returns (2006). Chris Hewitt of Empire magazine called the first X-Men film as the "catalyst" for films based on Marvel Comics characters, stating "Singer's 2000 film is the catalyst for everything that's come since, good and bad. Without it, there's no Marvel Studios." Comic-book writer Mark Millar said that Singer's X-Men "revolutionized" superhero films.

Rebecca Rubin of Variety magazine stated that the X-Men franchise has proven there is an audience for a hardline superhero film, while Jeff Bock of Exhibitor Relations said that with films like the Deadpool films and Logan, the studios can do more with an R-rated film and give the audience something new. However, Tim Grierson and Will Leitch of New York magazine's Vulture criticized the series, noting that the best films of the series failed to capture the zeitgeist the way Marvel Cinematic Universe films did.
