= Natalie Alyn Lind =

American actress (born 1999/2000)

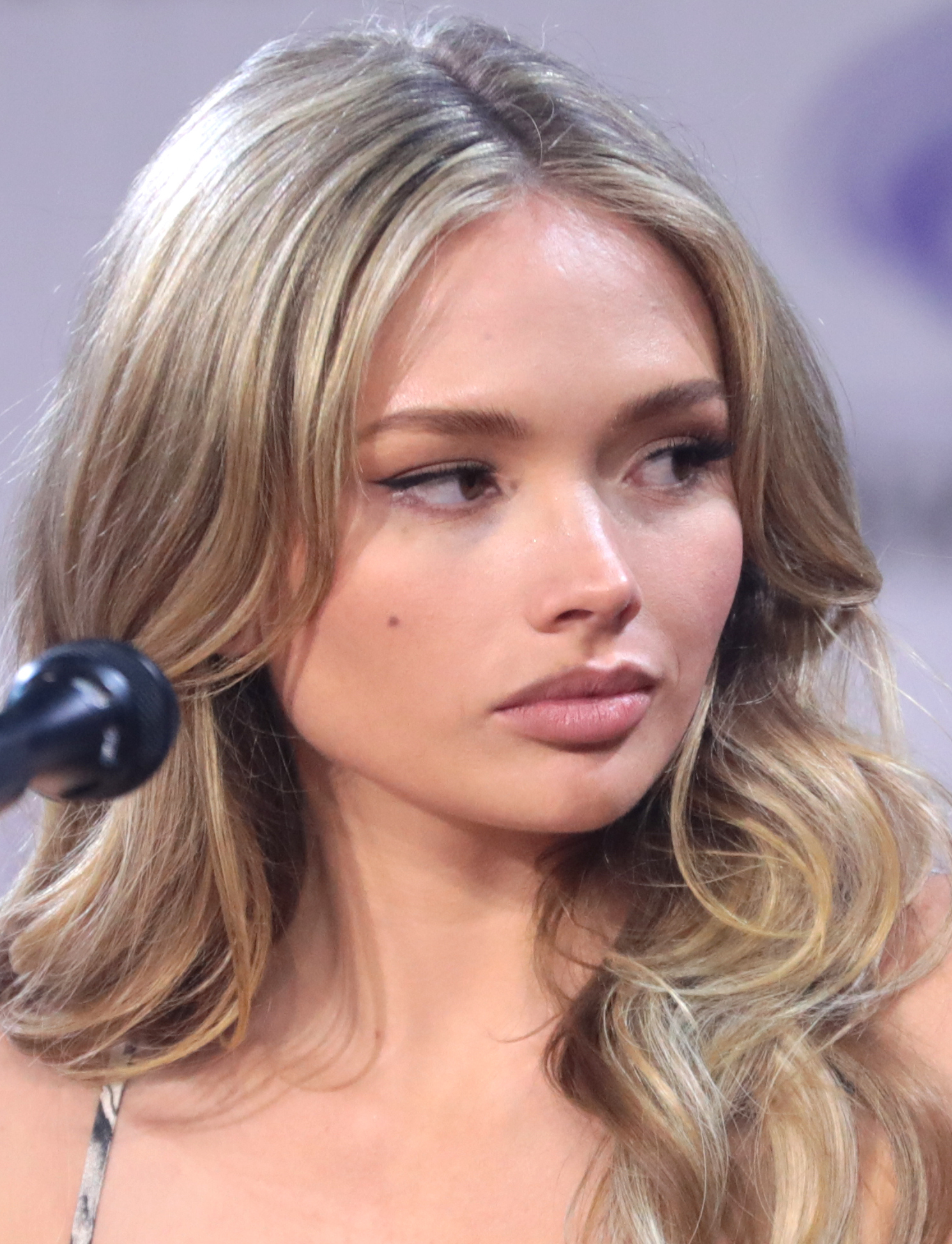
- Lind in 2023
- Born: 1999 or 2000 (age 26–27)
- Occupation: Actress
- Years active: 2006–present
- Mother: Barbara Alyn Woods
- Relatives: Emily Alyn Lind (sister); Alyvia Alyn Lind (sister)

Natalie Alyn Lind (born 1999/2000) is an American actress. She is known for her television series appearances, such as her recurring roles as Dana Caldwell in The Goldbergs and Silver St. Cloud in Gotham, and for her starring roles as Lauren Strucker in Fox's The Gifted (2017–2019), Danielle Sullivan in the first season of the ABC series Big Sky (2020–2021), and Oreana Lynn Jackson in the Paramount+ series Dutton Ranch (2026). She appeared as Norma in the movie Pet Sematary: Bloodlines (2023).

== Early life ==
Lind is the oldest daughter of producer John Lind and actress Barbara Alyn Woods. She has two younger sisters, Emily and Alyvia, who are also actresses.

== Career ==
Lind started her career as a child actress, in 2006 in an episode of the series One Tree Hill.

She appeared in a recurring role as Dana Caldwell in the ABC series The Goldbergs and has had guest roles on such series as Criminal Minds, iCarly, Wizards of Waverly Place, and Flashpoint. She was cast as Silver St. Cloud in season two of Gotham, which debuted on September 21, 2015. Lind was cast in the role of Lauren Strucker, a mutant in the X-Men-derived Fox TV pilot The Gifted, which was picked up to series in May 2017. In June 2019, she was cast in a starring role of Ashley in the second season of the CBS All Access drama series, Tell Me a Story.

In March 2020, Lind was cast on ABC's Big Sky, playing the role of Danielle Sullivan, a kidnapping victim. In 2023, it was announced that she would be acting in the young adult romance Marked Men: Rule + Shaw directed by Nick Cassavetes.

== Filmography ==
=== Film ===
Year	Title	Role	Notes	Ref.
2010	Blood Done Sign My Name	Boo Tyson		
2010	Kaboom	Cult Victim		
2014	Mockingbird	Jacob's Friend #4		
2023	Justice League X RWBY: Super Heroes & Huntsmen, Part One	Wonder Woman / Diana Prince	Voice role; direct-to-video film	
2023	Pet Sematary: Bloodlines	Norma		
2025	Marked Men: Rule + Shaw	Cora Lewis		
2027	Jason	Lauren	Post-production	
TBA	Halloween Store	Amy Harper	Post-production; also producer	

=== Television ===
Year	Title	Role	Notes	Ref.
2006	One Tree Hill	Alicia	Episode: "All These Things I've Done"	
2008	Army Wives	Little Roxy LeBlanc	Episode: "Great Expectations"	
2010	Flashpoint	Alexis Sobol	Episode: "Jumping at Shadows"	
2010	iCarly	Bree	Episode: "iSell Penny Tees"	
2010	Criminal Minds	Kayla Bennett	Episode: "Safe Haven"	
2010	November Christmas	Grandniece • Pirate	Television film	
2011	Wizards of Waverly Place	Marisa	Episode: "Wizards vs. Angels"	
2012	Playdate	Olive Valentine	Television film; credited as Natalie Lind	
2013	Dear Dumb Diary	Claire Vanderhied	Television film; uncredited role	
2013–2017, 2019–2020, 2023	The Goldbergs	Dana Caldwell	Recurring role (seasons 1–3, 7), guest star (seasons 4, 10); 27 episodes	
2015	Murder in the First	Daisy	Episode: "State of the Union"	
2015	Gotham	Silver St. Cloud	Recurring role; 7 episodes (season 2)	
2016	Chicago Fire	Laurel	Episode: "Nobody Else Is Dying Today"	
2017	iZombie	Winslow Sutcliffe	Episode: "Zombie Knows Best"	
2017–2019	The Gifted	Lauren Strucker	Main cast; 29 episodes	
2019	Daybreak	Mavis	Episode: "Canta Tu Vida"	
2019–2020	Tell Me a Story	Ashley Rose Pruitt	Main cast; 10 episodes (season 2)	
2020–2021	Big Sky	Danielle Sullivan	Main cast; 7 episodes (season 1)	
2024	Sugar	Rachel Kaye	Episode: "Olivia"	
2026–present	Dutton Ranch	Oreana Lynn Jackson	Main cast; 9 episodes	
