= Emma Dumont =

American actor (born 1994)

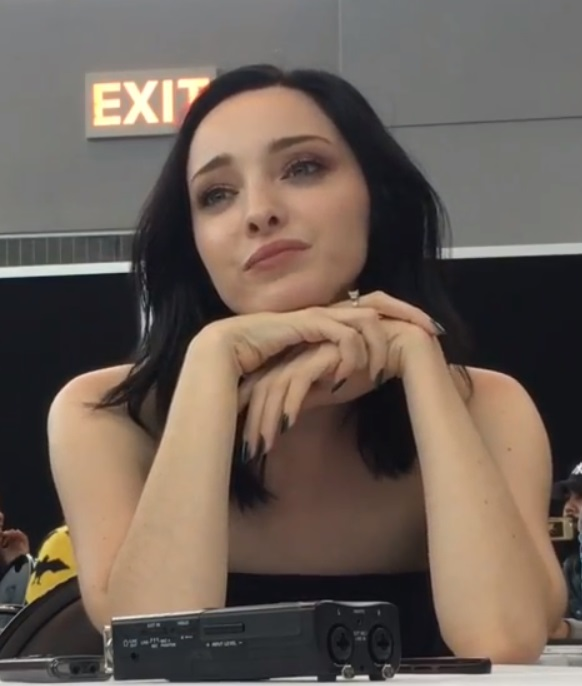
- Dumont at New York Comic Con 2017
- Born: November 15, 1994 (age 31); Seattle, Washington, U.S.
- Other name: Nick Dumont
- Occupation: Actor
- Years active: 2009–present

Nick Dumont (born November 15, 1994), known professionally as Emma Dumont, is an American actor. They (Note: Dumont is transmasculine and non-binary and uses they/them pronouns.) are known for their roles as Melanie Segal in the ABC Family series Bunheads, Emma Karn in the NBC series Aquarius, Lorna Dane/Polaris in the FOX series The Gifted, and Jackie Oppenheimer in the Christopher Nolan biographical thriller Oppenheimer (2023).

== Early life and education ==
Dumont was born in Seattle, Washington on November 15, 1994. They attended Washington Middle School and later James A. Garfield High School before homeschooling in order to pursue modeling and acting. They also attended Orange County High School of the Arts in the Music and Theater Conservatory in Santa Ana, California.

Dumont began performing in community theater at age six with performances at Seattle Public Theatre and Seattle Musical Theatre among others.

In 2011, they were a member of a FIRST Tech Challenge team located in Pasadena, California and in 2012 a FIRST Robotics Competition team based in Burbank, California in 2013. Dumont spoke at the 2013 FIRST World Championship at a VIP Dinner on April 26, 2013.

== Career ==
Dumont is an actor, dancer, and model.

Dumont's first film role was in True Adolescents in 2007 (released 2009) alongside Melissa Leo and Mark Duplass. They later appeared in the movie Dear Lemon Lima (2009).

In January 2010, Dumont won the V magazine V A Model search contest, appearing in the March 2010 issue and receiving a Ford Models contract.

In 2011, they were cast in a lead role in Stephen Gaghan's NBC pilot Metro, alongside Noah Emmerich and Jimmy Smits. In October 2011, Dumont was cast in the ABC Family original series, Bunheads, starring Sutton Foster and Kelly Bishop. Throughout 2012 and early 2013, they portrayed Melanie Segal, who attends the dance academy run by the lead's mother-in-law in the TV series.

In 2014, Dumont filmed two television pilots for NBC: Aquarius, which ran for two seasons, and Salvation (starring Ashley Judd), which was not picked up as a series. In March 2017, they were cast in Fox's pilot for an X-Men television series, The Gifted, which was picked up to series in May 2017 and premiered the same year, in October.

Dumont portrayed Jackie Oppenheimer, the sister-in-law of J. Robert Oppenheimer, in the biopic Oppenheimer, directed by Christopher Nolan.

== Personal life ==
Dumont participated in For Inspiration and Recognition of Science and Technology (FIRST) Robotics on a team sponsored by NASA/JPL and Walt Disney Imagineering.

In 2024, Dumont began using they/them pronouns on their Instagram. In December, Dumont came out as transmasculine and non-binary, changing their name on the platform to Nick Dumont. Their publicist stated they use the name Nick with friends and family but will continue using the name Emma professionally.

== Filmography ==
=== Film ===
Year	Title	Role	Notes	Ref.
2009	True Adolescents	Cara	Credited as Emma Noelle Roberts	
2009	Dear Lemon Lima	Kellie	Credited as Emma Noelle Roberts	
2012	Nobody Walks	Yma		
2014	Inherent Vice	Zinnia		
2017	The Body Tree	Sandra		
2019	What Lies Ahead	Jessica		
2021	Wrong Turn	Milla D'Angelo		
2021	Licorice Pizza	Brenda		
2023	Oppenheimer	Jackie Oppenheimer		

=== Television ===
Year	Title	Role	Notes	Ref.
2012–13	Bunheads	Melanie "Mel" Segal	18 episodes; main role	
2014	Mind Games	Sofie	1 episode; "Pet Rock"	
2014	Starving in Suburbia	Kayden	Television film	
2015–16	Aquarius	Emma Karn	24 episodes; main role	
2016	The Fosters	Sasha	1 episode; "Girl Code"	
2017	Pretty Little Liars	Katherine Daly	1 episode; "Playtime"	
2017–18	Tagged	Zoe Desaul	16 episodes; main role	
2017–19	The Gifted	Lorna Dane / Polaris	24 episodes; main role	
2019	King of Bots 2	Themself	8 episodes; panelist	
2019	All Rise	Phoebe	1 episode	
