= The Gifted season 2 =

The Gifted
- Season 2
- Promotional poster
- Showrunner: Matt Nix
- Starring: Stephen Moyer; Amy Acker; Sean Teale; Natalie Alyn Lind; Percy Hynes White; Coby Bell; Jamie Chung; Blair Redford; Emma Dumont; Skyler Samuels; Grace Byers
- No. of episodes: 16

Release
- Original network: Fox
- Original release: September 25, 2018 – February 26, 2019

Season chronology
- ← Previous; Season 1

The second and final season of the American television series The Gifted is based on Marvel Comics' X-Men properties, and follows ordinary parents who take their family on the run after they discover their children's mutant abilities. The season is connected to the X-Men film series, set in an alternate timeline where the X-Men have disappeared. It was produced by 20th Century Fox Television in association with Marvel Television, with Matt Nix serving as showrunner.

Stephen Moyer and Amy Acker star as the parents, alongside Sean Teale, Natalie Alyn Lind, Percy Hynes White, Coby Bell, Jamie Chung, Blair Redford, and Emma Dumont. They are joined by Skyler Samuels, promoted from a recurring guest role in the first season, and Grace Byers. A second season was ordered in January 2018, and began filming that June. It depicts the different approaches to the fight for mutant civil rights that are taken by the Mutant Underground and the Hellfire Club, and also introduces the Morlocks and further explores the Purifiers—all groups originating in the comics.

The season aired between September 25, 2018 and February 26, 2019, and consisted of 16 episodes.

== Episodes ==
No. overall	No. in season	Title	Directed by	Written by	Original release date	Prod. code	U.S. viewers (millions)
14	1	"eMergence"	Robert Duncan McNeill	Matt Nix	September 25, 2018	2LAJ01	2.58
After recruiting the mutants Lorna Dane / Polaris and Andy Strucker for the "Inner Circle" of the Hellfire Club, Reeva Payge stages a coup and takes control of the organization. Six months later in Washington D.C., the new Inner Circle buys a large munitions factory to clear out so Polaris has a place to safely give birth. The Mutant Underground works to save endangered mutants from the government agency Sentinel Services. Marcos Diaz / Eclipse, the father of Polaris's child, and Andy's mother Caitlin try to gain information on the Inner Circle from the mutant hacker Wire; but only learn of their vast resources and power. Caitlin's husband Reed and daughter Lauren are ready to stop looking for Andy, and Reed is also concerned by his latent mutant abilities manifesting. When Polaris goes into labor, her powers cause electrical disturbances across the city and the Underground unsuccessfully tries to follow them back to her. The Frosts give Polaris a vision of the future she wants for her child, allowing her to give birth to baby Dawn.
15	2	"unMoored"	Steven DePaul	Rashad Raisani	October 2, 2018	2LAJ02	2.25
Three years ago, Evangeline Whedon recruits John Proudstar / Thunderbird to lead the Atlanta station for the Mutant Underground. In the present, she refuses to take on the Inner Circle but gives Thunderbird the location of a mutant, Erg, who may know more. Caitlin and Reed continue to argue about Andy while Lauren reveals to her father she has her own trauma from killing fifteen people back in Atlanta. Meanwhile, Jace Turner tries to be a lawyer but is still obsessed with mutants, before telling his wife that he can move on. Andy and Lauren have shared dreams which interfere with his training. As Reeva and the Frosts kill any humans involved with Dawn's birth, Reeva considers killing Andy for trying to contact his family, but instead motivates him to complete his training. Polaris discovers baby Dawn is very sick.
16	3	"coMplications"	Michael Goi	Michael Horowitz	October 9, 2018	2LAJ03	2.06
Six years ago, Marcos' dying father rejects his son because he was a mutant. In the present, he is kidnapped by the Frosts to cure baby Dawn's jaundice. As Lauren and Reed return from a supply run, Reed's powers manifest, melting the steering wheel and causing them to crash. Jace Turner heads to D.C., despite what he told his wife and checks out the scene, glimpsing the Struckers and realizing they are not dead like the authorities believe. The police refuse to listen because of his dismissal from SS. Marcos is able to cure his daughter. He briefly overcomes the Frosts' telepathy to try and fight for his family, but he is disarmed by Reeva and she removes him from Inner Circle headquarters. Johnny and Clarice search for Erg's group, the Morlocks, in the sewers. Erg tells Clarice that mutants live down there away from everyone else. Erg offers information if Clarice agrees to be his spy on the surface. Reed confesses his powers to Caitlin, which also melted their information on the Inner Circle. Clarice finds that the Frosts were looking into the Health Department. Marcos returns swearing revenge, as Reeva prepares for the next phase of her plans.
17	4	"outMatched"	Deran Sarafian	Marta Gené Camps	October 16, 2018	2LAJ04	1.93
16 years ago, Caitlin refuses to terminate her pregnancy of Andy even though it represents a high risk for both of them. In the present, the Underground, seeking a hacker's help again, discover that the Frosts have killed Wire. The Underground kidnaps his brother Graph, who refuses to help them until Caitlin exploits his addiction to Kick. Graph discovers the Inner Circle is attacking an old mental hospital where Lorna was held years ago. Lauren, Marcos, Johnny and Clarice go to stop them. When Sage blocks Graph's hacking, Caitlin gives him more Kick, which induces a near-fatal overdose. At the facility, Johnny and Clarice confront Lorna, who releases the other patients to cover her escape. As the Inner Circle tries to escape with a patient, Marcos and Lauren block them. Andy rejects his sister and blasts them away, knocking Lauren out. His parents are devastated and Reed's powers violently manifest again. On television, the hospital staff confess to inhumane treatment of their patients and the attack is seen as a rallying point for mutant rights. Jace's wife leaves him because he refuses to move on. Jace is then approached by the Purifiers, whom he joins after seeing news of the hospital incident.
18	5	"afterMath"	Scott Peters	Melissa R. Byer & Treena Hancock	October 30, 2018	2LAJ05	1.96
12 years ago, rookie police officer Jace does not like his partner harassing a mutant but goes along with it. In the present, he suggests the Purifiers win over the public by rounding up the fugitive mutants that escaped from the mental hospital. At the clinic, Caitlin and Johnny treat the hospital escapees and Lauren, who is distraught about Andy. When the Purifiers attack, they are forced to let one mutant die to keep themselves hidden before the Purifiers flee from approaching police. Stealing some files, Jace comes up with another plan. Meanwhile, the Inner Circle prepares their new mutant Rebecca/Twist for her role in their plans but she is unresponsive. Andy takes her out for her first taste of freedom in years as she was the clinic's most dangerous patient. She shows Andy her power of turning things inside out and they destroy a police car together, kissing when they return. Clarice takes the other patients to hide with the Morlocks. Erg takes them on the condition they brand a "M" mark into their cheeks, disgusting Marcos. Erg also encourages "Blink" to not hide who she is, like she does with the Mutant Underground.
19	6	"iMprint"	Michael Goi	Dawn Kamoche & Ariella Blejer	November 6, 2018	2LAJ06	2.31
Jace realizes the Mutant Underground has a base in Baltimore. He sends the Purifiers to bomb a church to flush people out. Reed, Clarice, Marcos and Johnny go to help out, reuniting with several mutants from Atlanta, including Shatter and Pedro. The Purifiers attack, handing over Pedro to SS. Jace kills Shatter in the attack. Reed melts a wall for the others to escape but then cannot turn off his power. Lauren and Caitlin track a former doctor of the mental hospital, learning Rebecca used her powers to kill her family by turning their skulls inside out. Lorna grows frustrated with Reeva hiding the plan so Esme shows her the bank they plan to attack, which has mutant detecting technology. Lorna seems to like Esme but attacks her when she realizes Esme was in baby Dawn's mind. Esme apologizes, revealing she and her sisters were quintuplet clones created as weapons. They killed their handlers at age 13, but the other two sisters, Celeste and Mindee were killed—which the surviving triplets felt. Esme swears to protect Lorna and Dawn, so Lorna stays with the Inner Circle.
20	7	"no Mercy"	Nina Lopez-Corrado	Brad Marques	November 13, 2018	2LAJ07	1.89
Eight years ago, Reeva wants her local mutant community to work with humans but her mutant friend is killed right in front of her by human racists. In the present, she dates a bank employee she genuinely likes even though she's using him as part of the plan. The Inner Circle attacks the bank, promising nobody will be hurt if they cooperate. While draining their funds, the Frosts force the employees to confess to persecuting mutants and take something from the vault. On their way out Rebecca, wanting to punish humans, happily kills all the employees; horrifying even Reeva. The Mutant Underground moves Reed to the now abandoned clinic, where Caitlin convinces him to go see his father's old assistant Madeline. Marcos and Johnny confront Clarice for working for Erg, which she admits, reasoning that the Morlocks have a plan to help mutants while the Underground is a mess with no vision. Jace meets with television reporter Benedict Ryan, who wants Jace to expose the lies of Sentinel Services. He refuses at first, but is convinced after he hears about the bank incident.
21	8	"the dreaM"	Robert Duncan McNeill	Carly Soteras	November 27, 2018	2LAJ08	2.17
Flashbacks show Lorna was a rebellious teen living with her aunt and could never talk about her birth father, who only left her a medallion. Rebecca leaves the Inner Circle while escaping the bank. With anti-mutant attacks on the rise, Lorna fears for Dawn's safety. Esme suggests a mutant school in Switzerland. Lorna lets a distraught Marcos say goodbye to Dawn; but actually takes her to her aunt, realizing her own father did the same to keep her safe. Lorna turns the medallion into a helmet for herself. When Johnny and Clarice try to track the Inner Circle, Rebecca tells them they were looking into the tech company, Regimen. Rebecca is later captured by Fade. The Struckers meet Madeline, who is able to temporarily stabilize Reed's powers, but wants to study Lauren to make a cure; which she's done for any mutant who has come to her. Her assistant Noah, who got control of his vibration powers under her, convinces Lauren she might have a normal life. However, she is horrified to learn that Madeline wants to cure all mutants and her brother, Matthew, founded the Purifiers.
22	9	"gaMe changer"	Allison Liddi-Brown	Melinda Hsu Taylor	December 4, 2018	2LAJ09	2.02
One year ago, Rebecca's parents turn her in to Sentinel Services. In the present, Andy disagrees with Reeva imprisoning Rebecca as the humans did. He decides to free Rebecca and run, but she wants to kill the entire Inner Circle instead. Andy accidentally kills her in the process of thwarting her attack. Johnny, Marcos, and Clarice kidnap an analyst from Regimen. Clarice leaves John after his obsession with stopping the Inner Circle causes a manhunt for all mutants in the area. The analyst reveals Regimen controls every mutant prison collar in the country. Fade arrives and kills the analyst on Reeva's orders, but is captured by Johnny and Marcos. The Purifiers find them, so Johnny stays behind to allow Marcos and Fade to escape, which leads to Jace capturing him. Lauren convinces her parents to destroy Madeline's research, while Madeline herself reveals Lauren's DNA has two strains of the X-gene. She and Noah stop the Struckers, but after the former says mutants, including the latter and Lauren, should not have been born, Noah turns on her and destroys her research so the Struckers can escape. Lorna and Andy destroy the Regimen servers, freeing every incarcerated mutant in the country.
23	10	"eneMy of My eneMy"	Gregory Prange	Michael Horowitz	January 1, 2019	2LAJ10	1.73
Three years ago, Marcos, Lorna, and Johnny all promise to be there for each other when it matters most. In the present, as Jace interrogates Johnny at a Purifier compound, the Mutant Underground reluctantly asks Lorna for the Inner Circle's help in rescuing him. Lorna and Andy find the compound and join the Underground to assist. Andy's parents are happy to see him and tell him about Reed's powers, though Lauren does not trust him. Jace believes the Underground has been behind the mutant uprising, but pauses to consider Johnny's claim that Andy and Lorna left for the unsubstantiated Inner Circle—until he sees Lorna and Marcos attack the compound together. Believing Johnny lied, he becomes enraged and shoots him with a shotgun multiple times. Jace flees before Clarice, Andy, and Lauren arrive to rescue Johnny. On the way out of the compound, Andy delights in torturing a Purifier who tried to shoot Lauren, disgusting his family when he says they deserve to be wiped out. Caitlin determines they must destroy the Inner Circle to get him back. Lorna kisses Marcos goodbye, but claims it does not change anything between them. Clarice reaffirms her love for the wounded Johnny. The Strucker siblings train, separately, to increase their powers.
24	11	"meMento"	Maggie Kiley	Jim Garvey	January 8, 2019	2LAJ11	2.07
In 1985, after his sister's death, Andreas has the music box altered and leaves something behind after killing a shop owner with a powered sword. In the present, Reeva gathers new recruits to the Inner Circle, but their sadistic past makes Lorna realize she must be stopped. Lauren studies the Von Struckers, dreaming of Andrea's death and mirroring her power to turn her barriers into cutting disks. Caitlin approves of this as a means to take down the Inner Circle, though Reed is upset when Lauren risks exposure to distract cops that appear at their home. Lauren later intimidates the landlord with her powers after finding hair samples from both Original Fenris in the music box. Benedict sends the Purifiers to invade a youth shelter said to house mutants. While Jace seems remorseful, he covers up his partner killing a mutant teen in cold blood. He is seen as a hero in the media, but cannot face his ex-wife. Marcos and Clarice seek Erg for a tip. Lorna and Marcos reunite as a couple. Evangeline calls Johnny to gather the Mutant Underground. Investigating the tip, Lorna and Marcos see Reeva meet with Benedict.
25	12	"hoMe"	Dawn Wilkinson	Marta Gené Camps	January 15, 2019	2LAJ12	1.59
14 years ago, Clarice and her foster sister Lilly escape their abusive foster father, but Lilly goes back to save the other foster children and is killed. In the present, Evangeline arrives and reveals Lorna is their spy. She coerces Erg to come to the Underground meeting; recalling how they founded and led the Mutant Underground together until a human ally betrayed them, causing him to leave to form the Morlocks. The Inner Circle's recruits are sent on a mission to kill Evangeline and the other Underground leaders. Despite Lorna's warning, Johnny and company are too late to save them. With Johnny determined to keep fighting, Clarice tearfully leaves to join the Morlocks. Caitlin and Lauren reach out to Caitlin's brother, Danny, for government intelligence on the Purifiers and Reeva. He can only tell them the government is compromised before Lauren has to fight off SS agents so she and Caitlin can escape. The Frosts discover the mental link between Andy and Lauren, and convinces him to attempt to persuade Lauren to join their side by telling him it will save his family; hiding their intent to increase the Inner Circle's power.
26	13	"teMpted"	Jonathan Frakes	Melissa R. Byer & Treena Hancock	January 22, 2019	2LAJ13	1.82
Six years ago, Erg falls in love with a human woman, but she is caught by SS and betrays Evangeline and the Underground. Erg rejects her and vows never to trust a human again. In the present, a Morlock named Glow is shot on a supply run. Given the similarity of her powers to Marcos', Clarice brings him and Caitlin to the sewers to save Glow's life. Erg does not trust Caitlin, but accompanies her and Clarice out for medical supplies. Purifiers attack, but the three fight back and escape. They save Glow and Erg honors Caitlin. The Frosts use Andy to reach out to Lauren in her dreams, and she decides to give in, but Johnny and Reed track her down. Reed confesses he feels the allure of their family's power as well. Lauren agrees to return, and takes the serum to suppress her powers, cutting off her connection to Andy. Meanwhile, Lorna discovers that the Inner Circle's new recruits are targeting government buildings. Lorna sends Marcos after the recruit Max, ending with Marcos being shot before Max's car explodes.
27	14	"calaMity"	Stephen Surjik	Jason Lazarcheck	February 12, 2019	2LAJ14	1.60
Four years ago, Benedict struggles as a failing radio host, but Reeva promises to make him famous. In the present, she has him send Jace's Purifiers to attack the Morlocks in the sewers. Though the Morlocks kill a few Purifiers, Jace leads his team through, killing the Morlocks' fighters. Clarice asks for help evacuating the sewers. Lauren and Reed decide not to take the serum and face their powers. As the police close in on the evacuated Morlocks, Caitlin shoots her way through a police blockade to get away. Clarice has to stay behind in the sewers to get everyone out. While saving a mutant girl with Erg, Clarice is shot by Jace and her portal closes in front of John. Jace is shocked to find that they attacked children. When the Inner Circle discovers that Max is dead, Reeva locks down their headquarters to find the spy. Because Lorna was using Sage's password to spy on Max, Sage is blamed for his death. With Sage's brain immune to their telepathy, the Frosts are unable to determine her guilt or innocence, and Reeva – convinced Sage is the spy – kills her, devastating Lorna.
28	15	"Monsters"	Scott Peters	Carly Soteras	February 19, 2019	2LAJ15	1.61
Two months ago, Clarice does not believe she deserves to be happy because of her past; John says everyone deserves redemption, even Lorna and Andy. In the present, John saw her fall into a portal, unsure if she survived. While Jace processes what he has done, his partner Ted finds Reed. Reed's powers activate, killing Ted. Caitlin and Lauren take cover in an abandoned building as the latter's powers return. Reed and Marcos rescue them. Reeva prepares her plan; she and Andy will attack SS headquarters through the sewers, Lorna will take down communications, the Frosts will telepathically impose the idea of a mutant homeland as the solution, and the rest will destroy government buildings. Lorna tells Andy of Reeva and Benedict's arranging the attack on the Morlocks to clear out the sewers. Andy does not believe he can return to the Underground; convinced he is a monster. Reed, empathizing with Andy, confesses to killing Ted out of anger. Jace confronts Benedict, who tells him another mutant attack is coming. Andy and Lorna reunite with the Mutant Underground while John hears Clarice's voice. Upon learning Andy and Lorna defected, Reeva declares they will be killed.
29	16	"oMens"	Robert Duncan McNeill	Matt Nix	February 26, 2019	2LAJ16	1.61
Five years ago, after the 7/15 incident, Reed becomes a mutant crimes prosecutor to protect his family. In the present, Reeva has Benedict send Jace's Purifiers to attack the Mutant Underground. The Frosts sneak in with Fade and force Andy and Lauren to leave with them. John distracts the Purifiers so the others can go after them. Erg appears and helps Johnny, giving him the chance to have Jace at his mercy. The Frosts force Andy and Lauren to destroy SS headquarters. Lorna is able to speak to Esme of their friendship, weakening the Frosts' grip and allowing Marcos to knock out Sophie and Phoebe to save Andy and Lauren. As the adults battle the Inner Circle's recruits, Caitlin kills Fade. Reed confronts Reeva, wherein she turns her ability on him to destabilize his already volatile powers—-as he intended. He loses control and explodes, killing them both. Weeks later, Esme joins the Underground, forcing a confession out of Benedict. Jace is left in the hospital. Lorna and Marcos reunite with Dawn. The Struckers mourn Reed. Erg meets with the Underground, telling them mutants need new leadership. Clarice appears out of a portal, stating she wants to show them something.

== Cast and characters ==
=== Main ===
- Stephen Moyer as Reed Strucker
- Amy Acker as Caitlin Strucker
- Sean Teale as Marcos Diaz / Eclipse
- Natalie Alyn Lind as Lauren Strucker
- Percy Hynes White as Andy Strucker
- Coby Bell as Jace Turner
- Jamie Chung as Clarice Fong / Blink
- Blair Redford as John Proudstar / Thunderbird
- Emma Dumont as Lorna Dane / Polaris
- Skyler Samuels as the Frost Sisters
- Grace Byers as Reeva Payge

=== Recurring ===
- Hayley Lovitt as Teresia Karisik / Sage
- Michael Luwoye as Erg
- Anjelica Bette Fellini as Rebecca Hoover / Twist
- Jeff Daniel Phillips as Fade
- Tom O'Keefe as Officer Ted Wilson
- Peter Gallagher as Benedict Ryan
- James Carpinello as Max

=== Notable guests ===
- Ray Campbell as William
- Erinn Ruth as Evangeline
- Frances Turner as Paula Turner
- Sumalee Montano as Dr. Taylor
- Kathryn Erbe as Aunt Dane
- Kate Burton as Dr. Madeline Risman
- Ken Kirby as Noah
- Jeffrey Nordling as Daniel

== Production ==
=== Development ===
In October 2017, showrunner Matt Nix said that he had planned "a couple of seasons, in broad strokes" for The Gifted, and stated that he wanted "to be doing this show for a long time." On January 4, 2018, the series was renewed for a second season, of 16 episodes.

=== Writing ===
Following the end of the first season, Nix said that the second would further explore the Hellfire Club and the Purifiers, and would introduce the Morlocks. Following the destruction of the mutant underground's base, the second season sees them become more of a network rather than remain in a single location, and forces them to hide in plain sight and interact with other mutants out in the world. Nix thought this was both an interesting change and "thematically more resonant". Their situation is contrasted with the Hellfire Club also hiding in plain sight, but within "the halls of power". Nix continued that the season would show how these two factions go about helping mutants in different ways, and also how they come together at times due to the relationships between people in each group. He later expressed interest in also exploring the 7/15 incident that was mentioned in the first season, potentially through flashbacks, and said that such an exploration would take place over multiple episodes as "it's kind of at the center of everything we're doing."

The second season features a new organization from the comics after the first featured Trask Industries. Nix noted that the story for the season had been broken before this decision was made, and then the writers looked through the comics to see which elements lines up with the direction they wanted to go.

=== Casting ===
Returning from the first season to star are Stephen Moyer as Reed Strucker, Amy Acker as Caitlin Strucker, Sean Teale as Marcos Diaz / Eclipse, Natalie Alyn Lind as Lauren Strucker, Percy Hynes White as Andy Strucker, Coby Bell as Jace Turner, Jamie Chung as Clarice Fong / Blink, Blair Redford as John Proudstar / Thunderbird, and Emma Dumont as Lorna Dane / Polaris. By January 2018, Skyler Samuels, who recurred as the Stepford Cuckoos in the first season, was being looked at to be promoted to series regular for the show's second season, and she stated that her characters would be appearing more in the second season than the first either way. She was confirmed to be doing so in June along with the announcement that Grace Byers would also be joining the series as a series regular, in the role of Reeva Payge.

Also returning from the first season are Ray Campbell as William, Hayley Lovitt as Sage, Jeff Daniel Phillips as Fade, Erinn Ruth as Evangeline, and Francis Turner as Paula Turner. Additionally, Michael Luwoye was announced to have been cast as Erg, the leader of the Morlocks, in August 2018. Nix also revealed at that time that an original mutant named Twist would have a "big role" in the season. Newcomer Anjelica Bette Fellini was soon announced as cast in the role, which was described as coming across as "a sweet wounded bird" who reveals herself to be "a sociopath who lives for chaos". In October, James Carpinello was cast in the recurring role of Max, the undisciplined leader of a group of new recruits.

=== Filming ===
Filming for the season began on May 30, 2018.

== Release ==
=== Broadcast ===
The season began airing in the United States on Fox on September 25, 2018, and ran for 16 episodes.

=== Marketing ===
Nix, executive producer Jeph Loeb, and much of the cast promoted the season at San Diego Comic-Con 2018, where the first trailer for the season debuted; it gave the season the subtitle Dawn of the Mutant Age.

== Reception ==
=== Ratings ===
Viewership and ratings per episode of The Gifted season 2
No.	Title	Air date	Rating/share (18–49)	Viewers (millions)	DVR (18–49)	DVR viewers (millions)	Total (18–49)	Total viewers (millions)
1	"eMergence"	September 25, 2018	0.9/4	2.58	0.6	1.74	1.5	4.32
2	"unMoored"	October 2, 2018	0.7/3	2.25	0.6	1.62	1.3	3.87
3	"coMplications"	October 9, 2018	0.7/3	2.06	0.5	1.60	1.2	3.66
4	"outMatched"	October 16, 2018	0.6/3	1.93	0.5	1.35	1.1	3.28
5	"afterMath"	October 30, 2018	0.6/3	1.96	0.5	1.36	1.1	3.32
6	"iMprint"	November 6, 2018	0.7/3	2.31	0.5	1.41	1.2	3.71
7	"no Mercy"	November 13, 2018	0.6/3	1.89	0.4	1.31	1.0	3.20
8	"the dreaM"	November 27, 2018	0.7/3	2.17	0.5	1.33	1.2	3.50
9	"gaMe changer"	December 4, 2018	0.7/3	2.02	0.4	1.22	1.1	3.24
10	"eneMy of My eneMy"	January 1, 2019	0.5/2	1.73	0.5	1.47	1.0	3.20
11	"meMento"	January 8, 2019	0.6/3	2.07	0.4	1.20	1.0	3.27
12	"hoMe"	January 15, 2019	0.5/2	1.59	0.5	1.61	1.0	3.20
13	"teMpted"	January 22, 2019	0.5/2	1.82	0.4	1.30	0.9	3.12
14	"calaMity"	February 12, 2019	0.5/2	1.60	TBD	TBD	TBD	TBD
15	"Monsters"	February 19, 2019	0.5/2	1.61	TBD	TBD	TBD	TBD
16	"oMens"	February 26, 2019	0.4/2	1.61	TBD	TBD	TBD	TBD

=== Critical response ===
The review aggregator website Rotten Tomatoes reported an 83% approval rating, with an average rating of 6.83/10 based on 12 reviews. The website's consensus states, "The Gifted continues to explore shades of grey, but with a more streamlined story that sets the show up for a stronger — if slightly more simplistic — sophomore season."
