= List of The Gifted characters =

The Gifted is an American television series created for Fox by Matt Nix, based on Marvel Comics' X-Men properties. It is connected to the X-Men film series, set in an alternate timeline where the X-Men have disappeared. The first season, consisting of thirteen episodes, began airing on October 2, 2017. A second season of sixteen episodes was ordered in January 2018.

Stephen Moyer and Amy Acker star as Reed and Caitlin Strucker, ordinary parents who take their family on the run after they discover their children's mutant abilities. Also starring in the first season are Sean Teale as Marcos Diaz / Eclipse, Natalie Alyn Lind as Lauren Strucker, Percy Hynes White as Andy Strucker, Coby Bell as Jace Turner, Jamie Chung as Clarice Fong / Blink, Blair Redford as John Proudstar / Thunderbird, and Emma Dumont as Lorna Dane / Polaris. They are joined in the second season by Skyler Samuels, promoted from a recurring guest role in the first season, as the three Frost sisters—Esme, Sophie and Phoebe—and by Grace Byers as Reeva.

== Main characters ==
=== Reed Strucker ===
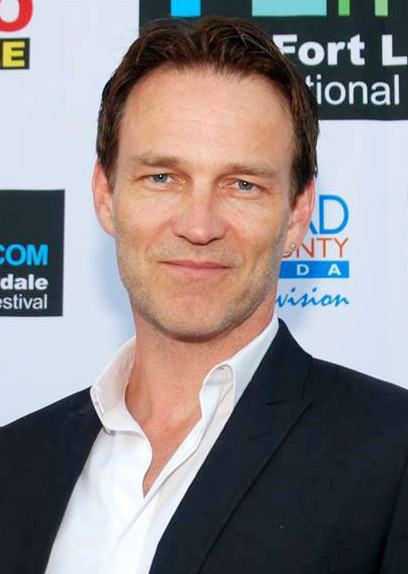
Stephen Moyer

Reed Strucker (portrayed by Stephen Moyer) is a father trying to balance his family responsibilities with his job as a district attorney. His father repressed his x-gene when he was a child, without his knowledge. In the beginning of the second season, Reed's stress causes his powers of disintegration to emerge uncontrollably.

Moyer was cast as Reed, the series' lead, in February 2017. He said of the character, "He thinks he's doing the right thing by moving [the mutants]. He does know these camps aren't particularly nice. He knows a few people he's captured have disappeared. He also knows this could happen to his kids. He has no choice but to go on the run." Reed was originally "more obviously out for himself and slightly less interested in his kids, slightly less interested in the marriage", but this was changed in reshoots of the pilot to make the character more likeable.

=== Caitlin Strucker ===
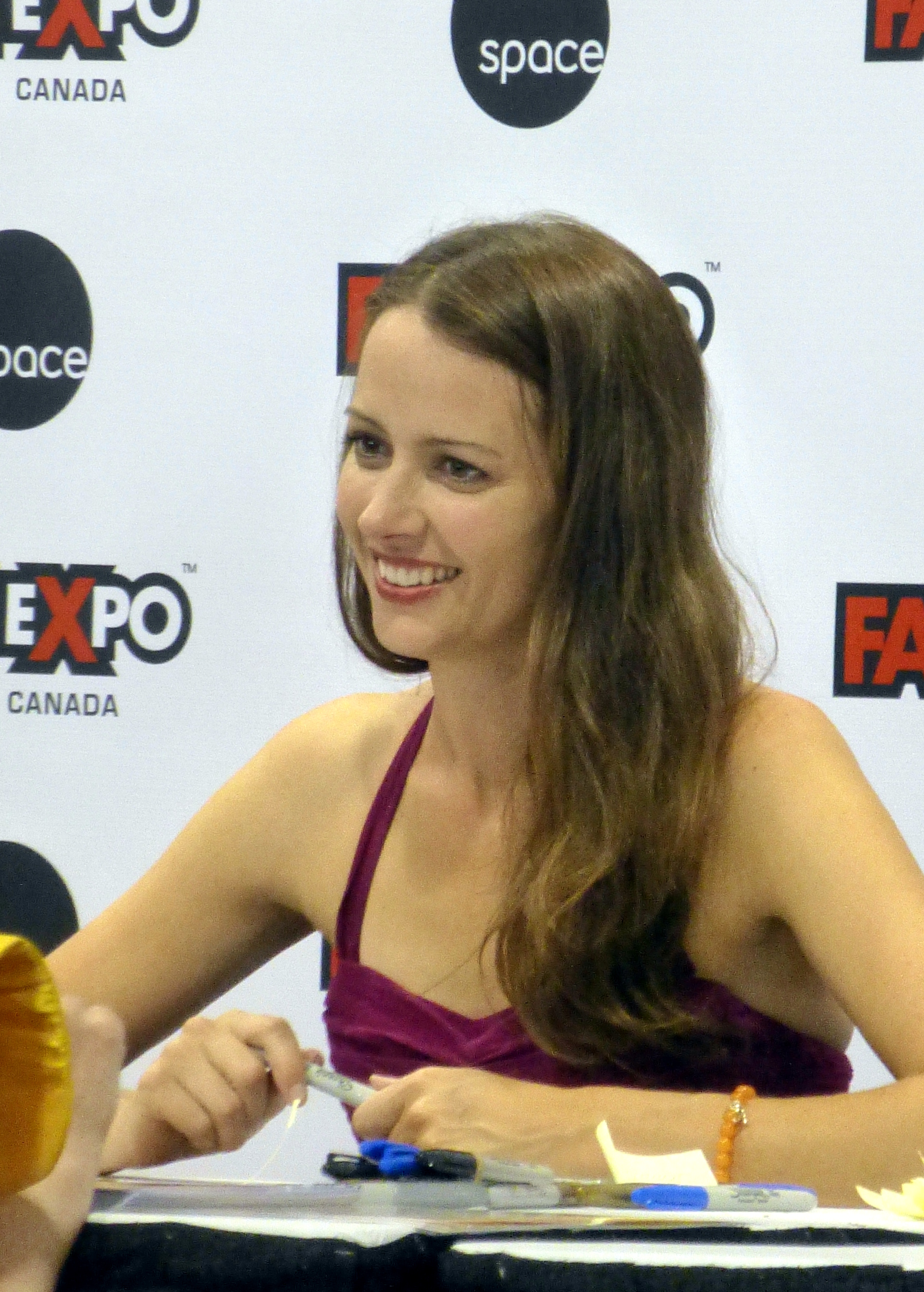
Amy Acker

Caitlin Strucker (portrayed by Amy Acker) is a mother and nurse struggling with her "increasingly challenging" teenage children. She later takes more of a leadership role in the Mutant Underground.

Acker joined the cast as Caitlin, the female lead for the series, in March 2017. She had auditioned alongside the already-cast Moyer; the pair did not meet the actors playing their children until the table read of the pilot episode. Showrunner Matt Nix said that though Caitlin does not have mutant powers, she is not "just a mom" or "just the doctor" in the series, and "over the course of the show I really love the idea of showing the evolution of a suburban mom into an underground warrior." Acker added that the character was "happy with the life that she had, and that all gets flipped around, pushing her to become who she should be."

=== Marcos Diaz / Eclipse ===
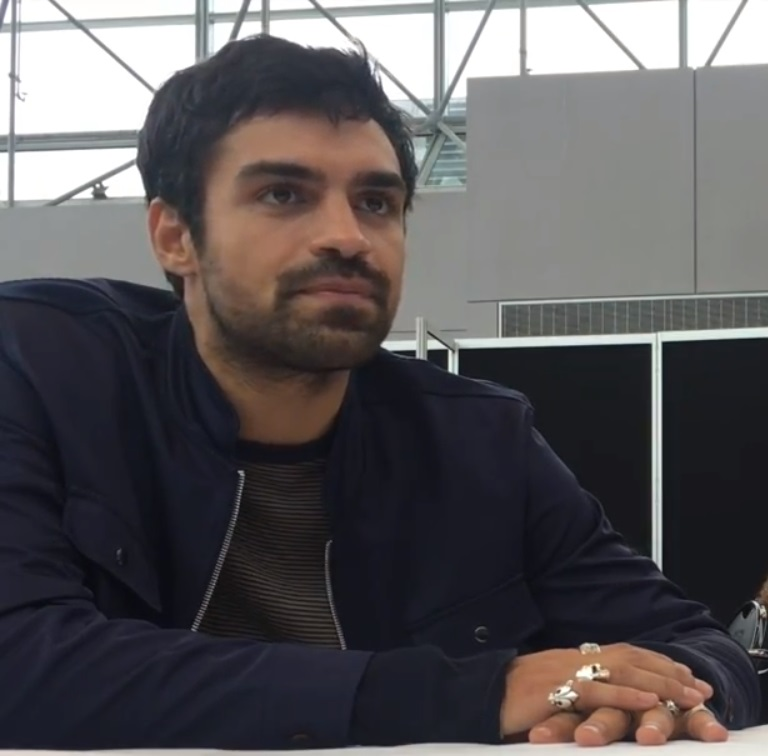
Sean Teale

Marcos Diaz (portrayed by Sean Teale) is a rebellious mutant who can absorb and manipulate photons, and goes by the moniker Eclipse. Eclipse was rejected by his human parents, and grew up smuggling drugs from Mexico to the United States. The mutant underground uses him to smuggle mutants to safety in Mexico.

Teale was cast as the character, who was created for the series, in February 2017. Eclipse took inspiration from comic characters such as Sunspot and Wolverine.

=== Lauren Strucker ===
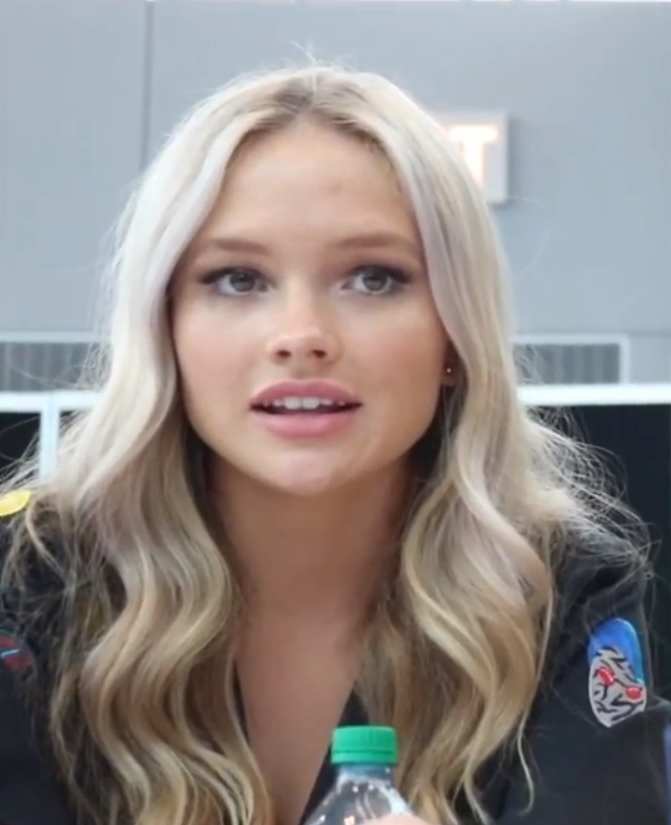
Natalie Alyn Lind

Lauren Strucker (portrayed by Natalie Alyn Lind) is one of the series' central children, a "perfect" kid. Her mutant power is creating forcefields which she does by compressing air molecules into shields. When holding hands with her brother, Andy, the two are able to combine their separate abilities into destructive light energy. This was inherited from their great-grandfather and his sister, the Von Struckers, who were mutant terrorists. Lauren fears her family's history and does not want to become like them. Later in the second season, after researching the Von Struckers, Lauren discovers she can rotate her shields at rapid rates, allowing them to cleanly slice through objects.

Lind was cast as Lauren in March 2017.

=== Andy Strucker / Andrew von Strucker ===
Andy Strucker (portrayed by Percy Hynes White) is one of the series' central children, a sensitive loner who keeps to himself. His mutant power is a form of telekinesis, being able to push things away and sideways, tear them apart, make them vibrate, etc. When holding hands with his sister, Lauren, the two are able to combine their separate abilities into destructive light energy. This was inherited from their great-grandfather and his sister, the Von Struckers, who were mutant terrorists. Unlike Lauren, who fears their family's past, Andy embraces it, renaming himself Andrew von Strucker. At the end of the first season, he leaves the Mutant Underground to join the Inner Circle.

White was cast as Andy in March 2017.

=== Jace Turner ===
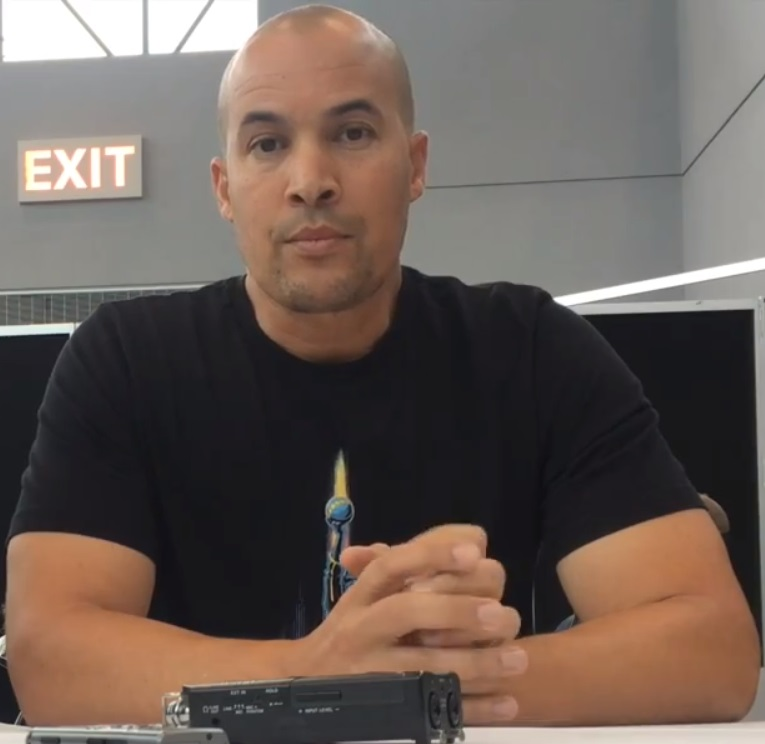
Coby Bell

Jace Turner (portrayed by Coby Bell) is a man struggling with the cold-blooded requirements of his job. Turner is a Sentinel Services agent, trying to find the Struckers and the other mutants.

Bell joined the series as Turner in March 2017, rounding out the series' regular cast. Nix said the character is "more than just a villain hoping to round up every last superpowered human," but is instead trying to find the balance between protecting society and taking away the rights of mutants. Turner quits at the end of the first season, but remains dedicated to the fight against the mutants who he feel "have taken everything from him". On the character potentially joining an extreme anti-mutant group like the Purifiers, Nix said it was important to note that the racial discrimination of the real world also exists within the series, and they would have to be careful when trying to associate an African-American character with a group reminiscent of the Ku Klux Klan.

=== Clarice Fong / Blink ===
Clarice Fong (portrayed by Jamie Chung) is a "sarcastic, lively" mutant with teleportation powers, who goes by Blink.

Chung was cast as Blink, a popular mutant from the comics, in February 2017. An "independently minded" member of the mutant underground, Blink begins the series using her abilities as "a way out of situations she doesn't want to be in", but her abilities and relationship to them evolve throughout the series. While discussing Asian representation in film, and television on series such as Fresh Off the Boat, Chung, who is Korean-American, credits both her casting and the earlier casting of Fan Bingbing as Blink (a character not portrayed as Asian in the comics) in X-Men: Days of Future Past to "the flexibility that 20th Century Fox has with turning these comic book characters into something a bit more reflective", with Chung's portrayal intended to be younger version of Bingbing's incarnation of the character, with the same original surname ("Fong") created for the character in the film, replacing their comic book surname ("Ferguson"). Chung wears heavy-duty contact lenses to portray Blink's mutant green eyes, and also has pink markings on her face; as the character's abilities grow, more markings are added, adding more similarity to the comic book character's appearance.

=== John Proudstar / Thunderbird ===
John Proudstar (portrayed by Blair Redford) is a strong-willed mutant, leader of the underground community, who goes by Thunderbird.

Redford was cast as a mutant leader named "Sam" in February 2017, who was revealed to actually be Thunderbird in May with the series order. Nix said the character is "dealing with his own issues of feeling the weight of thousands of years of Apache history and mutant history and an obligation to both families". Thunderbird is famous for being killed off shortly after his introduction in the comics, and though Nix said that this would not happen in the series, it will explore "the relationship of this guy to the Thunderbird of the comics". Thunderbird's costumes generally include a leather vest.

=== Lorna Dane / Polaris ===
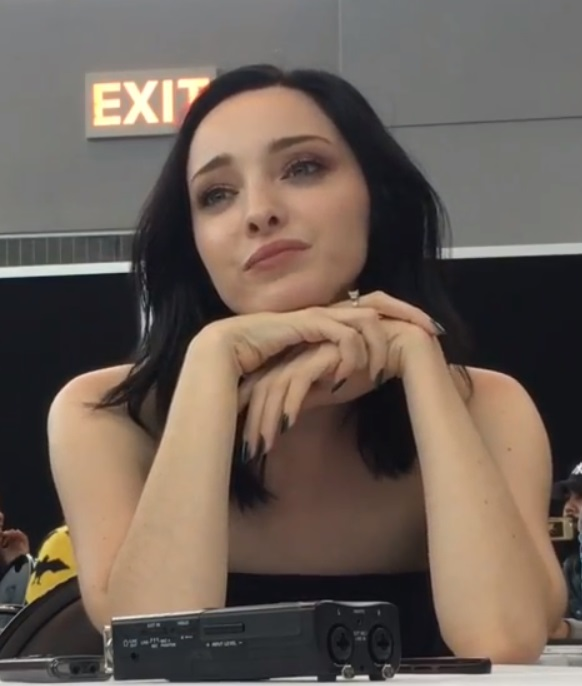
Emma Dumont

Lorna Dane (portrayed by Emma Dumont) is a brave and loyal mutant whose abilities include controlling magnetism. She prefers the name Polaris. She is introduced as being "unstable" due to bipolar disorder.

Dumont was cast in March 2017. Nix did not originally intend to have the character in the show, and only added her as a love interest for Eclipse, but later noted that she "emerges as a central character" for the series. The character is depicted with green hair, as she is in the comics, but "subdued shades of green". She initially hides her hair with dye, which comes out in a shower sequence for which hair designer Charles Yusko created twelve different wigs and hair pieces, some of which could change color. Dumont took mechanical engineering classes at Georgia State University to help understand the character's abilities, and based her hand movements for Polaris using her abilities on those of cosplayers that Nix saw at a comic convention in Dallas. Polaris's costume includes metallic elements such as rings that she can use as weapons, and steel-toed boots that she can use to levitate.

The pilot reveals that the character is pregnant, which Dumont thought would make a "normal person" more cautious, but for Polaris "it's the total reverse where she's like, 'I have something in the world to care about and now I'm going to fight even harder,' and that is probably pretty dangerous." The pregnancy begins to physically change her abilities around episode 10 of the first season, giving her "a second manifestation" of her powers. Additionally, in the series there is "some awareness" that Polaris is the daughter of Magneto, which Nix said would lead to the question "does she accept the mantle of her birthright? Is it her job to be Magneto in his absence?" The first season finale builds to this, with Polaris having to decide between the more extreme views of Magneto and those of the underground, particularly Eclipse.

The premiere of season two establishes her abilities as being permanently altered by the pregnancy, causing a city-wide electrical power surge while giving birth to her baby, which she names "Dawn".

=== Frost sisters ===
The Frost sisters (portrayed by Skyler Samuels) are telepathic sisters—Esme, Sophie and Phoebe—with their own agenda, separate from those of the mutant underground, Sentinel Services, and Trask Industries; the surviving three of identical quintuplets, their deceased sisters being Celeste and Mindee. They are based on the Stepford Cuckoos comic book characters.

Samuels was revealed to have joined the series as Esme in November 2017, soon said to be a "key recurring role" for the series. Esme was revealed to be one of the Frost siblings, with Samuels also portraying her sisters Phoebe and Sophie. By January 2018, Samuels was being considered for promotion to a series regular for the show's second season, and she stated that her characters would be appearing more in the second season than the first either way. She was confirmed as a series regular in June.

Samuels' hair and wardrobe was designed as an homage to the comics, though the series' portrayal of the sisters deviates from the comics in some ways; the Esme character in the comics was one of two sisters who died before there were the three Stepford Cuckoos. Because the three characters are often dressed identically, Samuels tried to differentiate them through behavior and how they each talk. The effect of the three characters together was created with a mixture of effects: split-screening, green-screening, and face replacements over doubles when Samuels worked with two other actresses portraying the other sisters.

=== Reeva Payge ===
Reeva Payge (portrayed by Grace Byers) is a member of the 'Inner Circle' and has an elite band of followers.

Byers was cast in the role in June 2018.

Reeva is an incredibly powerful mutant and becomes the leader of the Hellfire Club after she uses her powers to neutralise the other members of the Inner Circle while the Frost sisters shoot them dead. Her abilities allow her to emit a high frequency from her vocal cords that can scramble minds. It can cause Mutants to lose control of their powers, even causing them to hurt themselves. Reeva establishes herself as a firm mother-figure to Lorna and Andy and helps ensure that the former's newborn baby is cured of a rare disease to ensure Polaris's properly motivated for her grand goals. While she has been shown to be affectionate toward the Frost Sisters, she is very ruthless and unforgiving, having killed her own comrades to ensure her vision for mutantkind is successful. She states to Andy that she will do anything to see her goal succeed. Reeva has ordered the deaths of several humans to keep the Inner Circle's proceedings are kept secret and even considers killing Andy for being indecisive about joining the Inner Circle as she perceives a mutant as powerful as he is with the underground a threat, but then proceeds to change her mind and encourage Andy in a more motherly fashion. Reeva and the Frost Sisters share a close relationship but even they are afraid to voice opposing opinions in her presence.

It is later revealed that although she appears to be a villain, Reeva was in fact an advocate for equality in her community eight years ago before a close friend was attacked and murdered in the street before her eyes. Present day she dates and loves a human man, Quinn, although she is secretly using him for the betterment of her goals as well. Reeva is shocked when one of her newer underlings, Twist, kills Quinn and several humans in a grotesque display of madness.

== Recurring characters ==
=== Introduced in season one ===
==== Teresia Karisik / Sage ====
Teresia Karisik (portrayed by Hayley Lovitt) is a mutant with accelerated perception and superhuman intelligence who goes by Sagethat can do complex calculations. The character is portrayed as a "creature of logic" in the series, and is often shown working with computers. She decides to leave the mutant underground to join the Hellfire Club in the first season finale, which Nix felt was her logical side overcoming any personal feelings that she has to assess the situation and align with the side more likely to survive.

==== Ed Weeks ====
Edward "Ed" Weeks (portrayed by Joe Nemmers) is a Sentinel Services agent who works with Turner.

==== Fade ====
Fade (portrayed by Jeff Daniel Phillips) is a mutant bartender with the ability to make anyone, including himself, invisible.

==== Shatter ====
Shatter (portrayed by Jermaine Rivers) is a mutant who can turn his skin into a hard, protective crystal.

==== Roderick Campbell ====
Roderick Campbell (portrayed by Garret Dillahunt) is a mutant researcher contracted by Sentinel Services, who is on a "morally dubious" mission. In September 2017, Dillahunt joined the series in the "key recurring role" of Campbell. Nix compared the series' adaptation of the comic character to the changes made when adapting the character William Stryker for the X-Men films.

==== Sonya Simonson / Dreamer ====
Sonya Simonson (portrayed by Elena Satine) is a mutant who can "add or subtract" others' memories, and also goes by the name Dreamer. Satine was revealed in August 2017 to have been cast in the series as Dreamer, to first appear in the second episode.

==== Paula Turner ====
Paula Turner (portrayed by Frances Turner) is an attorney and Jace Turner's wife. She tries to find normalcy following the death of their daughter Grace.

==== Mark / Bulk ====
Mark (portrayed by Renes Rivera) is a mutant with superhuman strength who also goes by the name Bulk. He was a member of the mutant underground before switching allegiances and joining the Hellfire Club following the destruction of the mutant underground headquarters.

==== Evangeline Whedon ====
Evangeline Whedon (portrayed by Erinn Ruth) is an attorney who recruited Polaris, and later Thunderbird, for the underground on behalf of the X-Men.

=== Introduced in season two ===
==== Ted Wilson ====
Officer Ted Wilson (portrayed by Tom O'Keefe) is a police officer at the Metropolitan Police Department and the leader of a Purifiers cell in Washington, D.C. He later recruits Jace into the Purifiers.

==== Erg ====
Erg (portrayed by Michael Luwoye) is the leader of the Morlocks, and mutant separatist who believes mutantkind should not coexist with regular humans. Erg's ability is absorbing and redirecting energy through his left eye hole.

==== Rebecca Hoover / Twist ====
Twist (portrayed by Anjelica Bette Fellini) is a sociopathic mutant with the ability to telekinetically twist and turn things inside out. She was a psychiatric patient named Rebecca Hoover before the Inner Circle liberated her in order to utilize her gifts in their overall plans. She goes on to develop a kinship and bond with Andy Strucker until he unintentionally killed her during her attempt to massacre the Inner Circle.

==== Benedict Ryan ====
Benedict Ryan (portrayed by Peter Gallagher) is a popular TV news host, an anti-mutant advocate and secretly a big supporter of the Purifiers. Showrunner Matt Nix explicitly based the portrayal of Benedict Ryan on Fox News commentator Sean Hannity.

==== Glow ====
Glow (portrayed by Laysla De Oliveira) is a mutant with the ability to unleash glowing light orbs and a member of the Morlocks. She has the mutant ability to unleash non-dangerous softball-sized glowing light orbs from her hands that she can then mentally control, levitating them anywhere within her line of sight.

==== Kyle ====
Kyle (portrayed by Lowrey Brown) is a member of the Purifiers.

==== Max ====
Max (portrayed by James Carpinello) is a mutant hitman whose team is currently in the employ of The Inner Circle. Max possesses the ability to charge any object with a degree of explosive energy.

==== Tico ====
Tico (portrayed by Tyshon Freeman) is a mutant hitman whose team is currently in the employ of The Inner Circle. Tico possesses the ability to create shockwaves.

==== Heather ====
Heather (portrayed by Chelle Ramos) is a mutant hitman whose team is currently in the employ of The Inner Circle. Heather possesses the ability to teleport objects.

== Guest characters ==
=== Introduced in season one ===
- Grace Turner (portrayed by Jaxon Rose Moore): Jace Turner's deceased daughter and the catalyst behind his joining the Sentinel Services.
- Pedro (portrayed by Dinarte de Freitas): A light-blue, leonine mutant who can "project fear".
- Ellen Strucker (portrayed by Sharon Gless): Reed's mother.
- Daniel (portrayed by Jeffrey Nordling): Caitlin's brother.
- Carmen Guerra (portrayed by Michelle Veintimilla): Diaz's ex-girlfriend and the leader of a cartel.
- Gus / Pulse (portrayed by Zach Roerig): A mutant who can disable electrical systems and other mutants' abilities. He is loyal to Sentinel Services under the Hound Program.
- Trader (portrayed by D James Jones): A mutant who can cloud other's vision to hide.
- Wes (portrayed by Danny Ramirez): A mutant who can create illusions, whom Lauren grows close to.
- Andrew Benator portrays Campbell's aide, a Hound.
- Naya (portrayed by Jessi Goei): A young mutant living with the underground that can control water.
- Skyler (portrayed by Charlie Nix): A young mutant living with the underground who can repel objects.
- Otto Strucker (portrayed by Raymond J. Barry): Reed's estranged father.
- Andreas and Andrea von Strucker / Fenris (portrayed by Paul Cooper and Caitlin Mehner, respectively): Ancestors of Lauren and Andy with the same mutant abilities. Nix stated that giving the series' main characters the surname "Strucker", a name given to notable characters from the comics, was an intentional decision, leading to speculation that Lauren and Andy were an adaptation of the Strucker twins. After the series included an Easter egg referring to characters that matched the comics description of the twins, Lind indicated that those characters could appear themselves. In November 2017, the characters were officially confirmed to be appearing in the show, with Cooper and Mehner cast as Andreas and Andrea, respectively.
- Montez (portrayed by David Noroña): An anti-mutant senator.
- Wolcott (portrayed by Elliot Grey): The Director of Sentinel Services.
- Jack Campbell (portrayed by Alex Collins): Roderick Campbell's brother, who died from cystic fibrosis.
- Stan Lee makes a cameo appearance in the pilot.
