= Ant-Man (film) =

2015 Marvel Studios film

- Theatrical release poster
- Directed by: Peyton Reed
- Screenplay by: Edgar Wright; Joe Cornish; Adam McKay; Paul Rudd
- Story by: Edgar Wright; Joe Cornish
- Based on: Ant-Man by: Stan Lee; Larry Lieber; Jack Kirby
- Produced by: Kevin Feige
- Starring: Paul Rudd; Evangeline Lilly; Corey Stoll; Bobby Cannavale; Michael Peña; Tip "T.I." Harris; Anthony Mackie; Wood Harris; Judy Greer; Abby Ryder Fortson; David Dastmalchian; Michael Douglas
- Cinematography: Russell Carpenter
- Edited by: Dan Lebental; Colby Parker Jr.
- Music by: Christophe Beck
- Production company: Marvel Studios
- Distributed by: Walt Disney Studios Motion Pictures
- Release dates: June 29, 2015 (Dolby Theatre); July 17, 2015 (United States)
- Running time: 117 minutes
- Country: United States
- Language: English
- Budget: $130–169.3 million
- Box office: $519.3 million

Ant-Man is a 2015 American superhero film based on the Scott Lang and Hank Pym incarnations of the Marvel Comics character Ant-Man. Produced by Marvel Studios and distributed by Walt Disney Studios Motion Pictures, it is the 12th film in the Marvel Cinematic Universe (MCU). The film was directed by Peyton Reed from a screenplay by the writing teams of Edgar Wright & Joe Cornish and Adam McKay & Paul Rudd. It stars Rudd as Scott Lang / Ant-Man alongside Evangeline Lilly, Corey Stoll, Bobby Cannavale, Michael Peña, Tip "T.I." Harris, Anthony Mackie, Wood Harris, Judy Greer, Abby Ryder Fortson, David Dastmalchian, and Michael Douglas as Hank Pym. In the film, Lang must help defend Pym's Ant-Man shrinking technology and plot a heist with worldwide ramifications.

Development of Ant-Man began in April 2006 with the hiring of Wright to direct and co-write with Cornish. By April 2011, Wright and Cornish had completed three drafts of the script and Wright shot test footage for the film in July 2012. Pre-production began in October 2013 after being put on hold so that Wright could complete The World's End. Casting began in December 2013, with the hiring of Rudd to play Lang. In May 2014, Wright left the project citing creative differences, though he still received screenplay and story credits with Cornish. The following month, Reed was brought in to replace Wright, while McKay was hired to contribute to the script with Rudd. Filming took place between August and December 2014 in San Francisco and Metro Atlanta.

Ant-Man held its world premiere at the Dolby Theatre in Hollywood, Los Angeles, on June 29, 2015, and was released in the United States on July 17, as the final film in Phase Two of the MCU. It grossed more than $519 million worldwide and received positive reviews from critics, who generally welcomed the film's smaller stakes than other MCU films, as well as its cast (particularly Rudd, Peña, Lilly, and Douglas), humor, and visual effects. Two sequels have been released: Ant-Man and the Wasp (2018) and Ant-Man and the Wasp: Quantumania (2023).

== Plot ==
In 1989, scientist Hank Pym resigns from S.H.I.E.L.D. after discovering their attempt to replicate his Ant-Man shrinking technology. Believing the technology would be dangerous if replicated, Pym vows to hide it for as long as he lives. In the present day, (Note: The events of the film are set in mid-2015, according to the book The Marvel Cinematic Universe: An Official Timeline (2023), following the events of Avengers: Age of Ultron (2015).) Pym's estranged daughter, Hope van Dyne, and former protégé, Darren Cross, have forced him out of his company, Pym Technologies. Cross is close to perfecting a shrinking suit of his own, the Yellowjacket, which horrifies Pym.

Upon his release from prison, well-meaning thief Scott Lang moves in with his old cellmate, Luis. Lang visits his daughter Cassie unannounced and is chastised by his former wife Maggie and her police-detective fiancé, Paxton, for not providing child support. Unable to hold down a job because of his criminal record, Lang agrees to join Luis's crew and commit a burglary. Lang breaks into a house and cracks its safe, but only finds what he believes to be an old motorcycle suit, which he takes home. After trying the suit on, Lang accidentally shrinks himself to the size of an insect. Terrified by the experience, he returns the suit to the house but is arrested on the way out. Pym, the homeowner, visits Lang in jail and smuggles the suit into his cell to help him break out.

Pym, who manipulated Lang through an unknowing Luis into stealing the suit as a test, wants Lang to become the new Ant-Man to steal the Yellowjacket from Cross. Having been spying on Cross after discovering his intentions, Hope and Pym train Lang to fight and to control ants. While Hope harbors resentment towards Pym about her mother Janet's death, he reveals that Janet, known as the Wasp, disappeared into a subatomic Quantum Realm while disabling a Soviet nuclear missile in 1987. Pym warns Lang that he could suffer a similar fate if he overrides his suit's regulator. They send him to steal a device from the Avengers' headquarters that will aid their heist, where he briefly fights Sam Wilson.

Cross perfects the Yellowjacket and hosts an unveiling ceremony at Pym Technologies' headquarters. Lang, along with his crew and a swarm of flying ants, infiltrates the building during the event, sabotages the company's servers, and plants explosives. When he attempts to steal the Yellowjacket, he, along with Pym and Hope, is captured by Cross, who intends to sell both the Yellowjacket and Ant-Man suits to Hydra. Lang breaks free and he and Hope dispatch most of the Hydra agents, though one flees with a vial of Cross's particles and Pym is shot. Lang pursues Cross, while the explosives detonate, imploding the building as Pym and Hope escape.

Cross dons the Yellowjacket and attacks Lang. During the fight, Lang is arrested by Paxton, and Cross takes Cassie hostage to lure them back. Lang overrides the regulator and shrinks to subatomic size to penetrate Cross's suit and sabotage it to shrink uncontrollably, seemingly killing Cross. Lang disappears into the Quantum Realm but manages to reverse the effects and returns to the macroscopic world. Out of gratitude for Lang's heroism, Paxton covers for Lang to keep him out of prison. Seeing that Lang survived and returned from the Quantum Realm, Pym wonders if his wife is also alive. Later, Lang meets up with Luis, who tells him that Wilson is looking for him.

In a mid-credits scene, Pym shows Hope a new Wasp prototype suit and offers it to her. In a post-credits scene, Steve Rogers and Wilson have Bucky Barnes in their custody. Unable to contact Tony Stark because of "the accords", (Note: As depicted in Captain America: Civil War (2016)) Wilson mentions that he knows someone who can help.

== Cast ==
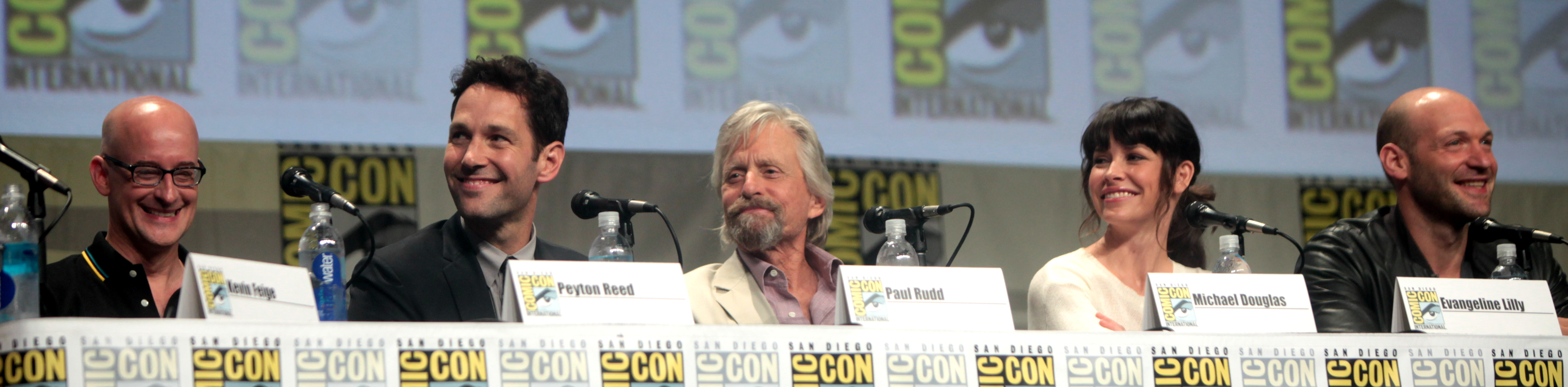
(L-R) Peyton Reed (director), Paul Rudd, Michael Douglas, Evangeline Lilly, and Corey Stoll at the 2014 San Diego Comic-Con

- Paul Rudd as Scott Lang / Ant-Man:
  A former systems engineer at VistaCorp and petty criminal who acquires a suit that allows him to shrink in size but increase in strength. Regarding Rudd's casting, producer Kevin Feige said, "Look at that origin of the petty crook who comes into contact with a suit and does his best to make good, and then look at someone like Paul Rudd, who can do slightly unsavory things like break into people's houses and still be charming and who you root for and whose redemption you will find satisfaction in". Director Peyton Reed compared Lang to George Clooney's character Danny Ocean from Ocean's Eleven (2001), saying, "He's a guy trying to create a new life for himself and find redemption." To get in shape for the role, Rudd worked with trainers and cut alcohol, fried foods, and carbohydrates out of his diet. Rudd stated that in preparation for his role, he "basically didn't eat anything for about a year ... I took the Chris Pratt approach to training for an action movie. Eliminate anything fun for a year and then you can play a hero". Rudd signed a multi-film contract with Marvel Studios, with Feige saying it was "three [films]-plus-plus to appear in other things".
- Evangeline Lilly as Hope van Dyne:
  The daughter of Hank Pym and Janet van Dyne and senior board member of Pym Technologies who helps Darren Cross take over the company. Throughout the film, character progression brings Hope closer to becoming a hero. Lilly described her character as "capable, strong, and kick-ass", but said that being raised by two superheroes resulted in Hope being "a pretty screwed up human being... and the clear message sent by my name is that I'm not a big fan of my father and so I took my mother's name". She added that Van Dyne's "arc in the movie is trying to find a relationship" with Pym. Originally cast by former director Edgar Wright, Lilly was reluctant to take the role after he left the project until she read the revised script and got a chance to meet with Reed. Feige said that Van Dyne was the more obvious choice to take up the mantle of Ant-Man, being "infinitely more capable of actually being a superhero" than Lang, and that the reason she does not is because of Pym's experience with losing her mother, rather than sexism, which Feige felt would not be a problem for Pym in modern times. Lilly signed a multi-film contract with Marvel.
- Corey Stoll as Darren Cross / Yellowjacket:
  A former protégé of Pym's who takes over his mentor's company and militarizes a similar version of the Ant-Man technology to create the Yellowjacket suit. Stoll described the suit as "the next generation of Ant-Man's suit", with a sleeker, more militaristic look as "if Apple had designed a battle suit." As for his character, Stoll said that Cross was more like Hank Pym than "Thanos or Loki, who are villains that know it", since Cross is a "brilliant scientist, who is not ethically pure" with shades of gray. Unlike Rudd, who wore a practical costume as Ant-Man, Stoll wore a motion capture suit while performing as Yellowjacket. Reed explained that this decision was made early on when creating and filming with a real Yellowjacket costume was found to be impractical.
- Bobby Cannavale as Jim Paxton:
  A San Francisco Police Department officer who is engaged to Lang's former wife Maggie. Cannavale stated that Rudd and McKay convinced him to join the film during the rewriting process before Marvel approached him, saying, "They sort of pumped [my] part up a bit...I really went on good faith [taking the role] because they're so secretive [at Marvel] about the script. I just trusted them." He also added that the process felt like an indie film instead of a large-scale blockbuster, and that he was able to improvise frequently along with the other actors. Patrick Wilson was originally cast in the role, before leaving the film because of scheduling conflicts brought on by the filming delay.
- Michael Peña as Luis:
  Lang's former cellmate and member of his crew. Peña stated that he modeled Luis's vocal style and positive outlook on life "on a friend of a friend", saying, "That's just the way he talks and the cadence. He's got this grin on the entire time and he doesn't care. He's the kind of guy where you're like 'Hey, what'd you do this weekend?' and he's like 'I went to jail, dawg,' with a smile on his face. Not a lot of people do that. Not a lot of people think of life on those terms." Peña signed a contract with Marvel for three films.
- Tip "T.I." Harris as Dave:
  A member of Lang's crew. Harris described Dave as Lang's "homeboy". Harris also revealed that he was not permitted to read the entire script, explaining "You're just handed scenes as the film [went] along, and when you do that, it's like a blank canvas, 'This is what I'm going to do for this scene,' and you can remember previous performances and remain consistent with that. The energy created by the ensemble you have around you, it contributes to the outlook or the final view of what your character has become, and what he meant to the story."
- Anthony Mackie as Sam Wilson / Falcon:
  An Avenger who is a former pararescueman trained by the military in aerial combat using a specially designed wing pack. On including Falcon, Reed said that it was not done just to include the character, rather "[i]t served a plot point; a purpose in our story" and allowed them to enhance Peña's "tip montages", which were written by production writers Gabriel Ferrari and Andrew Barrer, also adding Falcon "seemed like the right character — not a marquee character like Iron Man or Thor, but the right level of hero." Rudd and McKay decided to include Falcon after watching Captain America: The Winter Soldier (2014).
- Wood Harris as Gale: A police officer and Paxton's partner.
- Judy Greer as Maggie: Lang's estranged former wife.
- Abby Ryder Fortson as Cassie Lang: Scott and Maggie's daughter.
- David Dastmalchian as Kurt:
  A member of Lang's crew. Dastmalchian, who is American, worked with actress Isidora Goreshter to learn how to speak in his character's Russian accent. On his character, Dastmalchian said that he "had this idea that Kurt was born and raised in a town even further out than Siberia and he was just an amazing computer wizard who fell in with the wrong people. But he was obsessed with two things: Saturday Night Fever (1977) and Elvis Presley, hence the polyester shirts unbuttoned too far and the hair in that pompadour." Dastmalchian later stated that the character's last name was Goreshter, as a tribute to the actress.
- Michael Douglas as Hank Pym:
  A former S.H.I.E.L.D. agent, entomologist, and physicist who became the original Ant-Man in 1963 after discovering the subatomic particles that make the transformation possible. He later mentors Lang to take over the role. Douglas compared his decision to join a superhero film to his role in Behind the Candelabra (2013), saying, "Sometimes—like [when] they didn't see you for Liberace—you've got to shake them up a little bit and have some fun." Describing Pym, Douglas said, "He's sort of a Northern California, formal guy. He's lost control of his company. He lives in sort of a time warp. He was always a bit of a tinkerer. He's got a lab, plus a lot of other stuff, in his basement that we find out about. He's certainly bitter about what happened with his company and deeply scared of what the future might hold—because he himself, after having gotten small so many times, it's difficult. He looks and tries to find a guy that he can work with and has the right characteristics, which is [Scott]." Douglas indicated that he would not be wearing the Ant-Man suit.

Additionally, John Slattery and Hayley Atwell reprise their roles as Howard Stark and Peggy Carter, respectively, from previous MCU media. Slattery stated that his involvement in Ant-Man was "not that much more" than his participation in Iron Man 2 (2010), while Atwell described her appearance as being "more of a cameo". Gregg Turkington appears as Dale, the manager of a Baskin-Robbins store; and Martin Donovan plays Mitchell Carson, a former member of S.H.I.E.L.D. who works for Hydra and looks to purchase the Yellowjacket technology. YouTuber Anna Akana portrays a writer in Luis's story at the end of the film. Garrett Morris, who portrayed Ant-Man in a Saturday Night Live sketch in the 70s, appears as a taxi driver. Ant-Man co-creator Stan Lee makes a cameo appearance in the film as a bartender. Chris Evans and Sebastian Stan make uncredited appearances during the post-credits scene as Steve Rogers and Bucky Barnes, respectively. Hayley Lovitt makes a nonspeaking cameo as a younger Janet van Dyne / Wasp in a flashback. Lovitt was cast for her "saucer-like, Michelle Pfeiffer eyes", since Pfeiffer was Reed's dream casting for Wasp; Pfeiffer would later be cast as the character for the sequel Ant-Man and the Wasp (2018). Tom Kenny provides the voice of a toy rabbit that Scott gives to Cassie. Comedian Tom Scharpling portrayed someone selling a lottery ticket to Lang, in a scene that was cut from the theatrical release.

== Production ==
=== Development ===
Development of an Ant-Man film began as early as the late 1980s, when Ant-Man co-creator Stan Lee had pitched the idea to New World Pictures, Marvel Comics' parent company at the time. However, Walt Disney Pictures was developing Honey, I Shrunk the Kids (1989), a film based on a similar concept, and although Ant-Man went into development, nothing came to fruition. In 2000, Howard Stern met with Marvel in an attempt to purchase the film rights to Ant-Man. In May of that year, Artisan Entertainment announced a deal with Marvel to co-produce, finance, and distribute a film based on Ant-Man. In 2003, Edgar Wright and Joe Cornish wrote a treatment for Artisan. Wright said it had Scott Lang as a burglar "so he could have gone slightly in the Elmore Leonard route", though Artisan wanted the film to be "like a family thing". However, Wright believed that the treatment was never sent to Marvel. The film rights to Ant-Man reverted to Marvel following Lionsgate's purchase of Artisan at the end of 2003. In 2004, the duo pitched the film to Marvel Studios' then head of production, Kevin Feige. In April 2006, Marvel Studios hired Wright to direct and co-write Ant-Man with Cornish as part of its first slate of independently produced films. Wright would also co-produce with his Big Talk Productions partner Nira Park.

"The thing I like about Ant-Man is that it's not like a secret power, there's no supernatural element or it's not a genetic thing. There's no gamma rays. It's just like the suit and the gas, so in that sense, it really appealed to me in terms that we could do something high-concept, really visual, cross-genre, sort of an action and special effects bonanza, but funny as well."

— Screenwriter Edgar Wright

At the 2006 San Diego Comic-Con, Wright said he was intrigued by the story's high concept and character. Wright also stressed that the film would not be a spoof but an action-adventure with some comedic elements and would incorporate both the Hank Pym and Scott Lang incarnations of the character. Wright said that he was looking to "do a prologue where you see Pym as Ant-Man in action in the 60s, in sort of Tales to Astonish mode basically, and then the contemporary, sort of flash-forward, is Scott Lang's story, and how he comes to acquire the suit, how he crosses paths with Hank Pym, and then, in an interesting sort of Machiavellian way, teams up with him." The next February, Wright said that the project was in "a holding pattern" while the script was being revised, and that he had been doing research for the film by studying nanotechnology. In March 2008, Wright said that the first draft of the script had been completed and he was working on the second.

Stan Lee tweeted in February 2010 that Marvel was prepping the film and that he met with Wright for lunch to discuss the character. Wright noted that there was no timetable for the film because Marvel did not consider the character to be one of their bigger, tentpole properties, so "It's more like me and Kevin Feige saying...'Let's make a good script that works, that's all about a great genre film, and that isn't necessarily relying on anything else'". At the 2010 San Diego Comic-Con, Wright remarked that because his film would be an origin story and would not be released until after The Avengers (2012), the first Avengers film would not include Ant-Man, although Wright acknowledged that the character might appear in future Avengers films. In January 2011, Wright stated that he had resumed writing the script for the film following the conclusion of the international promotion for Scott Pilgrim vs. the World (2010), and by April he and Cornish delivered the second draft of Ant-Man to Marvel. At the 2011 San Diego Comic-Con, Wright said a third draft had been handed in.

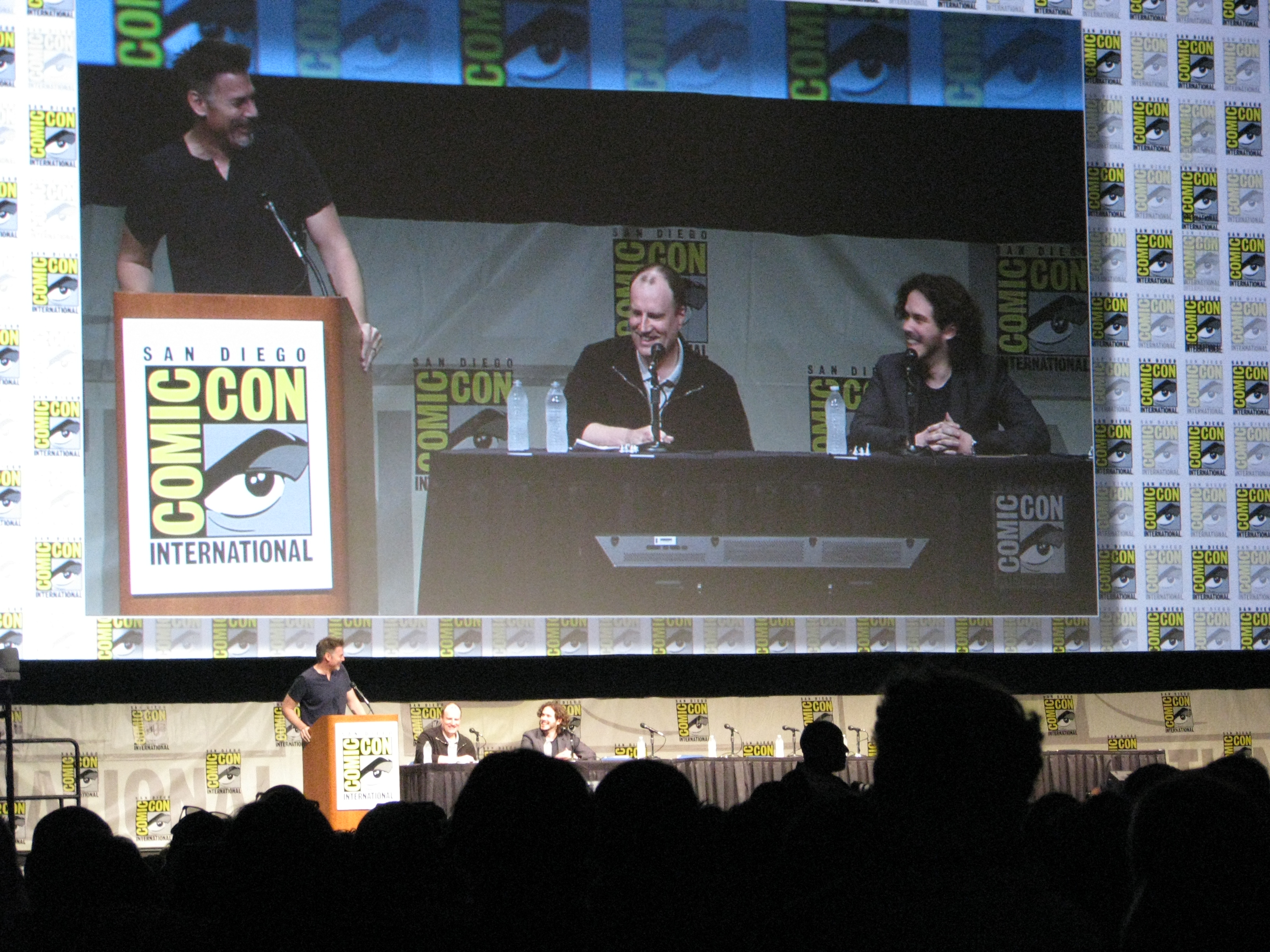
(L-R) moderator Geoff Boucher, producer Kevin Feige and original director Edgar Wright at the 2012 San Diego Comic-Con

In May 2012, Feige said that the project was "as close as it's ever been" while Wright teased the film by tweeting a pictogram of Ant-Man. In June, Wright spent just under a week shooting footage for a reel to test the potential look and tone and to decide how convincing Ant-Man's powers look on screen. The footage was screened to audiences during the Marvel Studios panel at the 2012 San Diego Comic-Con, with Wright confirming that Ant-Man would be happening. Germain Lussier of /Film felt the footage was "awesome", with "a totally different vibe from the other Marvel films", closer to Wright's film Hot Fuzz (2007). Lussier, along with Katey Rich of CinemaBlend, also enjoyed the costume design choice. That October, Disney scheduled the film for release on November 6, 2015.

Feige stated in January 2013 that Ant-Man would be part of Phase Three of the Marvel Cinematic Universe, and indicated in May that the screenplay needed to be modified in order to fit into the universe, as the project had been in development before the first Iron Man (2008) film. Feige also stated that shooting was slated to begin sometime in 2014, and that casting would begin towards the end of 2013. In July 2013, Wright said that he and Cornish had completed the script and that Marvel allowed him to delay its production so that he could complete The World's End, as that film's producer, Eric Fellner, had been diagnosed with cancer.

In August 2013, after Joss Whedon, director of Avengers: Age of Ultron (2015), announced that Hank Pym would not be Ultron's creator, Wright said Ultron was never a part of the story of Ant-Man, explaining that "just to sort of set up what Ant-Man does is enough for one movie". Wright described Ant-Man as a standalone film but said it would fit into the larger continuity of the Marvel Cinematic Universe, saying, "I like to make it standalone because I think the premise of it needs time. I want to put the crazy premise of it into a real world, which is why I think Iron Man really works because it's a relatively simple universe; it's relatable. I definitely want to go into finding a streamlined format where you use the origin format to introduce the main character and further adventures can bring other people into it". Wright also stated that pre-production for Ant-Man would begin in October and filming would begin in 2014. The next month, Disney moved the film's release date up to July 31, 2015.

=== Pre-production ===
In October 2013, Wright revealed that he was in Los Angeles to work on Ant-Man by tweeting a photograph from the production of the June 2012 test reel. Joseph Gordon-Levitt and Paul Rudd were soon being considered for the lead role, though Gordon-Levitt dismissed his consideration as a rumor. Feige stated that Ant-Man would be a "heist movie", and that a casting announcement for Hank Pym would come before the end of 2013. The next month, Feige stated that Eric O'Grady's Ant-Man would not be featured in the film, while Rudd became the front-runner to play Hank Pym, and casting for the character's girlfriend had begun. Around that time, the filmmakers' intentions to shoot in the United Kingdom were dashed because of a lack of studio space, which Wright believed was due to the plan by Pinewood Shepperton to add fifteen studios to their facility, which was rejected in part by the local council in May 2013 because the project was eyeing protected land. By the end of the month, the film was scheduled to be shot in the U.S. instead.

In December 2013, Wright, a fan of the Ant-Man comic book since childhood—owning copies of Tales to Astonish #27 featuring "The Man in the Ant-Hill" storyline and Marvel Premiere #47 featuring the first appearance of Scott Lang—stated that the difference between Ant-Man and other films featuring size-changing is "other shrinking movies are usually about somebody trapped small. This is different in that he can actually change size and he can do that at will, so it becomes more of a power than an impediment." Wright also talked about the challenge of directing a superhero film, saying, "Shaun and Hot Fuzz and World's End are all R-rated films. I like the challenge of making a PG-13 film. Because you've got to entertain in a different way. You don't have the same tools." By December 19, Rudd was in negotiations to star in the film, and Marvel announced that he had been cast as Ant-Man the next day.

In January 2014, Wright posted a screenshot on his blog from the Avengers: Earth's Mightiest Heroes (2010–2012) episode "To Steal an Ant-Man", which features Hank Pym and introduces the Scott Lang character, with the caption "homework". Michael Douglas was subsequently cast as Pym, with Rudd confirmed to play Lang. Michael Peña was offered an unspecified role in the film, and filming was scheduled to take place at Pinewood Atlanta Studios in Fayette County, Georgia, while Disney changed the release date once again, moving it to July 17, 2015. The next month, Evangeline Lilly entered early talks to portray the female lead, and Wright announced on his blog that Bill Pope, who he worked with on Scott Pilgrim vs. the World and The World's End, would be his director of photography. Bryce Dallas Howard and Rashida Jones were also considered for the female lead role, while Jessica Chastain passed on it. By March, Wright and Cornish turned in a fifth draft of the script, amid alleged disputes on the direction the script was taking. Wright and Cornish wrote a scene intended for the post-credits of Age of Ultron that would have acted as a prelude to the film. Corey Stoll entered negotiations for an undisclosed role in the film, and by April, Patrick Wilson and Matt Gerald were cast in undisclosed roles.

"Ant-Man is interesting because he was one of the original Avengers, which I think people forget about. So, I like that idea in the movie universe... I also like that it's this sort of passing of the torch. There's sort of a weird mentor / pupil thing happening between Michael Douglas' character Hank Pym and Scott Lang, which Paul Rudd plays. Hank Pym used to be old Ant-Man and he is trying to find someone to be the new Ant-Man. I like that. I think that's sort of a classic Marvel Comics thing and something that we really haven't seen in that universe."

— Peyton Reed, director of Ant-Man

On May 23, 2014, Marvel and Wright jointly announced that Wright was leaving the project due to "differences in their vision of the film", and that the studio was closing in on a new director. On the split, Wright said, "I wanted to make a Marvel movie but I don't think they really wanted to make an Edgar Wright movie." He said Marvel had wanted to do a draft of the script without him, which he found difficult, as he had written all of his previous films: "Suddenly becoming a director-for-hire on it, you're sort of less emotionally invested and you start to wonder why you're there, really." The majority of Wright's crew also left the project. Feige later stated that it was a "combination" of both creative differences and Wright's vision felt was "out-of-sync" for Marvel's wider universe.

By May 30, Adam McKay had entered negotiations to replace Wright, but he pulled out of negotiations the next day out of respect for Wright, who he was friends with. On June 7, Marvel announced that Peyton Reed would direct the film, with McKay contributing to the film's script; McKay felt this was the perfect result since he would not be replacing Wright, but was able to help Rudd, who he was also friends with. Other directors that had been under consideration include Ruben Fleischer, Rawson Marshall Thurber, Nicholas Stoller, Michael Dowse, and David Wain.

Later in June, Feige stated the film was still intended to be released on the July 17, 2015, date, with production slated to begin on August 18, 2014. Feige elaborated that "much of the movie will still be based very much on [Wright and Cornish's] draft and the DNA of what Edgar has created up to this point", with Reed stepping in to direct and McKay reworking only parts of the script. "[Reed] wanted to be sure that he wasn't just inheriting something or following someone else's lead. Or wasn't inheriting something that the evil studio had watered down to be something bad," Feige continued. "He looked at everything, he talked with us, and he said 'Number one, I agree with the direction you're going in. And number two, I can add to it.'"

McKay confirmed that Rudd helped him rewrite the script, calling Rudd "great with dialogue", adding "the two of us holed up in hotel rooms on the east and west coast, and I think it was like six to eight weeks we just ground it out and did a giant rewrite of the script. I was really proud of what we did, I really thought we put some amazing stuff in there and built on an already strong script from Edgar Wright and sort of just enhanced some stuff." Rudd elaborated, "The idea, the trajectory, the goal, and the blueprint of it all, is really Edgar and Joe. It's their story. We changed some scenes, we added new sequences, we changed some characters, we added new characters. If you took the two scripts and held them up together they'd be very different—but the idea is all theirs." Some additions to the film that had not been featured in Wright's version included a flashback sequence with Peggy Carter; Janet van Dyne; the Quantum Realm; and a fight with an Avenger. According to Reed, the Quantum Realm was the MCU's version of the microverse, which could not be called that for legal reasons. The alternate name was suggested by consultant Spiros Michalakis, a quantum physicist and staff researcher at the California Institute of Technology, to "inject elements of modern physics into the script". Reed also offered contributions to the revised script, as did Lilly and Stoll, who contributed ideas to help flesh out their respective characters. Lilly's character received a fuller arc and more action sequences as a result. One of the important things when joining the film for Reed was emphasizing both Hope and Janet van Dyne more, given the Wasp being "a crucial part" of the Ant-Man comics. For their efforts, McKay and Rudd were credited as additional writers of the screenplay, with Wright and Cornish credited for the screenplay and story. Wright also held an executive producer credit on the film.

By the end of July, Wilson left the film because of scheduling conflicts brought on by the filming delay, and characters being played by Gerald and Kevin Weisman were cut in McKay's revised script. Also, Reed indicated that in addition to Georgia, filming would take place in San Francisco. The next month, Reed revealed that Scott Lang's daughter would appear in the film, and Gabriel Ferrari and Andrew Barrer were hired to make further revisions to the script. Ferrari and Barrer were hired after Reed read their spec script Die in a Gunfight which Reed felt was "really interesting". Eric Pearson, a member of Marvel Studios' writing program who had written the Marvel One-Shot films, did uncredited work on the film as well, scripting the strip club scene and Stan Lee's cameo. After reading the revised script, Evangeline Lilly felt that the film was "pulled" more into the MCU than Wright's version which "was much more in the Edgar Wright camp of films." She added that, while Wright's version was "incredible" and would have been great to film and watch, "it wouldn't have fit in the Marvel Universe. It would have stuck out like a sore thumb, no matter how good it was. It just would have taken you away from this cohesive universe they're trying to create. And therefore it ruins the suspended disbelief that they've built." The character Arnim Zola, who was played by Toby Jones in Captain America: The First Avenger (2011) and Captain America: The Winter Soldier (2014) was considered to make an appearance in the film, with concept art created depicting him in his robot body from the comics. Reed said the costume design was influenced by Asian tokusatsu superheroes such as Ultraman and Inframan.

=== Filming ===
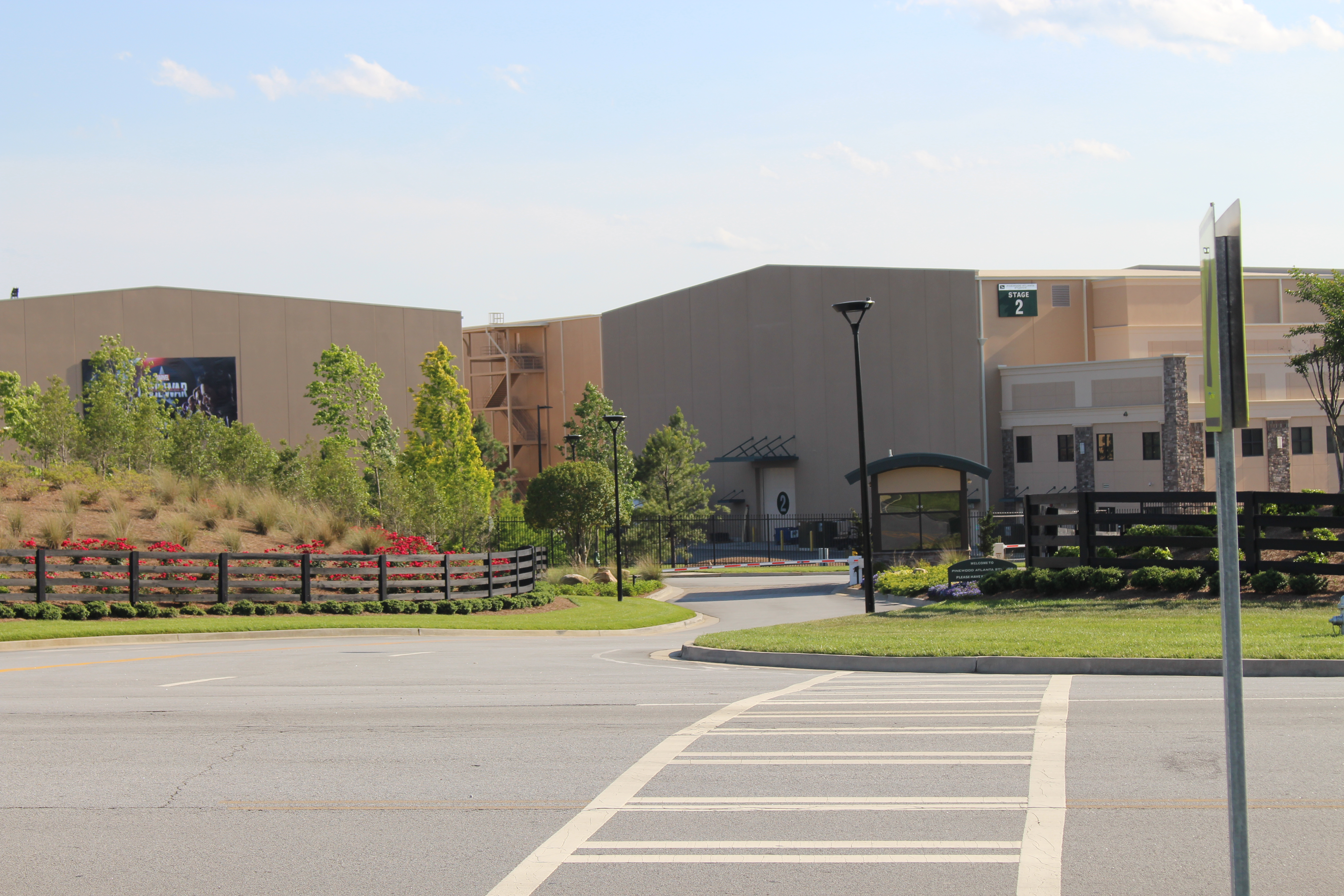
Ant-Man was the first production to be shot at Pinewood Atlanta Studios.

Principal photography began on August 18, 2014, in San Francisco, under the working title Bigfoot. Scenes were shot in the Tenderloin neighborhood and Buena Vista Park. By the end of September 2014, production on Ant-Man moved to Pinewood Atlanta Studios in Fayette County, Georgia, and David Callaham completed a rewrite of the film. Filming also took place at the State Archives building in Downtown Atlanta, to double as Pym Technologies, which is located on Treasure Island, San Francisco, in the film. In October 2014, Martin Donovan was added to the cast, and Feige revealed that Ant-Man would no longer start Phase Three of the Marvel Cinematic Universe and would instead be the final film of Phase Two. When told by /Film's Germain Lussier that this placement between Avengers: Age of Ultron and Captain America: Civil War (2016) made the film feel like an afterthought, Feige replied,

It's not [an after thought]. The truth is the phases mean a lot to me and some people but...Civil War is the start of Phase Three. It just is. And Ant-Man is a different kind of culmination of Phase Two because it very much is in the MCU. You meet new characters and you learn about Hank Pym and his lineage with the MCU over the years. But at the same time, it also picks up the thread of Age of Ultron in terms of heroes—major heroes, Avengers—coming from unexpected places... And in that way it connects a lot. Also, Hank Pym's attitude towards Avengers, towards S.H.I.E.L.D., and kind of the cinematic universe in general, is much more informed after the events of Age of Ultron, and in a certain way, before the events of Civil War.

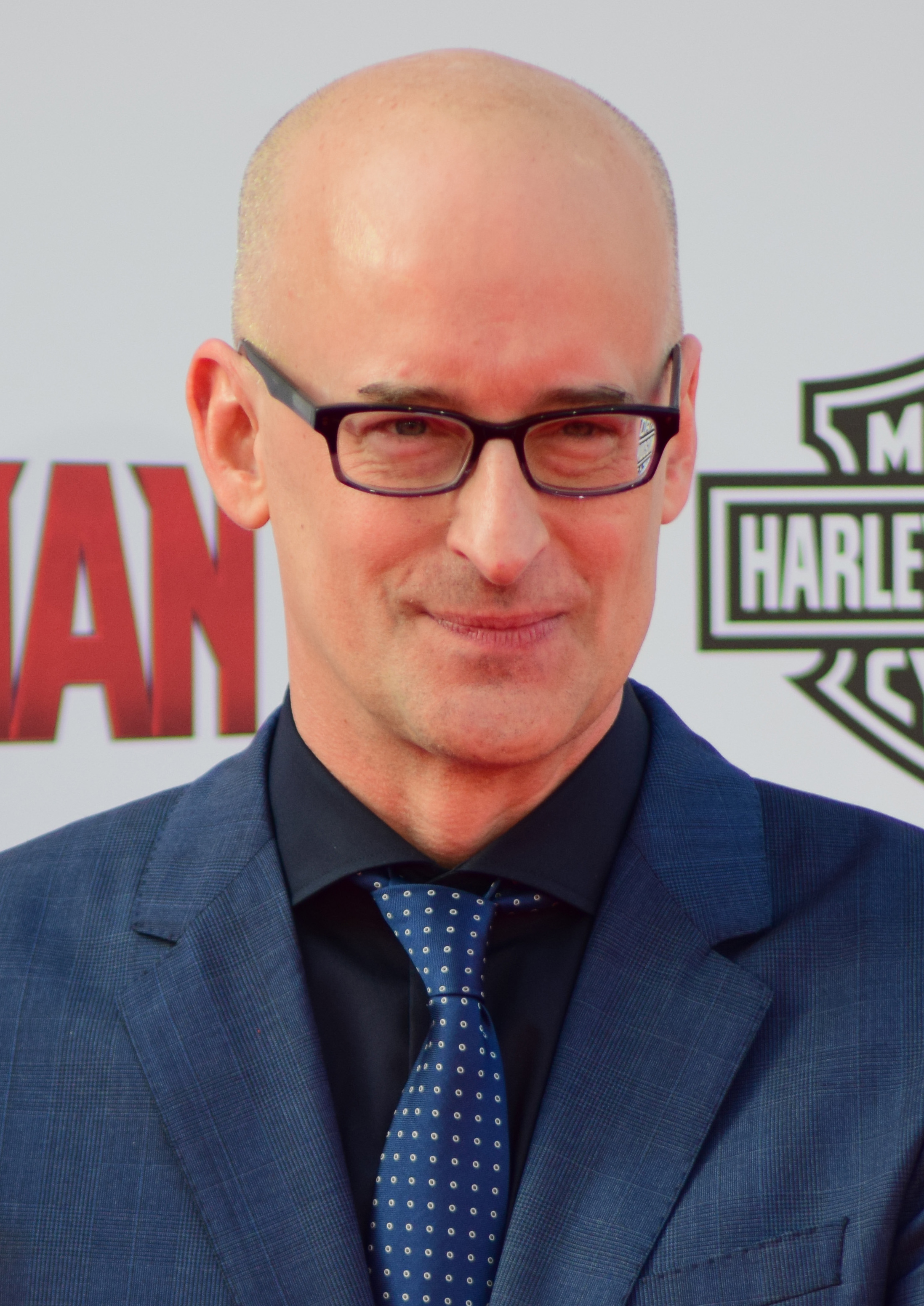
Reed at the world premiere of Ant-Man in Hollywood

Feige later expanded on this by saying, "[W]e put Ant-Man at the end of Phase Two as opposed to the beginning of Phase Three, because it sets up a lot of the things you're going to see heading into Phase Three, one of which is this mind-bending, reality-altering landscape [in Doctor Strange (2016)]." On December 5, 2014, Reed announced on social media that principal photography on Ant-Man had been completed.

For the film, cinematographer Russell Carpenter used a 1.85 aspect ratio shot with Arri Alexa XT and M cameras, using the M for fight sequences and helicopter filming. Camera operator Peter Rosenfeld said, "Russell and Peyton's decision to shoot in 1.85 was a good call, since at 2.39 there's insufficient height in frame to appreciate the vertical aspects of [Ant-Man] going from standing full-size to falling through a crack in the floor." Carpenter and Technicolor also devised a lookup table (LUT) to darken the color palette. Carpenter said, "For a lot of recent comedies I've kept my LUTs kind of 'Kodak' – saturated and upbeat. But this show needed something different that affected skin tones and the Ant-Man suit, which dates back to the 1980s, so it looks a little run-down. What I loved about this LUT was how it allowed the costume to retain the color but took it from fire-engine red to something a little more weathered."

The filmmakers made extensive use of macro photography. Production designer Shepherd Frankel said, "It's more visually interesting to depict things from Ant-Man's point of view instead of seeing him from a normal perspective. But we wanted a realistic realization, not Honey, I Shrunk the Kids with its oversized set pieces." Rebecca Baehler served as the director of macro photography, taking cues from Carpenter. Carpenter said vibration became "a tremendous problem" when moving the camera during the macro photography because "one inch off the ground is like fifteen feet in the air. From an ant's perspective, you move four inches, to a human perspective, that's a football field!" The filmmakers needed a creative solution, so they turned to Baehler, who had a background in commercial "tabletop" photography. In order to add Rudd's performance as Ant-Man when in the macro world, a Centroid facial motion-capture set-up was used, with a five-camera array of Alexas surrounding Rudd. Rosenfeld explained, "One camera was set up vertically while the others were horizontal with overlapping image areas, all set to record at 48 frames per second. This maximized resolution and provided 3D modeling [of] Paul's performance." Reed would then call out story moments with Rudd performing "facial expressions that would later be composited on a CG Ant-Man". Entomologist Steven Kutcher provided suggestions to the filmmakers on how to film live ants.

=== Post-production ===
Following the completion of principal photography, Marvel released an updated synopsis revealing that Jordi Mollà was included in the cast and the names of several supporting characters. However, Mollà subsequently did not appear in the theatrical release of the film. Reed explained that the film's original opening, which was filmed and cut in the editing process, featured a standalone sequence similar to the opening of a James Bond film, where an unseen Pym was attempting to retrieve some microfilm from Mollà's character, Castillo, a Panama army general. Reed stated the scene was going to show Ant-Man's powers, without seeing him, almost "like an Invisible Man sequence, and it's really, really cool. It started to feel tonally disconnected from the movie we were making and story-wise, and it also kind of like, it set a standalone adventure, but it didn't just connect to the rest of our story...It felt like vestige of those earlier drafts [by Wright and Cornish], which as a standalone thing was really cool." Dan Lebental and Colby Parker, Jr. served as film editors. In March 2015, Hayley Atwell confirmed that she would reprise her role as Peggy Carter in the film. William Sadler later said he had reprised his role of President Matthew Ellis from the film Iron Man 3 (2013) and the television series Agents of S.H.I.E.L.D. (2013-2020) for a cameo appearance in Ant-Man, but the scene was cut from the finished film. In April 2015, Reed stated that the film was not completed yet and would be undergoing "a little bit of additional" filming.

In June 2015, Feige confirmed that the character of Janet van Dyne would be seen, though the film would not address Pym and Van Dyne's infamous domestic abuse storyline in the comics, saying, "We hint at a temper in a way that people who know the stories might go, 'Oh, perhaps that's a bit of [Hank's] character,' but not in a way that would ever indicate [he beat his wife]." Also in the month, Reed confirmed there would be a post-credit sequence "that may tie into the other films." Feige revealed the post-credit sequence was footage shot by Anthony and Joe Russo for Civil War, saying the clip would be seen in that film, though it may be "different takes...different angles." On June 25, 2015, Reed announced on social media that production of Ant-Man was officially complete. In early July 2015, an international teaser trailer revealed that Anthony Mackie would appear in the film as Sam Wilson / Falcon. Mackie appears in the post-credit sequence as well, along with Chris Evans and Sebastian Stan as Steve Rogers / Captain America and Bucky Barnes / Winter Soldier, respectively. Stan stated the scene that was used for the post-credit sequence was shot in May 2015, and would appear in the middle of Civil War. Reed also said that the end of the film originally had a sequence where Ant-Man went after Carson to retrieve the stolen vial of Cross' particles, "... But then for a couple reasons, it felt like maybe we should leave those particles out there." For the title sequences, Marvel again went with design firm Sarofsky, who had done the credits for both The Winter Soldier and Guardians of the Galaxy (2014), with the credits "intricately connected to the film's overall narrative."

==== Visual effects ====
For Yellowjacket sequences, Stoll wore a motion capture suit while on set (top), which was replaced by an entirely digital creation built by Double Negative (bottom).

Visual effects for the film were provided by Industrial Light & Magic (ILM), Lola VFX, Double Negative, Luma Pictures, and Method Studios, with previsualization by The Third Floor. Double Negative handled the scenes featuring shrunken characters, incorporating the macro photography and motion capture performances shot in principal photography with digital models of the characters. Double Negative also worked on Ant-Man's shrinking effect, in coordination with ILM to be used by all vendors, which showed the outline of his body – an element from the comics. Visual effects supervisor Alex Wuttke said, "It's like a little time echo. As Ant-Man shrinks in almost a stop motion way he would leave behind outlines of the poses he'd been in as he shrinks down... We'd have two CG cameras rendering the action from different points along the timeline with slightly different framings. One would be the main shot camera, the other would be a utility camera that would provide renders of static poses of Ant-Man at different points along the timeline."

For the flashbacks in 1989, Douglas and Donovan appeared de-aged via CGI, alongside Atwell as Carter (aged in makeup and with CGI) and John Slattery as Howard Stark. To de-age Douglas, Lola VFX used a similar process and technology that was used to make Steve Rogers skinny in The First Avenger and Carter older in The Winter Soldier as well as footage of Douglas' other films from the late 1980s as reference. Dax Griffin served as Douglas' body double and an additional reference for Lola, because of his "striking resemblance of Michael when he was about 40". For Donovan, he only needed to be de-aged about a decade, so no double was used. The work on him focused on his eyes, neck, and chin. Atwell wore a wig on set, along with a fine layer of latex makeup to give the skin a more leathery look, with Lola transposing the facial features of an elderly actress onto her face.

Method and Luma both worked on creating the various ants seen in the film, with Method creating the several species of ants, to share among the vendors. Luma also handled many of the scenes at Pym Technologies when Ant-Man attempts to acquire the Yellowjacket. ILM worked on the Falcon fight sequence, having done Falcon visual effects in The Winter Soldier. Using practical suit pieces built by Legacy Effects, ILM mixed live-action shots with digital take-overs and fully digital shots to create the sequence. ILM also handled the sequences in the Quantum Realm, providing an array of microscopic and largely psychedelic imagery for the subatomic shrinking, taking advantage of procedural fractal rendering techniques the studio had utilized on Lucy (2014).

== Music ==
In February 2014, Wright announced that Steven Price would score the film. However, Price left soon after Wright's departure from the project in May 2014. In January 2015, Christophe Beck, who worked with Reed on Bring It On, was hired to replace Price. Describing the film's score, Beck said, "For Ant-Man, I wanted to write a score in the grand symphonic tradition of my favorite superhero movies, with a sweeping scope and a big, catchy main theme. What makes this score stand out among other Marvel movies, though, is a sneaky sense of fun since it is, after all, not only a superhero movie, but also a heist comedy." Hollywood Records released the soundtrack digitally on July 17, 2015, and had a physical release on August 7.

== Marketing ==
In March 2014, ABC aired a one-hour television special, Marvel Studios: Assembling a Universe, which included a sneak peek of Ant-Man. In July 2014, Reed, Rudd, Douglas, Lilly, and Stoll appeared at Marvel Studios' panel at the 2014 San Diego Comic-Con to help promote the film and screen a visual effects test featuring Rudd and Douglas. In October 2014, Marvel Comics' Editor-in-Chief Axel Alonso stated there are comic tie-in plans for the film. In November 2014, ABC aired another one-hour television special titled, Marvel 75 Years: From Pulp to Pop!, which featured behind the scenes footage of Ant-Man. Marvel Comics' February 2015 solicitations released in December 2014, revealed a two-issue comic tie-in, Marvel's Ant-Man Prelude, following Hank Pym as Ant-Man on a mission during the Cold War. A second comic tie-in, Marvel's Ant-Man—Scott Lang: Small Time, was released digitally on March 3, 2015. It explains Lang's circumstances at the beginning of the film. A virtual pinball based on the film was released on July 14, 2015, by Zen Studios.

In January 2015, Disney officially began the film's marketing campaign by releasing a miniature "ant-sized" teaser trailer, a full-sized version of the same teaser trailer, a poster, a cover on Entertainment Weekly, and a full-length trailer during the premiere of the television series Agent Carter. Scott Mendelson of Forbes, said, "It was darn-clever for Disney to put out a miniature 'can't see anything without a microscope' version of the now-standard trailer for the trailer. I sighed just a little when they 'gave in' and released a human-sized version, realizing that Disney had just released what amounted to a teaser to a teaser to a trailer... But nonetheless, credit where credit is due, Disney was able to turn a single theatrical trailer into three separate news drops in about five days." Mendelson went on to say that "the peppy, witty trailer above is a general audience sell. Marvel knows the geeks will come if only to throw stones, but it's the mainstream audience that needs to be sold. So far, so good." However, Graeme McMillan of The Hollywood Reporter criticized the trailer for its placement during the broadcast premiere of Agent Carter, its tone, its soundtrack, and for being thematically similar to other trailers from Marvel Studios. McMillan concluded, "The Ant-Man trailer isn't bad, per se; it is, however, impressively underwhelming, which almost seems worse. Thanks to the last-minute exit of original writer-director Edgar Wright and the subsequent struggle to find a replacement, Ant-Man has become the movie that people are expecting to be Marvel's first failure, in critical if not financial terms, at least; this trailer, which fails to convince and gets by on goodwill for those involved and the Marvel brand as much as anything else, doesn't do enough — or anything, really — to persuade audiences that that's not the case." The trailer generated 29 million views worldwide in three days, the third-largest viewership for a Marvel Studios film, behind trailers for Iron Man 3 and Avengers: Age of Ultron.

In April 2015, Marvel debuted a second trailer for Ant-Man. Mendelson said it was "frankly the Ant-Man trailer that we've been waiting for. It's not just funny and exciting, it's an 'Ah ha!' moment when we realize just what exactly an Ant-Man movie has to offer." Also in April, miniature billboards promoting Ant-Man with battery-powered LED lights began appearing in Melbourne, Brisbane and other areas around Queensland, Australia as part of a street marketing campaign for the film. The next month, Marvel, in partnership with Dolby Laboratories, Visa, and Raspberry Pi, announced the "Ant-Man Micro-Tech Challenge", aimed at females aged 14 through 18, to create DIY projects involving micro technology and readily accessible and found materials. Winners teamed with STEM (Science, Technology, Engineering, and Mathematics education) programs in their areas to lead teams in recreating their projects. In June, Marvel released posters featuring Ant-Man juxtaposed with Iron Man's armor, Captain America's shield, and Thor's hammer Mjolnir. Mendelson compared this to Disney's marketing campaign for Lilo & Stitch that put the protagonist into iconic scenes from other Disney cartoons. A six-minute IMAX preview of the film began screening before showings of Jurassic World, and scenes from the film were shown at Disney California Adventure's Bug's Life Theater in 3D with in-theater effects.

In early July 2015, Marvel began a viral marketing campaign featuring Leslie Bibb, reprising her role from the Iron Man films as journalist Christine Everhart, reporting for the faux news program WHIH Newsfront. In the program, Everhart discuses the fallout from the events of Avengers: Age of Ultron, Lang's imprisonment, and events leading to Captain America: Civil War. Also in July, Michael Douglas and executives from Marvel Entertainment rang the closing bell of the New York Stock Exchange in celebration of the release of Ant-Man. Disney spent $34.8 million on television advertising for the film, more than the $26.9 million spent for Avengers: Age of Ultron, since the former was a new property. In December 2015, to commemorate the home media release of Ant-Man, the 360 Company launched a website that offers visitors a view of various London landmarks from the perspective of an ant in a Google Street View–type experience. The company commissioned photographer Will Pearson to capture ten different locations including Tower Bridge, Oxford Circus, the British Museum, St Paul's Cathedral and Nelson's Column using a 360° miniature camera that sat centimeters off of the ground.

== Release ==
=== Theatrical ===
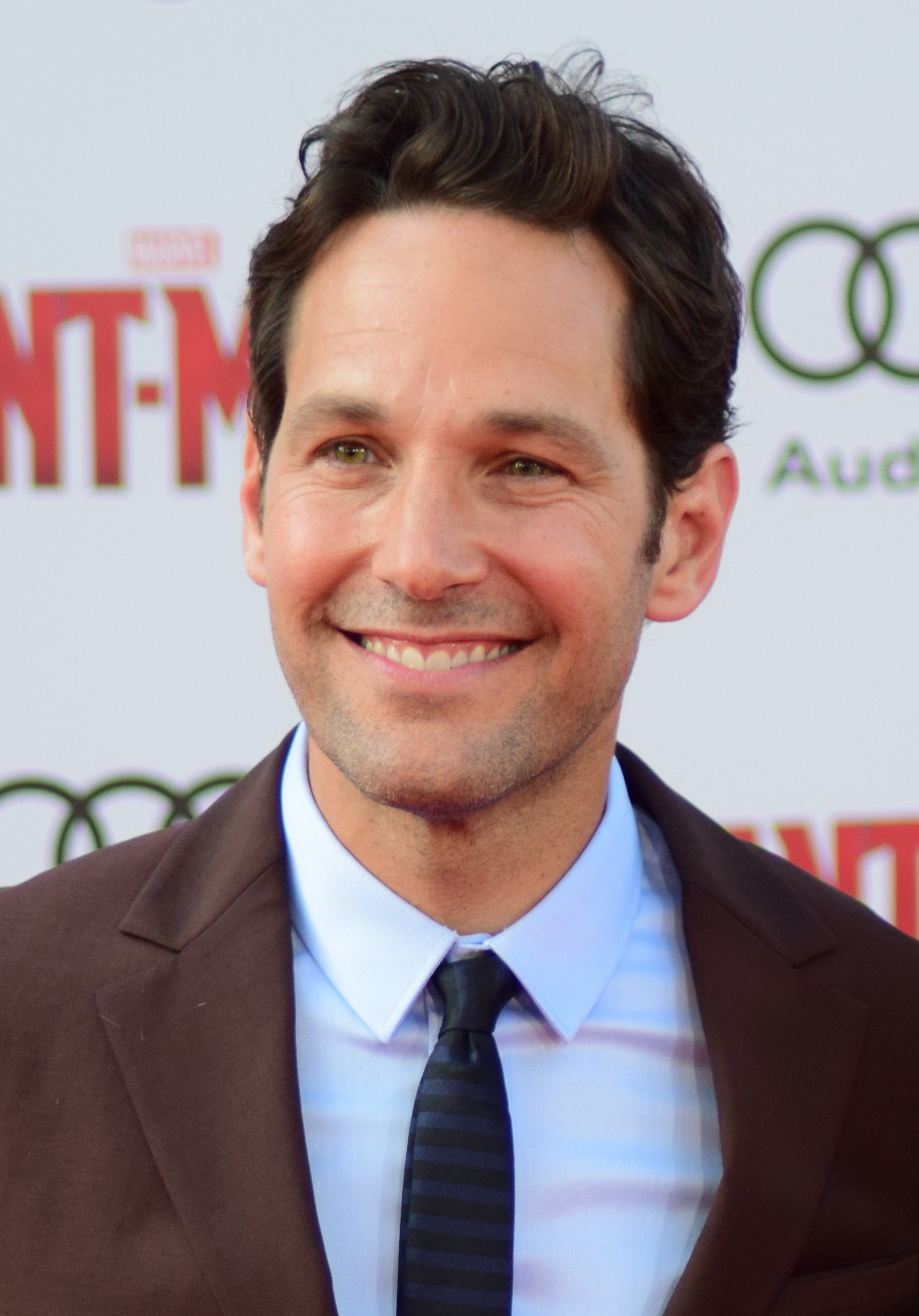
Rudd at the world premiere of Ant-Man in Hollywood, Los Angeles

Ant-Man premiered at the Dolby Theatre in Hollywood, Los Angeles, on June 29, 2015, and opened the 2015 Fantasia International Film Festival on July 14, 2015, along with Miss Hokusai. The film was released in France on July 14, and was released in North America on July 17, in 3D and IMAX 3D. The film was released in the United States in 3,800 theaters, with the breakdown of 3,100 3D screens, 361 IMAX screens, 388 large format screens and 133 D-Box screens. Ant-Man had originally been scheduled for release on November 6, 2015. In September 2013, the release was moved to July 31, 2015, before changing for a final time to July 17, 2015, in January 2014. An unfinished version of the film was screened on June 24, 2015, at CineEurope. Ant-Man was the last film released in Phase Two of the MCU.

=== Home media ===
Ant-Man was released for digital download by Walt Disney Studios Home Entertainment on November 17, 2015, and on Blu-ray, Blu-ray 3D, and DVD on December 8. The digital and Blu-ray releases include behind-the-scenes featurettes, audio commentary, deleted scenes, and a blooper reel. Upon its first week of release on home media in the U.S., the film debuted at number two on the Nielsen VideoScan First Alert chart, which tracks overall disc sales, as well as the dedicated Blu-ray Disc sales chart, with 63% of unit sales coming from Blu-ray.

The film was also collected in the 13-disc box set, titled "Marvel Cinematic Universe: Phase Two Collection", which includes all of the Phase Two films in the Marvel Cinematic Universe. It was released on December 8, 2015.

In April 2023, Disney+ added the ability to view the film with American Sign Language (ASL) featuring ASL performer Jac Cook. The service was created by Deluxe Media and Grupo Steno, with Delbert Whetter from RespectAbility serving as an ASL consultant along with Douglas Ridloff, who previously was the ASL consultant on the film Eternals (2021) and the Disney+ series Hawkeye (2021).

== Reception ==
=== Box office ===
Ant-Man grossed $180.2 million in North America and $339.1 million in other territories for a worldwide total of $519.3 million. Deadline Hollywood calculated the film's net profit as $103.9 million, accounting for production budgets, marketing, talent participations, and other costs; box office grosses and home media revenues placed it 14th on their list of 2015's "Most Valuable Blockbusters".

Ant-Man made $6.4 million from its Thursday night showings in North America, with 48% of tickets sales for IMAX and other large-format showings, and $23.4 million on its opening day, including Thursday's previews, making it the second-lowest opening day for a Marvel film, only ahead of 2008's The Incredible Hulk ($21.4 million). It fell 18% to earn $19.25 million on Saturday, and for its opening weekend total, earned $57.2 million. It marked the second-lowest debut for Marvel ahead of the $55.4 million debut of The Incredible Hulk in 2008. IMAX contributed $6.1 million to the opening gross, with premium large format screens comprising $6.4 million and Cinemark XD comprising $1.3 million, respectively. Ant-Man continued Marvel's streak of number one opening films, giving the studio its twelfth consecutive win. Disney reported that the film drew the largest share of families (28%) and women (32%) of any Marvel superhero title. It was also the biggest live-action opening ever for Rudd (breaking Knocked Up's record of $30.7 million) and a record opening for Douglas. It continued to be the top film at the box office in its second weekend.

Outside North America, it earned $55.4 million in its opening weekend from 37 countries, debuting in third place at the international box office behind the Chinese film Monster Hunt and Minions as well as an IMAX opening of $9.1 million. The top openings were the UK ($6 million), Mexico ($5.6 million), and Russia ($4.9 million). It had the biggest opening for a first-installment Marvel film in Hong Kong, Indonesia, Malaysia, the Philippines, Singapore, Taiwan, and Thailand. The film's opening in South Korea in early September 2015 earned $9.3 million, the highest opening for an international market at the time, before being surpassed by the Chinese opening in mid-October 2015, which earned $42.4 million, with $5.1 million coming from IMAX. The large opening weekend in China helped Ant-Man place first at the international box office for the first time, with the Chinese opening the second largest for an MCU film in the country behind Avengers: Age of Ultron. The film stayed at number one in China for a second week, earning an additional $22 million. As of November 1, 2015, the largest markets are China with $101.3 million, followed by the UK with $25.4 million, and South Korea with $18.9 million.

=== Critical response ===
The review aggregator Rotten Tomatoes reported an approval rating of 83%, with an average score of 6.9/10, based on 338 reviews. The website's consensus reads, "Led by a charming performance from Paul Rudd, Ant-Man offers Marvel thrills on an appropriately smaller scale – albeit not as smoothly as its most successful predecessors." On Metacritic, the film has an average score of 64 out of 100, based on 43 critics, indicating "generally favorable" reviews. CinemaScore reported that audiences gave the film an "A" grade on an A+ to F scale, while those at PostTrak gave it 4 out of 5 stars.

Justin Chang of Variety said the film "succeeds well enough as a genial diversion and sometimes a delightful one, predicated on the rarely heeded Hollywood wisdom that less really can be more." Todd McCarthy of The Hollywood Reporter remarked, "Although the story dynamics are fundamentally silly and the family stuff, with its parallel father-daughter melodrama, is elemental button-pushing, a good cast led by a winning Paul Rudd puts the nonsense over in reasonably disarming fashion." Kenneth Turan of the Los Angeles Times wrote, "Playful in unexpected ways and graced with a genuinely off-center sense of humor, Ant-Man (engagingly directed by Peyton Reed) is light on its feet the way the standard-issue Marvel behemoths never are." Kim Newman of Empire wrote that it "straddles as many genres as the Avengers films have characters but manages to do most of them pretty well. Extremely likable, with a few moments of proper wonder." A. O. Scott of The New York Times said, "This film is a passable piece of drone work from the ever-expanding Marvel-Disney colony."

For some critics, Ant-Man is seen as one of the more exceptional films in the Marvel franchise. Richard Brody of The New Yorker cited the film as "the non-bombastic superhero movie" that strays from the grandiose tone of other films in its genre, stating that the film is "a bracing, giddy delight.... [a neoclassical comedy] more closely related to Alfred Hitchcock's [To Catch a Thief] and to hectically skimpy B-movies than to the other members of the Marvel family." Matt Zoller Seitz of RogerEbert.com praised how the film "[f]eels handmade, not Marvel factory-approved. [It reminded me] of Zemeckis when Zemeckis was fun." In May 2016, ten months after Ant-Man was released, Seitz admitted that his "affection for it has increased with time" and compared its sweet and melodramatic sensibility to Spider-Man 2.

Conversely, Alonso Duralde of TheWrap said the film "serves up jokes that don't land and thrills that don't thrill." Richard Roeper of the Chicago Sun-Times said Ant-Man "is a lightweight, cliché-riddled origins story that veers between inside-joke comedy, ponderous redemption story lines and admittedly nifty CGI sequences that still seem relatively insignificant compared to the high stakes and city-shattering destruction that take place in most of the Avengers movies." Catherine Shoard of The Guardian wrote, "Ant-Man is a cut-and-shut muddle, haunted by [Edgar Wright's] ghost, produced by a high-end hot dog factory, by turns giddying and stupefying." Joe Morgenstern of The Wall Street Journal said that it is "a film that will surely be popular, given Marvel's marketing might, but one that's woefully short on coherence and originality." Christopher Orr of The Atlantic said, "It's difficult to shake the sense that the film was assembled hurriedly and somewhat haphazardly. Which, from all available evidence, is exactly what happened."

=== Accolades ===
Accolades received by Ant-Man (film)
| Award | Date of ceremony | Category | Recipient(s) | Result | Ref. |
|---|---|---|---|---|---|
| American Cinema Editors Awards | January 29, 2016 | Best Edited Feature Film – Comedy or Musical | Dan Lebental and Colby Parker, Jr. | Nominated | |
| British Academy Film Awards | February 14, 2016 | Best Special Visual Effects | Jake Morrison, Greg Steele, Dan Sudick, and Alex Wuttke | Nominated | |
| Critics' Choice Movie Awards | January 17, 2016 | Best Actor in an Action Movie | Paul Rudd | Nominated | |
| Dragon Awards | September 2–5, 2016 | Best Science Fiction or Fantasy Movie | Ant-Man | Nominated | |
| Empire Awards | March 20, 2016 | Best Comedy | Ant-Man | Nominated | |
| Empire Awards | March 20, 2016 | Best Visual Effects | Ant-Man | Nominated | |
| Georgia Film Critics Association Awards | January 8, 2016 | Oglethorpe Award for Excellence in Georgia Cinema | Ant-Man | Won | |
| Golden Reel Awards | February 27, 2016 | Outstanding Achievement in Sound Editing – Sound Effects and Foley for Feature Film | Shannon Mills and Daniel Laurie | Nominated | |
| Golden Trailer Awards | May 6, 2015 | Best Summer Blockbuster Trailer | "Chance" (Trailer Park, Inc.) | Nominated | |
| Golden Trailer Awards | May 4, 2016 | Best Fantasy Adventure | "Control" (MOCEAN) | Nominated | |
| Golden Trailer Awards | May 4, 2016 | Best Fantasy Adventure TV Spot | "Operation Online" (MOCEAN) | Nominated | |
| Hollywood Music in Media Awards | November 11, 2015 | Best Original Score in a Sci-Fi/Fantasy Film | Christophe Beck | Nominated | |
| MTV Movie Awards | April 10, 2016 | Best Hero | Paul Rudd | Nominated | |
| Nickelodeon Kids' Choice Awards | March 12, 2016 | Favorite Movie | Ant-Man | Nominated | |
| Saturn Awards | June 22, 2016 | Best Comic-to-Film Motion Picture | Ant-Man | Won | |
| Saturn Awards | June 22, 2016 | Best Actor | Paul Rudd | Nominated | |
| Saturn Awards | June 22, 2016 | Best Supporting Actor | Michael Douglas | Nominated | |
| Saturn Awards | June 22, 2016 | Best Supporting Actress | Evangeline Lilly | Nominated | |
| Saturn Awards | June 22, 2016 | Best Film Director | Peyton Reed | Nominated | |
| Saturn Awards | June 22, 2016 | Best Film Editing | Dan Lebental and Colby Parker, Jr. | Nominated | |
| Teen Choice Awards | August 16, 2015 | Choice Summer Movie Star: Male | Paul Rudd | Nominated | |
| Teen Choice Awards | August 16, 2015 | Choice Summer Movie Star: Female | Evangeline Lilly | Nominated | |
| Visual Effects Society Awards | February 2, 2016 | Outstanding Created Environment in a Photoreal Feature | Florian Witzel, Taylor Shaw, Alexis Hall, and Heath Kraynak for "The Microverse" | Nominated | |
| Visual Effects Society Awards | February 2, 2016 | Outstanding Virtual Cinematography in a Photoreal Project | James Baker, Alex Kahn, Thomas Luff, and Rebecca Baehler for "Macro Action" | Nominated | |

== Sequels ==
=== Ant-Man and the Wasp ===
A sequel, Ant-Man and the Wasp, was released on July 6, 2018, with Reed returning as director. Production writers Barrer and Ferrari wrote the screenplay with Rudd, Chris McKenna, and Erik Sommers. Rudd, Lilly, Cannavale, Peña, Harris, Greer, Dastmalchian, Fortson and Douglas all reprise their roles from Ant-Man, and are joined by Michelle Pfeiffer as Janet van Dyne, Laurence Fishburne as Bill Foster, Hannah John-Kamen as Ghost, Randall Park as Jimmy Woo, and Walton Goggins as Sonny Burch.

=== Ant-Man and the Wasp: Quantumania ===
A third Ant-Man film, titled Ant-Man and the Wasp: Quantumania, was released on February 17, 2023, with Reed returning to direct and Jeff Loveness writing the script. Rudd, Lilly, Douglas, and Pfeiffer reprise their roles, while Kathryn Newton takes over as Cassie Lang. Jonathan Majors joins as Kang the Conqueror.

== See also ==
- List of films featuring miniature people
