= Sage (Marvel Comics) =

Marvel Comics superhero

- Sage by Geoffrey Thorne & Marcus To

Publication information
- Publisher: Marvel Comics
- First appearance: The Uncanny X-Men #132 (April 1980) (as Tessa); X-Men #109 (February 2001) (as Sage)
- Created by: Chris Claremont (writer); John Byrne (artist)

In-story information
- Alter ego: Teresia Karisik
- Species: Human mutant
- Team affiliations: X-Force (Dawn of X); Multiverse X-Men; X-Treme X-Men; S.W.O.R.D. Exiles; New Excalibur; X-Men; X-Treme Sanctions Executive; Hellfire Club
- Notable aliases: Tessa, Lady Tessa, Diana Fox, Britannia
- Abilities: Ability to jumpstart mutant powers; Superhuman mental processing; Perfect memory; Data analysis; Movement replication; Telepathy; Skilled martial artist and markswoman

Sage (Teresia Karisik) is a character appearing in American comic books published by Marvel Comics. She has most often been associated with the X-Men and the Hellfire Club, whom she spied upon under the alias Tessa for Charles Xavier.

A mutant, Sage possesses a number of mental abilities and was presented as the personal assistant to Hellfire Club member Sebastian Shaw, but later was revealed that she was one of the first mutants recruited by Charles Xavier. She has been a member of the original X-Men teams, Excalibur, the Exiles, X-Force, and both versions of the X-Treme X-Men.

Sage appears in the television series The Gifted, portrayed by Hayley Lovitt.

== Publication history ==
Tessa first appeared in The Uncanny X-Men #132 (April 1980), and was created by Chris Claremont and John Byrne. Initially an agent of the Hellfire Club, decades later, she would join the X-Men and adopt the code-name "Sage" in X-Men #109 (February 2001). An extended retcon carried out by Claremont in X-Treme X-Men between 2002 and 2004 revealed she had always been working for Professor X, serving as a spy for him within the Hellfire Club.

The character is carried over to Uncanny X-Men during the Reload phase (2004), beginning with issue #444, but leaves the team in issue #455. She reappears in New Excalibur (2005-2007) #1-24, the mini-series X-Men: Die by the Sword (2007-2008) #1-5, Exiles (vol. 2) #100, New Exiles (2008-2009) #1-18, and a cameo in Exiles (vol. 3) #6.

She returns to the fray in X-Treme X-Men (vol. 2) (2012-2013) #6-13, and years later in Uncanny X-Men (vol. 5) (2018) #10, then as part of the Krakoan Age titles House of X (2019) and X-Force (vol. 6). As part of the 2024 relaunch, she is part of the cast of X-Force (vol. 7).

== Fictional character biography ==
=== Origins ===
Sage's exact country of origin remains unrevealed, but she claims to have come from a war-torn region. By the time she meets Charles Xavier, she is living by herself in Afghanistan, where she tries to keep out of the conflicts between the rebels and the government. One day, she follows a telepathic call to a cave where she finds Xavier with his legs crushed under debris, the result of his battle with the alien Lucifer. Xavier senses that Sage is a mutant, and explains the meaning of her abilities. Sage saves Xavier, also dispatching of a group of robbers, something she regrets years later.

=== Hellfire Club ===
Years later, Sage meets up again with Xavier, who at the time is recruiting the original X-Men. Instead of being chosen for the first X-Men class, she is sent to spy on the Hellfire Club as Tessa, and to keep watch on Sebastian Shaw.

=== After the Hellfire Club ===
After the X-Men's supposed death during the storyline "The Fall of the Mutants", Magneto ousts Sebastian Shaw from the Hellfire Club. Shortly thereafter, the Upstarts begin to hunt down mutant leaders, starting with former and current leaders of the Hellfire Club. Shinobi Shaw seemingly murders Sebastian Shaw and begins working with Tessa.

Selene and Madelyne Pryor join with Shaw to regain their roles in the Hellfire Club. Suspicious of Pryor, Tessa attempts to telepathically probe her while she is sleeping, unwittingly reawakening Pryor's memories of her life and first death with the X-Men.

=== Joining the X-Men ===
Elias Bogan kidnaps Sage and mentally dominates her, leaving her with permanent mental scars. Bogan ransoms Tessa to Sebastian Shaw, which the latter refuses. However, the X-Men become aware of Tessa's predicament, and Storm is able to rescue her. Out of gratitude, she stays with the X-Men, primarily in a support capacity, and resumes use of the name Sage. Fearful of mental domination, Sage relinquishes the use of her telepathic power and focuses on maintaining her mental shields.

=== X-Treme X-Men ===
After the X-Men learn of Destiny's prophetic diaries, Storm forms a splinter group to hunt down the missing volumes, with Sage as one of her first recruits. After the prophecies of the diaries are determined to be apparently invalid, the group remains separate from the main team of X-Men due to differences in philosophy with Xavier. Storm petitions various world governments for official recognition as a mutant unit for policing mutant activity. Granted this authority, her unit is dubbed the X-Treme Sanctions Executive (X.S.E), with Sage becoming an officer in the group. Sage's tenure with the team is abruptly ended when she rejoins the Hellfire Club to keep an eye on Sunspot, who has become Lord Imperial.

=== New Excalibur ===
Sage as Diana Fox, after beheading an alternate Cyclops. Art by Pat Olliffe.

For reasons yet unknown, Sage leaves Sunspot's side and travels to England to join forces with the newly reformed New Excalibur. To learn more about a mysterious new foe, Albion, Sage creates the new cover identity and persona of Diana Fox. This persona appears to be fully devoted to Albion and his goals. Fox climbs up the rank of Albion's Shadow Captains as Britannia, develops a rivalry with Lionheart, and is given a suit equipping her with flight and superhuman physical strength. A direct confrontation with her teammates in New Excalibur helps reassert Sage's original personality. Together with New Excalibur, Shadow-X, and Lionheart, Sage defeats Albion and his Shadow Captains.

=== X-Men: Die by the Sword and New Exiles ===
Immediately after the defeat of the Shadow Captains, a party is held in honor of Excalibur. While the team enjoys the party, Sage feels guilt for her actions. The party is suddenly crashed by Exiles members Psylocke and Thunderbird. They are then attacked by Rouge-Mort and drawn into a battle for the safety of the multiverse from a psychotic Merlin and Fury. They join forces with the rest of the Exiles, Roma and the Captain Britain Corps. The team defeats Merlin, but not before he manages to kill Roma.

Prior to her death, Roma transfers all of her knowledge about the multiverse into Sage's mind, causing her to become overwhelmed. Fearful of what would happen if someone on Earth ever gained the knowledge in her mind, Sage joins the Exiles.

While diverting her focus to analyze Cat's uncontrolled ability to "cascade" through different alternate versions of herself, and Cat's empathic connection to the Crystal Palace, the phantoms in Sage's mind escape. Sage decides to confront them and Diana. During her struggle, she bonds with Cat, who had been trying to find a way to heal the dying multiverse. In a later battle with Merlin, Merlin almost kills Sage, but Diana sacrifices herself to revive Sage. Sage reabsorbs Diana and kills Merlin. Sage merges with the Crystal Palace to stabilize the multiverse, a fate intended for Cat.

=== Return to X-Treme X-Men ===
Sage separates from the Crystal Palace and is seen helping Dazzler and an alternative reality Wolverine rescue a child version of Nightcrawler. At the conclusion of the "X-Termination" storyline, Sage returns to Earth-616.

=== Return to the X-Men and Krakoa ===
In 2019, Sage appeared in the dual mini-series House of X and Powers of X, which began the Krakoan Age. In the new status quo for the X-titles, Dawn of X, Sage is part of the cast of the X-Force relaunch (2019). Sage works with Cypher to establish the Krakoa transit system to allow mutants to arrive at the island.

=== X-Men: From the Ashes ===
After the Krakoan Age, Sage interns herself to a psychiatric clinic in the Swiss Alps, when she is found by Forge and recruited into his new X-Force.

== Powers and abilities ==
Sage is a mutant whose mind works in the same way as a supercomputer. Her mind has unlimited storage capacity, and she is able to immediately recall any information which she has stored with perfect clarity. The speed of her thoughts allows her to analyze her surroundings for information in an instant, and track the probability of an event by piecing together stored and acquired data. She is able to perform multiple functions at once by allocating a portion of her brain to each task: Sage can replay a film which she has seen in her mind, play a game of internet chess, and focus on battling an opponent simultaneously without any one task distracting her from another. Sage's control of her mind gives her total control of her own body. She is able to perfectly recreate physical actions that she has seen once so long as they are within her physical parameters, and she can control her bodily functions to a degree, like stopping her heart or breathing for as long as is safe.

Sage is also able to 'see' a person's genetic code, reading their DNA sequences for latent and manifested mutations. This allows her to identify mutants, and understand how their powers work. Sage is able to selectively evolve existing genetic traits, as well as catalyze the untapped genetic potential of latent mutants.

Sage possesses a degree of telepathic ability, allowing her to communicate with others over short distances, project psionic energy blasts, create illusions, and release an astral form within a limited range. By shutting down her telepathy, she is able to create a psychic firewall that blocks all manner of mental intrusion. The firewall can be used to deflect a psychic attack to its source.

Sage is skilled in martial arts, and is formidable hand-to-hand combatant thanks to her having complete conscious control over her own body. Her analytical skills and facility with probability also extend to combat situations, allowing her to predict an opponent's attacks and initiate the optimal counter-attack. Sage is also self-taught in a wide range of firearms, which she can use with considerable skill and accuracy. Her computer-like mind makes it easy for her to learn new skills and languages.

=== Equipment ===
- Sage uses a pair of cybernetic sunglasses that allow her to access and interface with computers and data networks.
- She frequently carries and uses firearms and edged weapons, and is highly skilled in their use. Her firearms are sometimes loaded with stun ammunition.

== Reception ==
- In 2014, Entertainment Weekly ranked Sage 60th in their "Let's rank every X-Man ever" list.
- CBR ranked Sage 14th in "25 Best Female X-Men Characters, Ranked".

== In other media ==
- Sage appears in the novelization for X-Men: The Last Stand as a student of Xavier's School for Gifted Youngsters.
- Sage appears in The Gifted, portrayed by Hayley Lovitt. This version was homeless before joining the Mutant Underground. After losing faith in them, Sage defects to the Hellfire Club to combat the Hound program, but she is killed by Reeva Payge.
