= Hayley Lovitt =

American actress and production coordinator (born 1986)

- Born: December 26, 1986 (age 39); Oklahoma
- Education: University of North Carolina
- Occupations: Actress, production coordinator
- Years active: 2009–present

Hayley Lovitt (born December 26, 1986) is an American actress and production coordinator. She is known for her portrayal as younger Janet van Dyne / The Wasp in Ant-Man (2015) and its sequel Ant-Man and the Wasp (2018) and for her portrayal as Sage on The Gifted.

== Life and career ==
Lovitt was born in Oklahoma and moved to North Carolina when she was in middle school. Her love for acting came about throughout her youth. She attended and graduated at University of North Carolina at Wilmington. She initially majored in Communication Studies and Psychology and considered becoming an attorney. She began to work professionally in 2009 in front of the camera and behind the scenes on film crew. Lovitt gained fame for her brief portrayal of Janet van Dyne / The Wasp in the film Ant-Man. She has continued to make appearances in comic-book-based properties such as The Gifted as the character Sage.

She also worked as a Production Assistant, Costumer and Production Coordinator for many years before turning to act full-time.

Lovitt is an animal lover and helps out at animal shelters.

== Filmography ==
=== Film ===
| Year | Title | Role | Notes |
|---|---|---|---|
| 2009 | Cabin Fever 2: Spring Fever | Sandy's Entourage | Uncredited |
| 2010 | The Paranormal Disappearance of Ailyn Jesick | Ailyn Jesick | |
| 2013 | Alone yet Not Alone | Regina Leininger / Tskinnak | |
| 2014 | The Remaining | Southern Belle | |
| 2015 | A Walk in the Woods | Donna | |
| 2015 | The Longest Ride | Rodeo Girl / Dancer | |
| 2015 | Ant-Man | Janet van Dyne / Wasp | Cameo |
| 2016 | Horn | Woman | Short |
| 2016 | Snapshot | Wendy Jackson | Short |
| 2018 | Hunter Killer | —N/a | Costumer |
| 2018 | Ant-Man and the Wasp | Young Janet van Dyne | |
| 2019 | 1st Summoning | Leslie | |

=== Television ===
| Year | Title | Role | Notes |
|---|---|---|---|
| 2010 | Gimme Shelter | Beautiful Girl | Pilot |
| 2010 | Master of the Mix | —N/a | Production assistant |
| 2011 | The Nate Berkus Show | —N/a | Production assistant |
| 2011–2012 | Homeland | —N/a | Production assistant |
| 2012 | One Tree Hill | Intern #3 | Episode: "Love the Way You Lie" |
| 2012 | United Stats of America | —N/a | Production assistant |
| 2012 | The Daily Show | —N/a | Production assistant |
| 2012-2013 | The Bachelorette: Ashley and JP's Wedding | —N/a | Production assistant |
| 2014 | Red Zone | Marcy | Pilot |
| 2014 | Banshee | ICU Nurse | Episode: "Homecoming"; Also production assistant |
| 2015 | Powers | Michelle Claremont | 3 episodes; Also costumer |
| 2015 | Turn: Washington's Spies | Celeste / Mistress | Episode: "False Flag" |
| 2015 | The Originals | Frightened Hand Maiden | Episode: "I'll See You in Hell or New Orleans" |
| 2015 | Into the Badlands | —N/a | Costumer |
| 2015 | Being Mary Jane | —N/a | Production assistant |
| 2016 | The Detour | —N/a | Production assistant |
| 2016 | Marvel's Most Wanted | —N/a | TV Pilot; Costumer |
| 2017 | Sleepy Hollow | Bryce | Episode: "The Way of the Gun" |
| 2017–2019 | The Gifted | Teresia Karisik/Sage | |
| 2019 | New Amsterdam | Tori | Episode: "Happy Place" |
